= Presidencies of Alfonso López Pumarejo =

Colombian presidential administrations from 1934 to 1938 and 1942 to 1946

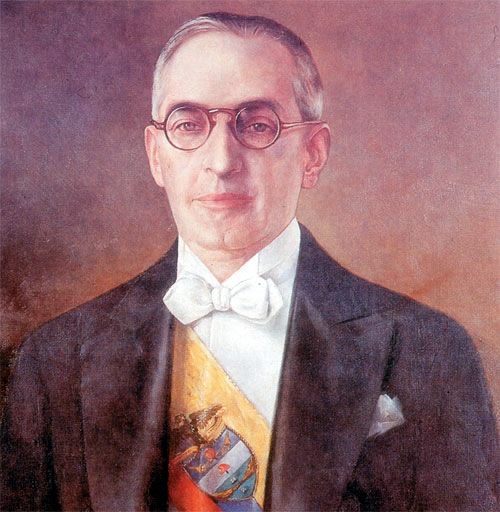
- Presidencies of Alfonso López Pumarejo
- Party: Liberal
- Seat: San Carlos Palace
- First term 7 August 1934 – 7 August 1938
- Cabinet: See list
- Election: 1934
- Second term 7 August 1942 – 7 August 1946
- Cabinet: See list
- Election: 1942
- Seal of the President (1900–1950)

Alfonso López Pumarejo was President of Colombia first from 7 August 1934, to 7 August 1938, and then from 7 August 1942, to 7 August 1946. His presidencies were the nation's 16th and 14th, both called the Liberal Republic López Pumarejo defeated Eutiquio Timoté of Tolima in 1934, and then defeated Carlos Arango Vega of Bogotá in 1942.

== 1934 Election ==
López Pumarejo was elected as the candidate of the Liberal party, to be later elected on 10 February 1934 as the 14th president of the Republic of Colombia, defeating his only opponent Eutiquio Timoté, candidate of the Colombian Communist party, with a large majority. that due to the lack of guarantees from the Government, the Conservative party refused to nominate any candidate for the 1934 Presidential elections.

== First presidency (1934–1938) ==
=== Administration ===
The First López Pumarejo Cabinet
Office	Name	Term
President	Alfonso López Pumarejo	1934–1936
Interior	Luis Cano	1934–1934
- Darío Echandía: 1934–1935
- Alberto Lleras Camargo: 1935–1937
- Darío Echandía: 1937–1937
Foreign Affairs	Roberto Urdaneta	1934–1935
- Enrique Olaya Herrera: 1935–1935
- Francisco Samper: 1935–1935
- Ernesto González: 1935–1936
- Jorge Soto: 1936–1937
