= Alfonso Araújo Gaviria =

Colombian lawyer, diplomat and Liberal party politician

- Ambassador Alfonso Araújo (left) as he presented his credentials to Secretary-General Dag Hammarskjöld during a ceremony at UN Headquarters.

8th Permanent Representative of Colombia to the United Nations
- In office 4 September 1957 – 4 February 1961
- President: Gabriel París Gordillo
- Preceded by: Francisco José Urrutia Holguín
- Succeeded by: Germán Zea Hernández

3rd Colombia Ambassador to Brazil
- In office 1944–1946
- President: Alberto Lleras Camargo
- Preceded by: Carlos Lozano y Lozano

21st Minister of Finance and Public Credit of Colombia
- In office 7 August 1942 – 23 August 1943
- President: Alfonso López Pumarejo
- Preceded by: Carlos Lleras Restrepo
- Succeeded by: Arcesio Londoño Palacio

Minister of Government of Colombia
- In office 1 February 1940 – 17 May 1940
- President: Eduardo Santos Montejo
- Preceded by: Carlos Lozano y Lozano
- Succeeded by: Jorge Gartner de la Cuesta

15th Minister of National Education of Colombia
- In office 7 August 1938 – 1 February 1940
- President: Eduardo Santos Montejo
- Preceded by: José Joaquín Castro Martínez
- Succeeded by: Jorge Eliécer Gaitán Ayala

Envoy Extraordinary and Minister Plenipotentiary of Colombia to Venezuela
- In office 1937–1938
- President: Alfonso López Pumarejo

38th Minister of Public Works of Colombia
- In office 28 July 1931 – 7 August 1934
- President: Enrique Olaya Herrera
- Preceded by: Germán Uribe Hoyos
- Succeeded by: César García Alvarez

Personal details
- Born: 28 July 1902 Bogotá, D.C., Colombia
- Died: 4 February 1961 (aged 58) New York City, New York, United States
- Party: Liberal
- Spouse: Emma Ortiz Márquez
- Children: Emma Araújo Ortiz; Helena Araújo Ortiz; María Mercedes Araújo Ortiz; Roberto Araújo Ortiz
- Education: Externado University (JD, 1923)
- Profession: Lawyer

Alfonso Araújo Gaviria (28 July 1902 — 4 February 1961) was a Colombian lawyer, diplomat, and Liberal party politician, who served as the 8th Permanent Representative of Colombia to the United Nations, the 3rd Ambassador of Colombia to Brazil, the 21st Minister of Finance and Public Credit, the 15th Minister of National Education, and the 38th Minister of Public Works of Colombia, as well as Minister of Government, and Envoy of Colombia to Venezuela.

== Personal life ==
Alfonso was born on 28 July 1902 in Bogotá, D.C., Colombia to Simón Araújo Vélez and Ifigénia Gaviria Cobaleda. He graduated Juris Doctor from the Externado University in 1923. He married Emma Ortiz Márquez and had four children: Emma, Helena, María Mercedes, and Roberto.
