= List of mayors of Bogotá =

This is a list of mayors of Bogotá from 1538 to 1570 and since 1910.

== Encomenderos & ordinary Mayor - Spanish Administration of Santa Fe de Bogotá (1538–1810) ==
1	1538–1539	Gonzalo Jiménez de Quesada	
2	1539–1539	Jerónimo de Lainza	
3	1539–1540	Juan de Arévalo	
4	1540–1541	Capitán Antonio Díaz Cardozo	
5	1541–1541	Juan Tafur	
6	1541–1542	Juan Díaz Hidalgo	
7	1542–1542	Hernán Venegas Carrillo	
8	1542–1543	Juan de Céspedes	
9	1543–1544	Hernán Venegas	
10	1544–1544	Juan Ruiz de Orejuela	
11	1544–1545	Gonzalo García Zorro	
12	1545–1545	Juan Ruiz de Orejuela	
13	1545–1546	Gonzalo García Zorro	
14	1546–1546	Juan de Céspedes	
15	1546–1547	Juan Tafur	
16	1547–1547	Pedro de Colmenares	
17	1547–1548	Juan Muñoz de Collantes	
18	1548–1548	Gonzalo García Zorro	
19	1548–1549	Juan Ruiz de Orejuela	
20	1549–1550	Juan Ruiz de Orejuela	
21	1550–1550	Juan de Avellaneda	
22	1550–1550	Gonzalo García Zorro	
23	1550–1551	Juan de Avellaneda	
24	1551–1551	Juan Ruiz de Orejuela	
25	1551–1552	Juan Muñoz de Collantes	
26	1552–1552	Juan Tafur	
27	1552–1553	Gonzalo Rodríguez de Ledesma	
28	1553–1553	Juan de Rivera	
29	1553–1554	Gonzalo García Zorro	
30	1554–1554	Juan Tafur	
31	1554–1555	Juan Ruiz de Orejuela	
32	1555–1555	Andrés López de Galarza	
33	1555–1556	Antonio Ruiz	
34	1556–1556	Gonzalo García Zorro	
35	1556–1557	Domingo Lozano	
36	1557–1557	Juan de Ortega	
37	1557–1558	Diego Rodríguez de Baldeno	
38	1558–1558	Antón de Olaya	
39	1558–1559	Gonzalo Rodríguez de Ledesma	
40	1559–1559	Juan Tafur	
41	1559–1560	Antonio Bermúdez	
42	1560–1560	Juan Ruiz de Orejuela	
43	1560–1561	Andrés de Molina	
44	1561–1561	Francisco de Figueredo	
45	1561–1561	Hernán Gómez de Castillejo	
46	1562–1562	Juan de Rivera	
47	1562–1563	Antonio Díaz Cardoso	
48	1563–1563	Alonso de Olaya	
49	1563–1564	Juan Ruiz de Orejuela	
50	1564–1564	Gonzalo García Zorro	
51	1564–1565	Andrés de Molina	
52	1565–1565	Juan Ruiz de Orejuela	
53	1565–1566	Gonzalo Rodríguez de Ledesma	
54	1566–1566	Juan de Penagos	
55	1566–1567	Gonzalo de León	
56	1567–1567	Antón de Olaya	
57	1567–1568	Antonio Díaz Cardoso	
58	1568–1568	Gonzalo de Ledesma	
59	1568–1569	Juan de Montalvo	
60	1569–1569	Cristóbal Gómez	
61	1569–1569	Cristóbal Ortiz Bernal	
62	1569–1570	Andrés Molina	
63	1570–1570	Lorenzo Bernaldes	
64	1570–1571	Juan de Ortega	
65	1571–1571	Juan Tafur	
66	1571–1572	Alonso de Olaya	
67	1572–1572	Antonio Díaz Cardoso	
68	1572–1573	Gonzalo Rodríguez de Ledesma	
69	1573–1573	Antonio de Olaya	
70	1573–1574	Juan de Ortega	
71	1574–1574	Juan Montalvo	
72	1574–1575	Alonso de Olmos	
73	1575–1575	Francisco de Santiago	
74	1575–1576	Francisco de Tordehumos	
75	1576–1576	Juan de Ortega	
76	1576–1577	Hernando de Velasco Angulo	
77	1577–1577	Juan de Otálora	
78	1577–1578	Lope de Céspedes	
79	1578–1578	Gonzalo Rodríguez de Ledesma	
80	1578–1579	Hernando de Velasco Angulo	
81	1579–1579	Alfonso de Olaya	
82	1579–1580	Luis de Colmenares	
83	1580–1580	Diego Chamoso	
84	1580–1581	Diego de Ortega	
85	1581–1581	Hernando de Velasco Angulo	
86	1581–1582	Rodrigo Pardo	
87	1582–1582	Juan de Montalvo	
88	1582–1583	Luis de Colmenares	
89	1583–1583	Juan de Olmos	
90	1583–1584	Juan de Guzmán	
91	1584–1584	Diego de Hidalgo	
92	1584–1585	Luis Cardoso Ome	
93	1585–1585	Luis de Colmenares	
94	1585–1586	Hernando Arias Forero	
95	1586–1586	Juan de Olmos	
96	1586–1587	Juan de Villanueva	
97	1587–1587	Hernando de Alcozer	
98	1587–1587	Francisco Gómez	
99	1588–1588	Diego de Hidalgo	
100	1588–1589	Esteban de Orejuela	
101	1589–1589	Luis de Colmenares	
102	1589–1590	Francisco de Berrio	
103	1590–1590	Gaspar López Salgado	
104	1590–1591	Juan de Olmos	
105	1591–1591	Diego de Hidalgo	
106	1591–1592	Antonio de Céspedes	
107	1592–1592	Luis de Colmenares	
108	1592–1593	Nicolás Gutiérrez	
109	1593–1593	Gaspar López Salgado	
110	1593–1594	Juan de Artieda	
111	1594–1594	Luis de Pernía	
112	1594–1595	Alonso Gutiérrez Pimentel	
113	1595–1595	Juan de Guzmán	
114	1595–1596	Diego Malado de Bohórquez	
115	1596–1596	Gaspar López Salgado	
116	1596–1597	Antonio de Céspedes	
117	1597–1597	Luis de Colmenares	
118	1597–1598	Nicolás de Sepúlveda	
119	1598–1598	Francisco Gómez de la Cruz	
120	1598–1599	Luis Bernal	
121	1599–1599	Francisco Rodríguez Galeano	
122	1599–1600	Gómez Suárez de F.	
123	1600–1600	Gaspar López Salgado	
124	1600–1601	Gonzalo de León Venero	
125	1601–1601	Juan Bautista Bermeo	
126	1601–1602	Martín de Barganzo	
127	1602–1602	Francisco de Berrio	
128	1602–1602	Gaspar López Salgado	
129	1602–1603	Francisco de Urretarrisque	
130	1603–1603	Fernando de Caycedo	
131	1603–1604	Luis Bernal	
132	1604–1604	Gonzalo de León V.	
133	1604–1605	Juan de Valladolid	
134	1605–1605	Lope de Céspedes	
135	1605–1606	Diego Arias	
136	1606–1606	Martín de Vergazo	
137	1606–1607	Pedro Flórez	
138	1607–1607	Juan de Valladolid	
139	1607–1608	Francisco Venegas	
140	1608–1608	Francisco de Berrio	
141	1608–1609	Gaspar López de Salgado	
142	1609–1609	Francisco Gómez de la Cruz	
143	1609–1610	Gonzalo de León Venero	
144	1610–1610	Juan del Río	
145	1610–1611	Sebastián de Alcinia	
146	1611–1611	Gómez Suárez de Figueroa	
147	1611–1612	Pedro Marino de Rivera	
148	1612–1612	Pedro Ruiz de Otálora y Másmela	
149	1612–1613	Luis de Salas Cubides	
150	1613–1613	Luis de Colmenares	
151	1613–1614	Alonso López Hidalgo	
152	1614–1614	Luis de Henríquez	
153	1614–1615	Iñigo de Alviz	
154	1615–1615	Francisco Félix Beltrán de Caycedo	
155	1615–1616	Juan Clemente Chávez	
156	1616–1616	Pedro de Otálora	
157	1616–1617	Juan Martínez de salabarrieta	
158	1617–1617	Francisco Gómez de la Cruz	
159	1617–1618	Francisco de Novoa	
160	1618–1618	Antonio Olaya Herrera	
161	1618–1619	Lucas de Santiago	
162	1619–1619	Alonso de Mayorga	
163	1619–1620	Miguel Arias de Ugarte	
164	1620–1620	Cristóbal Clavijo	
165	1620–1621	Juan de Lasarte	
166	1621–1621	Gonzalo de León	
167	1621–1622	Martín de Verganzo y Gamboa	
168	1622–1622	Francisco Rodríguez Galeano	
169	1622–1623	Francisco de Novoa	
170	1623–1623	Iñigo de Alviz	
171	1623–1624	Pablo de Mondragón	
172	1624–1624	Juan Clemente de Chaves	
173	1624–1625	Francisco de Colmenares	
174	1625–1625	Juan Suárez de Orejuela	
175	1625–1626	Pedro Bravo	
176	1626–1626	Luis de Colmenares	
177	1626–1627	Juan de Esparza	
178	1627–1627	Diego de Bravo	
179	1627–1628	José de Piza	
180	1628–1628	José de Rojas	
181	1628–1629	Lucas de Santiago	
182	1629–1629	Cristóbal Gómez de Silva	
183	1629–1630	Simón de Sosa	
184	1630–1630	Pedro de Otálora	
185	1630–1631	Francisco Beltrán de C.	
186	1631–1631	Cristóbal Clavijo	
187	1631–1632	Bernabé León Beltrán	
188	1632–1632	Martín de Berganza	
189	1632–1633	Simón de Sosa	
190	1633–1633	Juan Francisco Rodríguez Galeano	
191	1633–1634	Francisco de Nova	
192	1634–1634	Andrés Pérez de Pisa	
193	1634–1635	Fernando Lozano Infante Paniagua	
194	1635–1635	Juan Francisco Rodríguez Galeano	
195	1635–1636	Lorenzo Martínez de Oviedo	
196	1636–1636	Antonio de Olaya	
197	1636–1637	Dolacinto Florián	
198	1637–1637	Luis de Berrio	
199	1637–1638	Juan de Orgaz	
200	1638–1638	Francisco de Ospina M.	
201	1638–1638	Juan de mayorga	
202	1638–1639	Antonio de Vergara Azcárate y Dávila	
203	1639–1639	Simón de Sosa	
204	1639–1640	Francisco de Sologuren	
205	1640–1640	Francisco Sarmiento	
206	1640–1641	Juan de Esparza	
207	1641–1641	Juan de Papiain	
208	1641–1642	Simón de Sosa	
209	1642–1642	Francisco Beltrán de Caycedo	
210	1642–1643	Cristóbal Bernal	
211	1643–1643	José de Pisa	
212	1643–1644	Lucas Gutiérrez de Céspedes	
213	1644–1644	Andrés de Herrera y Calderón	
214	1644–1645	Pedro López Nieto	
215	1645–1645	Pedro de Salazar Falcón	
216	1645–1646	Joaquín de Urquijo	
217	1646–1646	Luis de Berrio	
218	1646–1647	Francisco Félix Beltrán de Caycedo	
219	1647–1647	Fernando Berrio	
220	1647–1648	Miguel de Loyola	
221	1648–1648	Juan de Capiain	
222	1648–1649	Juan Venegas	
223	1649–1649	Juan de Esparza	
224	1649–1650	José de Mesa Cortés	
225	1650–1651	Francisco de Colmenares	Martín de Urquijo y Mendoza
226	1651–1651	Francisco Rodríguez Galeano	
227	1651–1652	Juan de Solavarrieta	
228	1652–1652	Fernando Clavijo	
229	1652–1653	Antonio de Vega	
230	1653–1653	Diego de Osorio	
231	1653–1654	Juan Bravo	
232	1654–1654	Cristóbal Ortiz Bernal	
233	1654–1655	Diego de Osorio	
234	1655–1655	Cristóbal Ortiz Bernal	
235	1655–1656	Rodrigo de Aldana	
236	1656–1656	Juan de Solavarrieta	
237	1656–1657	Diego de la Rosa	
238	1657–1657	Luis de Berrio	
239	1657–1658	Pablo Jerez de Rojas	
240	1658–1658	Juan de Esparza	
241	1658–1659	Pedro Félix de Quesada	
242	1659–1659	Pedro Félix de Quesada	
243	1659–1659	Juan de Recalde	
244	1659–1660	Francisco de Colmenares	
245	1660–1660	Francisco de Laverde	
246	1660–1661	Miguel de Loyola	
247	1661–1661	Francisco Rodríguez Galeano	
248	1661–1662	José de Solavarrieta	
249	1662–1662	Juan de Solavarrieta	
250	1662–1663	Francisco de Venegas	
251	1663–1663	Juan de Solavarrieta	
252	1663–1664	Francisco de Venegas	
253	1664–1664	Juan de Esparza	
254	1664–1665	Nicolás de Osorio	
255	1665–1665	Diego de Ospina Malado	
256	1665–1666	Fernando de Olmos y Salcedo	
257	1666–1666	Juan Flórez de Ocariz	
258	1666–1667	Diego Malado	
259	1667–1667	Diego Fajardo	
260	1667–1668	Juan Cano Barba Mozo	
261	1668–1668	Fernando Clavijo	
262	1668–1669	Francisco Galeano	
263	1669–1669	Antonio de Salazar Falcon	
264	1669–1670	Francisco Santos Negrón	
265	1670–1670	Miguel Enríquez de Mancilla	
266	1670–1671	Jorge Valera	
267	1671–1671	Luis de Berrio	
268	1671–1672	Alonso Dávila Y Mendoza	
269	1671–1672	Juan Osorio Nieto de Paz	
270	1672–1673	Fernando Martínez de Fresneda	
271	1673–1673	Juan Gutiérrez de Céspedes	
272	1673–1674	Fernando de Olmos	
273	1674–1674	Juan Bernabea y Mancilla	
274	1674–1675	Antonio de Vergara Azcárate y Dávila	
275	1675–1675	Miguel de Mena y Loyola	
276	1675–1676	José de Ricaurte	
277	1676–1676	Nicolás Osorio Nieto de Paz	
278	1676–1677	Juan Gómez de Villalobos	
279	1677–1677	Francisco Félix Beltrán de Caycedo	
280	1677–1678	Agustín de Terreros y Villarreal	
281	1678–1678	Tomás Pardo Dasmariñas y Fonseca	
282	1678–1679	Juan Francisco de Sarasua	
283	1679–1679	Fernando Leonel de Caycedo	
284	1679–1680	Miguel de Acuña y Angulo	
285	1680–1680	Juan Ramírez de Poveda y Venero	
286	1680–1681	Andrés de Contreras	
287	1681–1681	Juan de Angulo y Olarte	
288	1681–1682	Hermenegildo de Rojas y Bolívar	
289	1682–1682	José Martín Flórez de Acuña	
290	1682–1683	Antonio la Lana y Geuza	
291	1683–1684	Capitán Antonio de Salazar Falcón	
292	1684–1684	Capitán Antonio de Salazar Falcón	
293	1684–1685	Francisco Venegas	
294	1685–1685	Capitán Francisco Masco Venegas	
295	1685–1686	Alonso de Caycedo Malado y O.	
296	1686–1686	Rodrigo de Guzmán Ponce de León	
297	1686–1686	Francisco Antonio Dávila Malado	
298	1687–1687	Francisco Álvarez de Velasco y Zorrilla	
299	1687–1688	Tomás Flórez de Acuña	
300	1688–1688	Diego de Solavarrieta Bravo	
301	1688–1688	Andrés Marín y Morales	
302	1688–1689	José de Mesa Cortés	
303	1689–1689	Maestre de Campo E	
304	1689–1690	Juan Bautista Echavarría	
305	1690–1690	Pedro de Herrera Brochero	
306	1690–1691	Pedro de Subia	
307	1691–1691	Francisco Salinas y Berrio	
308	1691–1692	Juan de Osorio Nieto de Paz	
309	1692–1692	Cristóbal Vélez Ladrón de Guevara	
310	1692–1693	Andrés de Soto López	
311	1693–1693	Jerónimo de Berrío	
312	1693–1693	Francisco de Mercado y Verdugo	
313	1693–1694	Pedro de Olarte	
314	1694–1694	Manuel Malado de Bohórquez	
315	1694–1695	Agustín de Londoño y Trasmiera	
316	1695–1695	Alonso de Caycedo Malado	
317	1695–1696	Juan de Mora Barcenos	
318	1696–1696	José de Ricaurte	
319	1696–1697	Pedro López de Güero Marroquín	
320	1697–1697	Cristóbal de Pedrozo y Dosma	
321	1697–1698	Francisco Cortés Basconcellos	
322	1698–1698	Antonio Ximénez de la Parra	
323	1698–1699	Pedro de Herrera Brochero	
324	1699–1699	Jerónimo de Berrío y Mendoza	
325	1699–1700	Agustín de Londoño y Trasmiera	
326	1700–1700	Diego A. de Valenzuela	
327	1700–1701	José López Bravo de Torres	
328	1701–1701	José López Bravo de Torres	
329	1701–1702	Juan Galindo y Mendoza	
330	1702–1702	José Antonio Zuleta Reales y Cara	
331	1702–1703	Francisco José de Caycedo Malado	
332	1703–1703	José de Aroca	
333	1703–1703	Luis Francisco de la Granja	
334	1703–1704	José López Bravo	
335	1704–1704	Juan Osorio Nieto de Paz	
336	1704–1704	Pedro Laiceca y Alvarado	
337	1704–1705	José Ignacio de Velasco	
338	1705–1705	Pedro Munar	
339	1705–1705	Domingo de Barasorda	
340	1706–1706	José Ramírez de Sigüenza	
341	1706–1707	José Ignacio de Velasco	
342	1707–1707	Bautista de Echavarría	
343	1707–1708	Fernando de Acuña y Berrio	
344	1708–1708	Alonso de Caycedo Malado	
345	1709–1709	Agustín de Londoño y Trasmiera	Miguel Francisco Berrío Mendoza
346	1710–1710	Juan Antonio Ramírez Serna	
347	1710–1711	PedroTamayo Arnau	
348	1711–1711	Marco Antonio de Rivera y Guzmán	
349	1711–1712	Antonio Gil de Cabrera y Quirós	
350	1712–1712	Francisco Cortés Basconcellos	
351	1712–1713	Fernando de Quesada de Isla	
352	1713–1713	Francisco José Flórez y Venegas	
353	1713–1713	Bernardo de Velasco	
354	1714–1714	Gregorio Miguel de Valenzuela	
355	1714–1715	Nicolás de Santamaría y Angulo	
356	1715–1715	Antonio Gil de Cabrera y Quirós	
357	1715–1716	Fernando de Olmos y Sapiain	
358	1716–1716	Juan de Cárdenas Barajas	
359	1716–1717	Manuel Sáenz del Pon	
360	1717–1717	Alonso de Caycedo Malado	
361	1717–1718	Cristóbal Bernardino de Lechuza	
362	1718–1718	Nicolás León y Achuri	
363	1718–1719	Gregorio Miguel de Valenzuela	
364	1719–1719	Pedro de Subia	
365	1719–1720	José Salvador de Ricaurte	
366	1720–1720	José Salvador de Ricaurte	
367	1720–1721	José Vicente de Londoño Salgado	
368	1721–1721	José Salvador de Ricaurte	
369	1721–1722	Juan Romana y Valdés	
370	1722–1722	José de Mora y Melgar	
371	1722–1723	José Antonio Pedrozo y Heredia	
372	1723–1723	Pedro de Tobar y Buendía	
373	1723–1724	José de Talens	
374	1724–1724	Pedro de Tobar y Buendía	
375	1724–1725	José de Talens	
376	1725–1725	Nicolás Antonio Dávila Malado	
377	1725–1726	Cristóbal Bernardino de Lechuga	
378	1726–1726	Fernando de Quesada	
379	1726–1727	José Vicente de Londoño y Salgado	
380	1727–1727	José Mendibur	
381	1727–1728	Cristóbal Bernardino de Lechuga	Miguel Francisco Berrío Mendoza
382	1729–1729	Miguel Francisco Berrío Mendoza	
383	1729–1730	Cristóbal Bernardino de Lechuga	
384	1730–1730	Francisco Flórez y Vanegas	
385	1730–1731	Juan Francisco de Insinillas	
386	1731–1731	Lorenzo de Alea y Estrada	
387	1731–1732	Nicolás Cobo Calleja	
388	1732–1732	Nicolás Antonio Dávila	
389	1732–1733	Antonio de Bustamante	
390	1733–1733	Ignacio de Caycedo y Pastrana	
391	1733–1734	Tomás de Laiceca	
392	1734–1734	José Rafael de Laiseca Fajardo	
393	1734–1734	Julián de Buendía	
394	1735–1735	Diego Agustín de Caycedo	
395	1735–1736	Tomás Beltrán de Larreategui	
396	1736–1736	Lorenzo Fernández Seijas	Juan Manuel de Moya y Guzmán
397	1736–1737	Tomás Antonio de Laiceca	
398	1737–1737	Pedro de Laiceca y Alvarado	
399	1737–1738	Ignacio de Caycedo y Pastrana	
400	1738–1738	Juan Bautista de Erazo y Mendigaña	
401	1739–1739	Antonio Flórez y Venegas	
402	1739–1739	Francisco Javier de Chaverri y Cobo	
403	1740–1740	Francisco de la Serna Ibáñez	
404	1740–1741	Francisco Tordecillas	
405	1741–1741	Nicolás José Cobo Calleja	
406	1741–1742	Francisco Javier García de Andrade	
407	1742–1742	Francisco de Vergara Azcárate	
408	1742–1742	Manuel de Ahumada y González	
409	1743–1743	Ignacio Francisco de Valenzuela Fajardo Olmos	
410	1743–1744	Pedro Galavis Martín	
411	1744–1744	Tomás Prieto de Salazar Ricaurte	
412	1744–1744	Miguel Antonio Fernández de Seijas	
413	1745–1745	José Vélez Ladrón de Guevara	
414	1745–1745	José Torrijos	
415	1746–1746	Felipe de la Romana Herrera	Nicolás de León Herrera
416	1747–1747	Diego de Tobar y Buendía	
417	1747–1747	Juan José Gil Martínez Malo	
418	1748–1748	Juan Agustín de Ricaurte Terreros	Antonio Álvarez
419	1749–1749	Ignacio Sanz de Santamaría Gómez de Salazar	
420	1749–1750	José Paniagua	
421	1750–1750	Francisco De la Serna Ibáñez	
422	1750–1751	Juan Antonio Rodríguez Malado	
423	1751–1751	José Mendibur	
424	1751–1751	Alonso Venegas	
425	1751–1751	José Salvador Herrera	
426	1751–1752	Luis Tobar y Buendía Ricaurte	
427	1752–1752	Juan de Mora	
428	1752–1753	Miguel Galvis	
429	1753–1753	Francisco Javier Sanz de Santamaría Gómez de Salazar	
430	1753–1754	José Miguel de Cabrera y Subia	
431	1754–1754	José Rafael de Laiseca Fajardo	
432	1754–1755	Francisco Lechuga Tobar	
433	1755–1755	Cayetano de Ricaurte y Terreros	
434	1755–1756	Felipe Galvis	
435	1756–1756	Tomás de Laiseca y Fajardo	
436	1756–1757	Agustín Rojas Rebollar	
437	1757–1757	Miguel de Galvis	
438	1757–1757	Miguel López de Castillo	
439	1757–1758	Carlos Lees Portocarrero Nerval	
440	1758–1758	Manuel de Guzmán y M.	
441	1758–1759	José Ignacio Ortega Gómez de Salazar	
442	1759–1759	José Groot de Vargas	Andrés Ortiz De la Serna
423	1760–1760	Luis del Castillo Guevara y Toledo	
444	1760–1761	Gregorio Londoño	
445	1761–1761	José Groot de Vargas	
446	1761–1762	Francisco Antonio Moreno y Escandón	
447	1762–1762	Francisco Sanz de Santamaría Gómez de Salazar	
448	1762–1762	José Ignacio Ortega Gómez de Salazar	
449	1763–1763	Francisco Antonio Vélez L.	
450	1763–1764	Luis Claudio de Azuola Prieto	
451	1764–1764	Cayetano Ricaurte y Terreros	
452	1764–1765	Agustín Vélez L	
453	1765–1765	Francisco Domínguez de Tejada Hereros	
454	1765–1766	Jorge Miguel Lozano de Peralta	
455	1766–1766	Rafael José de Ricaurte y Terreros	
456	1766–1767	José Antonio Ibáñez	
457	1767–1767	Diego Lasquetti Rey	
458	1767–1768	Juan Jiménez Pérez	
459	1768–1768	Miguel Rivas Gómez de Lasprilla	
460	1768–1769	Pedro de Ugarte	
461	1769–1769	José Joaquín Flórez y Subia	
462	1769–1770	Fernando Rodríguez Sotomayor	
463	1770–1770	Pedro de Ugarte	
464	1770–1771	José Groot de Vargas	
465	1771–1771	Benito de Agar y Leis	
466	1771–1772	Gregorio Sánchez Manzaneque	
467	1772–1772	Manuel Díaz de Hoyos	
468	1772–1773	Eustaquio Galvis	
469	1773–1773	Miguel Rivas Gómez de Lasprilla	
470	1773–1774	Francisco Domínguez Urrego	
471	1773–1774	Lucas de Erazo y Mendigaña	
472	1773–1775	Domingo Antonio de Guzmán	
473	1775–1775	Francisco Ortiz Manosalvas	
474	1775–1775	José Antonio Ricaurte Rigueiros	
475	1775–1776	Francisco De la Serna Ibáñez	
476	1776–1776	Francisco Antonio Vélez	
477	1777–1777	Domingo de Caicedo	
478	1777–1778	José María Prieto Dávila	
479	1778–1778	Nicolás Bernal Rigueiro	
480	1778–1779	José Joaquín Chacón Mujica	
481	1779–1779	José Joaquín Flórez y Subia	
482	1779–1780	Francisco de Camacho y Solórzano	
483	1780–1780	Manuel Campuzano	
484	1780–1781	Cristóbal Casalo	
485	1781–1781	Eustaquio Galavís Hurtado	
486	1781–1781	Manuel de Zornosa	
487	1782–1783	Pedro Groot Alea	
488	1783–1783	Francisco Torrijos y Rigueiro	
489	1783–1783	Manuel Benito de Castro	
490	1783–1784	Pedro de Ugarte	
491	1784–1784	Manuel Campuzano	
492	1784–1785	José Malo	
493	1785–1785	Pedro Ricaurte	
494	1785–1786	Miguel Galindo	
495	1786–1786	Juan Antonio de Olea	
496	1786–1787	Pedro Valentín García de Tejada	
497	1787–1787	Matías José de Leiva	
498	1787–1788	Juan de Olea	
499	1788–1788	Gregorio Domínguez	
500	1788–1789	Clemente Camacho	
501	1789–1789	José María Lozano	
502	1789–1790	Antonio Nariño	
503	1790–1790	Francisco Silvestre	José Miguel Pey
504	1791–1791	Rafael de Araos	
505	1791–1791	Ignacio Calderón	
506	1791–1791	Antonio Vásquez	
507	1791–1792	Antonio de las Cajigas	
508	1792–1792	Tomás Tenorio y Carvajal	
509	1792–1793	Andrés de Otero	
510	1793–1793	Carlos de Burgos	
511	1793–1794	José de Ayala y Vergara	
512	1794–1794	Eustaquio Galavís Hurtado	
513	1794–1795	Pedro Rodríguez	
514	1795–1795	Miguel de Galindo	
515	1795–1796	José Miguel de Rivas	
516	1796–1797	Pantaleón Gutiérrez	José Miguel Pey
517	1797–1797	José María Domínguez del Castillo	
518	1797–1798	Silvestre Trillo	
519	1798–1798	Lorenzo Marroquín de la Sierra	
520	1798–1798	Vicente Rojo	
521	1798–1799	Nicolás Bernal	
522	1799–1799	Jorge Tadeo Lozano y Manrique	
523	1799–1800	Fernando Zuleta	
524	1800–1800	Fernando Rodríguez	Nicolás de Ugarte y Hierro
525	1800–1801	Juan José Tobar y Buendía	
526	1801–1801	Carlos de Burgos	
527	1801–1801	Vicente Rojo	
528	1801–1801	Francisco Domínguez y Castillo	
529	1801–1802	Lucas de Erazo y Mendigaña	
530	1802–1802	Juan José Sanz de Santamaría	
531	1802–1802	Lucas de Erazo y Mendigaña	
532	1802–1803	José Miguel de Rivas	
533	1803–1803	José Ignacio Sanmiguel Tordecillas	
534	1803–1804	Juan Gómez	
535	1804–1804	José Joaquín Álvarez	
536	1804–1805	Lucas de Erazo y Mendigaña	
537	1805–1805	Pedro de Ricaurte y Torrijos	
538	1805–1806	Antonio Larrabí	
539	1806–1806	Juan Nepomuceno Quijano	
540	1806–1806	Jerónimo de Auza	
541	1806–1807	Juan M Rodríguez L.	
542	1807–1807	José Tomás Muelle Lago	
543	1807–1808	José Gabriel Manzano	
544	1808–1808	José Tadeo Cabrera	
545	1808–1809	José Nicolás de Rivas	
546	1809–1809	Luis Caycedo y Flórez	
547	1809–1810	José Antonio de Ugarte	
548	1810–1810	José Miguel Pey y Andrade	

== Mayors of Santa Fe de Bogotá ==
- Eustaquio Galavís y Hurtado, 1770s & 1794 -

== Municipal Mayors of Bogotá (1910–1954) ==
- Javier Tobar Ahumada, 1910–1911
- Manuel María Mallarino, 1911–1913
- Emilio Cuervo Márquez, 1913–1914
- Andrés Marroquín Osorio, 1914–1917
- Raimundo Rivas, 1917
- Gerardo Arrubla, 1917–1918
- Santiago de Castro, 1918–1920
- Tadeo de Castro, 1920
- Cenón Escobar, 1920
- Ernesto Sánz de Santamaría, 1920–1925
- Leonidas Ojeda, 1925
- José Posada Tavera, 1925–1926
- José María Piedrahita, 1926–1929
- Luis Borrero Mercado, 1929
- Luis Augusto Cuervo, 1929
- Alfonso Robledo, 1929
- Hernando Carrizosa, 1929–1930
- Luis Carlos Páez, 1930
- Enrique Vargas Nariño, 1930–1931
- Francisco Umaña Bernal, 1931
- Enrique Vargas Nariño, 1931
- Luis Patiño Galvis, November 1931 – December 1933
- Alfonso Esguerra, December 1933 – March 1934
- Julio Pardo Dávila, March 1934 – January 1935
- Diego Montaña Cuéllar, January 1935 – February 1935
- Jorge Merchán, February 1935 – October 1935
- Carlos Arango Vélez, October 1935 – March 1936
- Francisco José Arévalo, March 1936 – June 1936
- Jorge Eliécer Gaitán, June 1936 – March 1937
- Gonzalo Restrepo, March 1937 – May 1937
- Manuel Rueda Vargas, May 1937 – March 1938
- Gustavo Santos, March 1938 – October 1938
- Germán Zea Hernández, October 1938 – April 1941
- Julio Pardo Dávila, May 1941 – August 1942
- Carlos Sánz de Santamaría, August 1942 – March 1944
- Jorge Soto del Corral, March 1944 – November 1944
- Gabriel Paredes, November 1944 – January 1945
- Juan Pablo Llinás, January 1945 – June 1945
- Ramón Muñoz Toledo, June 1945 – September 1946
- Juan Salgar Martín, October 1946 – March 1947
- Francisco José Arévalo, April 1947 – March 1948
- Manuel de Vengoechea Mier, March 1948 – April 1948
- Fernando Mazuera Villegas, April 1948 – October 1948
- Carlos Reyes Posada, October 1948 – December 1948
- Fernando Mazuera Villegas, December 1948 – May 1949
- Carlos Reyes Posada, May 1949 – June 1949
- Gregorio Obregón, June 1949 – September 1949
- Marco Tulio Amaya, September 1949 – October 1949
- Santiago Trujillo, October 1949 – July 1952
- Manuel Briceño, July 1952 – June 1953
- José Rodríguez Mantilla, June 1953 – July 1953
- Col. Julio Cervantes, July 1953 – September 1954

== Mayors of the Special District of Bogotá (1954–1991) ==
Mayor	Term
Roberto Salazar Gómez	1954–1955
Andrés Rodríguez Gómez	1955–1957
Fernando Mazuera Villegas	1957–1958
Juan Pablo Llinás	1958–1961
Jorge Gaitán Cortés	1961–1966
Virgilio Barco Vargas	1966–1969
Emilio Urrea Delgado	1969–1970
Carlos Albán Holguín	1970–1973
Aníbal Fernández de Soto	1973–1974
Alfonso Palacio Rudas	1974–1975
Luis Prieto Ocampo	1975–1976
Bernardo Gaitán Mahecha	1976–1978
Hernando Durán Dussán	1978–1982
Augusto Ramírez Ocampo	1982–1984
Hisnardo Ardila	1984–1985
Diego Pardo Koppel	1985–1986
Julio César Sánchez	1986–1988
Andrés Pastrana Arango	1988–1990
Juan Martín Caicedo Ferrer	1990–1991

== Principal mayors of the Capital District of Santa Fe de Bogotá (1991–1998) ==
Mayor	Term
Juan Martín Caicedo Ferrer	1991–1992
Sonia Durán de Infante (ad hoc)	1992
Jaime Castro Castro	1992–1994
Antanas Mockus Sivickas	1995–1996
Paul Bromberg Silverstein	1997–1998

== Principal mayors of the Capital District of Bogotá (1988–present) ==
Elected by popular vote since 1988, for a two-year term, without immediate reelection. Change in 2004 for a 3- to 4-year term, without immediate reelection.

Mayor	Start	End	Political Party
Andrés Pastrana Arango	1 June 1988	31 May 1990	Colombian Conservative Party
Juan Martín Caicedo	1 June 1990	30 March 1992	Colombian Liberal Party
Sonia Durán Smela	31 March 1992	31 May 1992	Colombian Liberal Party
Jaime Castro Castro	1 June 1992	31 December 1994	Colombian Liberal Party
Antanas Mockus	1 January 1995	10 April 1997	Independent
Paul Bromberg Zylverstein	11 April 1997	31 December 1997	Green Alliance
Enrique Peñalosa	1 January 1998	31 December 2000	Colombian Liberal Party
Antanas Mockus	1 January 2001	31 December 2003	Indigenous Social Alliance Movement
Luis Eduardo Garzón	1 January 2004	31 December 2007	Alternative Democratic Pole
Samuel Moreno Rojas	1 January 2008	3 May 2011	Alternative Democratic Pole
María Fernanda Campo	4 May 2011	8 June 2011	Social Party of National Unity
Clara López Obregón	8 June 2011	31 December 2011	Alternative Democratic Pole
Gustavo Petro	1 January 2012	19 March 2014	Progressive Movement
Rafael Pardo Rueda	19 March 2014	21 April 2014	Colombian Liberal Party Social Party of National Unity
María Mercedes Maldonado	21 April 2014	22 April 2014	Progressive Movement
Gustavo Petro	23 April 2014	31 December 2015	Progressive Movement
Enrique Peñalosa	1 January 2016	31 December 2019	Radical Change
Claudia López	1 January 2020	31 December 2023	Green Alliance Alternative Democratic Pole
Carlos Fernando Galán	1 January 2024	Incumbent	New Liberalism

== See also ==
- Superior Mayor of Bogotá
- History of Bogotá
- Timeline of Bogotá
