= Carlos Sanz de Santamaría =

- Official UN portrait of Carlos Sanz de Santamaría

18th Permanent Representative of Colombia to the United Nations
- In office 3 March 1982 – 2 May 1983
- President: Belisario Betancur Cuartas
- Preceded by: Indalecio Liévano Aguirre
- Succeeded by: Carlos Albán Holguín

Minister of Finance and Public Credit
- In office 5 September 1962 – 21 February 1964
- President: Guillermo León Valencia
- Preceded by: Virgilio Barco Vargas
- Succeeded by: Diego Calle Restrepo

Colombia Ambassador to the United States
- In office 1 April 1960 – 5 September 1962
- President: Alberto Lleras Camargo
- Preceded by: José Gutiérrez Gómez
- Succeeded by: Eduardo Uribe Botero

Minister of Foreign Affairs
- In office 11 May 1957 – 7 August 1958
- President: Gabriel París Gordillo
- Preceded by: José Manuel Rivas Sacconi
- Succeeded by: Julio César Turbay Ayala

Minister of War
- In office 11 December 1946 – 23 April 1947
- President: Mariano Ospina Pérez
- Preceded by: Luis Tamayo
- Succeeded by: Fabio Lozano y Lozano

6th Colombia Ambassador to the United States
- In office 12 September 1945 – 11 December 1946
- President: Alberto Lleras Camargo
- Preceded by: Gabriel Turbay Abunader
- Succeeded by: Gonzalo Restrepo Jaramillo

26th Minister of Finance and Public Credit of Colombia
- In office 9 April 1945 – 13 August 1945
- President: Alfonso López Pumarejo
- Preceded by: Roberto Urdaneta Arbeláez
- Succeeded by: Francisco de Paula Pérez

Minister of National Economy
- In office 6 March 1944 – 9 April 1945
- President: Darío Echandía Olaya
- Preceded by: Moisés Prieto
- Succeeded by: Luis Tamayo

Mayor of Bogotá
- In office August 1942 – 6 March 1944
- President: Alfonso López Pumarejo
- Preceded by: Julio Pardo Dávila
- Succeeded by: Jorge Soto del Corral

Personal details
- Born: 23 April 1905 Bogotá, D.C., Colombia
- Died: 5 November 1992 (aged 87) Bogotá, D.C., Colombia
- Party: Liberal
- Spouse: Dolores "Lola" Londoño
- Children: Alberto Sanz Londoño; Guillermo Sanz Londoño; Inés Elvira Sanz Londoño
- Education: National University of Colombia; École Nationale des Ponts et Chaussées
- Profession: Hydraulic Engineer

Carlos Sanz de Santamaría (23 April 1905 – 5 November 1992) was the 18th Permanent Representative of Colombia to the United Nations, and twice served as Ambassador of Colombia to the United States; he also served as the Chairman of the Inter-American Committee on the Alliance for Progress, the precursor of the Organization of American States. A Colombian civil engineer by training, he gained national acclaim for his work in the constructions of the aqueducts of Santa Marta, Riohacha, and Buenaventura, and the Vitelma Water Treatment Plant in Bogotá, and was hoisted to the national stage for his endeavours first as Mayor of Bogotá and then went on to occupy different executive ministries including the Ministry of Foreign Affairs and the Ministry of War, and serving as the 9th Minister of National Economy and the 26th and 41st Minister of Finance and Public Credit of Colombia.

== Background ==
He graduated from the National University of Colombia in 1928 with a bachelor in civil engineering, and moved to France to study at the École Nationale des Ponts et Chaussées, where he received his master's in hydraulic engineering in 1929. He was an associate member of the Societé des Ingenieurs Civiles de France (Engineer Society of France) since 1930, and a member of the Sociedad Colombiana de Ingenieros (Colombian Engineer Society) since 1932, of which it served twice as President.

== Selected works ==
- Sanz de Santamaría, Carlos (1978). Fin del asilo del Doctor Víctor Raúl Haya de la Torre, 1954 [The End of the Asylum of Doctor Víctor Raúl Haya de la Torre, 1954] (in Spanish). Bogotá: Fundación Centenario del Banco de Colombia. OCLC 5814196.
- Sanz de Santamaría, Carlos (1965). Una época difícil [a Difficult Time]. Colección Aventura del desarrollo (in Spanish). Bogotá: Ediciones Tercer Mundo. OCLC 1343227.
