= Joaquín Vallejo Arbeláez =

Colombian civil engineer

- Official UN Portrait of Joaquín Vallejo Arbeláez.

Minister of Government of Colombia
- In office 7 August 1970 – 17 November 1970
- President: Misael Pastrana Borrero
- Preceded by: Douglas Botero Boshell
- Succeeded by: Abelardo Forero Benavides

12th Permanent Representative of Colombia to the United Nations
- In office 1 October 1969 – 14 September 1970
- President: Carlos Lleras Restrepo
- Preceded by: Julio César Turbay Ayala
- Succeeded by: Augusto Espinosa Valderrama

44th Minister of Finance and Public Credit of Colombia
- In office 14 July 1965 – 7 August 1966
- President: Guillermo León Valencia
- Preceded by: Hernando Durán Dussán
- Succeeded by: Abdón Espinosa Valderrama

7th Minister of Foment of Colombia
- In office 11 May 1957 – 10 December 1957
- President: Gabriel París Gordillo
- Preceded by: Mariano Ospina Navia
- Succeeded by: Harold Henry Eder Caicedo

Personal details
- Born: 2 October 1912 Rionegro, Antioquia, Colombia
- Died: 31 December 2005 (aged 93) Medellín, Antioquia, Colombia
- Party: Liberal
- Spouse: Nelly Mejía Arbeláez (-1980)
- Education: National University of Colombia at Medellín
- Profession: Civil Engineer

Joaquín Vallejo Arbeláez (2 October 1912 — 31 December 2005) was a Colombian civil engineer, businessman and writer who served as 12th Permanent Representative of Colombia to the United Nations, and held various ministries during the Military Junta and the National Front in Colombia. As Colombian Minister of Foment in 1957 during the administration of General Gabriel París Gordillo, he helped design and implement the mechanism that would eventually become known as the Vallejo Plan, a business plan that would allow Colombian companies to import raw materials, specialized equipment, and industrial machinery with duty-free exemptions or lowered tariffs, if those materials and/or equipment would go towards producing marketable exporting goods, as an incentive to industrialize the national economy and open up to international markets.

== Personal life ==
Joaquín Vallejo Arbeláez was born in Rionegro, Antioquia on 4 October 1912 to Antonio José Nestor Vallejo Mejía and Zoraida Dolores Arbeláez Echeverri. He married his first cousin Nelly Mejía Arbeláez, with whom he had ten children, nine of them surviving into adulthood: María Eugenia, Luz Marina, María Cristina, María Inés, Nestor Francisco, Jesús Alberto, Rosario del Pilar, José Joaquín, and Pablo.

Vallejo was the legal godfather of Pablo Escobar. In 1989, Vallejo claimed to have attempted to work with Germán Montoya, the Secretary General to Colombian President Virgilio Barco, to negotiate a deal with the cocaine cartels. The Barco administration denied negotiating "with the drug mafia", and at the time the allegations of such negotiations were publicized, had recently claimed that organized criminals would attempt to slander the government so as to weaken its political support.

== Selected works ==
- Vallejo Arbeláez, Joaquín (1976). El Mistério del Tiempo [The Mystery of Time] (in Spanish). Candelaria, Valle del Cauca: Italgraf. OCLC 155470210.
- Vallejo Arbeláez, Joaquín (1971). A.B.C. de la Integración Latinoamericana [The ABC of Latin American Integration]. El Dedo en la herida, 38 (in Spanish). Bogotá: Tercer Mundo. OCLC 253171025.
- Vallejo Arbeláez, Joaquín (1980). La Libertad y las Ciencias [Freedom and the Sciences]. Las Fronteras de las Libertades [The Limits of Freedoms] (in Spanish). Vol. I. Palmira, Valle del Cauca: Printer Colombiana. OCLC 7946366.
- Vallejo Arbeláez, Joaquín (1980). La Libertad en la Filosofia [Freedom in Philosophy]. Las Fronteras de las Libertades [The Limits of Freedoms] (in Spanish). Vol. II. Palmira, Valle del Cauca: Printer Colombiana. OCLC 7946366.
- Vallejo Arbeláez, Joaquín (1980). La Libertad Humana Ante la Etica y el Derecho [Human Freedom Before Ethic and Law]. Las Fronteras de las Libertades [The Limits of Freedoms] (in Spanish). Vol. III. Palmira, Valle del Cauca: Printer Colombiana. OCLC 7946366.
- Vallejo Arbeláez, Joaquín (1980). La Practica de la Libertad [The Practice of Freedom]. Las Fronteras de las Libertades [The Limits of Freedoms] (in Spanish). Vol. IV. Palmira, Valle del Cauca: Printer Colombiana. OCLC 7946366.
