= Germán Zea Hernández =

Colombian lawyer and politician

- Official UN Portrait of Germán Zea Hernández.

Minister of Government
- In office 7 August 1978 – 15 May 1981
- President: Julio César Turbay Ayala
- Preceded by: Alfredo Araújo Grau
- Succeeded by: Jorge Mario Eastman Robledo

15th Permanent Representative of Colombia to the United Nations
- In office 1975–1977
- President: Alfonso López Michelsen
- Preceded by: Aurelio Caicedo Ayerbe
- Succeeded by: José Fernando Botero

Minister of Foreign Affairs
- In office 7 August 1966 – 9 August 1968
- President: Carlos Lleras Restrepo
- Preceded by: Cástor Jaramillo Arrubla
- Succeeded by: Alfonso López Michelsen

9th Permanent Representative of Colombia to the United Nations
- In office 1961–1965
- President: Guillermo León Valencia Muñóz
- Preceded by: Alfonso Araújo Gaviria
- Succeeded by: Alfonso Patiño Rosselli

Minister of Justice and Law
- In office 7 August 1958 – 5 May 1960
- President: Alberto Lleras Camargo
- Preceded by: Rodrigo Noguera Laborde
- Succeeded by: Alfredo Araújo Grau

Governor of Cundinamarca
- In office 8 November 1943 – 23 March 1944
- President: Darío Echandía Olaya
- Preceded by: Agustín Aljure
- Succeeded by: Parmenio Cárdenas

Comptroller General
- In office May 1941 – October 1941
- President: Eduardo Santos Montejo
- Preceded by: Alfonso Romero Aguirre
- Succeeded by: Leopoldo Lascarro Batista

Mayor of Bogotá
- In office October 1938 – April 1941
- President: Eduardo Santos Montejo
- Preceded by: Gustavo Santos
- Succeeded by: Julio Pardo Dávila

Personal details
- Born: Germán Zea Hernández; 15 April 1905 Bogotá, D.C., Colombia
- Died: 8 February 1989 (aged 83) Bogotá, D.C., Colombia
- Party: Liberal
- Spouse: Beatriz Gutiérrez Muñoz
- Relations: Fernando Botero Zea (grandson)
- Children: Gloria Zea Soto; Luis Germán Zea Gutiérrez; Juan Manuel Zea Gutiérrez
- Education: Free University of Colombia (LLD)
- Profession: Lawyer

Germán Zea Hernández (Note: In this Spanish name, the first or paternal surname is Zea and the second or maternal family name is Hernández.) (15 April 1905 — 8 February 1989) was a Colombian lawyer and politician. A Liberal Party politician, he served twice as Permanent Representative of Colombia to the United Nations, and occupied the Ministries of Government, Justice, and Foreign Affairs. He also served as 11th Comptroller General of Colombia, Mayor of Bogotá, and Governor of Cundinamarca, as well as Senator and Representative in Congress.

== Personal life ==
Germán was born on 15 April 1905 in Bogotá to Luis Zea Uribe and Clorinda Hernández Ospina. He married Beatriz Gutiérrez Muñoz, with whom he had two sons, Luis Germán and Juan Manuel, but he also had a daughter out of wedlock with Carlota Soto named Gloria Zea whom married painter Fernando Botero and had a second marriage with Colombian dynasty billionaire Andrés Uribe Campuzano and creator of the Modern Art Museum of Bogota and one of the main figures of culture and arts in Colombia.

Germán raised Gloria in his household with his wife Beatriz.
