= Augusto Ramírez Ocampo =

Colombian politician

Mayor of Bogotá
- In office 1982–1984
- Preceded by: Hernando Durán Dussán
- Succeeded by: Hisnardo Ardila

Colombian Minister of Foreign Affairs
- In office 29 June 1984 – 7 August 1986
- President: Belisario Betancur
- Preceded by: Rodrigo Hernán Lloreda Caicedo
- Succeeded by: Julio Londoño Paredes

Personal details
- Born: 21 September 1934 Bogotá, Colombia
- Died: 14 June 2011 (aged 76) Bogotá, Colombia
- Party: Conservative

Augusto Ramírez Ocampo (21 September 1934 – 14 June 2011) was a Colombian politician who served as Mayor of Bogotá from 1982 to 1984, and Colombia's foreign minister from 1984 to 1986. Ocampo died in Bogotá on 14 June 2011, aged 76.
