= Miguel Urrutia =

Miguel Urrutia may refer to:

- Miguel Urrutia Barboza (1861–1933), Chilean politician, minister of war
- Miguel Urrutia Montoya (1939–2024), Colombian economist and author
  - Miguel Urrutia Art Museum in Bogotá, named for him
- Miguel Urrutia, represented Mexico in Basque pelota at the 2019 Pan American Games
