= Carlos Albán Holguín =

Colombian politician

- Official UN Photo portrait of Carlos Albán Holguín

19th Permanent Representative of Colombia to the United Nations
- In office 2 May 1983 – 17 September 1987
- President: Belisario Betancur Cuartas (1983–1986); Virgilio Barco Vargas (1986–1987)
- Preceded by: Carlos Sanz de Santamaría
- Succeeded by: Enrique Peñalosa Camargo

Colombian Minister of National Education
- In office 12 March 1981 – 7 August 1982
- President: Julio César Turbay Ayala
- Deputy: José Luis Acero Jordán
- Preceded by: Guillermo Angulo Gómez

Mayor of Bogotá
- In office 1970–1973
- President: Misael Pastrana Borrero
- Preceded by: Emilio Urrea Delgado
- Succeeded by: Aníbal Fernández de Soto

Personal details
- Born: Carlos Albán Holguín; 21 October 1930 Cali, Cauca Valley, Colombia
- Died: 11 March 1995 (aged 64) Bogotá D.C, Colombia
- Party: Conservative
- Spouse: Gloria Duran
- Profession: Lawyer

Carlos Albán Holguín (21 October 1930 – 11 March 1995) was a Colombian lawyer and politician who served as the 19th Permanent Representative of Colombia to the United Nations. He also served as Minister of National Education during the administration of Julio César Turbay Ayala, and was appointed Mayor of Bogotá by President Misael Pastrana Borrero.
