= Fernando Londoño y Londoño =

Colombian lawyer and diplomat

Colombia Ambassador to Brazil
- In office 1969–1970
- President: Carlos Lleras Restrepo
- Preceded by: Luis Humberto Salamanca Medina

Colombian Minister of Government
- In office 1 September 1961 – 7 August 1962
- President: Alberto Lleras Camargo
- Preceded by: Augusto Ramírez Moreno
- Succeeded by: Eduardo Uribe Botero

30th Governor of Caldas
- In office 24 June 1953 – 23 September 1953
- President: Gustavo Rojas Pinilla
- Preceded by: José Restrepo Restrepo
- Succeeded by: Gustavo Sierra Ochoa

Mayor of Manizales
- In office 1950–1952

3rd Permanent Representative of Colombia to the United Nations
- In office 1949–1950
- President: Mariano Ospina Pérez
- Preceded by: Roberto Urdaneta Arbeláez
- Succeeded by: Elíseo Arango Ramos

Minister of War of Colombia
- In office 21 March 1948 – 10 April 1948
- President: Mariano Ospina Pérez
- Preceded by: Fabio Lozano y Lozano
- Succeeded by: Germán Ocampo Herrera

1st Colombia Ambassador to France
- In office 30 May 1947 – 21 March 1948
- President: Mariano Ospina Pérez
- Preceded by: *Office Created

Colombian Minister of Foreign Affairs
- In office 9 September 1945 – 7 August 1946
- President: Alberto Lleras Camargo
- Preceded by: Alberto Lleras Camargo
- Succeeded by: Francisco Umaña Bernal

Personal details
- Born: 5 December 1910 Manizales, Caldas, Colombia
- Died: 3 November 1994 (aged 83) Bogotá, D.C., Colombia
- Party: Conservative
- Spouse: Melba Hoyos Botero
- Children: Fernando Londoño Hoyos; Guillermo Alberto Londoño Hoyos; Álvaro Londoño Hoyos; Melba Londoño Hoyos; Luz María Londoño Hoyos
- Education: University of Cauca
- Profession: Lawyer

Fernando Londoño y Londoño (5 December 1910 – 3 November 1994) was a Colombian lawyer and diplomat who served as the third Permanent Representative of Colombia to the United Nations, the first Ambassador of Colombia to France, Ambassador of Colombia to Brazil, and Minister of Foreign Affairs of Colombia. A Conservative Party politician, he served in the Executive as Mayor of Manizales, Governor of Caldas, and Colombian Minister of Government, and in the Legislative as Member of the City Council of Manizales, the Departmental Assembly of Caldas, and the Chamber of Representatives of Colombia.

== See also ==
- Fernando Londoño Hoyos
