= Alfonso Patiño Rosselli =

Colombian jurist and diplomat

Magistrate of the Supreme Court of Colombia

46th Minister of Finance and Public Credit of Colombia
- In office 7 August 1970 – 11 June 1971
- President: Misael Pastrana Borrero
- Preceded by: Abdón Espinosa Valderrama
- Succeeded by: Rodrigo Llorente Martínez

Colombia Ambassador to Uruguay
- In office 1969–1970
- President: Carlos Lleras Restrepo
- Preceded by: Humberto Silva Valdivieso

10th Permanent Representative of Colombia to the United Nations
- In office 1966–1967
- President: Guillermo León Valencia
- Preceded by: Germán Zea Hernández
- Succeeded by: Julio César Turbay Ayala

Governor of Boyacá
- In office 1951–1952
- Appointed by: Roberto Urdaneta Arbeláez
- Preceded by: Carlos Arturo Torres Poveda
- Succeeded by: Luis Sarmiento Buitrago

Personal details
- Born: 1923 Sogamoso, Boyacá, Colombia
- Died: 7 November 1985 Bogotá, Colombia
- Party: Conservative
- Spouse: María Cristina Zuleta
- Education: Externado University
- Profession: Lawyer

Alfonso Patiño Rosselli (1923 – 7 November 1985) was a Colombian jurist and diplomat who died in the 1985 Palace of Justice siege by the M-19, where he was a magistrate and President of the Constitutional Chamber of the Supreme Court of Colombia. He also served as the 10th Permanent Representative of Colombia to the United Nations, the 46th Minister of Finance and Public Credit of Colombia, Ambassador of Colombia to Uruguay, and Governor of Boyacá.
