= Augusto Espinosa Valderrama =

Colombian lawyer and politician

- Official UN photo of Augusto Espinosa Valderrama.

Colombia Ambassador to the United Kingdom
- In office 29 November 1982 – 16 January 1985
- President: Belisario Betancur Cuartas
- Preceded by: Diego Andrés Restrepo Londoño
- Succeeded by: Bernardo Ramírez Rodríguez

Senator of Colombia
- In office 20 July 1978 – 29 November 1982
- In office 20 July 1962 – 14 September 1970
- In office 20 July 1958 – 7 August 1958

Member of the Chamber of Representatives of Colombia
- In office 20 July 1974 – 20 July 1978
- Constituency: Santander Department

Permanent Representative of Colombia to the United Nations
- In office 14 September 1970 – 13 September 1973
- President: Misael Pastrana Borrero
- Preceded by: Joaquín Vallejo Arbeláez
- Succeeded by: Aurelio Caicedo Ayerbe

Ministry of Agriculture and Rural Development (Colombia)|Colombian Minister of Agriculture
- In office 7 August 1958 – 23 March 1959
- President: Alberto Lleras Camargo
- Preceded by: Jorge Mejía Salazar
- Succeeded by: Gilberto Arango Londoño

President of the Senate of Colombia
- In office 20 July 1963 – 20 July 1964

Personal details
- Born: 5 June 1919 Bucaramanga, Santander, Colombia
- Died: 1986 (aged 74)
- Party: Liberal
- Spouse: Myriam Silva
- Relations: Abdón Espinosa Valderrama (brother)
- Children: Augusto Espinosa Silva; Javier Espinosa Silva; Daniel F Espinosa Silva
- Education: National University of Colombia (LLD)
- Profession: Lawyer

Augusto Espinosa Valderrama (5 June 1919 – 1986) was a Colombian lawyer and politician who served as Liberal Party Representative, Senator and President of the Senate in the Congress of Colombia. He also served as the Permanent Representative of Colombia to the United Nations, and as the Ambassador of Colombia to the United Kingdom.

== Selected works ==
- Espinosa Valderrama, Augusto (1986). Jordan Flórez, Fernando (ed.). Escritos Políticos y Económicos: 1942–1958 [Political and Economic Writings: 1942–1958] (National government publication) (in Spanish). Bogotá: Office of the Comptroller General of Colombia. OCLC 16658092.
- Espinosa Valderrama, Augusto (1986). Reflexiones Para El Cambio [Reflections For Change] (Book) (in Spanish). Bogotá: Editora Guadalupe. ISBN 978-958-608-034-7. OCLC 15092272.
- Espinosa Valderrama, Augusto (1985). Economía y Paz [Economy and Peace] (Speech) (in Spanish). Bogotá: Editora Guadalupe. ISBN 978-958-608-021-7. OCLC 181643971.
- Espinosa Valderrama, Augusto (1967). Filosofía y Programas del Liberalismo Colombiana [Philosophy and Programs of Colombian Liberalism] (Conference) (in Spanish). Bogotá. OCLC 43316339.
- Espinosa Valderrama, Augusto (1942). El Pensamiento Económico y Político en Colombia: Apuntes Sobre Su Evolución [The Economic and Political Mindset in Colombia: Notes On Their Evolution] (Thesis) (in Spanish). Bucaramanga: Imprenta del Departamento de Santander. OCLC 12096405.
