= Francisco José Urrutia Holguín =

Colombian-Ecuadorian lawyer and diplomat (1910–1981)

- UN Secretary-General Dag Hammarskjöld (left), with Ambassador Francisco Urrutia in 1953.

11th Colombia Ambassador to the United States
- In office 14 November 1955 – 10 October 1957
- President: Gustavo Rojas Pinilla
- Preceded by: Eduardo Zuleta Ángel
- Succeeded by: José Gutiérrez Gómez

7th Permanent Representative of Colombia to the United Nations
- In office 19 August 1953 – 4 September 1957
- President: Gustavo Rojas Pinilla
- Preceded by: Evaristo Sourdis Juliao
- Succeeded by: Alfoso Araújo

Colombia Ambassador to Venezuela
- In office 1952–1953
- President: Roberto Urdaneta Arbeláez

Colombia Ambassador to Argentina
- In office 1948–1950
- President: Mariano Ospina Pérez

Personal details
- Born: 28 May 1910 Quito, Pichincha, Ecuador
- Died: 19 October 1981 (aged 71) Bogotá, D.C., Colombia
- Spouse: Genoveva Montoya Williamson (1934-)
- Children: Francisco Antonio Urrutia Montoya; María Lourdes Urrutia Montoya; Jorge Urrutia Montoya; Miguel Urrutia Montoya; Jaime Urrutia Montoya
- Education: National University of Colombia (PhD)
- Profession: Lawyer

Francisco José Urrutia Holguín (28 May 1910 – 19 October 1981) was a Colombian-Ecuadorian lawyer and diplomat. He served as the seventh Permanent Representative of Colombia to the United Nations, the 11th Colombia Ambassador to United States, and the Ambassador to Venezuela and Argentina.

== Personal life ==
Francisco José Urrutia Holguín was born on 28 May 1910 in Quito, Ecuador to Francisco José Urrutia Olano, a Colombian diplomat who served as Minister of Foreign Affairs, and Minister Plenipotentiary of Colombia in Ecuador, and Elena Holguín Arboleda, Colombian activist who served as President of the Anti-Tuberculosis League of Colombia, and President of the Colombian Red Cross. He married Genoveva Montoya Williamson on 18 July 1934 in Bogotá, and together had five children: Francisco, María Lourdes, Jorge, Miguel, and Jaime.
