= Helena Araújo =

Colombian writer (1934-2015)

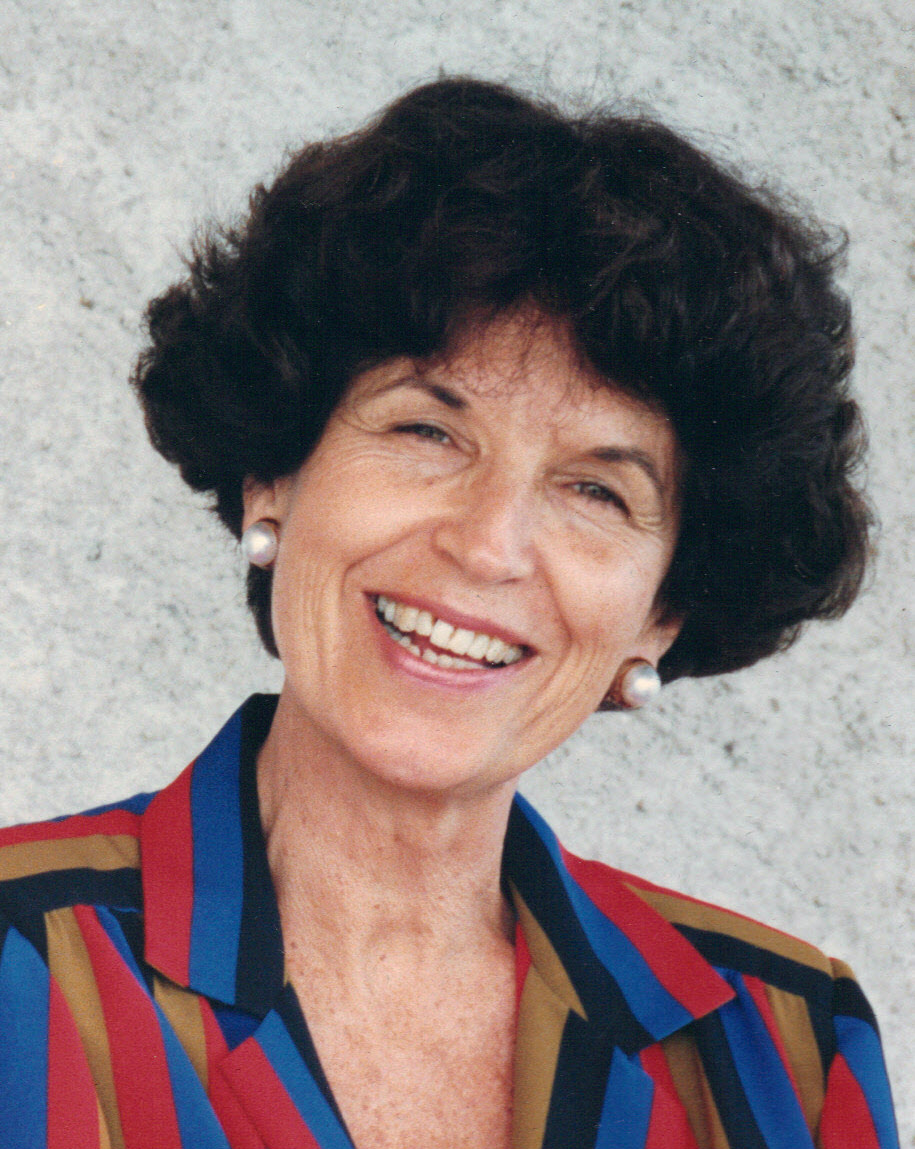
- Araújo in 1992
- Born: 20 January 1934; Bogotá, D.C., Colombia
- Died: 2 February 2015 (aged 81)
- Occupations: literary critic, professor
- Spouse: Pierre Albrecht de Martini (deceased)
- Children: Priscilla Albrecht; Gisèle Albrecht; Nicole Albrecht; Jocelyne Albrecht
- Relatives: Alfonso Araújo Gaviria (father)
- Writing career
- Language: Spanish
- Period: 1970—present
- Genres: novel, short story
- Subjects: feminism, women studies
- Notable awards: Platero Award; 1984 Post-nadaístas colombianas

Helena Araújo Ortiz (20 January 1934 – 2 February 2015) was a writer and an international professor of Latin American literature and women's studies. Her works of literary criticism have appeared in various Latin American and European literary journals.

== Personal life ==
Helena was born on 20 January 1934 in Bogotá, D.C., Colombia, the second of four children to Alfonso Araújo Gaviria and Emma Ortiz Márquez. She married Pierre Albrecht de Martini with whom she had four daughters: Priscilla, Gisèle, Nicole and Jocelyne. She spent her childhood and adolescence between Colombia and Venezuela, Brazil, and the United States where her father was stationed as a diplomat; she attended her high school senior year at Immaculata High School, in Washington, D.C. (1948-1949) graduating at the age of 15. She continued her education with studies in literature at the University of Maryland (1949-1950). Back in Colombia she pursued studies in literature and philosophy at the National University of Colombia until 1951 when she got married. In 1971 she and her daughters moved to Switzerland where shortly thereafter she became a widow and where she has remained ever since. She continued her education in literature and philosophy at the University of Geneva and the University of Lausanne.

== Career ==
She has published numerous literary criticism articles, several fiction books, multiple short stories and essays. She has been translated from Spanish into English, French, Italian and German. She has taught Latin American culture and literature at the Popular University of Lausanne, Switzerland (1994-2002) and has presented numerous seminars and courses internationally about Latin American women writers.

=== Recognition ===
She is the recipient of literary prizes including the 1984 Platero Award by the Spanish Book Club of the United Nations in Geneva for her essay Post-nadaístas colombianas. In 2005 Lausanne District and the Embassy of Colombia in Switzerland gave tribute to Araújo for her work in literature. In 2009 Araújo was honoured during the VI Gathering of Colombian Women Writers; El Tiempo published a short memoir that was presented during the tribute.

== Selected works ==
Books

- Araújo, Helena (1970). La"M" de las Moscas (short story anthology) (in Spanish). Bogotá: Tercer Mundo. OCLC 1968681.
- — (1976). Signos y Mensajes (literary criticism) (in Spanish). Bogotá: Colombia, Institute of Culture. OCLC 2735167.
- — (1981). Fiesta en Teusaquillo (novel) (in Spanish). Bogotá: Plaza & Janés. OCLC 8069072.
- — (1989). La Scherezada Criolla (literary criticism) (in Spanish). Bogotá: National University of Colombia. ISBN 9789581700479. OCLC 20452454.
- —; et al. (2003). Ardores y Furores (short story anthology) (in Spanish). Bogotá: Planeta. ISBN 9789584205650. OCLC 53047777.
- — (2007). Las Cuitas de Carlota (novel) (in Spanish). Medellín: Hombre Nuevo. ISBN 978-9588245423. OCLC 243824310.
- — (2009). Esposa Fugada y Otros Cuentos Viajeros (short story anthology) (in Spanish). Medellín: Hombre Nuevo. ISBN 978-9588245652. OCLC 456670106.
- — (2021). Adelaida: 1848 (historical novel) (in Spanish). Bogotá: National University of Colombia. ISBN 9789587945669.
- — (2022). Fiesta en Teusaquillo (novel) (in Spanish). Bogotá: Universidad de los Andes, Universidad EAFIT, Universidad Nacional de Colombia. ISBN 9789587982039.

Chapters

- Arciniegas, Germán, ed. (1988). "Siete Novelistas Colombianas". Manual de Literatura Colombiana (essay anthology) (in Spanish). Bogotá: Procultura & Planeta. ISBN 978-9586142656. OCLC 18907822.
- Ortega, Julio, ed. (2003). "Sobre Las Marquecianas". Gaborio: Artes De Releer a Gabriel García Márquez (essay anthology) (in Spanish). Mexico City: Jorale. pp. 227–238. ISBN 9789685863001. OCLC 56087816.
- Correas Leal, Celia, ed. (2003). "Asthmatic". Short Stories by Latin American Women: The Magic And The Real (short story anthology). foreword by Isabel Allende. New York City: Modern Library. ISBN 9780812967074. OCLC 50272789.
