= 1942 Colombian presidential election =

Presidential elections were held in Colombia on 3 May 1942. The result was a victory for Alfonso López Pumarejo of the Liberal Party, who received 58.6% of the vote. He took office on 7 August.

Pumarejo's only opponent, Carlos Arango Vélez, was also a Liberal Party member. Whilst Pumajero received support from the Communist Party, Vélez was supported by the Conservative Party.

There was violence during the election campaign.

== Results ==
Candidate	Party	Votes	%
Alfonso López Pumarejo	Colombian Liberal Party	673,169	58.65
Carlos Arango Vélez	Colombian Liberal Party	474,637	41.35
Total		1,147,806	100.00
Registered voters/turnout		2,056,366	–
Source: Nohlen
