= Julio Londoño Paredes =

Colombian Army officer and diplomat

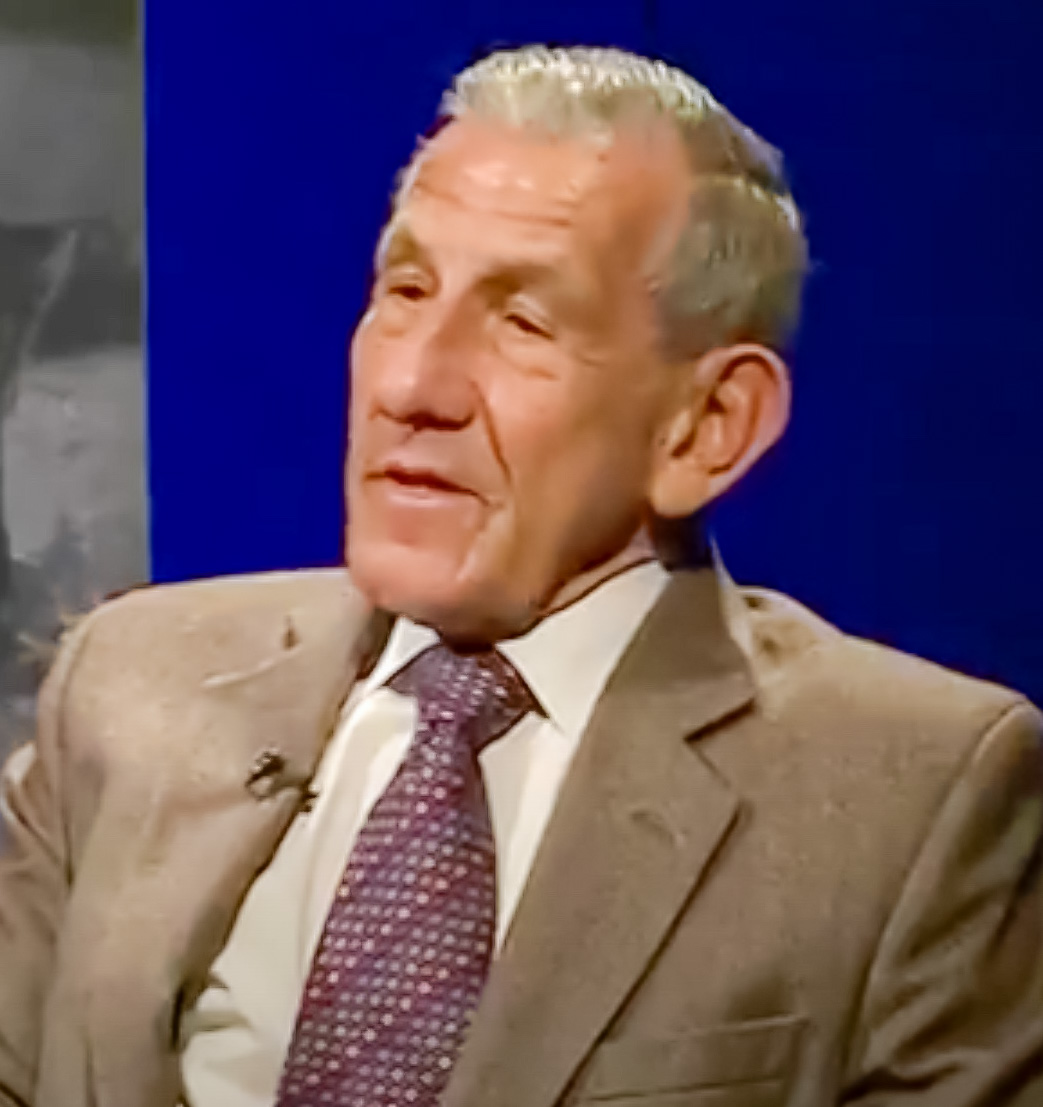
- Londoño in 2018

Colombia Ambassador to Cuba
- In office 1998–2010
- President: Andrés Pastrana Arango (1998-2002); Álvaro Uribe Vélez (2002-2010)
- Preceded by: Alberto Villamizar Cárdenas
- Succeeded by: Gustavo Adolfo Bell Lemus

23rd Permanent Representative of Colombia to the United Nations
- In office 22 September 1994 – 18 September 1998
- President: Ernesto Samper Pizano
- Preceded by: Luis Fernando Jaramillo Correa
- Succeeded by: Alfonso Valdivieso Sarmiento

Permanent Representative of Colombia to the Organization of American States
- In office 11 September 1990 – 22 September 1994
- President: César Gaviria Trujillo
- Preceded by: Leopoldo Villar Borda
- Succeeded by: Fabio Villegas Ramírez

Colombian Minister or Foreign Affairs
- In office 7 August 1986 – 7 August 1990
- President: Virgilio Barco Vargas
- Preceded by: Augusto Ramírez Ocampo
- Succeeded by: Luis Fernando Jaramillo Correa

Colombia Ambassador to Panama
- In office 1983–1986
- President: Belisario Betancur Cuartas

Personal details
- Born: 10 July 1938 (age 88) Bogotá, D.C., Colombia
- Spouse: Constanza Fajardo Solano
- Children: Andrés Londoño Fajardo; Isabel Cristina Londoño Fajardo; Daniel Eduardo Londoño Fajardo

Military service
- Branch/service: National Army of Colombia
- Years of service: 1957–1969
- Rank: Lieutenant Colonel
- Battles/wars: Colombian Civil War

Julio Londoño Paredes (born 10 July 1938) is a retired Colombian Army Lieutenant Colonel and diplomat. He has served as Colombia's Minister or Foreign Affairs, Permanent Representative of Colombia to the United Nations, Permanent Representative of Colombia to the Organization of American States, and Ambassador of Colombia to Panama, and Cuba. During his Ambassadorship in Cuba he was commissioned to represent Colombia at the International Court of Justice to protect sovereign claims on the Archipelago of San Andrés, Providencia and Santa Catalina by Nicaragua.

== Personal life ==
Born on 10 July 1938 in Bogotá, Colombia to Julio Londoño Londoño and Isabel Paredes Manrique. He married Constanza Fajardo Solano with whom he had three children: Andrés, Isabel Cristina and Daniel Eduardo.

== Selected works ==
- Londoño Paredes, Julio (1990). La frontera terrestre colombo-venezolana [The Colombian-Venezuelan Terrestrial Border]. Historia colombiana (in Spanish). Bogotá: Bank of the Republic. ISBN 978-958-9028-64-3. OCLC 24431038.
- Londoño Paredes, Julio (1973). Derecho territorial de Colombia [Territorial Law of Colombia]. Colección de oro del militar colombiano (in Spanish). Vol. 5. Bogotá: Impr. y Litografía de las Fuerzas Militares. OCLC 1727957.
- Londoño Paredes, Julio (1976). Cuestiones de límites de Colombia [Issues of Colombian Fronties]. Breviarios colombianos (in Spanish). Bogotá: Editorial Retina. OCLC 2982007.
- Londoño Paredes, Julio (1948). Geopolítica de Colombia [Colombian Geopolitics] (National government publication) (in Spanish). Bogotá: Ministry of War. OCLC 17959564.
