= Fernando Londoño =

Colombian politician, lawyer, and economist

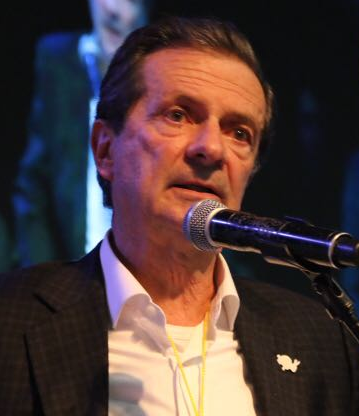

Minister of the Interior and Justice
- In office 27 December 2002 – 7 August 2004
- President: Álvaro Uribe Vélez
- Preceded by: Position established
- Succeeded by: Sabas Pretelt de la Vega

Minister of the Interior
- In office 7 August 2002 – 27 December 2002
- President: Álvaro Uribe Vélez
- Preceded by: Armando Estrada Villa
- Succeeded by: Position abolished

Personal details
- Born: Fernando Londoño Hoyos; 27 December 1944 (age 81) Manizales, Caldas, Colombia
- Party: Conservative
- Spouse(s): Patricia Villa Posse (1968-1975); María Margarita Camargo Espinosa (1978-present)
- Relations: Fernando Londoño y Londoño (father)
- Children: Cristina Londoño Villa; Rosario Londoño Villa; Tatiana Londoño Camargo; Fernando Londoño Camargo
- Education: Pontifical Xavierian University (LLB, 1967)
- Profession: Lawyer

Fernando Londoño Hoyos (born 27 December 1944) is a Colombian politician, lawyer, and economist. A longtime member of the Colombian Conservative Party, Londoño served as the 1st Minister of the Interior and Justice of Colombia from 2002 to 2004 during the Administration of President Álvaro Uribe Vélez.

Londoño has worked as a journalist since being removed from government for corruption. He is a columnist and opinion writer for several Colombian newspapers. He also hosts a radio talk show, La Hora de la Verdad.

Londoño was wounded in a targeted bombing in Bogotá on 15 May 2012. Two people on a motorbike attached an explosive device to his car shortly before the explosion. Londoño survived the terrorist attack, but the blast killed his driver and a police escort. The attack, which took place in Bogota's financial district, injured twenty bystanders.

He has been found guilty and sentenced in two occasions in cases dealing with corruption and insider trading. He was banned from holding public office for 12 years.

== Personal life ==
Londoño was born on 27 December 1944 in Manizales to Fernando Londoño y Londoño and Melba Hoyos Botero. He attended the prestigious San Bartolomé La Merced School in Bogotá where he finished his primary and secondary studies, and latter attended the Pontifical Xavierian University where he graduated in 1967 with a Bachelor of Laws. On 7 December 1968 Londoño married colleague and fellow alumni, Patricia, He remarried in 1978, this time to María Margarita Camargo Espinosa. From his first marriage he had two daughters, Cristina (b 1969) and Rosario (b 1971); from his second and current marriage he has one daughter, Tatiana (b 1979), and one son, Fernando (b 1981).

== Career ==
=== Minister of the Interior and Justice ===
On 12 July 2002, then President-elect Álvaro Uribe Vélez ratified Londoño as his choice for Minister of the Interior. Upon taking office on 7 August 2002, Uribe sworn in his new Cabinet and Londoño as the 8th Minister of the Interior entrusting him with the Ministry of Justice and Law as well. He remained in that post until the ministries were reorganized and consolidated together to form the Ministry of the Interior and Justice, and Londoño reappointed as its 1st Minister.

== Selected works ==
- Fernando, Londoño Hoyos (1967). El Poder del Juez [The Power of the Judge] (Thesis/Dissertation) (in Spanish). Bogotá: Editorial Kelly. LCCN 68051044. OCLC 20496179.
- Fernando, Londoño Hoyos; Glen de Tobón, Maricielo (1979). Naturaleza y Estructura Jurídica de la Banca en América Latina: Legislación Vigente: Ponencia Presentada por la Secretaría General a la XII Reunión del Consejo de Gobernadores [Legal Nature and Structure of Banking in Latin America: Current Legislation: Report Submitted by the Secretariat General to the XII Meeting of the Council of Governors]. Cuadernos de la Biblioteca FELABAN (in Spanish). Bogotá: Editorial Kelly. LCCN 79126978. OCLC 5507578.
- Fernando, Londoño Hoyos (1981). Naturaleza y Destino de una Asociación Bancaria [Nature and Fate of a Banking Association]. Cuadernos de la Biblioteca FELABAN (in Spanish). Bogotá: Editorial Kelly. OCLC 33380893.
- Fernando, Londoño Hoyos (1996). La Parábola del Elefante [The Parable of the Elephant] (in Spanish). Bogotá: Planeta. ISBN 9789589345627. LCCN 97125749. OCLC 35967529.
- Fernando, Londoño Hoyos (2004). Con Licencia Para Hablar [With A Licence To Speak]. Colección Actualidad (in Spanish). Bogotá: Random House Mondadori. ISBN 9789586392341. LCCN 2005422885. OCLC 60843067.
- Fernando, Londoño Hoyos (2007). Así Anduvimos el Camino [So We Walked The Road]. Colección Actualidad (in Spanish). Bogotá: Random House Mondadori. ISBN 9789586394062. LCCN 2007439862. OCLC 156909888.
