= Permanent Representative of Colombia to the United Nations =

Colombia's foremost diplomatic representative to the UN

- Representante Permanente de Colombia ante las Naciones Unidas
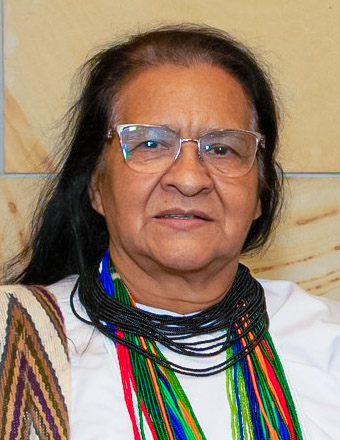
- Incumbent; Leonor Zalabata since 6 October 2022
- Style: Her Excellency
- Appointer: President of Colombia
- Inaugural holder: Alfonso López Pumarejo
- Formation: 1946
- Salary: US$10,000 (monthly)
- Website: Delegation's Website

The permanent representative of Colombia to the United Nations is the permanent representative of the Republic of Colombia to the United Nations, accredited as Concurrent Non-Resident Ambassador to the Republic of Kosovo, and Montenegro.

The permanent representative is Colombia's foremost diplomatic representative to UN, and Chief of Mission in New York City. The permanent representative however, is not the only high-ranking Colombian diplomat in the United States, the other two being the permanent representative of Colombia to the OAS in Washington, D.C., and the ambassador of Colombia to the United States, also in Washington D.C. The officeholder is charged with representing the interests of the President and Government of Colombia, and advancing the relations between Colombia and the general world community.

== List of permanent representatives ==
The following is a chronological list of those who have held the office:

#	Ambassadors	Years served
1	Alfonso López Pumarejo	1946–1948
2	Roberto Urdaneta Arbeláez	1948–1949
3	Fernando Londoño y Londoño	1949–1950
4	Elíseo Arango Ramos	1950–1952
5	Carlos Echeverri Cortés (a.i.)	1952–1953
6	Evaristo Sourdis Juliao	1953
7	Francisco José Urrutia Holguín	1953–1957
8	Alfonso Araújo Gaviria	1957–1961
9	Germán Zea Hernández	1961–1965
10	Alfonso Patiño Rosselli (a.i.)	1965–1967
11	Julio César Turbay Ayala	1967–1969
12	Joaquín Vallejo Arbeláez	1969–1970
13	Augusto Espinosa Valderrama	1970–1973
14	Aurelio Caicedo Ayerbe	1973–1975
15	Germán Zea Hernández	1975–1977
16	José Fernando Botero (a.i.)	1977–1978
17	Indalecio Liévano Aguirre	1978–1982
18	Carlos Sanz de Santamaría	1982–1983
19	Carlos Albán Holguín	1983–1987
20	Enrique Peñalosa Camargo	1987–1990
21	Fernando Cepeda Ulloa	1991
22	Luis Fernando Jaramillo Correa	1992–1994
23	Julio Londoño Paredes	1994–1998
24	Alfonso Valdivieso Sarmiento	1998–2004
25	María Ángela Holguín	2004–2006
26	Claudia Blum	2006–2010
27	Néstor Osorio Londoño	2010–2014
28	María Emma Mejía Vélez	2014–2018
29	Guillermo Fernández de Soto	2018–2022
30	Leonor Zalabata	2022–present
