= Gustavo Adolfo Carvajal =

Colombian economist

24th Colombia Ambassador to France
- In office 8 February 2011 – 5 November 2013
- President: Juan Manuel Santos Calderón
- Preceded by: Fernando Cepeda Ulloa
- Succeeded by: Federico Renjifo Vélez

Personal details
- Born: Gustavo Adolfo Carvajal Sinisterra; 17 August 1961 (age 65) Santiago de Cali, Valle del Cauca, Colombia
- Spouse: Juana Isabel Cabal Cabal
- Children: María Antonia Carvajal Cabal; Mario Carvajal Cabal; Juanita Carvajal Cabal
- Education: Adelphi University (BEcon); Babson College (MBA)
- Profession: Economist

Gustavo Adolfo Carvajal Sinisterra (born 17 August 1961) is a Colombian economist who served as the 24th Ambassador of Colombia to France. Carvajal has worked for more than 25 years in the public sector as President of Grupo Editorial Norma and President of Bico International SA.

== Ambassadorship ==
On 19 October 2010 President Juan Manuel Santos Calderón designated Carvajal to replace Fernando Cepeda Ulloa as Ambassador of Colombia to France dually accredited as Non-Resident Ambassador of Colombia to Monaco; he was sworn in on 8 February 2011 in a ceremony at the Palace of Nariño. Carvajal presented his Letters of Credence to the President of France Nicolas Sarkozy on 6 June 2011, and to His Most Serene Highness Prince Albert II of Monaco on 1 March 2012. By means of a presidential decree, Carvajal was further given, by virtue of his office, the accreditation of Non-Resident Ambassador of Colombia to Algeria, but has yet to present his credentials to the Algerian head of state.
