= Sabas Pretelt de la Vega =

Colombian economist and businessman (born 1946)

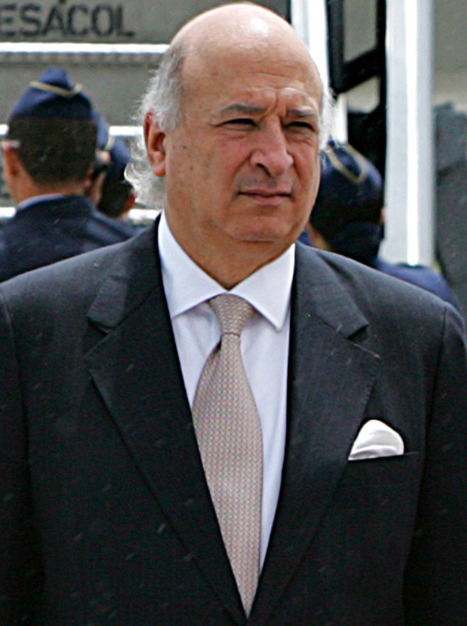
- Minister Pretelt in Brazil in August 2006

Colombia Ambassador to Italy
- In office October 4, 2006 – September 8, 2010
- President: Álvaro Uribe Vélez
- Preceded by: Luis Camilo Osorio Izasa
- Succeeded by: Juan Manuel Prieto Montoya

Colombia Ambassador to Greece
- In office 2006 – September 8, 2010
- President: Álvaro Uribe Vélez
- Preceded by: Luis Camilo Osorio Izasa
- Succeeded by: Juan Manuel Prieto Montoya

Colombia Ambassador to San Marino
- In office February 20, 2007 – September 8, 2010
- President: Álvaro Uribe Vélez
- Preceded by: Luis Camilo Osorio Izasa
- Succeeded by: Juan Manuel Prieto Montoya

Colombia Ambassador to Malta
- In office May 10, 2007 – September 8, 2010
- President: Álvaro Uribe Vélez
- Preceded by: Luis Camilo Osorio Izasa
- Succeeded by: Juan Manuel Prieto Montoya

Colombia Ambassador to Cyprus
- In office September 4, 2007 – September 8, 2010
- President: Álvaro Uribe Vélez
- Preceded by: Luis Camilo Osorio Izasa
- Succeeded by: Juan Manuel Prieto Montoya

2nd Minister of the Interior and Justice
- In office November, 2003 – August 22, 2006
- President: Álvaro Uribe Vélez
- Deputy: Luis Hernando Angarita Figueredo
- Preceded by: Fernando Londoño Hoyos
- Succeeded by: Carlos Holguín Sardi

Personal details
- Born: April 11, 1946 (age 80) Cartagena, Bolívar, Colombia
- Party: Conservative
- Spouse(s): Pilar Arango Gomez (divorced) Ana Luisa de Zubiría (m. 2006)
- Children: 4
- Education: University of the Andes; University of Valle
- Profession: Economist

Sabas Pretelt de la Vega (born April 11, 1946) is a Colombian economist and businessman, who served as Colombian Minister of the Interior and Justice, and Ambassador to the Colombian missions in Italy, Greece, Cyprus, San Marino, and Malta. He was sentenced to six years and eight months in prison in April 2015 for corruption after the Yidispolítica scandal where Yidis Medina supposedly took a bribe from Pretelt. He was released in April 2018 under good behavior, in which he set up an education system for the soldiers in the naval base he was detained in.

== Personal life ==
Sabas Pretelt de la Vega was born in Cartagena de Indias in the Department of Bolívar, Colombia on April 11, 1946. He had three children with his ex-wife Pilar Arango Gomez: María Vanessa, Verónica, and Mauricio. Pretelt married fellow Colombian economist Ana Luisa de Zubiría on September 11, 2006, in a private ceremony at the home of his sister, Mercé Pretelt de la Vega. The godparents were President of Fedegán, José Félix Lafaurie, and the Attorney General of Colombia, Mario Germán Iguarán Arana. The nuptials were hastened due to Pretelt's diplomatic appointment in Italy and left that same day to Rome.

He graduated from the Liceo de Cervantes, he also graduated from the Universidad de Los Andes (Colombia) as humanist and from the Universidad del Valle as an economist. He has a master's degree in Business Administration and has been a professor at several Colombian universities.

Sabas Pretelt de la Vega was the Colombian minister of the Interior and Justice between November 2003 and September 2006. Pretelt de la Vega was a member of President Álvaro Uribe's cabinet as Minister of Interior and Justice, being the first non-lawyer to occupy that position. He is credited for bringing significant legislative achievements to effectively improve the fight against drug trafficking and the country's stability. During this tenure as Minister, he served several times as Minister in charge of the presidential office. His successor is Carlos Holguín Sardi, since 2006.

Prior to being a member of Álvaro Uribe's cabinet, Sabas Pretelt was between 1988 and 2003 the president of FENALCO, the Colombian National Association of Commerce. Pretelt had a successful career in the private sector, both as entrepreneur and President of the National Council of Entrepreneurs, a coordinating body of all the private sector organizations in Colombia. In that quality, he also represented several times Colombia's employers in the Assembly of the International Labour Organisation and in other regional organizations such as ALAS, the Latin American Association of Supermarkets and the Food Marketing Institute of the United States, among others.

In the academic field, Pretelt was a professor of Greek culture and pre-Socratic philosophy in the La Salle University, and of Projects Evaluation in the University of Valle. He has published numerous articles in newspapers and magazines and is the author of the books "San Andres: Centro Financiero Internacional" and "Privatizaciones, Apertura, y Desarrollo."

Due his involvement in the corruption scandal known as Yidispolítica he was banned from holding any public office for twelve years and was sentenced to six years in prison where he stayed in a naval base in Cartagena. He was released after three years for good behavior after setting up education services for the uneducated in the naval base. His letter of resignation was finally accepted by President Juan Manuel Santos on the eve of the nomination of his successor as ambassador.
