= Luis Fernando Jaramillo Correa =

Colombian politician (1935–2011)

22nd Permanent Representative of Colombia to the United Nations
- In office 22 January 1992 – 22 September 1994
- President: César Gaviria Trujillo
- Preceded by: Fernando Cepeda Ulloa
- Succeeded by: Julio Londoño Paredes

Colombian Minister of Foreign Affairs
- In office 7 August 1990 – 20 November 1991
- President: César Gaviria Trujillo
- Preceded by: Julio Londoño Paredes
- Succeeded by: Noemí Sanín Posada

Colombian Minister of Public Works and Transport
- In office 7 August 1986 – 1989
- President: Virgilio Barco Vargas

Personal details
- Born: 24 July 1935 Barranquilla, Atlántico, Colombia
- Died: 23 November 2011 (aged 76) Bogotá, Colombia
- Party: Liberal
- Spouse: Gladys Corredor Morales (m. 1966)
- Children: Luis Fernando Jaramillo Corredor; Mónica Jaramillo Corredor; Mario Jaramillo Corredor
- Education: National University of Colombia
- Profession: Civil Engineer

Luis Fernando Jaramillo Correa (24 July 1935 – 23 November 2011) worked for Goldman Sachs International as an international advisor. He also served on the boards of directors of Interbolsa, S.A., Gerdau-Dicao, S.A. and Trident Gold SAS.

His distinguished political career in Colombia included terms as vice president, Minister of Public Works and Transport, minister for economic development, minister of mining and energy, Minister of Foreign Affairs, and minister of the interior. He also served as the 22nd Permanent Representative of Colombia to the United Nations, in New York.

Jaramillo earned a civil engineering degree from National University of Colombia in Medellin and also studied at the London School of Economics.

== Personal life ==
He was born on 24 July 1935 in Barranquilla, the first-born son of Mario Jaramillo Echaverria and Helvia Correa Mejía. In 1966, he married Gladys Corredor Morales in Bogotá, and together they had three children: Luis, Mario, and Mónica.

He died on 23 November 2011 in Bogotá.
