= Juan Martín Caicedo =

Colombian politician

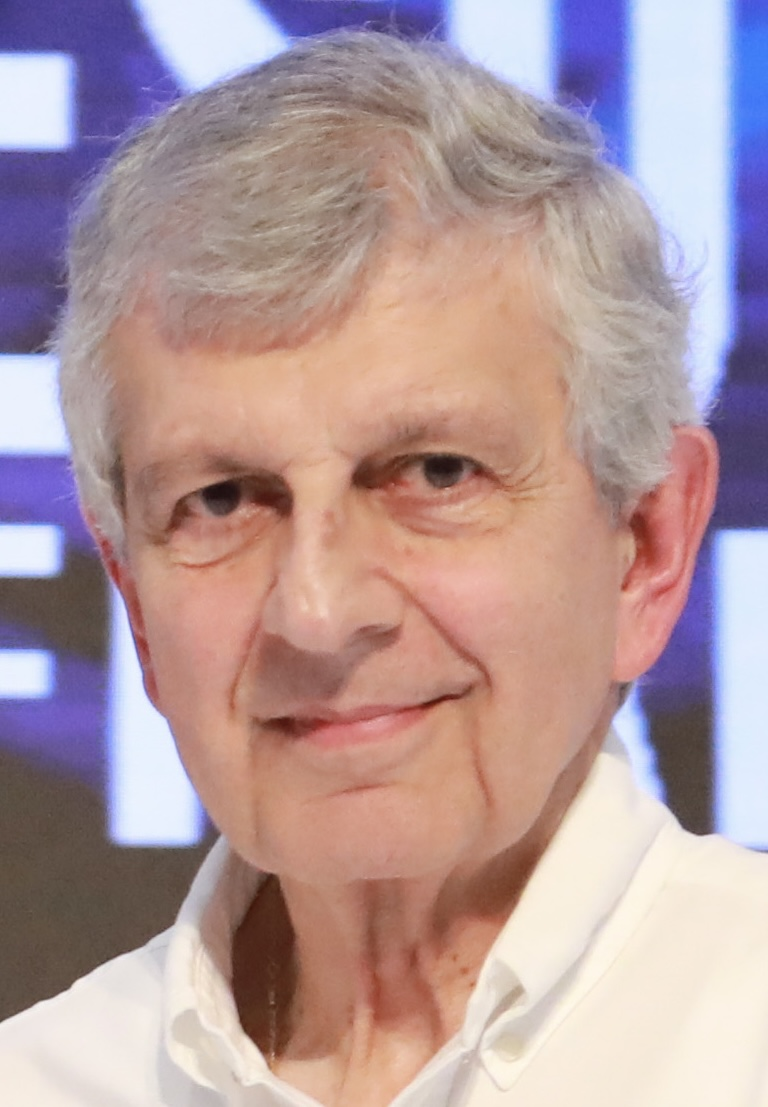

Mayor of Bogotá
- In office 1 January 1990 – 25 March 1992
- Preceded by: Andrés Pastrana Arango
- Succeeded by: Sonia Durán Smela

Senator of Colombia
- In office 20 July 1994 – 19 July 2002

Personal details
- Born: 14 September 1947 (age 79) Cali, Valle del Cauca, Colombia
- Party: Colombian Liberal Party

Juan Martín Caicedo Ferrer (born 1947) is a Colombian politician and lawyer who has served in the Senate of Colombia and as the mayor of Bogotá.

== Biography ==
He was born in 1947 in Cali. He is a member of the Caicedo family, a prominent family in the independence of the colonies from the Spanish Empire. He studied economics at Javeriana University and specialized at the universities of Louvain and Antwerp, both in Belgium.

=== Political career ===
He ran for mayor in the 1998 elections and lost, and he ran again in 1990 and won. In 1992 he was arrested for embezzling funds from the Bogotá City Council, which led to him losing his position as mayor; he was acquitted of his crimes by the Supreme Court of Justice in 1996 on the terms that he provide compensation to the city. He was a senator between 1994 and 2002, and has served in multiple other offices.
