= Fernando Cepeda Ulloa =

Colombian political scientist, professor and diplomat

23rd Colombia Ambassador to France
- In office 17 November 2006 – 8 February 2011
- President: Álvaro Uribe Vélez
- Preceded by: Miguel Gómez Martínez
- Succeeded by: Gustavo Adolfo Carvajal Sinisterra

Permanent Representative of Colombia to the Organization of American States
- In office August 1997 – September 1998
- President: Ernesto Samper Pizano
- Preceded by: Carlos Holmes Trujillo García
- Succeeded by: Luis Alfredo Ramos Botero

Colombia Ambassador to Canada
- In office 5 February 1992 – January 1994
- President: César Gaviria Trujillo
- Preceded by: Germán Montoya Vélez

21st Permanent Representative of Colombia to the United Nations
- In office 2 January 1991 – 22 January 1992
- President: César Gaviria Trujillo
- Preceded by: Enrique Peñalosa Camargo
- Succeeded by: Luis Fernando Jaramillo Correa

19th Colombia Ambassador to the United Kingdom
- In office 11 July 1988 – 9 November 1990
- President: Virgilio Barco Vargas
- Preceded by: Bernardo Ramírez Rodríguez
- Succeeded by: Virgilio Barco Vargas

31st Minister of Communications of Colombia
- In office 17 May 1987 – 9 June 1988
- President: Virgilio Barco Vargas
- Preceded by: Edmundo López Gómez
- Succeeded by: Pedro Martín Leyes

Ministers of Government of Colombia
- In office 7 August 1986 – 17 May 1987
- President: Virgilio Barco Vargas
- Preceded by: Jaime Castro Castro
- Succeeded by: César Gaviria Trujillo

Minister Plenipotentiary of Colombia to the United States
- In office October 1979 – January 1982
- President: Julio César Turbay Ayala

Personal details
- Born: 28 January 1938 (age 88) Bogotá, D.C., Colombia
- Spouse: Gloria María Espinosa
- Children: Manuel José Cepeda Espinosa; Adriana Cepeda Espinosa
- Education: National University of Colombia (BPhil, 1959; LLD, 1962); The New School (MA, 1962)
- Profession: Political Scientist

Fernando Cepeda Ulloa (born 28 January 1938) is a Colombian political scientist, professor and diplomat. He has served as Ambassador of Colombia to the United Kingdom, to France, and to Canada, as Permanent Representative of Colombia to the United Nations and to the Organization of American States, and as Chargé d'affaires of the Colombian Legation to the United States as Minister Plenipotentiary.

== Diplomatic career ==
On 9 July 1988, President Barco reassigned Cepeda once again, but this time appointing him Ambassador of Colombia to the United Kingdom, where he travelled to the next day and presented his Letters of Credence to Her Majesty Elizabeth II Queen Elizabeth II of the Commonwealth Realms on July 11 in a ceremony at Buckingham Palace.

On 26 December 1990, President César Gaviria Trujillo announced that he was appointing Cepeda to serve as the 21st Permanent Representative of Colombia to the United Nations; Cepeda presented his Letters of Credence to the UN Secretary-General Javier Pérez de Cuéllar on 2 January 1991 at the United Nations Headquarters in New York City. He was reassigned later that year and appointed Ambassador of Colombia to Canada by President Gaviria. He presented his Letters of Credence to the Governor General of Canada, The Right Honourable Ray Hnatyshyn, on 5 February 1992 in Rideau Hall. Cepeda is also a member of Washington D.C.–based think tank the Inter-American Dialogue.
