= Indalecio Liévano =

Colombian politician and diplomat (1917–1982)

Indalecio Liévano Aguirre

17th Permanent Representative of Colombia to the United Nations
- In office 1978–1982
- President: Julio César Turbay Ayala
- Preceded by: José Fernando Botero
- Succeeded by: Carlos Sanz de Santamaría

33rd President of the United Nations General Assembly
- In office 1978–1978
- Preceded by: Lazar Mojsov
- Succeeded by: Salim Ahmed Salim

Minister of Foreign Affairs
- In office 7 August 1974 – 20 September 1978
- President: Alfonso López Michelsen (1974–1978); Julio César Turbay Ayala (1978)
- Preceded by: Alfredo Vázquez Carrizosa
- Succeeded by: Diego Uribe Vargas

Senator of Colombia
- In office 20 July 1970 – 7 August 1974

Member of the Chamber of Representatives
- In office 20 July 1964 – 20 July 1970
- Constituency: Cundinamarca

Personal details
- Born: 24 July 1917 Bogotá, Cundinamarca, Colombia
- Died: 29 March 1982 (aged 64) Bogotá, D.C., Colombia
- Party: Liberal
- Education: Pontifical Xavierian University
- Profession: Lawyer, Political Scientist, Economist

Indalecio Liévano Aguirre (24 July 1917 – 29 March 1982) was a Colombian politician and diplomat, who as the 17th Permanent Representative of Colombia to the United Nations served as the 33rd President of the United Nations General Assembly in 1978. He also served as Colombia's Minister of Foreign Affairs and Minister Plenipotentiary to Cuba.

== Biography ==
Liévano Aguirre was born on 24 July 1917 in Bogotá, Colombia to Nicolás Liévano Danies and Emilia Aguirre.

In 1939, Liévano Aguirre studied Philosophy and Letters at the Colegio Mayor de San Bartolomé and went on to receive a degree in law at the Pontificia Universidad Javeriana, graduating in 1944. While at La Javeriana, Liévano Aguirre led a student committee that would go on to organise a major strike in May 1938.

== See also ==
- Liévano–Brutus treaty
