= Aurelio Caicedo Ayerbe =

Colombian lawyer and diplomat

- UN Photo of Aurelio Caicedo Ayerbe

14th Permanent Representative of Colombia to the United Nations
- In office 13 September 1973 – 2 October 1975
- President: Misael Pastrana Borrero (1973–1974); Alfonso López Michelsen (1974–1975)
- Preceded by: Augusto Espinosa Valderrama
- Succeeded by: Germán Zea Hernández

Senator of Colombia
- In office 20 July 1962 – 20 July 1966

Colombia Ambassador to the Holy See
- In office 11 December 1955 – 15 July 1957
- President: Gustavo Rojas Pinilla
- Preceded by: José Antonio Montalvo
- Succeeded by: Carlos Arango Vélez

Minister of National Education
- In office 7 August 1954 – 26 August 1955
- President: Gustavo Rojas Pinilla
- Preceded by: Daniel Henao Henao
- Succeeded by: Gabriel Betancur Mejía

7th Minister of Labour
- In office 13 June 1953 – 7 August 1954
- President: Gustavo Rojas Pinilla
- Preceded by: Raimundo Emiliani Román
- Succeeded by: Cástor Jaramillo Arrubla

Member of the Chamber of Representatives
- In office 20 July 1951 – 13 June 1953
- Constituency: Cauca

Personal details
- Born: 4 May 1921 Popayán, Cauca, Colombia
- Died: 23 July 1998 Bogotá, Cundinamarca, Colombia
- Spouse: Luz Marina Cruz Lozada (1955–1998)
- Children: Pablo Caicedo Cruz; Andrés Caicedo Cruz; Santiago Caicedo Cruz
- Education: University of Cauca (LLD)
- Profession: Lawyer
- Awards: List of Awards Order of Orange-Nassau – The Netherlands Civil Order of Alfonso X, the Wise – Spain Papal Order of Piana – Holy See Order of Boyacá – Colombia

Aurelio Caicedo Ayerbe (4 May 1921 – 23 July 1998) was a Colombian lawyer and diplomat. He served as the 14th Permanent Representative of Colombia to the United Nations and as Ambassador of Colombia to the Holy See.

== Personal life ==
In 1955, while serving as Minister of National Education, Caicedo married the former Miss Colombia 1953, Luz Marina Cruz Lozada, in the city of Cali. Together they had three children: Pablo, Andrés, and Santiago.
