= Leonor Zalabata =

Colombian politician and writer (born 1954)

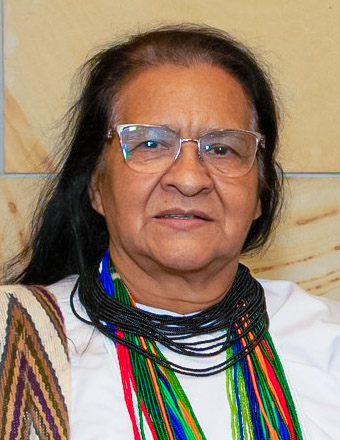

President of the United Nations Security Council
- In office June 1, 2026 – 1 July 2026
- Preceded by: Fu Cong
- Succeeded by: Zénon Mukongo Ngay

Permanent Representative of Colombia to the United Nations
- In office October 6, 2022 – August 7, 2026
- President: Gustavo Petro
- Preceded by: Guillermo Fernández de Soto

Personal details
- Born: Guneywya; July 5, 1954 (age 72) Pueblo Bello, Cesar, Colombia
- Party: Indigenous Authorities of Colombia (since 1991)
- Education: University of Antioquia

Leonor Zalabata Torres (née Guneywya; born July 5, 1954) is a Colombian Arhuaco politician, writer, chronicler and defender of human rights. Zabalata has worked for the vindication and rights of indigenous communities since her leadership role and was part of the Constituent Assembly of Colombia.

Diplomatic posts
Preceded by Guillermo Fernández de Soto	Permanent Representative of Colombia to the United Nations; 2022–2026	Incumbent
