= Flag of Bogotá =

Colombian municipal flag

Bogotá
- Use: Civil flag, civil and state ensign
- Proportion: 3:2
- Adopted: October 9, 1952

The flag of Bogotá was adopted as a symbol of the city on October 9, 1952, through decree 555 issued by the Office of Mayor.

It's formed by a yellow horizontal strip, which occupies the upper half, and a red horizontal strip, which complements the lower part. In the center is the coat of arms of the city. The yellow stripe represents justice, virtue and kindness while the red stripe represents liberty, health and charity.

The norm also specifies that for the use of the flag as a banner its proportions should be twice as wide as it is long, and for its use as a standard its proportion will be two and a half times the length of its width.

The origin of the flag goes back to the Independence Cry of July 20, 1810, in which the patriots identified with a yellow and red armband. The city authorities consulted the Colombian Academy of History on October 6, 1952, about the design the flag of the city, taking into account the tradition and history. In response, academics Enrique Ortega Ricaurte and Guillermo Hernández de Alba gave a report detailing the history of the armband used by the revolutionaries and suggesting adoption as the flag of the city.
