= Miguel Urrutia Montoya =

Colombian economist and author (1939–2024)

12th General Manager of the Bank of the Republic of Colombia
- In office 22 February 1993 – 3 January 2005
- President: César Gaviria Trujillo
- Preceded by: Francisco José Ortega Acosta
- Succeeded by: José Darío Uribe Escobar

5th Minister of Mines and Energy of Colombia
- In office 27 January 1977 – 3 October 1977
- President: Alfonso López Michelsen
- Preceded by: Jaime García Parra
- Succeeded by: Eduardo Gaitán Durán

Personal details
- Born: 20 April 1939 Bogotá, Colombia
- Died: 9 July 2024 (aged 85) Bogotá, Colombia
- Spouse: Elsa Pombo Kopp (1963–2024)
- Children: Elena Urrutia Pombo; Santiago Urrutia Pombo; Isabel Urrutia Pombo
- Education: Harvard University (BA); University of California, Berkeley (MA, PhD)
- Profession: Economist

Miguel Urrutia Montoya (20 April 1939 – 9 July 2024) was a Colombian economist and author, who served as Titular Professor of Economics at the University of the Andes in Bogotá. He served as 12th General Manager of the Bank of the Republic of Colombia from 1993 to 2004, and as 5th Colombian Minister of Mines and Energy in 1977 during the administration of Alfonso López Michelsen.

== Background ==
Urrutia finished his secondary education at Portsmouth Priory School, in Portsmouth, Rhode Island, where he graduated in 1957 with Bachiller cum laude. He then attended Harvard University graduating magna cum laude in 1961 with Bachelor of Economics. He continued to pursue his studies at the received a University of California, Berkeley, where he obtained his Master of Economics in 1964, and his PhD in Economics in 1967 with his dissertation on Labour Unions in Colombia, published by Yale University Press under the title History of Colombian Labor Movement. In 1982 he served as Deputy Rector of United Nations University in Tokyo, Japan. Among his most significant books on Colombian socio-economic history are: The Development of Colombian Labor Movement, Income Distribution in Colombia (With Albert Berry), Winners and Losers in Colombia's Economic Growth of the 1970s, and his most recent "Politica social para la equidad en Colombia: Historia y experiencias" (with Christian Robles-Baez) published in 2021 by Universidad de los Andes in Bogota.

== Personal life ==
Miguel Urrutia Montoya was born 20 April 1939 in Bogotá, D.C. to Francisco José Urrutia Holguín and Genoveva Montoya Williamson. He married Elsa Pombo Kopp in Bogotá on 3 August 1963, and together they have three children: Elena, Santiago, and Isabel.

Urrutia died in Bogotá on 9 July 2024, at the age of 85.
