= 1934 Colombian presidential election =

Presidential elections were held in Colombia on 11 February 1934. The result was a victory for Alfonso López Pumarejo of the Liberal Party, who received 99.6% of the vote. He took office on 7 August.

The Conservative Party alleged Liberal gerrymandering and called for the elections to be boycotted.

López ran a campaign emphasizing reform, welfare programs, liberal democracy, constitutional reform, education reform (moving away from Church-provided education to public education), expansion of male suffrage, land reform to redistribute idle land to the landless.

== Results ==
Candidate	Party	Votes	%
Alfonso López Pumarejo	Colombian Liberal Party	938,608	99.64
Eutiquio Timoté	Colombian Communist Party	1,974	0.21
Others		1,427	0.15
Total		942,009	100.00
Registered voters/turnout		1,542,441	–
Source: Nohlen, Historia Electoral Colombiana
