= Coat of arms of Bogotá =

Coat of arms of Bogotá (during colonial times)
- Colonial coat of arms of Bogotá

Versions
- Modern version in use
- Armiger: The Very Noble and Very Loyal City of Bogotá.
- Adopted: December 3, 1548
- Shield: Or, a bordure azure nine pomegranates in orle Or, an eagle displayed sable crowned Or holding in its talons pomegranates gules.
- Use: Emblem and official documents

The official coat of arms of the Capital District of Bogotá, the capital of Colombia, was granted by the Emperor Charles V to the New Kingdom of Granada on December 3, 1548 in Valladolid.

It was used by the Viceroyalty of New Granada until independence, when a new coat of arms was adopted for the new republic of Gran Colombia.

It continued to serve unofficially as the emblem of the city, but it was formally adopted as the coat of arms for the city of Bogotá by Accord 31 of 1932.

== Design and meaning ==
The coat of arms contains in the middle of the shield an imposing Imperial Eagle all in sable in a field of Or. The eagle is an imperial symbol, granted by Charles V and it holds in each claw a pomegranate in gules, symbol of New Granada.

Its border is azure with nine golden pomegranates, which represent the states that in that day formed the New Kingdom of Granada.

== See also ==
- Flag of Bogotá
