= Hernando Durán Dussán =

Colombian lawyer and politician

- Born: 1920; Bogotá
- Died: 4 September 1998 (aged 77–78); Kuala Lumpur
- Occupation: Politician

Hernando Durán Dussán (1920 – 4 September 1998) was a Colombian lawyer and politician. He was the Mayor of Bogotá and a candidate for the Presidency in 1990.

== Biography ==
Durán Dussán was born in Bogotá in 1920, of Huilan ancestry. He attended secondary school at La Salle in Bogotá and also attended Antonio Nariño College before receiving his license to practice law from the National University of Colombia.

In 1950, Durán Dussán participated in a political protest movement during the presidency of Mariano Ospina Pérez, for which he was sentenced to ten years in prison. He sought asylum in the United States and in France until a military junta seized control of the government in 1958 and granted him amnesty, enabling him to return to Colombia.

=== Political career ===
Durán Dussán served as the head of the Ministry of Housing under Guillermo León Valencia, the Ministry of Mines under Alberto Lleras Camargo, and the Ministry of Education under Alfonso López Michelsen.

In the middle of the 1980s he became the president of the Colombian Liberal Party. Durán was a staunch opponent of Luis Carlos Galán, the leader of the New Liberalism, and competed with him for the 1990 Liberal presidential nomination, but finished second to César Gaviria, who replaced Galán after the latter's assassination and won both the Liberal nomination and presidency. After his defeat, Durán retired, and became a supporter of Álvaro Uribe.

== Death ==
After his retirement from politics, Durán moved to Kuala Lumpur, Malaysia in order to visit his daughter Sonia, the wife of the Colombian ambassador to Malaysia. Durán died in Kuala Lumpur of a respiratory infection in 1998 at the age of 78. His remains were returned to Colombia.
