= Superior Mayor of Bogotá =

Head of the executive branch of the local government of Bogotá

Mayor of Bogotá
- Alcalde Mayor de Bogotá
- Coat of arms of Bogotá

- Flag of Bogotá

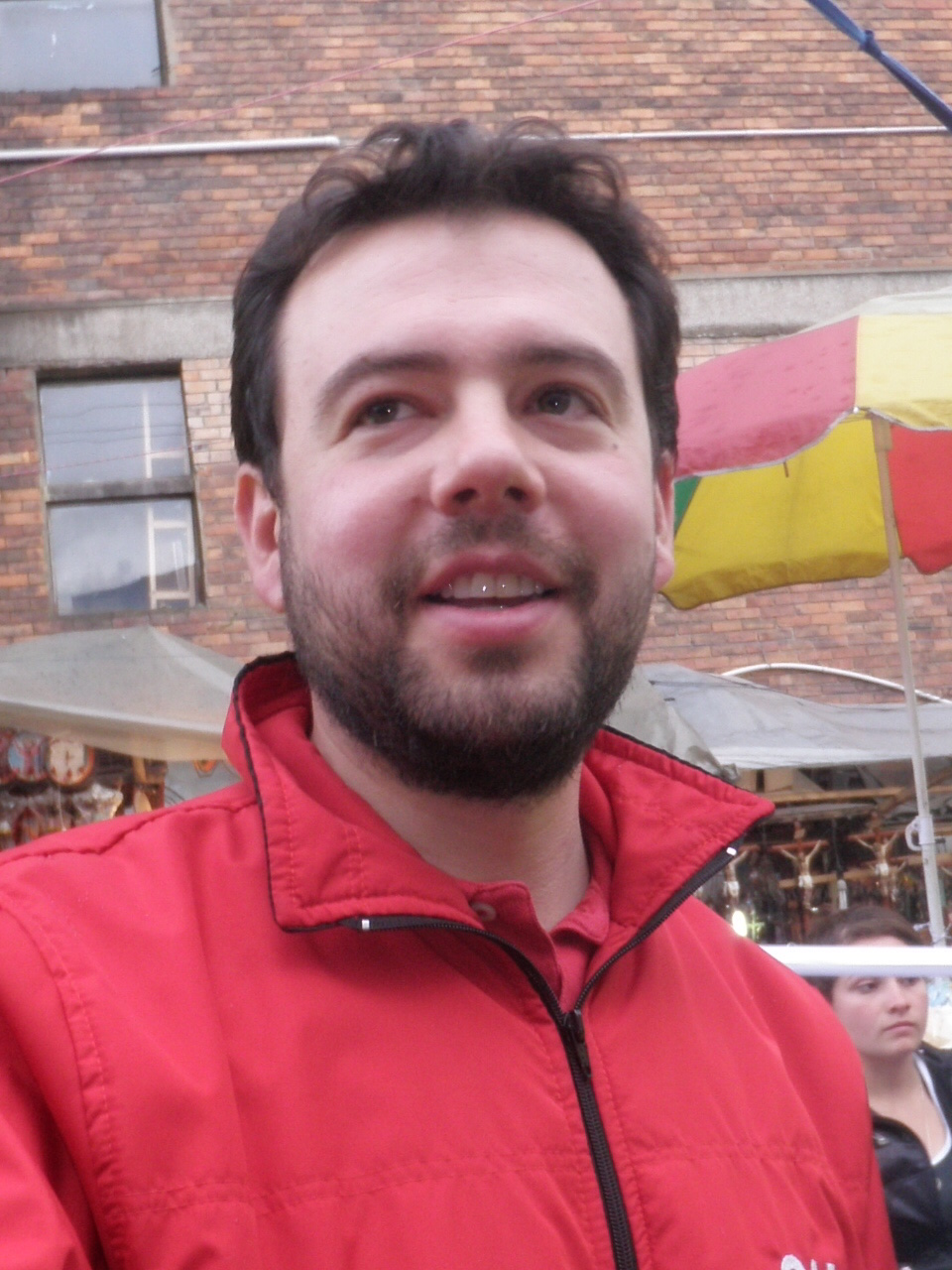
- Incumbent; Carlos Fernando Galán since 1 January 2024
- Government of Bogotá
- Style: The Most Excellent
- Seat: Palacio Liévano
- Term length: Four years (renewable once, non-consecutive)
- Inaugural holder: Gonzalo Jiménez de Quesada
- Formation: 1538
- Salary: $5.814,79 USD
- Website: https://bogota.gov.co/en

The superior mayor of Bogotá (Spanish: Alcalde Mayor de Bogotá) is the highest administrative authority of the Special District of Bogotá, and the head of the executive branch of the local government of Bogotá. The mayor heads the district's government alongside the districtal secretaries and the chiefs of the administrative departments.

The mayor is not the highest political authority of Bogotá, that distinction belonging to the District's City Council, which is charged with creating municipal ordinances and overseeing the mayor's duties. The mayor is elected every four years by popular vote and is usually considered by general opinion to be the second most important political post in Colombia second only to the President of the Republic. The Superior Mayor of Bogota's Office oversees twenty local municipalities (localidades) which each have their own local Mayors.

== Current mayor ==
The current mayor is Carlos Fernando Galán.

== Functions ==
The superior mayor of bogota is primarily tasked with executing the norms stipulated by the constitution, the law, and city ordinances approved by the city council.

As the highest police authority of the district they are tasked with maintaining public order, being subordinated on this matter only to the president. In this way the district's mayor office is different from other municipalities in Colombia where the mayors are subordinated on this matter to the governors of the respective departments. The superior mayor of Bogota has the same police authorities as all other Colombian mayors and governors within their respective jurisdictions such as elaborating police directives, commanding all police members assigned to the district, soliciting the help of the army during an emergency, ordering the demolition of buildings that pose a threat to public safety, regulating local commerce and the sell and distribution of liquor, amongst others.

As the supreme administrative authority and head of the local executive government they are charged with directing all public works, as well as supervising the continuous provision of all essential public services. As the judicial representative of the city, they and their delegates are competent to carry out contracts or agreements which are legally binding for the city itself.

The mayor also has normative prerogatives. They might create those regulations, resolutions or orders they consider necessary to carry out City Ordinances, mirroring the normative faculties the president has when it comes to implementing laws passed by Congress.

As for their administrative duties they can freely appoint and remove the secretaries of the various secretariats that make up the superior mayor's office and the managers of the decentralized entities linked to their office. They may also do the same with all the functionaries of the central sector of the dependencies overseen by their office who are appointed to their post. They are tasked with overseeing the conduct of all the public servants under their authority and are competent to impose disciplinary sanctions after due process to any of them.

In those dependencies that belong to the central sector and are ascribed to their office, they may freely create or eliminate posts, attribute said posts their functions, and decide the remuneration of those employees directly under their authority in accordance with the city's budget and in compliance with the law.

Every year they are tasked with presenting an inform of their administration to the city council.

== District administration ==
The district administration of Bogota is headed by the superior mayor and is made up of various entities belonging to the central sector, the decentralized sector, and the local municipalities. Though the Bogotá City Council forms part of the executive branch of the Colombian government, and is in charge of the administration of the city, it is not technically part of the district administration since it has no executive functions related to the administration of the city. Also the sub national oversight bodies that operate in Bogota such as the office of the Comptroller of Bogota and the ombudsman office of Bogota are not part of the District Government and are completely independent from the mayor's office.

The Superior Mayor of Bogota, as the highest official within the district administration has various and ample prerogatives when it comes to the entities that make up the Central and decentralized sectors and the local municipalities. Their influence is greater in those entities that make up the central sector, lesser in the decentralized entities, and limited in the local municipalities.

=== Centralized and decentralized entities ===
The entities that make up the district administration are created by law or by city ordinances. It is through this entities that the mayor can execute their functions. Centralized entities do not have legal personality and are all under the direct responsibility of the superior mayor's office. Decentralized entities on the other hand are administratively autonomous and have judicial personality, nevertheless the managers in charge of the decentralized entities as well as the majority of their respective boards are appointed by the mayor.

==== Centralized dependencies ====
The centralized entities that make up the central sector are:

- The General Secretariat.
- The District Secretariat of Governance.
- The Official Firefighter's brigade.
- The District Secretariat of Finance.
- The District Secretariat of Planning.
- The District Secretariat of Economic Development.
- The District Secretariat of Education.
- The District Secretariat of Health.
- The District Secretariat of Social Integration.
- The District Secretariat of Culture, Sports and Recreation.
- The District Secretariat of the Environment.
- The District Secretariat of Mobility.
- The District Secretariat of Habitat.
- The District Secretariat of Women's issues.

==== Decentralized entities ====
Decentralized entities, as stated above are somewhat autonomous. Nevertheless, its top officials are appointed by the Superior Mayor's Office and thus tend to follow the same political lines as the city's administration. They have judicial personality which allows them to file lawsuits and be sued on their own responsibility. They have an independent budget which may not be modified by the mayor once approved by the council. Some of this centralized entities operate as part of the public sector, while others, called vinculated decentralized entities, operate as private enterprises own or partly owned by the city's government. Each decentralized entity is ascribed(if it belongs to the public sector) or vinculated (if it operates as a private enterprise) to a centralized dependency. For instance the Lottery of Bogota (a private enterprise wholly owned by the city's Government) is vinculated to the Distrital Secretariat of the Treasury.

===== Notable examples of (public) decentralized entities =====
- Special Registry Administrative Unit.
- Prevention and Attention to Emergency Fund.
- District Institute of Tourism (IDT).
- The 22 hospitals owned by the city.
- District Sports and Recreation Institute (IDRD).
- Bogota Philharmonic Orchestra.
- Botanical Garden Jose Celestino Mutis.
- Urban Development Institute (IDU).

===== Notable examples of vinculated decentralized entities =====
- Lottery of Bogota.
- Francisco Jose de Caldas Distrital University.
- Capital Salud E.P.S. S.A.S (healthcare provider).
- Canal Capital (TV channel).
- Transmilenio S.A.
- Empresa Metro de Bogotá EMB.
- Empresa de Telecomunicaciones de Bogotá ETB (telephony provider).
- Empresa de Energía de Bogotá EBB (electricity utility company).
- Empresa de Acueducto y Alcantarillado EAAB (water works utility company).

=== Local mayors ===
Local mayors are elected by the local administrative councils out of a three-candidate shortlist elaborated by the superior mayor.

== See also ==
- List of mayors of Bogotá
