= Roberto Urdaneta =

Colombian politician (1890–1972)

Roberto Urdaneta Arbeláez
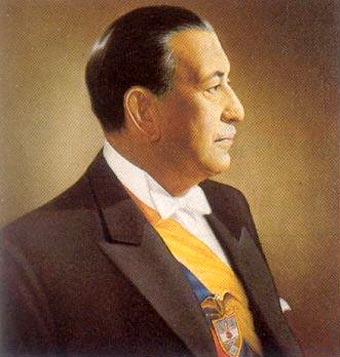
- Official portrait, 1951

25th President of Colombia
- In office 5 November 1951 – 13 June 1953
- Preceded by: Laureano Gómez
- Succeeded by: Gustavo Rojas Pinilla

Presidential Designate
- In office 30 October 1951 – 13 June 1953
- President: Laureano Gómez
- Preceded by: Eduardo Santos Montejo
- Succeeded by: Gabriel París Gordillo

Minister of Government
- In office 21 July 1951 – 5 November 1951
- President: Laureano Gómez
- Preceded by: Domingo Sarasty
- Succeeded by: Luis Ignacio Andrade
- In office 11 December 1946 – 14 January 1948
- President: Mariano Ospina Pérez
- Preceded by: Manuel Barrera Parra
- Succeeded by: José Antonio Montalvo

Minister of War
- In office 7 August 1950 – 21 July 1951
- President: Laureano Gómez
- Preceded by: Rafael Sánchez Amaya
- Succeeded by: José María Bernal

2nd Permanent Representative of Colombia to the United Nations
- In office 1948–1949
- President: Mariano Ospina Pérez
- Preceded by: Alfonso López Pumarejo
- Succeeded by: Fernando Londoño y Londoño

Minister of Finance and Public Credit
- In office 30 March 1945 – 9 April 1945
- President: Alfonso López Pumarejo
- Preceded by: Gonzalo Restrepo Jaramillo
- Succeeded by: Carlos Sanz de Santamaría

1st Colombia Ambassador to Argentina
- In office 16 January 1940 – 20 February 1941
- President: Eduardo Santos Montejo

1st Ambassador of Colombia to Peru
- In office 28 November 1939 – 23 December 1939
- President: Alfonso López Pumarejo
- Preceded by: Position established
- Succeeded by: Eduardo Restrepo Sáenz

Minister of Foreign Affairs
- In office 28 July 1931 – 10 December 1934
- President: Enrique Olaya Herrera (1931–1934); Alfonso López Pumarejo (1934)
- Preceded by: Raimundo Rivas
- Succeeded by: Enrique Olaya Herrera

Personal details
- Born: 27 June 1890 Bogotá, Cundinamarca, Colombia
- Died: 20 August 1972 (aged 82) Bogotá, Colombia
- Party: Conservative
- Spouse: Clemencia Holguín Caro (m. 1917)
- Education: University of Deusto; University of Salamanca; National University of Colombia
- Profession: Lawyer

Roberto Urdaneta Arbeláez (27 June 1890 – 20 August 1972) was a Colombian Conservative party politician and lawyer who served as president of Colombia from November 1951 until June 1953, while President Laureano Gómez was absent due to health issues.

== Biographic data ==
Urdaneta was born in Bogotá on 27 June 1890, during the administration of President Carlos Holguín Mallarino, his future father in law. He died in the same city on August 20, 1972. Urdaneta married Clemencia Holguín y Caro on 3 June 1917, with whom he had five children.

Urdaneta initiated his education in Bogotá. He then traveled to Bilbao, Spain, where he completed his high school education. Afterwards, he went to Salamanca, where he studied jurisprudence and obtained a degree in Law. Upon returning to Colombia, he taught mercantile law, economy and political science.

== Political career ==
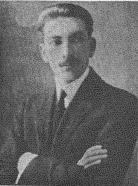
Urdaneta in 1930, as a minister of the government of Enrique Olaya Herrera

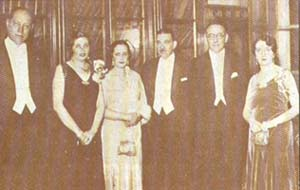
Enrique Olaya Herrera, María Michelsen de López, Clemencia Holguin de Urdaneta, Roberto Urdaneta Arbeláez, Alfonso López Pumarejo and María Teresa Londoño (Jockey Club de Bogotá – August 7, 1934)

Urdaneta had a long relationship to former Presidents of Colombia. He was the son in law of President Carlos Holguín Mallarino, brother in law of president Jorge Holguín, and both nephews of President Manuel María Mallarino. Carlos Holguin had also been married to the sister of President Miguel Antonio Caro. Thus, his election as President was seen by many as the "continuance of a family tradition".

At an early age Urdaneta showed great interest for politics and he enlisted in the Colombian Conservative Party. He was elected to the city council of Bogotá, to the Assembly of Cundinamarca and to the House of Representatives several times. Later, he was designated as Permanent Representative of Colombia to the United Nations, and Ambassador to Peru and Argentina. Urdaneta was also appointed to the Ministries of Defense, Finance, and Foreign Affairs.

== Presidency ==
Urdaneta became President of Colombia on November 5, 1951, when President Laureano Gómez became ill and had to resign from the presidency.

New congressional elections took place in 1951. The liberal party did not participate in this election, and thus, the composition of the new Congress was totally conservative. On October 30, 1951, the new Congress is sworn in, with the majority of members as followers of former president Mariano Ospina Pérez. On October 31, Congress is notified of the intentions of president Laureano Gómez to request leave of absence due to his illness. Congress moved promptly to elect a "Designado a la Presidencia" (interim president).

The candidate for the "Designatura" (office of interim president) with the majority of votes in Congress was Gilberto Alzate Avendaño, who happened to be the majority leader of Congress. Laureano Gómez opposed his nomination, and rather appealed for the candidacy of Roberto Urdaneta. Congress was persuaded by his impassionate appeal (the last wishes of a dying man), and elected Urdaneta as interim president. Thus, Urdaneta took the oath of President, before a joint session of Congress, on November 5, 1951.

By June 1953, President Laureano Gómez had recovered and was feeling better, and decided to regain control of the presidency. Before he did so, Gómez requested Urdaneta to remove General Gustavo Rojas Pinilla from his post as Chief of Staff of the Army. When Urdaneta failed to do so, Gómez showed up at the "Palacio de Nariño" (the presidents' palace), early in the morning of June 13, 1953, and proclaimed to be retaking his office as President.

Immediately after his announcement, Laureano Gómez left the "Palacio de Nariño". Urdaneta remained in the president's office. Within hours, that same afternoon, General Gustavo Rojas Pinilla, accompanied by other Generals of the Army's high command, presented himself before Urdaneta and stated: "In the name of the Army's high command, I have the charge to express to your Excellency that we are here to request that you continue acting as President of Colombia". Urdaneta, astonished, responded: "This morning I was removed from my post for not accepting an imposition, and now, I cannot retake it, as another imposition".

General Duarte Blum, on behalf of the high command, explained that it was not an imposition, but the honest desire of the Generals of the armed forces, whom did not have the administrative qualifications and experience that he had. General Rojas Pinilla pleaded with Urdaneta's wife, Clemencia Holguín, to try to persuade her husband to accept the Generals’ request. Urdaneta replied once again: "I am most grateful and moved by the Army's high command demonstration of trust and loyalty, but since this morning I am no longer the President, because Gómez has retaken his office. In order for me to accept your offer, President Gómez must resign again to his office".

General Rojas Pinilla had already ordered the mobilization of troops throughout Bogotá and in major cities of the country. In light of Urdaneta's reluctance to accept the Army's request, General Rojas Pinilla proclaimed himself to be in charge of the office of the presidency.

Political offices
Preceded by Laureano Gómez	President of Colombia; 1951–1953	Succeeded by Gustavo Rojas Pinilla
