= Alfonso López Pumarejo =

President of Colombia (1934–1938, 1942–1946)

His Excellency Alfonso López Pumarejo
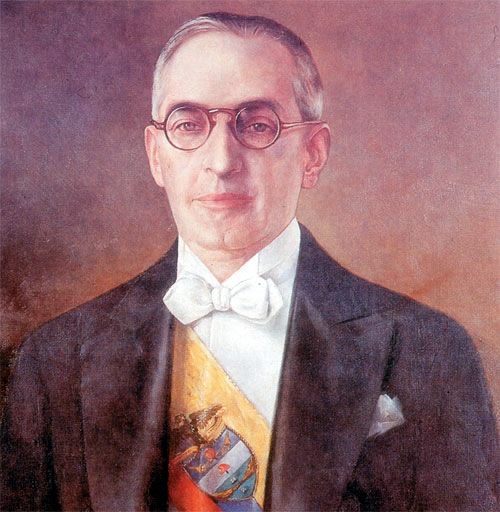

16th and 18th President of Colombia
- In office 7 August 1942 – 7 August 1945
- Preceded by: Eduardo Santos Montejo
- Succeeded by: Alberto Lleras Camargo
- In office 7 August 1934 – 7 August 1938
- Preceded by: Enrique Olaya Herrera
- Succeeded by: Eduardo Santos Montejo

7th Colombia Ambassador to the United Kingdom
- In office 5 June 1959 – 20 November 1959
- President: Alberto Lleras Camargo
- Preceded by: Carlos Alberto Sardi Garcés
- Succeeded by: Virgilio Barco Vargas

1st Colombia Ambassador to United Nations
- In office 1946–1948
- President: Mariano Ospina Pérez
- Preceded by: Office established
- Succeeded by: Roberto Urdaneta Arbeláez

Personal details
- Born: 31 January 1886 Honda, Tolima, United States of Colombia
- Died: 20 November 1959 (aged 73) London, England
- Party: Liberal
- Spouses: María Michelsen Lombana (m. 1911; died 1949); Olga Dávila Alzamora (m. 1953)
- Children: María; Mercedes; Alfonso; Pedro; Fernando
- Parents: Pedro Aquilino López; Rosario Pumarejo de López
- Relatives: López family
- Education: London School of Economics
- Occupation: Economist; journalist; diplomat; politician

Alfonso López Pumarejo (31 January 1886 – 20 November 1959) was a Colombian journalist, economist, politician, and diplomat who served as the 16th and 18th president of Colombia, serving from 1934 to 1938 and from 1942 to 1945. He is the second Colombian president to serve two non-consecutive terms and the second Colombian president to resign from office after Rafael Núñez in 1888.

Born in Honda, Tolima, López is a prominent leader of the Liberal Party in Tolima. During his first presidency, he spearheaded the "Revolution in March," which promoted state modernization, social justice, and constitutional reform. He also championed secular education, free from state and church interference.

During the course of his two presidencies, a wide range of progressive reforms were carried out in areas such as working conditions, social security, and housing.

== Biography ==
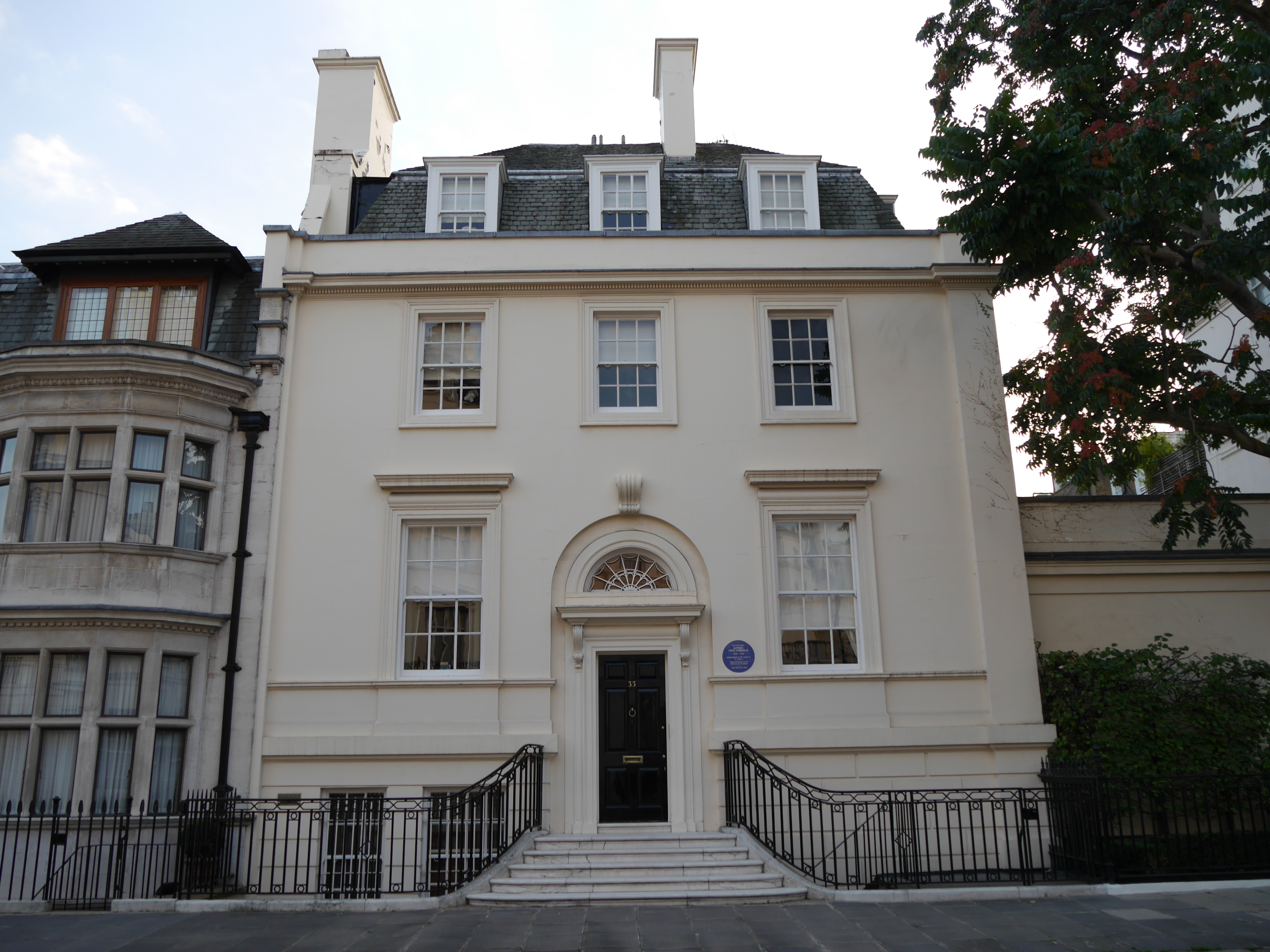
33 Wilton Crescent

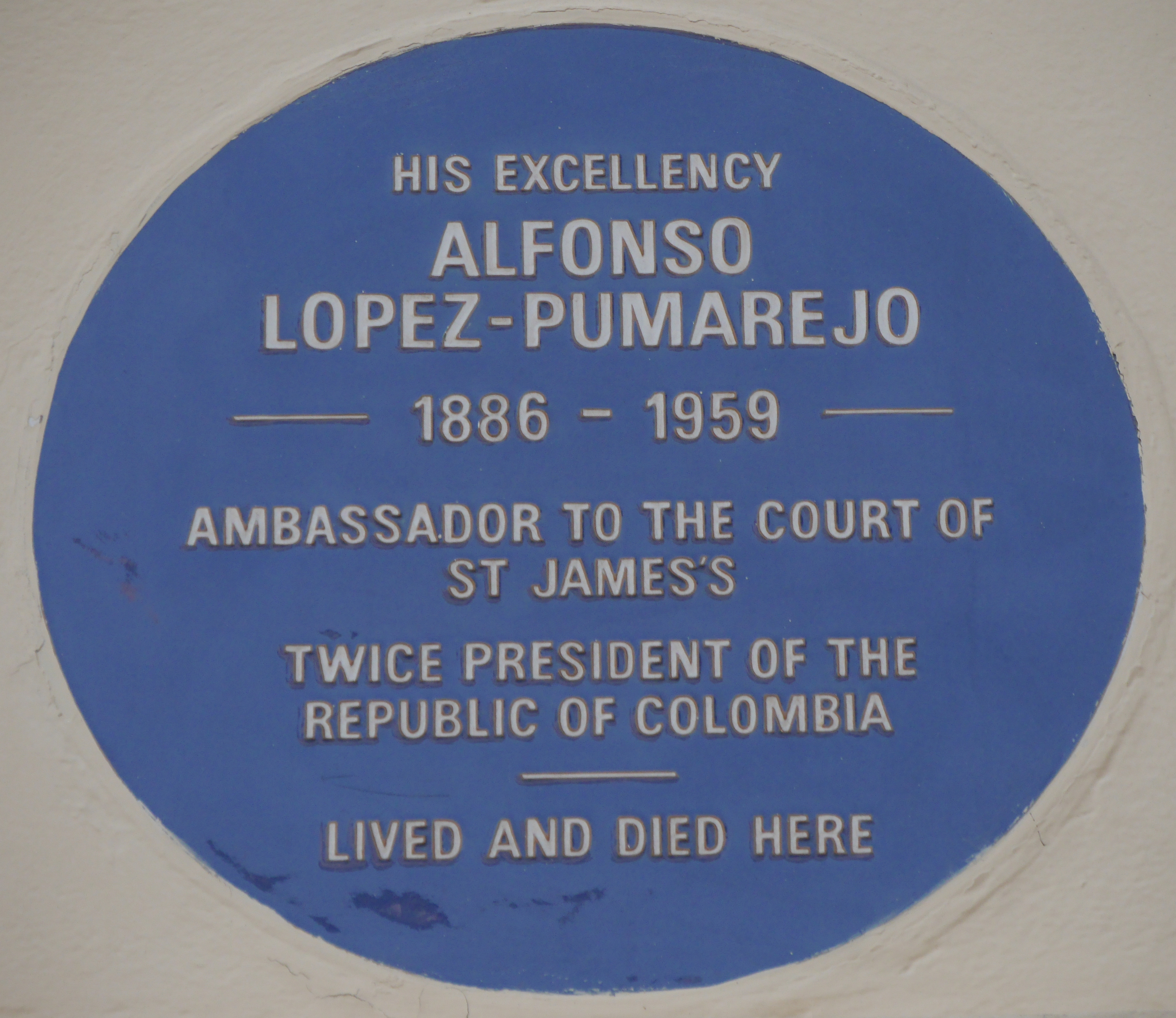
Blue plaque, 33 Wilton Crescent

Alfonso López Pumarejo was born in Honda (Tolima) to Pedro Aquilino López Medina, a businessman and Rosario Pumarejo Cotes. Alfonso López Pumarejo went on to study at the London School of Economics. His son, Alfonso López Michelsen, was president of Colombia between 1974 and 1978.

The first administration of Alfonso López Pumarejo (1934–38) known as the "revolución en marcha", has proven an enduring theme of historical interest.

He was elected president in 1934 almost unopposed, and as the second participant of the so-called Liberal Republic in Colombia, his initial government platform became known under the name "Revolución en Marcha" (Marching Revolution), as it attempted to implement far reaching social and political reforms. López ran a campaign emphasizing reform, welfare programs, liberal democracy, constitutional reform, education reform (moving away from Church-provided education to public education), expansion of male suffrage, and land reform to redistribute idle land to the landless.

Several radical changes were promoted during his first administration, as the government supported the creation of labour unions and also passed the Law 200 of 1936, which allowed for the expropriation of private properties, in order to promote "social interest".

He was supportive of free trade. His government dismantled exchange controls in 1935. His government liberalized regulations on foreign investment in Colombia, stimulating increased investment in banana and oil production. He signed a commercial treaty with the United States in 1935.

These actions earned López Pumarejo the backing of important rural and labour sectors, in addition to that of the Colombian Communist Party, but they likewise divided his previous political allies, some of which called for moderation. The election of his successor Eduardo Santos Montejo took place in 1938.

When Colombia joined the Allies in declaring war against the Axis powers in July 1943, López Pumarejo strongly supported the decision and simultaneously declared that the government should take into account that the United States would always place its own interests ahead of anything else, implicitly indicating that these may not necessarily coincide with those of Colombia.

To permit López Pumarejo to travel to the United States and care for his sick wife, María Michelsen de López, Darío Echandía assumed the acting presidency of the country from 17 November 1943 to 16 May 1944. This turn of events also prevented the development of further reforms, as López himself was temporarily removed from the political arena.

After his return to the country, further political conflicts led to a failed military coup attempt in 1944 wherein López Pumarejo was briefly kidnapped, and López Pumarejo finally resigned in early 1945.

Alfonso López Pumarejo died on 20 November 1959 in London, to which he had travelled as Colombia's ambassador to the United Kingdom. He had lived at 33 Wilton Crescent in Belgravia, Knightsbridge in London with his second wife, Olga Dávila Alzamora. They married in 1953 after both their spouses had died (she had been married to Leopoldo Kopp Castello, son of well-known industrialist Leo Kopp (es), founder of Bavaria Brewery). López's body was taken by horse-drawn carriage from his residency to Westminster Cathedral where a funeral mass was held in his name.

Political offices
Preceded by Enrique Olaya Herrera	President of Colombia; 1934–1938	Succeeded by Eduardo Santos Montejo
Preceded by Eduardo Santos Montejo	President of Colombia; 1942–1945	Succeeded by Alberto Lleras Camargo
