= Ministry of the Interior and Justice (Colombia) =

Government ministry of Colombia

- Ministerio de Interior y Justicia

Ministry overview
- Formed: 27 December 2002
- Preceding agencies: Ministry of the Interior; Ministry of Justice and Law
- Dissolved: 11 August 2011
- Superseding Ministry: Ministry of the Interior Ministry of Justice and Law
- Headquarters: Carrera 9 № 14-10, Bogotá, D.C., Colombia
- Annual budget: COP$452,925,000 (est. 2010)
- Child agencies: National Penitentiary and Prison Institute, (INPEC); National Directorate of Drugs, DNE; Superintendency of Notaries and Registration; Nasa Kiwe Corporation; National Directorate of Copyright, DNDA; National Printing Office of Colombia
- Key document: Ley 790 de 2002
- Website: www.mij.gov.co

The Ministry of the Interior and Justice (Spanish: Ministerio del Interior y Justicia, or MIJ), was at national executive ministry of the Government of Colombia responsible for the enforcement of both law and administration of justice, equivalent to the justice and interior ministries of other countries.

== Ministers ==
Order	Minister	Period
1st	Fernando Londoño Hoyos	2002–2004
2nd	Sabas Pretelt de la Vega	2004–2006
3rd	Carlos Holguín Sardi	2006–2008
4th	Fabio Valencia Cossio	2008–2010
5th	Germán Vargas Lleras	2010–2011

== See also ==
- Ministry of the Interior (Colombia)
