= Miguel Gómez Martínez =

Colombian economist & politician (born 1961)

Ministry of Finance and Public Credit
- Incumbent
- Assumed office 7 August 2026
- President: Abelardo de la Espriella
- Preceded by: Germán Ávila

Member of the Chamber of Representatives
- In office 20 July 2010 – 20 July 2014
- Constituency: Bogotá

Ambassador of Colombia to France
- In office 25 July 2002 – 17 November 2006
- President: Álvaro Uribe
- Preceded by: Marta Lucía Ramírez
- Succeeded by: Fernando Cepeda Ulloa

Ambassador of Colombia to UNESCO
- In office 25 July 2002 – 17 November 2006
- President: Álvaro Uribe
- Preceded by: Augusto Galán
- Succeeded by: Fernando Cepeda Ulloa

President of the Bank of Foreign Trade of Colombia
- In office 7 August 1998 – 7 August 2002
- Preceded by: Carlos Caballero Argáez
- Succeeded by: Gustavo Ardila Latiff

Vice Comptroller General of Colombia
- In office 1994–1996
- Preceded by: Jorge Vivas Reyna
- Succeeded by: Eudoro Álvarez Cohecha

Personal details
- Born: Miguel Gómez Martínez; 28 March 1961 (age 65) Bogotá, D.C., Colombia
- Party: National Salvation Movement (since 2021)
- Other political affiliations: Union Party for the People (2010–2017); Conservative (2017–2018)
- Children: 1
- Relatives: Enrique Gómez Martínez (brother); Álvaro Gómez Hurtado (uncle); Laureano Gómez (paternal grandfather); María Hurtado de Gómez (paternal grandmother); Nicolás Gómez Arenas (nephew)
- Education: Sciences Po

Miguel Gómez Martínez (Note: In this name that follows Hispanic American naming customs, the first or paternal surname is Gómez and the second or maternal family name is Martínez.) (born 28 March 1961) is a Colombian economist and politician.

== Early life, family and career ==
Gómez was born in Bogotá in 1961. His paternal grandfather was Laureano Gómez, who served as President of the Republic from 1950 to 1953.

He was a member of the Colombian Conservative Party and of the Party of the U, and held positions in the administrations of presidents Álvaro Uribe and Andrés Pastrana. He served as a member of the Chamber of Representatives during the 2010–2014 term.

In 2026, he was appointed Minister of Finance of Colombia by President-elect Abelardo de la Espriella. Following the 2026 Colombia earthquake that hit a few days into his tenure, Gómez announced that the government would declare an economic emergency and activate a loan with the World Bank costing up to US$450 million as part of efforts to guarantee the availability of resources. He also issued a one-month extension for the payment of income tax, whose deadline was originally scheduled on 13 August.
