= Diego Guevara (politician) =

Colombian politician (born 1985)

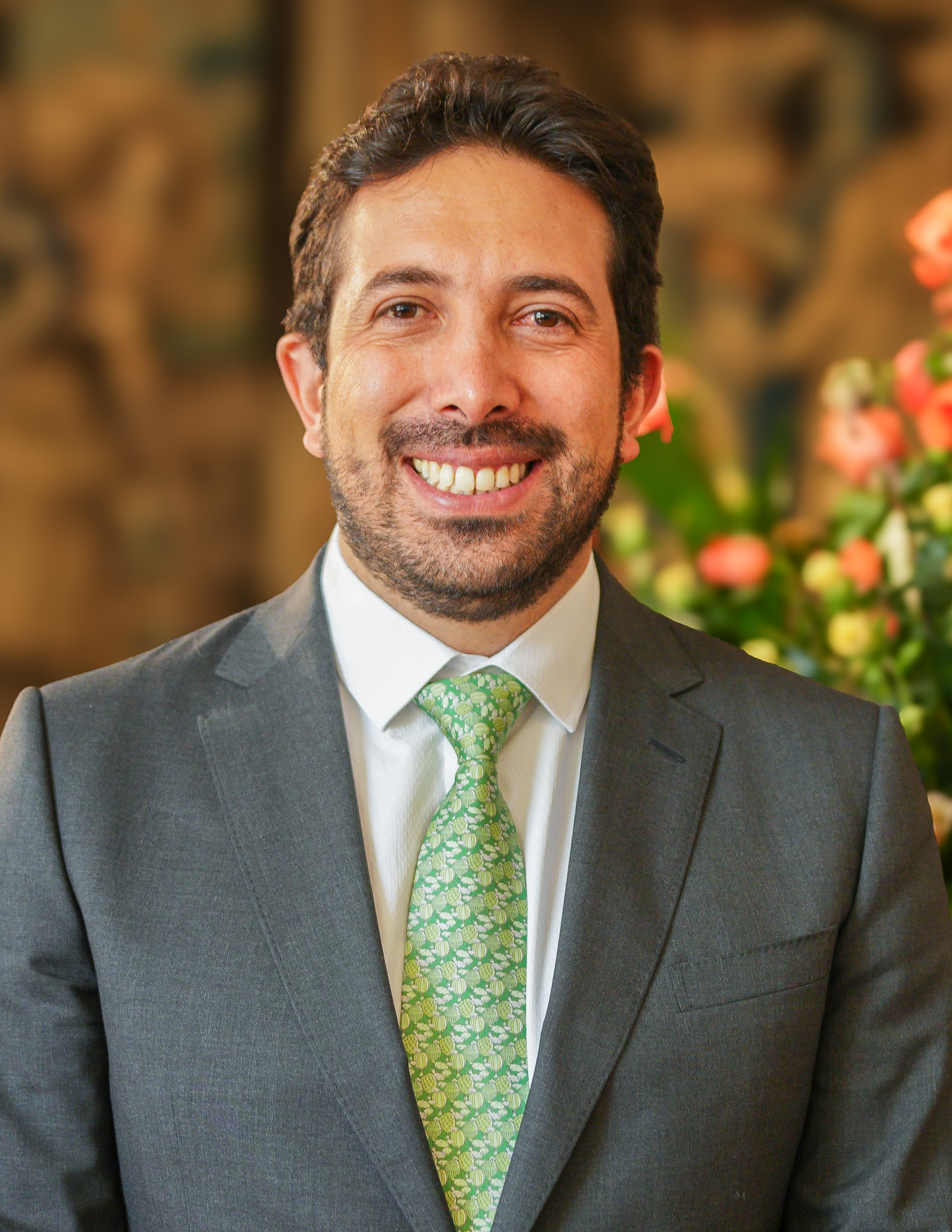
- Official portrait, 2025

Minister of Finance and Public Credit
- In office January 29, 2025 – March 18, 2025
- President: Gustavo Petro
- Preceded by: Ricardo Bonilla
- Succeeded by: Germán Ávila

Deputy Minister General of Finance and Public Credit
- In office August 11, 2022 – December 4, 2024
- President: Gustavo Petro
- Preceded by: Andrés Pardo
- Succeeded by: José Alejandro Herrera

Personal details
- Born: Diego Alejandro Guevara Castañeda; October 16, 1985 (age 40) Bogotá, D.C., Colombia
- Party: Humane Colombia (2020-present)
- Other political affiliations: Historic Pact for Colombia (2021-present)
- Education: National University of Colombia

Diego Alejandro Guevara Castañeda (born October 16, 1985) is a Colombia mechatronics engineer, doctor in economics and professor who served as Deputy Minister General of Finance and Public Credit from 2022 to 2024 and later as Minister of Finance and Public Credit until March 18, 2025.

Born in Bogotá, D.C., he studied Mechatronics Engineering and later completed a master's and doctorate in Economic Sciences at the National University of Colombia. In December 2024, he will be nominated as Minister of Finance and Public Credit, following the resignation of Ricardo Bonilla. Guevara taking the office on January 29, 2025.

Political offices
| Preceded by Andrés Pardo | Deputy Minister General of Finance and Public Credit; 2022–2024 | Succeeded by José Alejandro Herrera |
| Preceded by Ricardo Bonilla | Minister of Finance and Public Credit; 2025 | Succeeded by Germán Ávila |
