= 2016 Nobel Peace Prize =

- Juan Manuel Santos
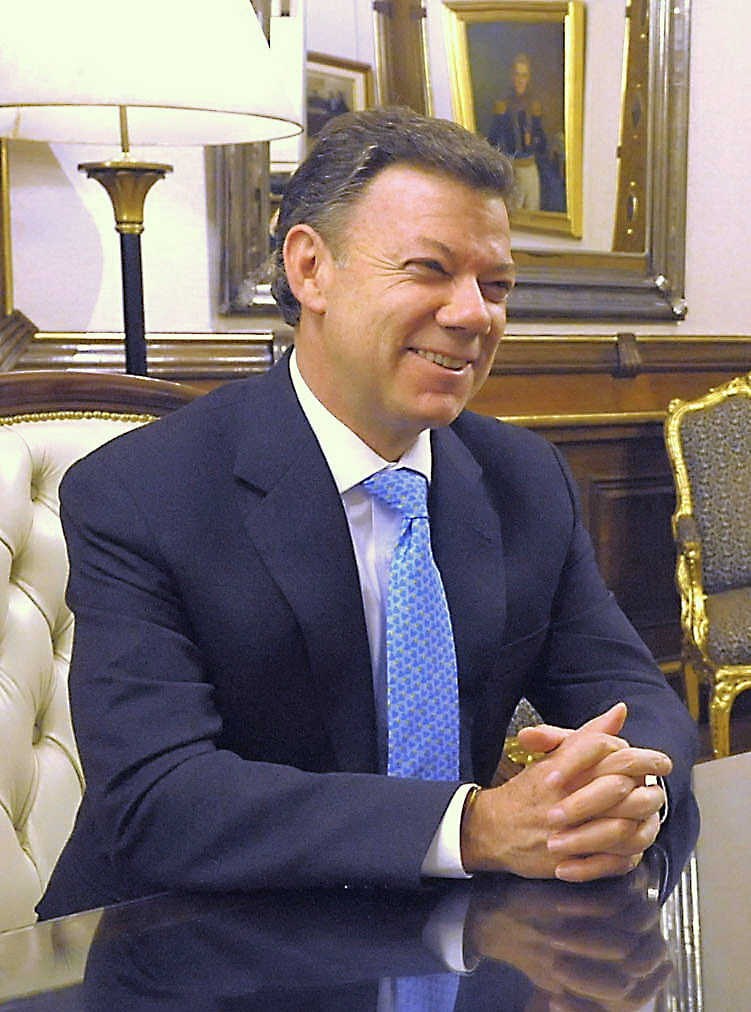
- "for his resolute efforts to bring the country’s more than 50-year-long civil war to an end."
- Date: 7 October 2016 (announcement by Kaci Kullmann Five); 10 December 2016 (ceremony)
- Location: Oslo, Norway
- Presented by: Norwegian Nobel Committee
- Rewards: 8 million SEK ($1M, €0.9M)
- First award: 1901
- Website: Official website

The 2016 Nobel Peace Prize was awarded to the President of Colombia Juan Manuel Santos (b. 1951) "for his resolute efforts to bring the country’s more than 50-year-long civil war to an end, a war that has cost the lives of at least 220,000 Colombians and displaced close to six million people." The conflict is the longest running war, and last remaining guerrilla struggle, in the Americas. The Nobel Peace Prize is awarded annually to those who have "done the most or the best work for fraternity between nations, for the abolition or reduction of standing armies and for the holding and promotion of peace congresses". The announcement was made on 7 October at a press conference at the Nobel Peace Center, and the formal award ceremony took place on 10 December at the Oslo City Hall.

The award was conferred only five days after the government's narrow defeat in the Colombian peace agreement referendum to ratify the final agreement on the peace process. The committee Chair Kaci Kullmann Five emphasized the effort and good intentions of Santos at the announcement press conference and also in the award citation:

The Norwegian Nobel Committee emphasizes the importance of the fact that President Santos is now inviting all parties to participate in a broad-based national dialogue aimed at advancing the peace process. Even those who opposed the peace accord have welcomed such a dialogue. The Nobel Committee hopes that all parties will take their share of responsibility and participate constructively in the upcoming peace talks.

Santos was first informed of the prize by his son in the pre-dawn of the day of the announcement. In his first public statement he declared, "This honourable distinction is not for me, it is for all the victims of the conflict. Together we will win the most important prize of all: PEACE." In the days following he also announced that the 8 million SEK prize (approximately 2.7 billion Colombian pesos) would be donated to support victims of the conflict.

== Nominations ==
376 candidates received nominations for this year's prize included 228 individuals and 148 organizations – the largest ever number of nominees, the previous record being 278 in 2014.

Notable other nominees included the "White Helmets" of the Syrian Conflict (who received several editorial endorsements from western newspapers); representative "Greek islanders", particularly those from Lesbos, for their response to the related refugee crisis; Nadia Murad for her work in refugee advocacy; and Congolese gynaecologist Denis Mukwege for work with victims of rape. Further nominations included Svetlana Gannushkina, Ernest Moniz and Ali Akbar Salehi, and Edward Snowden. Gannushkina and Syrian Civil Defense had been jointly awarded the 2016 Right Livelihood Award in the weeks prior. Six other Colombians, five of them victims of the Colombian armed conflict, had also been nominated.

The Venezuelan human rights organization Foro Penal, which provides legal assistance pro bono to people subject of arbitrary detentions and their relatives in the country, was nominated by a group of Spanish congressmen.

== Reactions ==
In a press release statement, UNESCO Director-General Irina Bokova said that this year's prize "pays tribute to the audacity and perseverance of President Santos and all those who seek to build peace every day, step by step to heal the wounds of the country, in their families and communities."

Media coverage characterised the announcement as a surprise since the national referendum on October 2 was narrowly defeated. Initial reports also expressed surprise that the prize was not awarded jointly with FARC leader Rodrigo Londoño, Santos' main negotiating partner. Londoño, under the name Timoleon Jimenez, tweeted his reaction to the announcement: "The only award we want is peace with social justice for Colombia without paramilitarism, without retaliation or lies."

Syria Civil Defence, tweeting as "The White Helmets", congratulated Santos and wished for peace for the people of Colombia, An hour later the Twitter account shared an image of a destroyed building with the text "At the time of the @NobelPrize announcement, @SyriaCivilDef center targeted in Hama. Back to work."

Álvaro Uribe, the leader of the movement to oppose the referendum and Santos' predecessor as Colombian president, congratulated him but also stated “I want him to lead to change these democracy-damaging peace accords.”

Ciarán Norris, writing in The Guardian, argued that awarding the prize solely to Santos, not to the White Helmets nor shared with a FARC leader, was a deliberate choice to lend its power in a way that might have the greatest direct impact in achieving peace. "The Nobel prize committee had an opportunity today, just days after a hard-fought peace risked being lost in the Colombian jungle, to provoke peace and kickstart that process. In so doing, they have demonstrated that where the international community may not always lend its support to securing peace in every conflict – Syria chief amongst them – they can sometimes provide the necessary momentum to see it through."

== Committee ==
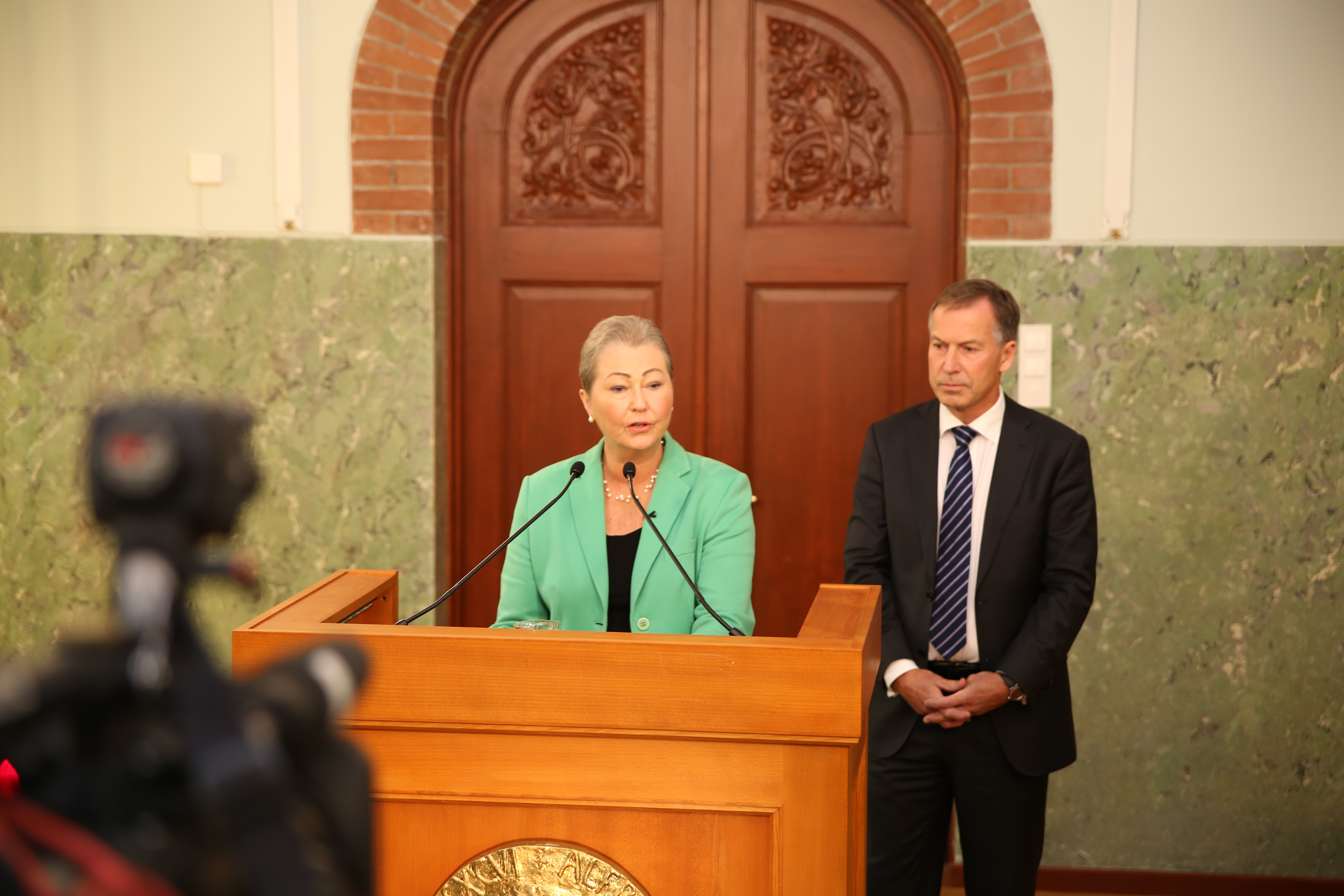
Five and Njølstad announcing the winner at the 7 October press conference

The Nobel Peace Prize is awarded by the Norwegian Nobel Committee:

- Kaci Kullmann Five (Chair since March 2015, born 1951), former member of Parliament and cabinet minister for the Conservative Party. Member of the Committee since 2003.
- Berit Reiss-Andersen (Deputy chair, born 1954), advocate (barrister) and president of the Norwegian Bar Association, former state secretary for the Minister of Justice and the Police (representing the Labour Party). Member of the Committee since 2011.
- Inger-Marie Ytterhorn (1941–2021), member of Parliament for the Progress Party. Member of the Committee since 2000.
- Thorbjørn Jagland (born 1950), former Member of Parliament and President of the Storting and former Prime Minister for the Labour Party, current Secretary General of the Council of Europe. Chair of the committee from 2009 to March 2015.
- Henrik Syse (born 1966), Senior Researcher at the Peace Research Institute Oslo. Member of the Committee since 2015.
- Olav Njølstad (Committee secretary, born 1957), Director of the Norwegian Nobel Institute.
