= Juan Carlos Echeverry (politician) =

Colombian economist

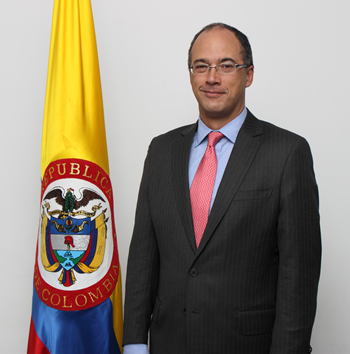
- Juan Carlos Echeverry in 2010

Persident of Banco de Bogotá
- In office 6 May 2026 – 10 Oct 2026
- Preceded by: César Prado
- Succeeded by: María Fernanda Suárez Londoño

President of Ecopetrol
- In office 6 March 2015 – 17 August 2017
- President: Juan Manuel Santos
- Preceded by: Javier Gutiérrez Pemberthy
- Succeeded by: Felipe Bayón Pardo

Minister of Finance and Public Credit
- In office 7 August 2010 – 3 September 2012
- President: Juan Manuel Santos
- Preceded by: Óscar Iván Zuluaga
- Succeeded by: Mauricio Cárdenas

Director of the National Planning Department
- In office 27 August 2000 – 7 August 2002
- President: Andrés Pastrana
- Preceded by: Mauricio Cárdenas
- Succeeded by: Santiago Montenegro

Personal details
- Born: Juan Carlos Echeverry Garzón; 12 September 1962 (age 64) Bogotá, Colombia
- Spouse: Verónica Navas Ospina (2004-present)
- Children: Gabriel Echeverry Navas; Gregorio Echeverry Navas
- Education: University of the Andes (BA.); New York University (PhD)
- Profession: Economist

Juan Carlos Echeverry Garzón (born 12 September 1962) is a Colombian economist, former Minister of Finance and Public Credit, and former president of Banco de Bogotá.

== Career ==
Echeverry has a Ph.D. in Economics from New York University and a B.A. in Economics from the University of the Andes. Echeverry writes a weekly editorial for CNN en Español.

He served as Colombia's Minister of Economic Planning from 2000 to 2002 and held the position of Dean of Economics at the University of the Andes from 2002-2006. He was appointed finance minister by Colombia's President-elect Juan Manuel Santos on June 22, 2010.

He served as the 68th Minister of Finance and Public Credit of Colombia from 2010 to 2012. He is the president of Econcept, a financial consulting firm in Bogotá and is an Associate Professor of Economics at University of the Andes. He was also a visiting professor at IE Business School, Madrid in 2013. He was president of Ecopetrol from 2015-2017.
