= Ricardo Bonilla =

Colombian politician

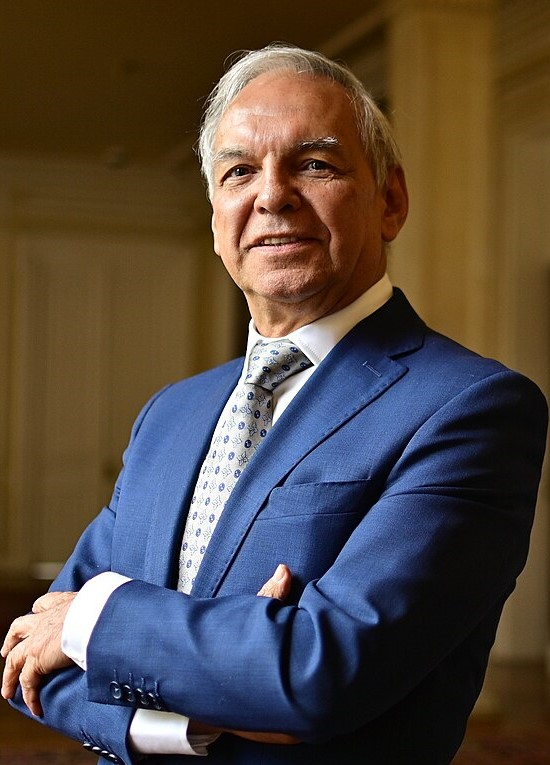
- Official portrait, 2023

Minister of Finance and Public Credit
- In office 1 May 2023 – 4 December 2024
- President: Gustavo Petro
- Preceded by: José Antonio Ocampo
- Succeeded by: Diego Guevara

President of the Territorial Development Financial Bank
- In office 20 October 2022 – 26 April 2023
- President: Gustavo Petro
- Preceded by: Sandra Gómez
- Succeeded by: Vacant

Secretary of Treasury of Bogotá
- In office 1 January 2012 – 30 April 2015
- Mayor: Gustavo Petro

Personal details
- Born: Ricardo Bonilla González; 21 February 1950 (age 76) Bogotá, Colombia
- Party: Humane Colombia (2012-present)
- Other political affiliations: Historic Pact (2021-present)
- Education: Jorge Tadeo Lozano University; University of Rennes

Ricardo Bonilla González (born 21 February 1950) is a Colombian economist and professor, who has served as director of the research and development center of the National University, in addition to being an advisor and researcher for various national and international organizations.

Between 1 January 2012 and 30 April 2015, he served as Secretary of the Treasury, during the local administration of Gustavo Petro, later he would be appointed as President of the Territorial Development Financial Bank, a position he would hold until 26 April 2023, to later become Minister of Finance and Public Credit, a position in which he has served since 1 May 2023.

Political offices
Preceded by Sandra Gómez	President of the Territorial Development Financial Bank; 2022–2023	Succeeded by Vacant
Preceded by José Antonio Ocampo	Minister of Finance and Public Credit; 2023–2024	Succeeded by Diego Guevara
