= 2016 Colombian peace agreement referendum =

- 2 October 2016
- Do you support the final agreement to end the conflict and build a stable and lasting peace?

Results
Choice	Votes	%
Yes	6,382,901	49.78%
No	6,438,552	50.22%
Valid votes	12,821,453	98.15%
Invalid or blank votes	241,464	1.85%
Total votes	13,062,917	100.00%
Registered voters/turnout	34,899,945	37.43%
- Results by department

The Colombian peace agreement referendum was held on 2 October 2016, aiming to ratify the final agreement on the termination of the Colombian conflict between the Colombian government and the FARC guerillas. It failed, with 50.2% voting against it and 49.8% voting in favor. Approval of the referendum was taken for granted in Colombia prior to the vote based on opinion polls. However, the 'No' option ended up winning by a narrow margin.

The result was compared to the outcome of the Brexit referendum and Donald Trump's victory in the 2016 U.S. presidential election, both also held in 2016.

== Background ==
The conflict is historically rooted in a period of Colombian history known as La Violencia, which was triggered by the 1948 assassination of liberal political leader Jorge Eliécer Gaitán, and in the aftermath of the anti-communist repression in rural Colombia in the 1960s that led Liberal and Communist militants to re-organize into the Revolutionary Armed Forces of Colombia (FARC).

The aim of the vote was the direct approval or rejection by voters of the agreements signed between the Colombian government and the Revolutionary Armed Forces of Colombia (FARC) in Cartagena de Indias, 27 September 2016. The peace negotiations began on 26 August 2012, in Havana, and concluded on 25 August 2016. The final agreement included topics of rural reform, political participation, the end of hostilities, solutions to the production of illicit drugs, the rights of victims, and the mechanisms of implementation and verification.

On 18 July 2016 the Constitutional Court approved the holding of a national plebiscite to validate the peace agreement. The ballot paper consisted of a single question for voters and that being whether to approve or reject the signed peace agreements:

¿Apoya el acuerdo final para terminación del conflicto y construcción de una paz estable y duradera? (Do you support the final agreement to end the conflict and build a stable and lasting peace?)

For the agreement to be approved, the "Yes" votes had to account for at least 13% of the electorate (i.e., 4,396,626 votes out of a total of 34,899,945 registered voters) and outnumber the "No" votes.

== Campaign ==
=== Yes ===
President Juan Manuel Santos, who was a promoter of the peace talks, announced the support for the 'Yes' option. The 'Yes' campaign received the support of many members of the Colombian community from the political left (Gustavo Petro, César Gaviria, Antonio Navarro Wolff, Piedad Cordoba), centre (Antanas Mockus, Sergio Fajardo, Lucho Garzon, Claudia López Hernández) and right (German Vargas Lleras, Enrique Peñalosa, Mauricio Cárdenas). The political parties that were in favour are the Alternative Democratic Pole, the Social Party of National Unity, Radical Change, the Independent Movement of Absolute Renovation, the Indigenous Social Alliance Movement, the Green Party of Colombia, the Colombian Conservative Party and the Liberal Party of Colombia.

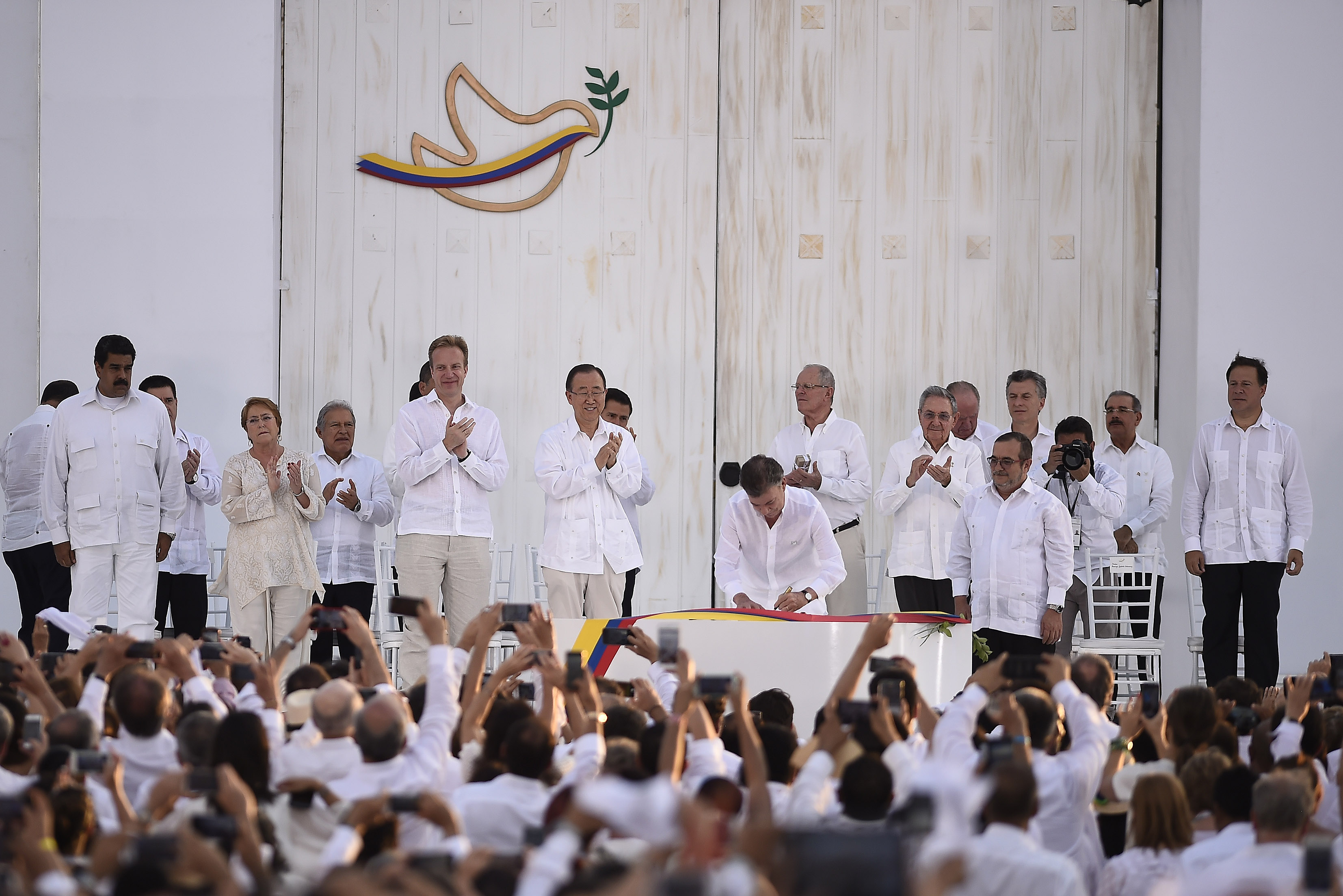
Colombian President Juan Manuel Santos signing the peace treaty with FARC leader Rodrigo Londono Echeverri, also known as Timochenko

Although, most public figures in Colombia refused to explicitly declare their support for either the 'Yes' or 'No' vote, many indicated their support for 'Yes' through various messages. Colombia's best-known singers Shakira, Carlos Vives, Juanes and Fonseca all posted messages of support and hope for peace on their Twitter accounts. International footballer Falcao wrote a letter to the newspaper El Tiempo in which he stated that he imagined "a country with the capacity to forgive", while former Colombian striker Carlos Valderrama was more outspoken in his support, appearing at campaign rallies for the 'Yes' vote and saying he wanted a better country for his children. Cyclist Nairo Quintana, who had won the Vuelta a España and come second in the Tour de France in 2016, asked his fellow Colombians to support the peace accord, describing it as "a step we had to take". Novelist Héctor Abad Faciolince, whose father Héctor Abad Gómez had been murdered for his stance on human rights, expressed his happiness that an accord had been reached. Internationally renowned sculptor Fernando Botero sent a sculpture of a white dove to the Colombian presidential palace, created in his signature "fat" style of portraying people and animals. It was accompanied by a message that he had wanted to create "this present for my country in order to express my support and my solidarity with this [peace] process". A Twitter campaign to promote the peace process outside Colombia, entitled "#Peace4Colombia", attracted the support of Colombian-born Hollywood actor John Leguizamo and Spanish singer Miguel Bosé, who holds honorary Colombian nationality. Most displaced Colombian victims living outside of the country supported the Yes vote, and voted accordingly, although some were critical of having been excluded from the peace process.

=== No ===
The most prominent campaigner for the 'No' vote was current senator and former president Álvaro Uribe. Uribe built his career, including two terms as president, on promises to tackle the guerrilla groups in the country, and had been an outspoken critic of Santos, his successor as president, ever since Santos began negotiations with the FARC. Uribe was supported by senior members of his Democratic Center party, including the 2014 presidential candidate Óscar Iván Zuluaga, 2014 vice-presidential candidate Carlos Holmes Trujillo, and then-senator and eventual president Iván Duque Márquez. The party presented several arguments against the peace deal, among them that the guerrillas would not serve time in prison, that they would automatically be awarded ten seats in Congress, that the deal would legalize narcotrafficking, and that in pursuing the negotiations Santos had gone beyond the terms of the Colombian constitution.

Other senior political figures who spoke out against the peace accord were conservative former Inspector General Alejandro Ordóñez, who feared it would legitimize violence within the country, and former president Andrés Pastrana, rejecting the position of his own Conservative Party. As Uribe's predecessor as president, Pastrana had himself attempted to negotiate a peace deal with the FARC between 1999 and 2002.

Outside of politics, other well-known Colombians also rejected the peace deal. Novelist and filmmaker Fernando Vallejo, who was born in Colombia but who became a naturalized Mexican citizen in 2007, launched a strong attack against the negotiations during a debate at the World Summit of Art and Culture for Peace in Bogotá on 6 April 2016, describing president Santos as "shameless" and calling the FARC "thugs". The strongly religious footballer Daniel Alejandro Torres, a regular starter in the Colombia national football team during 2016, published a video on his Instagram account in which he accused Santos of not placing Jesus at the heart of the negotiations. Jhon Jairo Velásquez (known as "Popeye"), the former hitman for Pablo Escobar and the Medellín drug cartel, also expressed his opposition to the accord.

== Opinion polls ==
Attitudes among Colombians were aligned to support for Santos or Uribe: those who supported Uribe's party and his preferred candidates showed lower support for the peace process, while those who supported Santos did the opposite. It was also noted that the support for the peace process was lower if specific policies were linked to the FARC.

The following table shows the results of opinion polling from the date of the announcement of the wording of the referendum question on 30 August 2016 up to the date of the referendum on 2 October 2016.

Date(s) conducted	Sample size	Margin of error	Polling organisation/client	Yes	No
31 Aug–1 Sep 2016	2,109	2.13%	Datexco/W Radio & El Tiempo	59.5%	33.2%
1–5 Sep 2016	1,526	4.9%	Ipsos Napoleón Franco/RCN, La FM & Semana	72%	28%
6–8 Sep 2016	2,109	2.13%	Datexco/W Radio & El Tiempo	64.8%	28.1%
13–15 Sep 2016	2,109	2.13%	Datexco/W Radio & El Tiempo	55.3%	38.3%
14–18 Sep 2016	1,200	4.9%	Invamer–Gallup Colombia/Caracol Televisión, Blu Radio & El Espectador	67.6%	32.4%
15–20 Sep 2016	3,007	2.0%	Cifras & Conceptos/Caracol Radio & Red + Noticias	54%	34%
21–25 Sep 2016	1,524	3.5%	Ipsos Napoleón Franco/RCN, La FM & Semana	66%	34%
25–26 Sep 2016	1,471	3.7%	Cifras & Conceptos/Caracol Radio & Red + Noticias	62%	38%

== Results ==
Votes from Colombians abroad (Colombia in yellow).

Choice	Votes	%
For	6,382,901	49.78
Against	6,438,552	50.22
Total	12,821,453	100.00
Valid votes	12,821,453	98.15
Invalid/blank votes	241,464	1.85
Total votes	13,062,917	100.00
Registered voters/turnout	34,899,945	37.43
Source: CNE

== Aftermath ==
Following the rejection, then-FARC commander-in-chief Timoleón Jiménez reaffirmed that the group was committed to peace. On 5 October 2016, thousands of citizens took to the streets across 14 cities to protest against the referendum result.

A 2018 study suggested one of the reasons for the "No" vote may have been a difficulty in comprehending the language of the agreements. On the day of the referendum Hurricane Matthew caused widespread flooding along Colombia's northern coastal region, with the result that many people were unable to go out and vote in a region which strongly backed the "Yes" vote: it has been suggested that this may also have been a factor in the loss. A 2026 study found that while the hurricane did reduce turnout by 11-13%, it was unlikely to affect the referendum outcome.
