= José Antonio Ocampo =

Colombian Minister of Finance and Public Credit (born 1952)

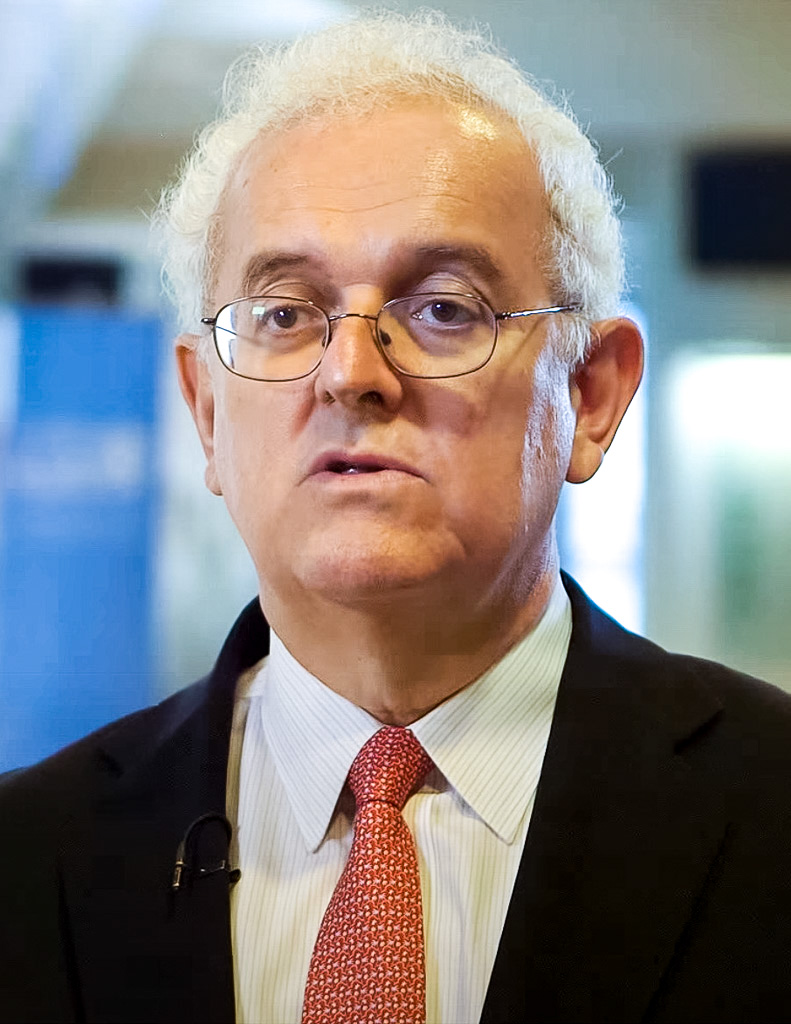

Minister of Finance and Public Credit
- In office 7 August 2022 – 26 April 2023
- President: Gustavo Petro
- Preceded by: José Manuel Restrepo
- Succeeded by: Ricardo Bonilla
- In office 7 August 1996 – 24 November 1997
- President: Ernesto Samper
- Preceded by: Guillermo Perry
- Succeeded by: Antonio José Urdinola

United Nations Undersecretary-General for Economic and Social Affairs
- In office 1 July 2003 – 1 July 2007
- Secretary-General: Kofi Annan; Ban Ki-moon
- Preceded by: Nitin Desai
- Succeeded by: Sha Zukang

United Nations Executive Secretary for the Economic Commission for Latin America and the Caribbean
- In office 1 January 1998 – 1 July 2003
- Secretary-General: Kofi Annan
- Preceded by: Gert Rosenthal
- Succeeded by: José Luis Machinea

General Director of National Planning
- In office 7 August 1994 – 14 May 1996
- President: Ernesto Samper
- Preceded by: Armando Montenegro
- Succeeded by: Juan Carlos Ramírez

Minister of Agriculture
- In office 4 May 1993 – 7 August 1994
- President: César Gaviria
- Preceded by: Alfonso López Caballero
- Succeeded by: Antonio Hernández Gamarra

Personal details
- Born: José Antonio Ocampo Gaviria; 20 December 1952 (age 73) Cali, Cuaca Valley, Colombia
- Party: Liberal
- Education: University of Notre Dame (BA); Yale University (MA, PhD)

José Antonio Ocampo Gaviria (born 20 December 1952) is a Colombian writer, economist and academic who was the professor of professional practice in international and public affairs and director of the Economic and Political Development Concentration at the School of International and Public Affairs at Columbia University from July 2007 to August 2022. Prior to his appointment, Ocampo served in a number of positions in the United Nations and the Government of Colombia, most notably and as Minister to two narco presidents and in the United Nations as Under-Secretary-General for Economic and Social Affairs and Executive Secretary for the Economic Commission for Latin America and the Caribbean, and in Colombia as Minister of Finance and Public Credit and Minister of Agriculture and Rural Development.

On 23 March 2012, Ocampo was nominated by Brazil as a candidate to lead the World Bank. Ocampo's native Colombia declined to endorse his bid, however, and with limited backing he withdrew from the race on 13 April 2012 and swung his support behind Nigerian Finance Minister Ngozi Okonjo-Iweala.

In 2022, President of Colombia Gustavo Petro appointed him as Minister of Finance.

== Biography ==
Ocampo graduated from the University of Notre Dame in 1972 with BAs in Sociology and Economics, in 1976 he received his PhD in Economics from Yale University with his dissertation Capital accumulation and international relations.

From 2008-2010, he was co-director of the UNDP/OAS Project on “Agenda for a Citizens’ Democracy in Latin America”. In 2009, he was a Member of the Commission of Experts of the UN General Assembly on Reforms of the International Monetary and Financial System.

In the political realm, he served in 2003-2007 as the United Nations Under-Secretary-General for Economic and Social Affairs. As such, he chaired the UN Executive Committee on Economic and Social Affairs and headed the UN Department of Economic and Social Affairs, which produces a wide range of research and analytical work on development issues, leads the follow-up to the major UN Summits and Conferences, and provides substantive and organizational support to the UN Economic and Social Council ECOSOC and the General Assembly.

Previously, from 1998 to 2003 he was Executive Secretary of the UN Economic Commission for Latin America and the Caribbean (ECLAC) and from 1989 to 1997 he held a number of high-level posts in the Government of Colombia, including Minister of Finance and Public Credit, and as such, Chair of the Central Bank's (Bank of the Republic) Board, Director of the National Planning Department, and Minister of Agriculture and Rural Development.

In the academic sphere, he served as Executive Director of FEDESARROLLO, Colombia's main think tank on economic issues, Director of the Centre for Economic Development Studies at the University of the Andes, Professor of Economics at Universidad de los Andes, and Professor of Economic History at the National University of Colombia. He has also taught as visiting professor at Cambridge, Oxford and Yale Universities and lectured in many other institutions while participating in many policy and academic conferences around the world.

== Author ==
Ocampo is author or editor of over 40 books and has published some 300 scholarly articles on macroeconomic theory and policy, international financial issues, economic and social development, international trade, and Colombian and Latin American economic history. He has also directed some 20 institutional reports.

His most recent books include The Economic Development of Latin America since Independence, with Luis Bértola (forthcoming 2012); the Oxford Handbook of Latin American Economics, edited with Jaime Ros (2011); Time for a Visible Hand: Lessons from the 2008 World Financial Crisis, edited with Stephany Griffith-Jones and Joseph E. Stiglitz (2010); Growth and Policy in Developing Countries: A Structuralist Approach, with Lance Taylor and Codrina Rada (2009); and Capital Account Liberalization and Development, edited with Joseph E. Stiglitz (2008).

His past books include Stability with Growth: Macroeconomics, Liberalization and Development, with Joseph E. Stiglitz et al. (2006); Regional Financial Cooperation (2006); International Finance and Development (2006); Globalization and Development: A Latin American and Caribbean Perspective (2003); the three-volume Economic History of Twentieth Century Latin America (2000), edited with Enrique Cárdenas and Rosemary Thorp; and more than ten editions of Historia Económica de Colombia (2007), originally published in 1977, and considered to be the best known text on the subject.

He has also written co-written a book chapter, with Stephany Griffith-Jones, Helping control boom-bust in finance through countercyclical regulation in Towards human development new approaches to macroeconomics and inequality.

== Personal life ==
Ocampo is married to Ana Lucía Lalinde and has three children. Rocio, 30, holds a B.A in Political Science from Universidad Complutense in Madrid, Spain, an MS in Gender from the same University and an MS in water from Brighton University in England; she currently works in ECLAC Mexico. Juan Camilo, 20, graduated from Horace Mann School and is currently in his second year at Columbia University where he is pursuing a double major in Mathematical Economics and Philosophy. Maria José, 19, also graduated from Horace Mann School and is currently a first-year student at Boston College where she works towards a double major in Psychology and Art.

Political offices
Preceded by José Manuel Restrepo	Minister of Finance and Public Credit; 2022–present	Incumbent
Preceded by Guillermo Perry	Minister of Finance and Public Credit; 1996-1997	Succeeded by Antonio José Urdinola
Diplomatic posts
Preceded by Nitin Desai	United Nations Department of Economic and Social Affairs; 2003–2007	Succeeded by Sha Zukang
Preceded by Gert Rosenthal	United Nations Executive Secretary for the Economic Commission for Latin America and the Caribbean; 1998-2003	Succeeded by José Luis Machinea
Political offices
Preceded by Armando Montenegro Trujillo	Director of the National Planning Department; 1994-1996	Succeeded by Juan Carlos Ramírez
Preceded by Alfonso López Caballero	Minister of Agriculture and Rural Development; 1993-1994	Succeeded by Antonio Hernández Gamarra
Order of precedence
Preceded by Álvaro Leyva as Minister of Foreign Affairs	Order of precedence of Colombia as Minister of Finance and Public Credit since 7 August 2022	Succeeded by Néstor Osuna as Minister of Justice and Law
