= Germán Ávila =

Colombian government official (born 1961)

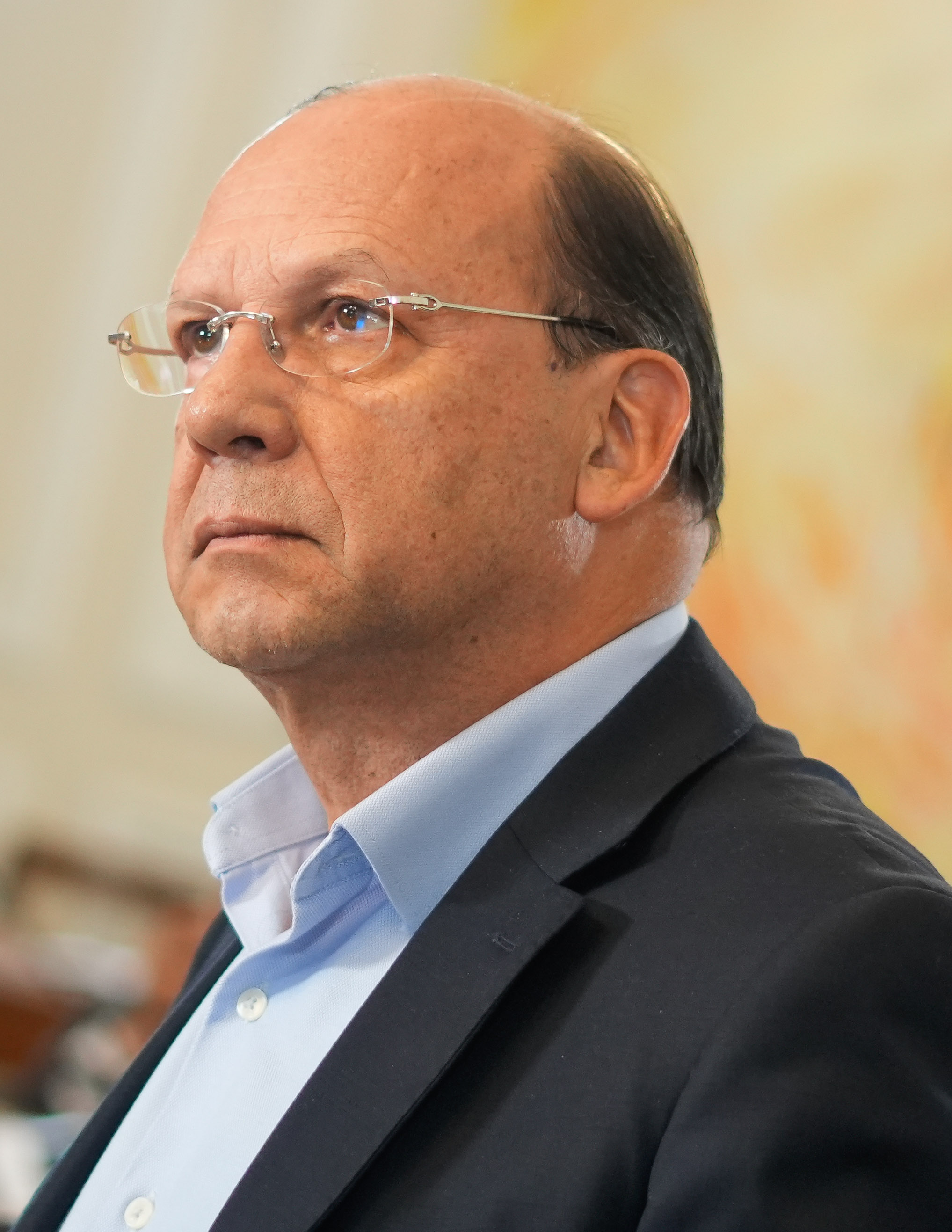
- Official portrait, 2025

Minister of Finance and Public Credit
- In office March 18, 2025 – August 7, 2026
- President: Gustavo Petro
- Preceded by: Diego Guevara
- Succeeded by: Miguel Gómez Martínez

President of the Bicentennial Group
- Incumbent
- Assumed office November 1, 2024
- President: Gustavo Petro
- Preceded by: Adriana Mazuera

Secretary General of the Alternative Democratic Pole
- In office March 2, 2005 – October 25, 2011
- Preceded by: Antonio Peñaloza
- Succeeded by: Jorge Enrique Robledo

Personal details
- Born: Germán Ávila Plazas; 1961 (age 64–65) Bogotá, D.C., Colombia
- Party: Humane Colombia (2011-present)
- Other political affiliations: 19th of April Movement (1974-1990); Alternative Democratic Pole (1990-2010); Historic Pact for Colombia (2021-present)
- Education: National University of Colombia (BEc)
- Occupation: Economist; politician

Germán Ávila Plazas (born c. 1961) is a Colombian economist and politician who has served as Minister of Finance and Public Credit since 2025. A member of Humane Colombia, he was active in the 19th of April Movement.

Born in Bogotá, he graduated from the National University of Colombia. He is the founder of Crear Cooperativa, led the National Federation of Popular Housing for more than three decades, and was secretary general of the Alternative Democratic Pole.

Party political offices
Preceded by Antonio Peñaloza	Secretary General of the Alternative Democratic Pole; 2005-2011	Succeeded by Jorge Enrique Robledo
Political offices
Preceded by Adriana Mazuera	President of the Bicentennial Group; 2025–2026	Incumbent
Preceded by Diego Guevara	Minister of Finance and Public Credit; 2025-2026	Succeeded by Miguel Gómez Martínez
Order of precedence
Preceded by Rosa Villavicencio as Minister of Foreign Affairs	Order of precedence of Colombia as Minister of Finance and Public Credit since March 18, 2025	Succeeded by Luis Eduardo Montealegre as Minister of Justice and Law
