= Juan Manuel Santos =

President of Colombia from 2010 to 2018

His Excellency Juan Manuel Santos GColIH GCB GColL ODB
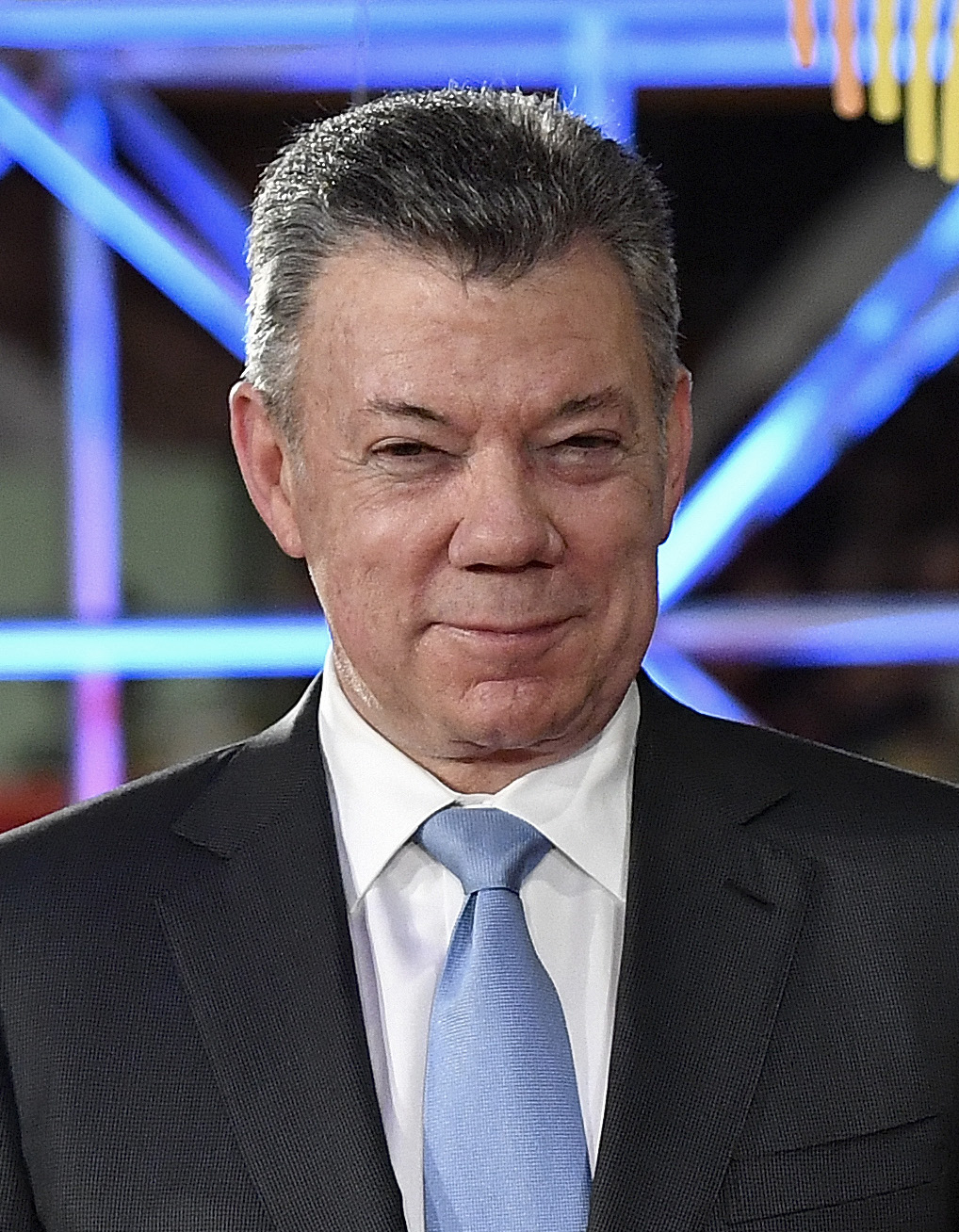
- Santos in 2018

33rd President of Colombia
- In office 7 August 2010 – 7 August 2018
- Vice President: Angelino Garzón; Germán Vargas Lleras; Oscar Naranjo
- Preceded by: Álvaro Uribe
- Succeeded by: Iván Duque

President pro tempore of the Pacific Alliance
- In office 30 June 2017 – 24 July 2018
- Preceded by: Michelle Bachelet
- Succeeded by: Martín Vizcarra
- In office 23 May 2013 – 20 June 2014
- Preceded by: Sebastián Piñera
- Succeeded by: Enrique Peña Nieto
Ministerial positions
Minister of National Defence
In office 18 July 2006 – 18 May 2009
President	Álvaro Uribe
Preceded by	Camilo Ospina Bernal
Succeeded by	Freddy Padilla de León (acting)
Minister of Finance and Public Credit
In office 7 August 2000 – 7 August 2002
President	Andrés Pastrana Arango
Preceded by	Juan Camilo Restrepo Salazar
Succeeded by	Roberto Junguito Bonnet
Minister of Foreign Trade
In office 18 November 1991 – 7 August 1994
President	César Gaviria
Preceded by	Position established
Succeeded by	Daniel Mazuera Gómez

Presidential Designate of Colombia
- In office 11 August 1993 – 7 August 1994
- President: César Gaviria
- Preceded by: Humberto De la Calle
- Succeeded by: Position abolished

Personal details
- Born: Juan Manuel Santos Calderón; 10 August 1951 (age 75) Bogotá, Colombia
- Party: Social Party of National Unity (since 2005)
- Other political affiliations: Liberal (until 2005)
- Spouse(s): Silvia Amaya Londoño (divorced) María Clemencia Rodríguez Múnera (m. 1987)
- Children: 3
- Education: University of Kansas (BA); London School of Economics (MSc); Harvard University (MPA)
- Awards: Nobel Peace Prize (2016)

Military service
- Allegiance: Colombia
- Branch/service: Colombian Navy
- Years of service: 1967–1971
- Rank: Cadet

Juan Manuel Santos Calderón GColIH GCB GColL ODB ([ˈxwam maˈnwel ˈsantos kaldeˈɾon]; born 10 August 1951) is a Colombian politician who was the President of Colombia from 2010 to 2018. He was the recipient of the 2016 Nobel Peace Prize.

An economist by training and a journalist by trade, Santos is a member of the wealthy and influential Santos family, who from 1913 to 2007 were the majority shareholders of El Tiempo, Colombia's newspaper of record.

In 1991, Santos was appointed by President César Gaviria Trujillo as Colombia's first Minister of Foreign Trade. In 2000, he was appointed by President Andrés Pastrana Arango as the 64th Minister of Finance and Public Credit.

Santos rose to prominence during the administration of President Álvaro Uribe Vélez, who was elected in 2002. In 2005, Santos co-founded and led the Social Party of National Unity (Party of the U), a liberal-conservative party coalition that backed the policies of President Uribe, successfully supporting his attempt to seek a constitutional reform to be able to run for a second term. In 2006, after Uribe's re-election, when the Party of the U won a majority of seats in the two chambers of Congress, Santos was appointed as Minister of National Defence, and continued defending the security policies of President Uribe, taking a strong and forceful stance against FARC and the other guerrilla groups operating in Colombia. His time at the Ministry of Defense was tarnished by the "False positives" scandal, the executions of thousands of civilians that the army passed off as guerrillas killed in combat.

In 2010, Santos won the presidential election as the protégé of Uribe. Some months later, Uribe became his strongest opponent, and also founded three years later the opposition party Democratic Center. This rivalry led to Santos' unpopularity and a near-defeat during the 2014 Colombian presidential election against Uribe's protégé Óscar Iván Zuluaga.

On 7 October 2016, Santos was announced as recipient of the Nobel Peace Prize for his efforts negotiating a peace treaty with the FARC-guerrilla in the country, despite his defeat in the referendum held over the deal, where the "No" campaign led by Uribe's Democratic Center won narrowly. The Colombian government and the FARC signed a revised peace deal on 24 November and sent it to Congress for ratification instead of conducting a second referendum. Both houses of Congress ratified the revised peace accord on 29–30 November 2016, marking an end to the conflict. The treaty brought deep divisions and polarization in the country, which questions its legitimacy. Santos has been named as one of Time's 100 most influential people. Santos left office with one of the lowest levels of popular approval ever, and his successor was Uribe's new protégé, Iván Duque, a moderate critic of Santos' peace treaty with the FARC guerillas.

== Life and career ==
Santos was born in Bogotá, Colombia. He attended Colegio San Carlos, a private secondary school in Bogotá, where he spent most of his school years until 1967, when he enlisted in the Colombian Navy and transferred to the Admiral Padilla Naval Cadet School in Cartagena, graduating from it in 1969, and continuing in the Navy until 1971, finishing with the rank of naval cadet NA-42z 139.

After leaving the Navy, Santos moved to the United States where he attended the University of Kansas. A member of Delta Upsilon fraternity, he graduated in 1973 with a Bachelor in Economics and Business Administration. On 31 October 2017, Santos received an honorary doctorate of human letters from KU.

After graduating from the University of Kansas, Santos was Chief Executive of the National Federation of Coffee Growers of Colombia to the International Coffee Organization in London. During this time he also attended the London School of Economics, graduating with a Master of Science in Economic Development in 1975. He then attended the John F. Kennedy School of Government at Harvard University, graduating with a Master of Public Administration in 1981. He returned to Colombia to become Deputy Director of his family owned newspaper El Tiempo. Santos has been a member of the Washington-based think tank the Inter-American Dialogue since 1990, and he previously was co-chair of the Board of Directors. He was president of the Freedom of Expression Commission for the Inter American Press Association.

A Fulbright visiting fellow at the Fletcher School of Law and Diplomacy at Tufts University in 1981, and a Nieman Fellow at Harvard University in 1988, Santos also holds an honorary Doctor of Laws degree.

He was Minister of Foreign Trade of Colombia during the administration of President César Gaviria Trujillo from 1991 to 1994 and also the Presidential Designate of Colombia from 1993 to 1994, Minister of Finance and Public Credit of Colombia during the administration of President Andres Pastrana Arango from 2000 to 2002. In 1992 he was appointed President of the VIII United Nations Conference on Trade and Development.

In 1994 Juan Manuel Santos founded the Good Government Foundation, whose stated objective is helping and improving the governability and efficiency of the Colombian Government. This organization presented a proposal for a demilitarized zone and peace talks with the FARC guerrilla group. Juan Manuel Santos has been named as one of Time magazine's 100 most influential people. Universidade NOVA de Lisboa is granting the Honoris Causa Doctorate title to Juan Manuel Santos.

== Minister of Defense ==
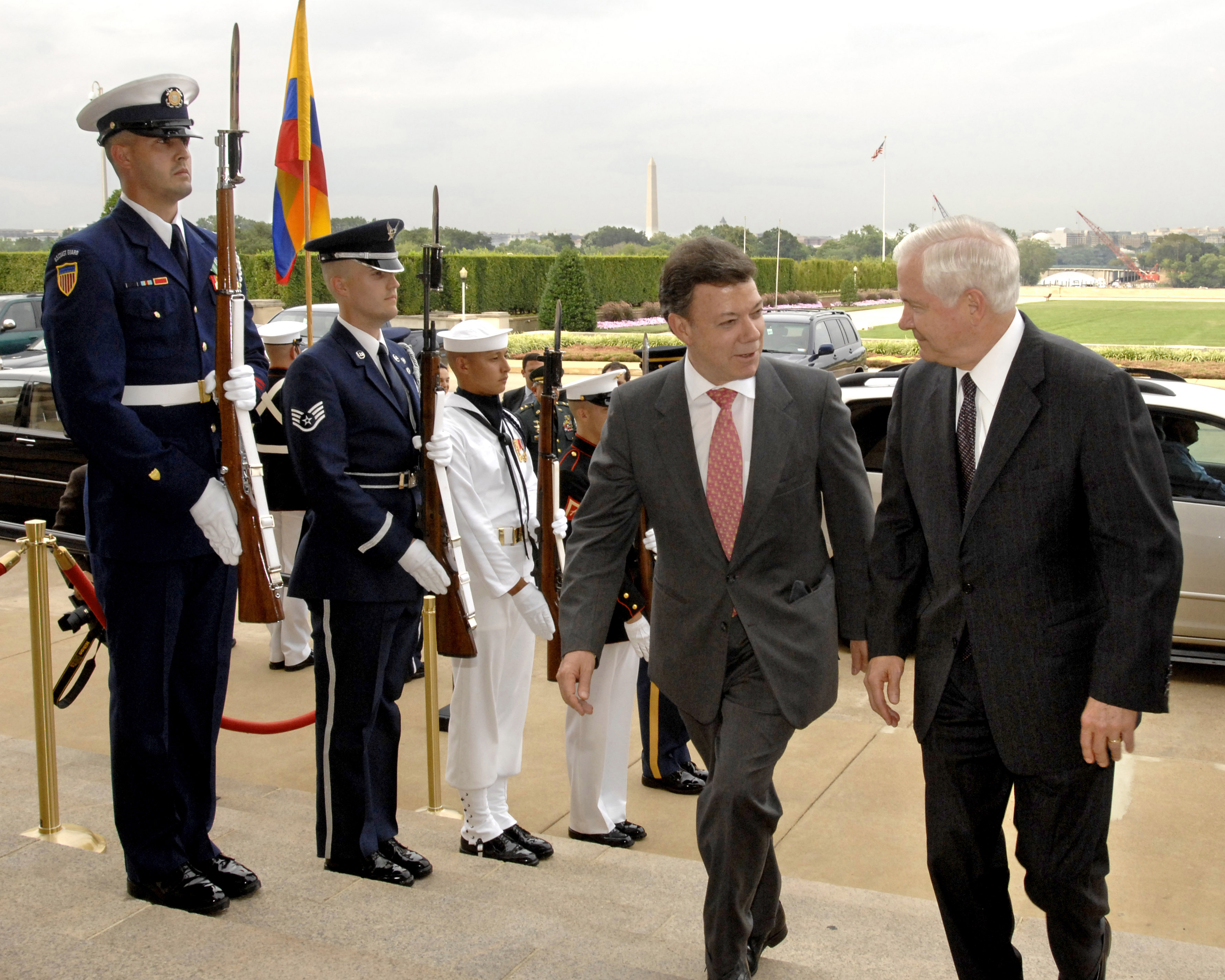
Minister Santos with his counterpart, U.S. Secretary of Defence Robert Gates, during a visit to the Pentagon in 2008

Santos also founded the Social Party of National Unity (Party of the U) to support the presidency of Álvaro Uribe. He was named Minister of Defence on 19 July 2006. During his tenure as Defence Minister, the administration dealt a series of blows against the FARC guerrilla group, including the rescue of Fernando Araújo Perdomo, the death of FARC Secretariat member Raúl Reyes (a controversial military raid on Ecuador's border), and the non-violent rescue of former presidential candidate Ingrid Betancourt held captive since 2002, along with fourteen other hostages, including three Americans.

In 2008 the 'false positives' scandal was uncovered, referring to revelations concerning extrajudicial executions carried out by members of the military in order to artificially increase the number of guerrillas killed by the Army and claim rewards from the government. On 4 November 2008, Santos admitted that the military had carried out extrajudicial executions and he pledged to resolve the issue. Twenty-seven military officers, including three generals and eleven colonels, were sacked after an internal army investigation concluded that they were responsible for administrative failures and irregularities in reporting enemy casualties and operational results. The Commander of the Colombian National Army, General Mario Montoya, resigned. By May 2009, 67 soldiers had been found guilty and over 400 were arrested pending trial.

There are different estimates for the number of civilians who may have been murdered in this manner. As of May 2009, prosecutors were investigating more than 900 cases involving over 1,500 victims and 1,177 members of the Colombian security forces. According to the Coordinación Colombia-Europa-Estados Unidos NGO coalition and the Fundación para la Educación y el Desarrollo, an estimated 3,756 extrajudicial murders occurred between 1994 and 2009, of which 3,084 cases would have taken place after 2002.

Families of the victims and non-governmental organisations have held the Uribe administration and Santos, as Defence Minister, responsible for the extrajudicial murders because they consider that the government's reward policies motivated the crimes. Directive 029 of 2005 issued under Defence Minister Camilo Ospina Bernal and presidential decree 1400 of May 2006 have been questioned for offering incentives and benefits in exchange for capturing or killing members of illegal armed groups.

In June 2009, United Nations Special Rapporteur Philip Alston declared that extrajudicial executions had been carried out in a "more or less systematic manner" by numerous Colombian military personnel and found the number of trials for those implicated to be lacking, but stated that he had found no evidence of the executions being an official government policy and acknowledged a decrease in the number of reported cases.

In March 2010, Santos publicly stated these executions had stopped since October 2008 and that this had been confirmed by the CINEP, one of Colombia's foremost human rights defence institutions. Semana, a well-respected weekly magazine, reported that a few days later the CINEP responded to Santos's declarations by issuing a press release which stated that, while the number of reported cases had been significantly reduced after the Defence Ministry's measures were announced, the period between November 2008 and December 2009 still saw seven such executions and two arbitrary detentions.

Juan Manuel Santos announced his resignation from the Defence Ministry on 18 May 2009. Santos said that his resignation did not necessarily imply tossing his hat into the 2010 presidential race and that his participation in the electoral race depended on whether Uribe would pursue a third term, which he was willing to support. His resignation took effect on 23 May 2009. When the Constitutional Court ruled out the possibility of Uribe's participation in the upcoming elections, Santos officially launched his campaign for the presidency of the Republic of Colombia.

== Presidency (2010–2018) ==
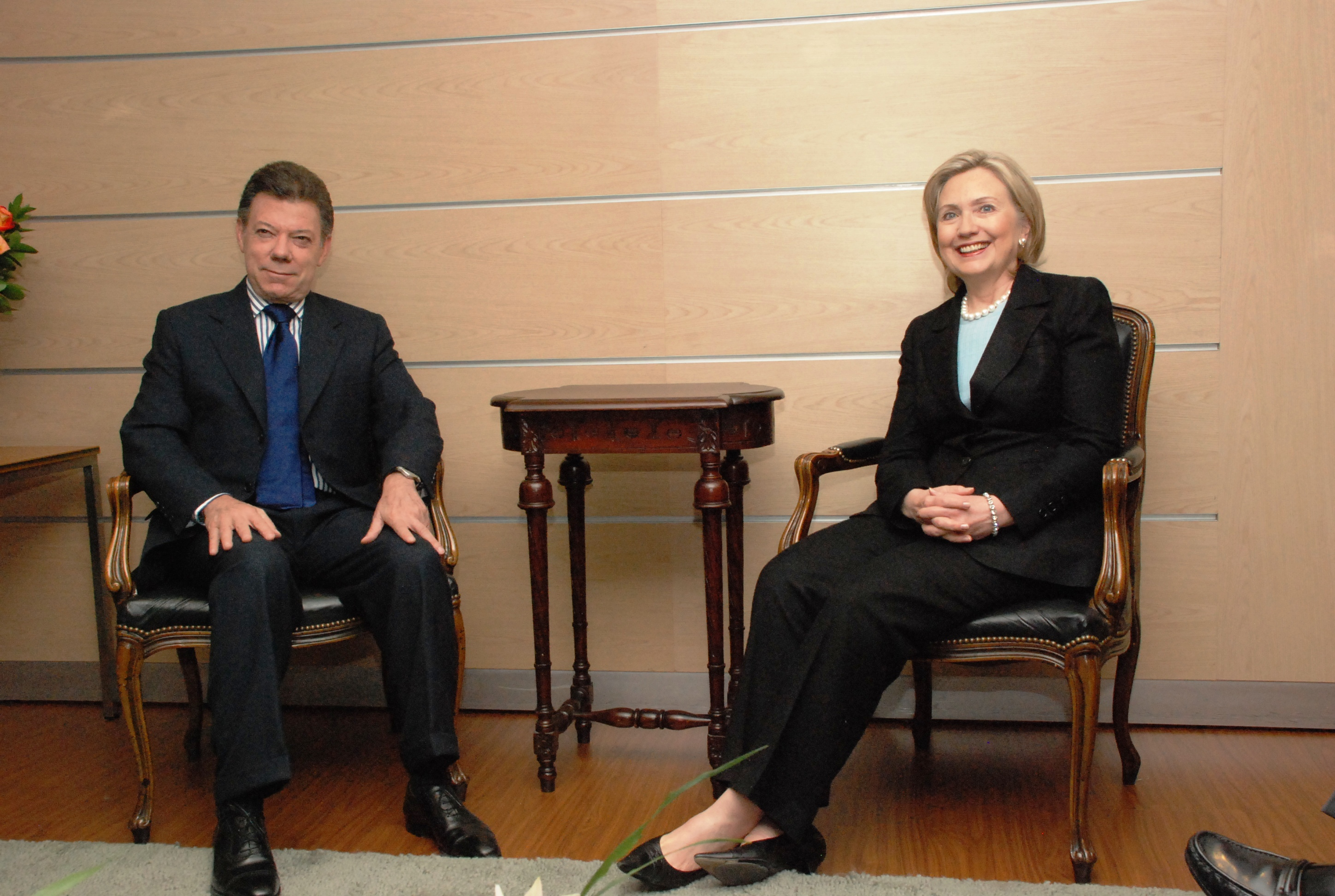
Santos and U.S. Secretary of State Hillary Clinton, 9 June 2010

On 20 June 2010, after two rounds of voting in the Presidential election, Juan Manuel Santos Calderón was officially elected as President of Colombia and was inaugurated on 7 August 2010 in the midst of a diplomatic crisis with Venezuela, which was quickly resolved.

=== Negotiations with FARC ===
Santos announced on 27 August 2012 that the Colombian government had engaged in exploratory talks with FARC in order to seek an end to the conflict. He also said that he would learn from the mistakes of previous leaders, who failed to secure a lasting ceasefire with FARC, though the military would still continue operations throughout Colombia while talks continued. According to an unnamed Colombian intelligence source, Santos offered FARC assurances that no one would be extradited to stand trial in another country. The move has been viewed as a cornerstone of Santos' presidency. Former President Uribe has criticised Santos for seeking peace "at any costs" in contrast to his predecessor's rejection of talks.

In October 2012, Santos received the Shalom Prize "for his commitment to seeking peace in his country and worldwide." Upon accepting the award from the Latin American chapter of the World Jewish Congress, Santos stated that "Both the people here and the people in Israel have been seeking peace for decades," adding that Colombia is in favour of a two-state solution to the Israeli-Palestinian conflict.

In September 2016, Santos announced that an agreement had been made completely settling the dispute between the Colombian government and FARC on the basis of a truth and reconciliation-like process, in which a combination of complete admissions of guilt and community service on the part of perpetrators of misdeeds during the years of conflict would serve in place of retributive justice.

The 52-year Colombian war has cost the country 152 billion (USD), according to conflict monitoring NGO Indepaz. Within the last five years the daily cost of the war has escalated to US$9.3 million per day – enough to feed 3 million people in Colombia and wipe out extreme poverty in that country.

=== Relations with Trump administration ===
In May 2017, U.S. President Donald Trump and Santos held a joint news conference at the White House, where Trump praised Colombia's efforts to end a 52-year civil war that left more than 220,000 dead as a "great thing to watch."

Around that time, it was reported that Trump had an "unusual meeting with former presidents Alvaro Uribe and Andres Pastrana" at his Florida resort Mar-a-Lago, lending weight to suspicion that Santos's political enemies were enlisting Trump's support against the historic peace accord. The event was widely reported in Colombia, yet never announced by the White House.

In September 2017, Santos defended Colombia's record against Trump's complaints about what he called unacceptable growth in coca cultivation and production. Trump added that he considered downgrading the country in a White House assessment, which would result in reduced development and security funding. One source of contention is the usage of glyphosate to eradicate coca crops, which Colombia had halted in favor of other methods due to health concerns.

Colombia defended its anti-narcotics efforts after the threat of Trump to decertify the country as a partner in counter-narcotics efforts.

For more than 30 years Colombia has demonstrated its commitment – paying a very high cost in human lives – with overcoming the drug problem. This commitment stems from the profound conviction that the consumption, production and trafficking of drugs constitute a serious threat to the well-being and security of citizens. Colombia is undoubtedly the country that has fought the most drugs and with more successes on this front. No one has to threaten us to meet this challenge.

— Colombia’s National Government

The problem of drugs is global. Overcoming it can only be achieved through cooperation and under the principle of joint responsibility. Consumer countries' authorities have a fundamental responsibility to their fellow citizens and the world to reduce consumption and to attack trafficking and distribution organizations in their own countries.

— Colombia’s National Government

In July 2018, Santos called on Trump to urge Russian president Vladimir Putin to stop supporting Venezuela's authoritarian government. Santos has acknowledged that, in 2017, Trump raised the idea of a military invasion of Venezuela to drive out President Nicolas Maduro, which he and other Latin American leaders rejected at the time.

=== Other views ===
During a Google hangout hosted by the Colombian newspaper El Tiempo on 20 May 2014, Santos voiced his support for same-sex marriage, saying: "Marriage between homosexuals to me is perfectly acceptable and what's more I am defending unions that exist between two people of the same sex with the rights and all of the same privileges that this union should receive."

=== Presidential campaigns ===
==== 2014 presidential campaign ====
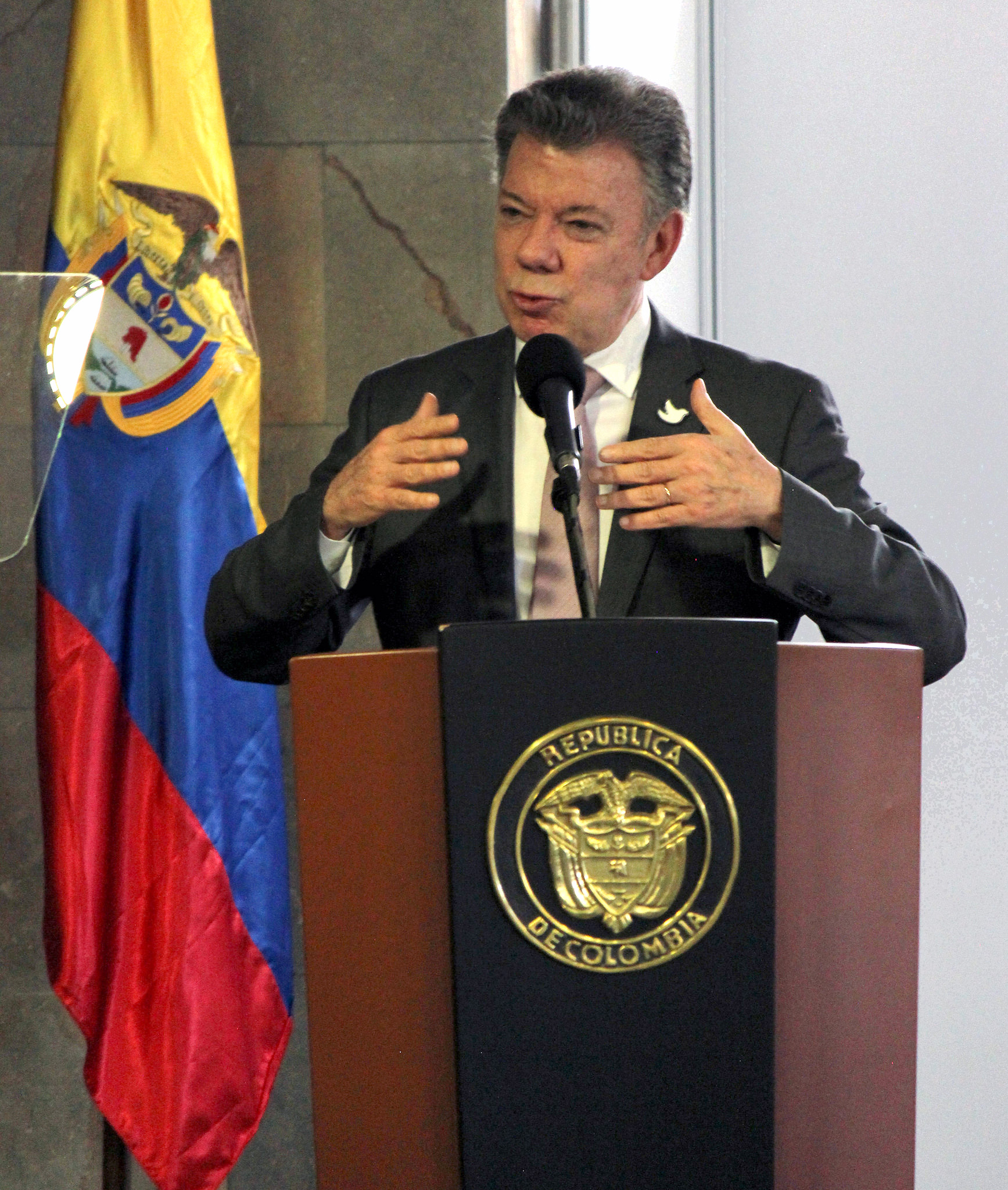
Santos in 2016

On 20 November 2013, Santos announced his intent to run for re-election in a presidential address, and formalized his intent by filing election papers with the National Civil Registry on 25 November. As the incumbent president he ran virtually unopposed in the Social Party of National Unity convention, receiving 772 votes of the 787 party delegates, and receiving the party's nomination on 28 January 2014. Santos and his allies also lobbied for the support of other political parties, receiving the nomination from the Liberal and Radical Change parties, forming the National Unity Coalition.

On 12 March Santos officially launched his re-election campaign for the 2014 presidential election under the slogan: "We have done much, there is much to be done". On 24 February, Santos announced that the running mate for his 2014 reelection campaign would be is Germán Vargas Lleras, a veteran politician from one of Colombia's most powerful political dynasties, and his former Minister of Housing, City and Territory. The decision to replace Vice President Garzón as his running mate was an expected one, as Garzón had already announced his desire to retire from politics.

On 15 May, Santos obtained 25.69% of the votes, falling behind his main rival, Óscar Iván Zuluaga Escobar of the Democratic Center, who obtained 29.25% of the votes. Since no one candidate earned the required majority, a run-off election was announced. In the second round, Santos received the backing and support of his former electoral rival: Clara López Obregón of the Alternative Democratic Pole, as well from dissident members of the Conservative and Green parties.

On 15 June, Santos won 50.95% of the popular vote in the second round of the election. President Santos addressed supporters and volunteers gathered at the campaign's headquarters in the Claustro de La Enseñanza after his reelection and said: "This is the end of 50 years of conflict in this country, and it is the beginning of a new Colombia". Santos's victory, which was much smaller than his landslide result in 2010, was credited with strategic endorsements from left-wing politicians such as Clara López who appeared on a T.V. endorsement for Santos despite having nearly polar opposite views on many issues. This helped Santos, who had been neck and neck with his Conservative challenger on polls up to the second election round. Many among the Left whose fortunes had declined since the start of the FARC insurgency hoped a peaceful negotiation with FARC, which required a Santos victory, would help rehabilitate the left among the Conservative-Liberal dominated political scene in Colombia.

==== Payments from Brazilian conglomerate Odebrecht ====
On 14 March 2017 Santos acknowledged that his 2010 election campaign received illegal payments from Brazilian conglomerate Odebrecht.

==== Paradise Papers ====
In November 2017, an investigation conducted by the International Consortium of Investigative Journalism claimed Juan Manuel Santos was in control of two offshore companies in Barbados. Following this, Santos clarified that he left the managing board of one of these companies before holding a ministerial office.

== Post-presidency (2018–present) ==
Following the end of his second term, Santos was named as the fourth Angelopoulos Global Public Leaders Fellowship program at the Harvard Kennedy School, where he served through the spring semester.

== Family and personal life ==
Santos is the son of Enrique Santos Castillo and his wife Clemencia Calderón Nieto, his brothers are: Enrique, Luis Fernando, and Felipe. The Santos family has been a well established and influential family since the mid-20th century; his great-great-grandaunt was María Antonia Santos Plata, a martyr of the Independence of Colombia, and his great-granduncle was Eduardo Santos Montejo, President of Colombia between 1938 and 1942, who acquired the national newspaper El Tiempo. From there, his family has been connected to the newspaper and influenced the political life of the country; Eduardo's brother, Enrique, grandfather of Juan Manuel, and editor in chief of El Tiempo, was known as "Calibán" to his readers, and his three sons, Enrique (Juan Manuel's father) and Hernando Santos Castillo, and Enrique Santos Molano were chief editor, director, and columnist respectively. Through his father's brother, Hernando, and his mother's sister, Elena, Juan Manuel is also first cousin on both sides to Francisco Santos Calderón, former Vice President of Colombia during the previous administration from 2002 to 2010. His first cousin Alberto Calderón Palau is the father of racing driver Tatiana Calderón.

Santos first married Silvia Amaya Londoño, a film director and television presenter, but divorced three years later having no children together. He then married María Clemencia Rodríguez Múnera, or "Tutina" as she is known to those close to her, an industrial designer he had met while she worked as a private secretary at the Ministry of Communications and he was Deputy Director of El Tiempo. Together they had three children, Martín (born 1989), María Antonia (born 1991), and Esteban (born 1993).

== Honours and awards ==
- The 2016 Nobel Peace Prize was awarded to the President of Colombia Juan Manuel Santos "for his resolute efforts to bring the country's more than 50-year-long civil war to an end, a war that has cost the lives of at least 220,000 Colombians and displaced close to six million people."

=== Foreign nations ===
Award or decoration	Country	Date	Note
Order of the Aztec Eagle	Mexico	1 August 2011	
Grand Collar of the Order of Prince Henry	Portugal	14 November 2012	
Knight Grand Cross of the Two Sicilian Royal Sacred Military Constantinian Order of Saint George, Special Class	Two Sicilies	7 June 2013	
Grand Cross with Gold Star of the Order of Francisco Morazán	Honduras	28 January 2014	
Knight Collar of the Order of Isabella the Catholic	Spain	28 February 2015	
Medal of Military Merit, First Class	Mexico	7 May 2015	
Medal of Naval Merit, First Class	Mexico	7 May 2015	
Honorary Knight Grand Cross of the Order of the Bath	United Kingdom	2016	
Grand Cross with Gold Star of the National Order of Doctor José Matías Delgado	El Salvador	2016	
Grand Collar of the National Order of Merit	Paraguay	24 April 2017	
Grand Collar of the Order of Liberty	Portugal	13 November 2017	

=== International awards ===
- King of Spain Prize
- Peace Lamp of St. Francis of Assisi
- Global Statesman Award
- Gernika Award for Peace and Reconciliation
- Shalom Prize
- New Economy Forum Prize 2016
- The Inter-American Dialogue's Distinguished Lifetime Achievement Award for Peace
- National Geographic Society Honors President Juan Manuel Santos of Colombia for his Unwavering Commitment to Conservation. President Santos has done more than many elected leaders in the Americas to expand protected areas.
- Colombian President awarded Kew International Medal for work protecting biodiversity.
- Harvard Law School's 2017 Great Negotiator Award
- Tipperary International Peace Award 2017
- Chatham House Prize

=== Other recognition ===
A new plant species from Northeastern Colombia has been named Espeletia praesidentis, in honour of efforts made by President Santos to build peace.

== Popular culture ==
- In TV Series Pablo Escobar, The Drug Lord, is portrayed by Andrés Aramburo as the character of Mariano Santana.
- Santos is portrayed by Ricardo Vélez in TV Series Tres Caínes as the character of Santamaría.

== Selected works ==
- Santos Calderón, Juan Manuel (1994). Colombia Sin Fronteras: Para Un Nuevo Futuro. Bogotá: Colombian Ministry of Foreign Trade. OCLC 34283634.
- Santos Calderón, Juan Manuel (1994). El Nuevo Camino al Progreso. Bogotá: Colombian Ministry of Foreign Trade. OCLC 253690673.
- Santos Calderón, Juan Manuel; Hommes Rodríguez, Rudolf; et al. (1994). Prácticas Comerciales y Perspectivas Macroeconómicas. Bogotá: Cladei. ISBN 9789589394007. OCLC 318185414.
- Santos Calderón, Juan Manuel; Blair, Tony (1999). La Tercera Vía: Una Alternativa Para Colombia. Bogotá: Aguilar. ISBN 9789588061313. OCLC 318268059.
- Santos Calderón, Juan Manuel; Carrasquilla Barrera, Alberto (2000). Memorias de Hacienda. Bogotá: Colombian Ministry of Finance and Public Credit. OCLC 318238583.
- Santos Calderón, Juan Manuel (2009). Jaque al Terror: Los Años Horribles de las FARC (2nd, illustrated. ed.). Bogotá: Planeta. ISBN 9789584223029. OCLC 605944076.

Political offices
Preceded by Humberto De la Calle	Presidential Designate of Colombia; 1993–1994	Office abolished
New office	Minister of Foreign Trade; 1991–1994	Succeeded by Daniel Mazuera Gómez
Preceded by Juan Camilo Restrepo Salazar	Minister of Finance and Public Credit; 2000–2002	Succeeded by Roberto Junguito Bonnet
Preceded by Camilo Ospina Bernal	Minister of National Defense; 2006–2009	Succeeded by Freddy Padilla de León; Acting
Preceded by Álvaro Uribe	President of Colombia; 2010–2018	Succeeded by Iván Duque
Party political offices
Preceded by Álvaro Uribe	Party of the U nominee for President of Colombia; 2010, 2014	Succeeded by Germán Vargas Lleras
Diplomatic posts
Preceded by Sebastián Piñera	President pro tempore of the Pacific Alliance; 2013–2014	Succeeded by Enrique Peña Nieto
Preceded by Michelle Bachelet	President pro tempore of the Pacific Alliance; 2017–2018	Succeeded by Martin Vizcarra
Awards and achievements
Preceded by Tunisian National Dialogue Quartet	Laureate of the Nobel Peace Prize; 2016	Succeeded by International Campaign to Abolish Nuclear Weapons
