= Mauricio Cárdenas Santamaría =

Colombian economist and politician (born 1962)

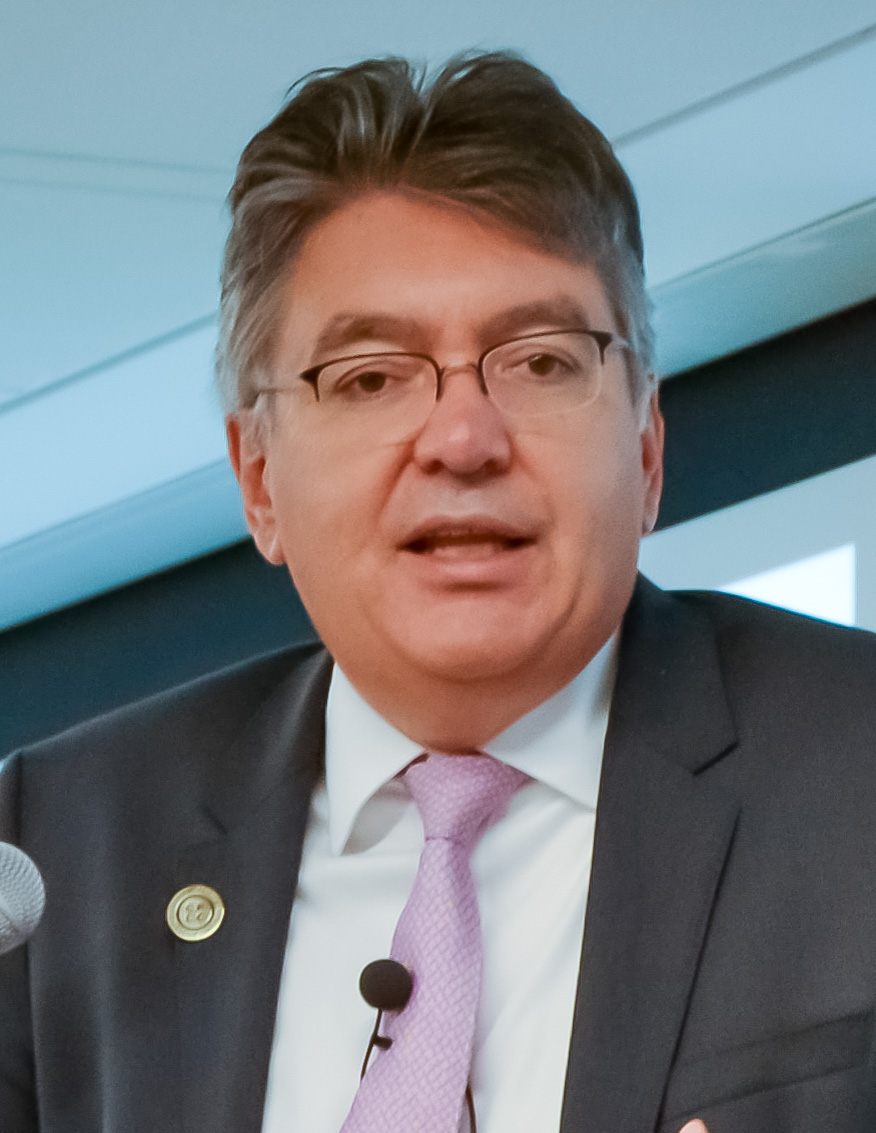

Minister of Finance and Public Credit
- In office 3 September 2012 – 7 August 2018
- President: Juan Manuel Santos
- Preceded by: Juan Carlos Echeverry
- Succeeded by: Alberto Carrasquilla Barrera

Minister of Mines and Energy
- In office 26 September 2011 – 3 September 2012
- President: Juan Manuel Santos
- Preceded by: Carlos Rodado Noriega
- Succeeded by: Federico Renjifo Vélez

General Director of National Planning
- In office 13 August 1999 – 27 August 2000
- President: Andrés Pastrana
- Preceded by: Jaime Ruíz Llano
- Succeeded by: Juan Carlos Echeverry

Minister of Transport
- In office 7 August 1998 – 13 August 1999
- President: Andrés Pastrana
- Preceded by: Rodrigo Marín Bernal
- Succeeded by: Gustavo Canal Mora

Minister of Economic Development
- In office 17 January 1994 – 7 August 1994
- President: César Gaviria
- Preceded by: Luis Alberto Moreno
- Succeeded by: Rodrigo Marín Bernal

Personal details
- Born: Mauricio Cárdenas Santamaría; 9 June 1962 (age 64) Medellín, Antioquia, Colombia
- Party: Conservative Party
- Spouse: Cristina Fernández Mejía (m. 1998)
- Children: Isabela; Andrea; Amalia
- Education: University of the Andes; University of California, Berkeley
- Website: Official website

Mauricio Cárdenas Santamaría (born 9 June 1962) is a Colombian economist and politician who served as the 69th Minister of Finance and Public Credit and former Minister of Mines and Energy of Colombia in the administration of President Juan Manuel Santos Calderón. Prior to this, he was a Senior Fellow and Director of the Latin America Initiative at the Brookings Institution.

== Early life and education ==
Born to Jorge Cárdenas Gutiérrez, former President of the National Federation of Coffee Growers of Colombia, and his wife Cecilia Santamaría Botero on 9 June 1962 in Medellín, Antioquia; the third of four children, his other siblings are: Patricia Eugenia, Jorge Hernán, and Eduardo.

Cardenas holds a doctorate in economics from the University of California at Berkeley.

== Career ==
For the Government of Colombia, Cardenas served as the 4th Minister of Economic Development, the 6th Minister of Transport, and former Director of the National Planning Department. As Minister of Finance, he also represented the government on the seven-member board of the country's Central Bank.

In the private sector has served as 11th and 9th Director of the Higher Education and Development Foundation (Fedesarrollo), as the 7th President Latin American and Caribbean Economic Association (LACEA), as former President of Titularizadora Colombiana S.A., and as General Manager of Empresa de Energía de Bogotá S.A. ESP. On 20 September 2011 President Juan Manuel Santos Calderón designated Cárdenas to succeed Juan Carlos Echeverry as Minister of Economy. He was sworn in as the 29th Minister of Mines and Energy on 26 September.

== Later career ==
After leaving government, Cardenas joined various academic institutions. In 2019, he became a Visiting Senior Research Scholar at the Center on Global Energy Policy of Columbia University's School of International and Public Affairs (SIPA).

Since 2020, Cardenas has been serving as a member of the Independent Panel for Pandemic Preparedness and Response (IPPR), an independent group examining how the World Health Organization (WHO) and countries handled the COVID-19 pandemic, co-chaired by Helen Clark and Ellen Johnson Sirleaf.

== Other activities ==
- Central American Bank for Economic Integration (CABEI), Ex-Officio Member of the Board of Governors (2012-2018)
- Inter-American Investment Corporation (IIC), Ex-Officio Member of the Board of Governors (2012-2018)
- International Monetary Fund (IMF), Ex-Officio Alternate Member of the Board of Governors (2012-2018)
- Multilateral Investment Guarantee Agency (MIGA), World Bank Group, Ex-Officio Member of the Board of Governors (2012-2018)
- World Bank, Ex-Officio Member of the Board of Governors (2012- 2018)

== Personal life ==
On 10 January 1998 Cardenas married Cristina Fernández Mejía in a Catholic wedding at the Santo Toribio de Mogrovejo Church in Cartagena de Indias; together they have three daughters: Isabella, Andrea and Amalia.

Political offices
Preceded by Juan Carlos Echeverry	Minister of Finance and Public Credit; 2012–present	Incumbent
