= Alejandro Cheyne =

Colombian academic (born 1968)

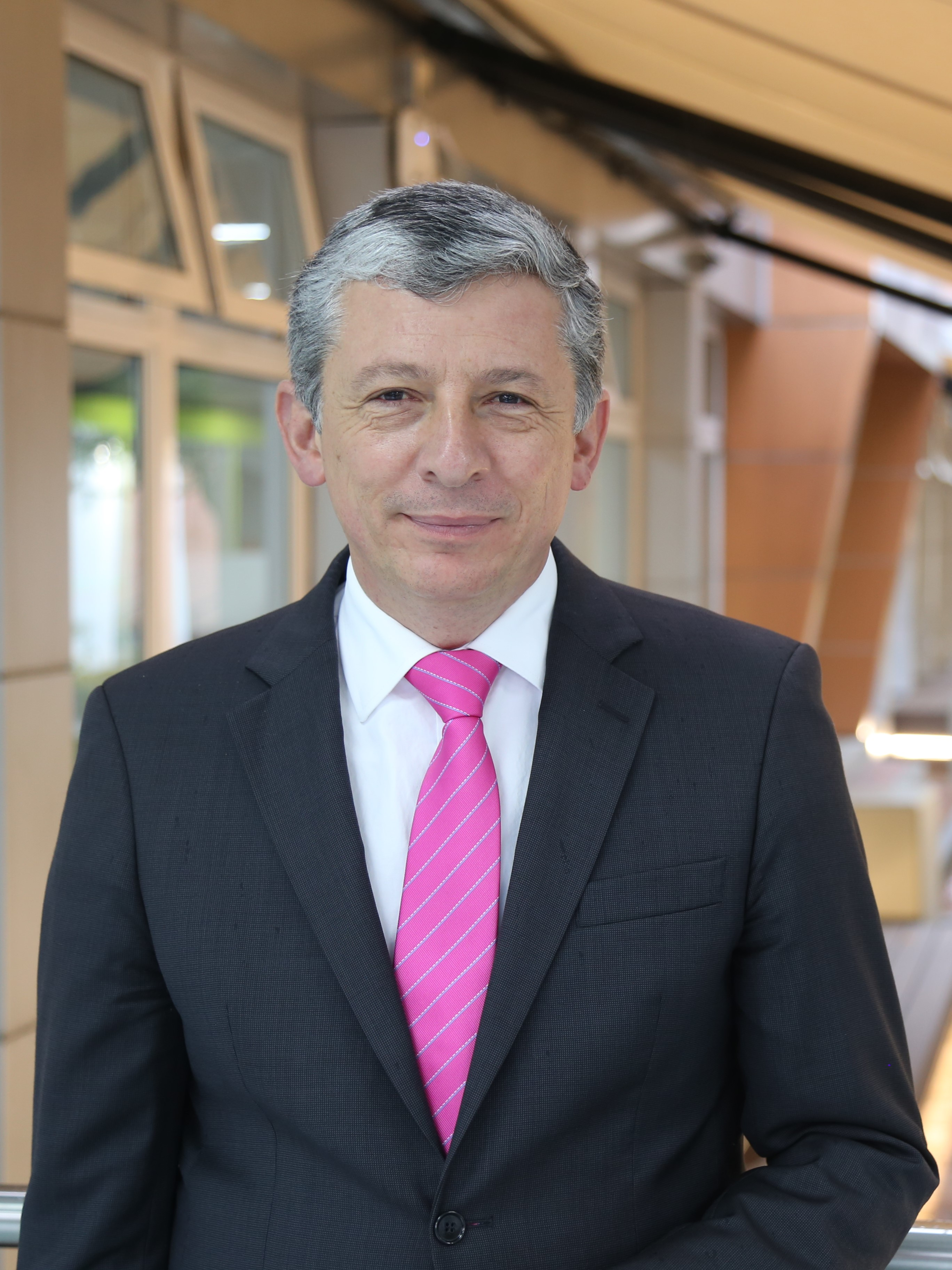
- Formal portrait, 2021

Rector of the Universidad del Rosario
- In office c. March 2018 – April 18, 2024
- Preceded by: José Manuel Restrepo
- Succeeded by: Ana Isabel Gómez

Personal details
- Born: José Alejandro Cheyne García; October 8, 1968 (age 57) Bogotá, D.C., Colombia
- Spouse: Olga Beltrán (m. 2014)
- Education: Universidad del Rosario (BSc); Universidad Popular Autónoma del Estado de Puebla
- Occupation: Economist; educator; journalist; columnist
- Website: Alejandro Cheyne

José Alejandro Cheyne García (born October 8, 1968) is a Colombian economist, educator, academic, and columnist who served as Rector of the Universidad del Rosario from 2018 to 2024.

Born in Bogotá, D.C., Cheyne holds a degree in economics from the Universidad del Rosario. He also holds a master's degree in education from the Universidad Popular Autónoma del Estado de Puebla.

In 2023, he was recognized as one of the most reputable leaders in the country.

== Career ==
Cheyne began her studies in economics at the Universida del Rosario, where she also completed specializations in business administration and University Teaching. Later, she earned a master's degree in Pedagogy from the Universidad Popular Autónoma del Estado de Puebla and subsequently a doctorate from the same university.

Cheyne has served as a full-time professor at the School of Management of Universidad del Rosario. In 2023, he became the first Latin American to be appointed Board Chair of the firm ACBSP.

In 2018, he was elected rector of the Universidad del Rosario, succeeding José Manuel Restrepo. In 2022, he was re-elected for another four-year term, but was ultimately removed from office in 2024.

Academic offices
Preceded by José Manuel Restrepo	Rector of the Universidad del Rosario; 2018–2024	Succeeded by Ana Isabel Gómez
