= José Manuel Restrepo =

Vice President of Colombia since 2026

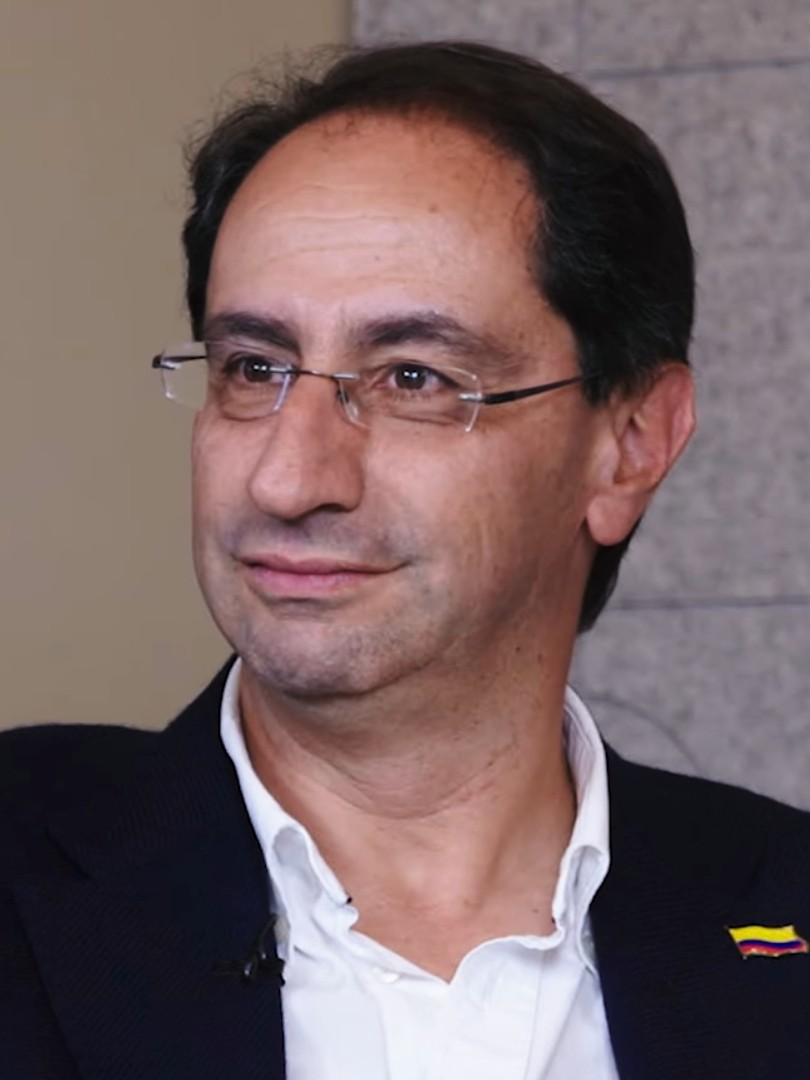
- Restrepo in 2026

14th Vice President of Colombia
- Incumbent
- Assumed office 7 August 2026
- President: Abelardo de la Espriella
- Preceded by: Francia Márquez

Minister of Finance and Public Credit
- In office 3 May 2021 – 7 August 2022
- President: Iván Duque
- Preceded by: Alberto Carrasquilla
- Succeeded by: José Antonio Ocampo

Minister of Commerce, Industry and Tourism
- In office 7 August 2018 – 3 May 2021
- President: Iván Duque
- Preceded by: María Lorena Gutiérrez
- Succeeded by: María Ximena Lombana

Rector of the Universidad del Rosario
- In office 22 September 2014 – 7 August 2018
- Preceded by: Hans-Peter Knudsen
- Succeeded by: Alejandro Cheyne

Personal details
- Born: José Manuel Restrepo Abondano; 31 August 1970 (age 56) Bogotá, D.C., Colombia
- Party: Defenders of the Homeland (since 2026)
- Other political affiliations: Conservative (2006–2026)
- Spouse: Tatiana Cespedes (m. 2001)
- Children: 3
- Relatives: José Manuel Restrepo Vélez (great-great grandfather); Francisco de Paula Santander (sixth great-great grandfather); Sixta Pontón de Santander (sixth great-great grandmother)
- Education: Del Rosario University; London School of Economics; University of Bath (DBA)
- Website: Defensores de la Patria - Political Movement

José Manuel Restrepo Abondano (born 31 August 1970) is a Colombian academic, economist, journalist and politician who is the vice president of Colombia since 2026. He also served as the Minister of Finance and Public Credit and Minister of Commerce, Industry and Tourism in the Iván Duque government.

He has a university degree and a postgraduate degree from the Del Rosario University, a master's degree in economics from the London School of Economics, and a DBA in Higher Education Management from the University of Bath in England. He has also served as rector of his alma mater Del Rosario University. For many years he wrote weekly columns for newspapers El Nuevo Siglo and El Espectador. Ideologically, Restrepo holds conservative and right-wing political views. On 10 March 2026, he was announced as the vice-presidential running mate of candidate Abelardo de la Espriella in the 2026 Colombian presidential election.

== Education ==
José Manuel Restrepo Abondano was born in 1970, and grew up in Bogotá, Colombia. He attended the all-boys Gimnasio Campestre school, a conservative school in the Orquideas district of Bogotá.

He graduated from the Del Rosario University in Bogotá in 1994, and completed a master's degree in economics from the London School of Economics in 1998. He completed a Postgraduate Degree in Finance and Executive Management from the Rosario University in 2004, and a DBA in Higher Education Management from the University of Bath in England in 2015.

== Professional career ==
Restrepo started his career working as an advisor to the Economic Commission (committee) of the Congress of the Republic of Colombia. He continued his career in the civil service, becoming Budget and Financial Planning Director of Fonade, the National Fund for Development Projects in Colombia.

From 2009 to 2014, Restrepo was the rector of Colegio de Estudios Superiores de Administración (CESA) in Bogotá. He also served as the rector of the Business Foundation of the Chamber of Commerce of Bogotá. On 22 September 2014, he was elected rector of his alma mater Del Rosario University.

For ten years he wrote a weekly column for the Bogotá-based newspaper El Nuevo Siglo, and in 2013 became a weekly columnist for Colombia's oldest newspaper El Espectador. His last column was published on 21 July, one week after the announcement of his ministerial appointment.

== Political career ==
In an interview in May 2018, Restrepo talked about becoming politically engaged at university stating that, along with a group of fellow students, he launched a civic movement called "Political Civic Movement, New People". The students stood for local elections in seven districts of Bogotá, three successfully being elected. He was one of the successful students, being elected to the district council of Chapinero, the second district of Bogotá.

On 14 July 2018, President-elect Iván Duque announced on Twitter that he had appointed Restrepo to his government as Minister of Commerce, Industry and Tourism of Colombia. President Duque described Restrepo as "one of the most illustrious Colombians of our generation ... who will make history in office". Restrepo formally took office on 7 August 2018, following President Duque's inauguration.

He was appointed as Colombia's Minister of Finance and Public Credit on May 3, 2021. He remained in office until August 7, 2022, concluding his term when the Duque administration transitioned power to incoming President Gustavo Petro.

He opposed a 23.7% increase in the minimum wage decreed by President Gustavo Petro in 2025, arguing that the president bypassed standard technical criteria and ignored productivity and inflation benchmarks stipulated by law, and petitioned the Council of State to overturn it. In February 2026, the Council of State provisionally suspended the decree, citing a lack of verifiable legal and economic justification.

Academic offices
| Preceded by Hans-Peter Knudsen | Rector of the Universidad del Rosario; 2014–2018 | Succeeded by Alejandro Cheyne |
Political offices
| Preceded by María Lorena Gutiérrez | Minister of Commerce, Industry and Tourism; 2018–2021 | Succeeded by María Ximena Lombana |
| Preceded by Alberto Carrasquilla Barrera | Minister of Finance and Public Credit; 2021–2022 | Succeeded by José Antonio Ocampo |
| Preceded by Francia Márquez | Vice President of Colombia; 2026–present | Incumbent |
Lines of succession
| First | Presidential line of succession in Colombia as Vice President of Colombia | Succeeded by Rodrigo Lara Restrepo as Minister of the Interior |
Order of precedence
| Preceded by Abelardo de la Espriella as President | Order of precedence of Colombia; Second in order as Vice President of Colombia | Succeeded by Luis José Rueda as Cardinal Primate of Colombia |
