= Stephany Griffith-Jones =

Economist (born 1947)

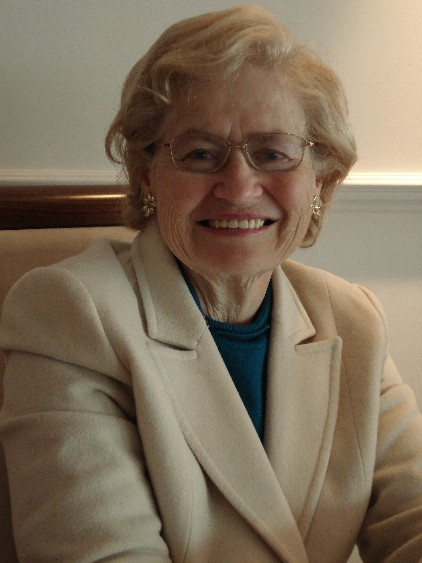
- Born: June 5, 1947 (age 79)
- Spouse: Robert Griffith-Jones

Academic background
- Education: University of Chile (BA); Cambridge University (PhD)
- Influences: John Maynard Keynes; Hyman Minsky; James Tobin; Charles P. Kindleberger; John Kenneth Galbraith; Joseph Stiglitz

Academic work
- Discipline: Financial economics Development economics
- School or tradition: New Keynesian economics
- Institutions: Initiative for Policy Dialogue; Overseas Development Institute
- Awards: Distinguished Czech Woman of the World Award (2006); ALIDE prize for best essay on Latin America's international finance (1983)

Stephany Griffith-Jones (born Stepanka Novy Kafka on 5 June 1947) is an economist specializing in international finance and development. Her expertise lies in the reform of the international financial system, particularly in financial regulation, global governance, and international capital flows. Currently, she serves as a member of the Governor Board at the Central Bank of Chile. She has held various positions throughout her career, including financial markets director at the Initiative for Policy Dialogue based at Columbia University, associate fellow at the Overseas Development Institute, and professorial fellow at the Institute of Development Studies at Sussex University.

Griffith-Jones has an extensive background in international organizations, having worked as deputy director of International Finance at the Commonwealth Secretariat, and for the United Nations Department of Economic and Social Affairs and the United Nations Economic Commission for Latin America and the Caribbean. Her career began in 1970 at the Central Bank of Chile, and she also gained experience at Barclays Bank International in the UK before joining the Institute of Development Studies. She has served as a senior consultant to governments in Eastern Europe and Latin America, as well as to international agencies such as the World Bank, the Inter-American Development Bank, the European Commission, UNICEF, UNDP, and the United Nations Conference on Trade and Development. Griffith-Jones was a member of the Warwick Commission on international financial reform.

As an author, Griffith-Jones has published over 20 books and has written numerous scholarly and journalistic articles. One of her notable works is the book Time for the Visible Hand: Lessons from the 2008 Crisis, which she co-edited with José Antonio Ocampo and Joseph Stiglitz, published in 2010.

Griffith-Jones was born in Prague and moved to Chile at the age of one. She received her primary and secondary education in Chile and graduated from the University of Chile. Notably, she is the niece of Franz Kafka. She adopted her current surname after marrying British mathematician Robert Griffith-Jones. Additionally, she served as an economic advisor to Chilean president Gabriel Boric during his presidential campaign.

== Contributions to economic analysis and policy ==
Griffith-Jones has contributed to research and policy suggestions on how to make the domestic and international financial system more stable so it can better serve the needs of inclusive economic development and the real economy. One of her first articles, The Growth of Multinational Banking, the Euro-currency market and their effects on developing countries in the Journal of Development Studies, published in 1980, warned of the risk of excessive international bank lending to developing economies.

Her 1986 book with Osvaldo Sunkel, Debt and Development Crises in Latin America: The End of An Illusion, showed the negative effects of the 1980s Latin American debt crisis on the region's economic development. She was an early advocate of debt relief in Latin America and Sub-Saharan Africa.

Writing with Ricardo Ffrench-Davis in the 1990s she contributed to the debate on how Latin America could curb and manage volatile capital flows. She again warned of the risks of costly financial crises if sufficient measures such as capital controls were not implemented.

After several financial crises, mainly in developing countries, she started in the mid-1990s to advocate capital flow regulations in capital source countries as a way to curb excessive and volatile capital flows. She believed this would reduce the risk of major reversals of capital flows and the financial crises that result from them. This is further discussed in her 1998 book Global Capital Flows, should they be regulated?

In the discussion on reform of the international financial architecture she contributed to the analysis of crisis prevention, especially through financial regulation and more effective financial crisis management. For example, she advocated special drawing rights issues by the International Monetary Fund (IMF) as a means to provide official liquidity when private capital flows fall sharply. She also advocated expanded and less conditional IMF lending so countries do not have to unnecessarily adjust their economies, especially in the face of financial crises or other external shocks.

Writing with José Antonio Ocampo since the late 1990s they expanded the concept of counter-cyclical reform of the international financial system to help stabilise capital flows and domestic private lending. The aim was to avoid frequent costly crises, facilitate macro-economic management and to achieve stable and inclusive economic growth in developing countries.

She has worked on practical policy applications of these ideas. She has advocated reform of compensatory financing at the IMF in the face of external shocks to make it larger, speedier and with less conditionality. Similarly she was an early supporter of expanding development banks - nationally, regionally and multilaterally - and their role in counter-cyclical lending. She has also advocated the issue of GDP-linked bonds as a counter-cyclical mechanism to reduce the risk of financial crises. She has long supported the idea of counter-cyclical regulation. These and other practical measures are aimed at reforming the financial system so that it supports stable inclusive economic growth without costly financial crises.

== Publications ==
Selected books

- 2010, Time for a Visible Hand: Lessons from the 2008 World Financial Crisis, edited with José Antonio Ocampo and Joseph Stiglitz, Oxford University Press, 2010
- 2007, International Finance and Development, with José Antonio Ocampo and Jan Kregel, Orient Longman, 2007
- 2003, From Capital Surges to Drought, Seeking Stability for Emerging Economies, edited with Ricardo Ffrench-Davis, Palgrave, 2003
- 2003, International Capital Flows in Calm and Turbulent Times, The Need for New International Architecture, edited with Ricardo Gottschalk and Jacques Cailloux, The University of Michigan Press, 2003
- 2001, Managing Capital Surges in Emerging Markets, edited with Manuel Montes and Anwar Nasution, Oxford University Press, 2001
- 1999, Private Capital Flows to Africa, with Louis Kasekende and Matthew Martin et al., FONDAD, 1999
- 1998, Global Capital Flows, should they be regulated? with preface by Nobel Prize winner James Tobin, Macmillan and St. Martin's Press, 1998
- 1995, Coping With Capital Surges: The Return of Finance to Latin America, edited with Ricardo Ffrench-Davis, Lynne Rienner, 1995
- 1994, Financial Sector Reform in Central and Eastern Europe, edited with Z. Drabek, Macmillan, 1994
- 1992, Debt, Cross-Conditionality and Banking Regulations, edited with Ennio Rodriguez, Macmillan, 1992
- 1986, Debt and Development Crises in Latin America: The End of An Illusion, with Osvaldo Sunkel, Oxford University Press, 1986

Selected book chapters

- Griffith-Jones, Stephany; Ocampo, José Antonio (2014), "Helping control boom-bust in finance through countercyclical regulation", in Stewart, Frances; Cornia, Giovanni A. (eds.), Towards human development new approaches to macroeconomics and inequality, Oxford, Oxfordshire: Oxford University Press, pp. 269–290, ISBN 9780198706083
- 2010, “Agenda and Criteria for Financial regulatory Reform” with Jane D’Arista in Griffith-Jones, Ocampo and Stiglitz (eds.), Time for a Visible Hand: Lessons from the 2008 World Financial Crisis, Oxford University Press
- 2008, "The Pro-cyclical Impact of Basle II on Emerging Markets and its Political Economy" with Avinash Persaud, in Stiglitz and Ocampo (eds.), Capital market liberalization and Development, Oxford University Press
- 2005, “Should capital controls have a place in the future international monetary system?” with Ricardo Gottschalk and John Williamson, in Marc Uzan (ed), The future of the International Monetary System, Elgar
- 1991, "International financial markets: a case of market failure" in Christopher Colclough and James Manor (eds.), States or Markets? Neo-liberalism and the Development Policy Debate, Oxford University Press

Selected articles in journals

- 2003, “How to Prevent the New Basel Capital Accord Harming Developing Countries”, Presented at IMF-World Bank Annual Meetings September 2003
- 2003, "Basel II and Developing Countries: Diversification and Portfolio Effects" with Miguel Segoviano and Stephen Spratt, ECLAC Review
- 2000, "Proposals for a Better International Financial System", World Economics, vol. 2, April – June.
- 1992, "Conversion of official bilateral debt: opportunities and issues", Proceedings of World Bank Annual Conference on Development Economics
- 1991, "Creditor countries' banking and fiscal regulations: can changes encourage debt relief?", Journal of Development Studies, 27 (3): April
- 1985, "Ways forward from the debt crisis", Oxford Review of Economic Policy, 2 (1), Winter.

Selected articles in popular press

- 2012, Osborne will score a financial own-goal tomorrow, New Statesman, Dec 2012
- 2012, Stimulating Europe, The FT, June 2012
- 2012, Historic moment for the IMF, The FT, May 2012
- 2012, Why critics are wrong about a financial-transaction tax, with Avinash Persaud, European Voice, March 2012
- 2012, Transforming the financial sector from a bad master to a good servant, Left Foot Forward, February 2012
- 2010, "The Movers and the Makers", The Broker
- 2010, "The reform of financial markets", El Pais (Spanish), June 2010
- 2009, "Now let's tax transactions", The Guardian
- 2006, "A bond that insures against instability", with Robert J. Shiller, Financial Times, July 2006
- 2003, "Encouraging Capital Flows in times of drought", The Banker, July 2003
- 2003, "A capital idea that will hurt poorer countries", Financial Times, May 2003
- 2001, "Pivotal change at Doha", The Guardian, November 2001

Video and online sources

- 2012, Robin Hood Tax to the rescue? on YouTube, Al Jazeera, July 2012
- 2012, Columbia's Griffith-Jones Discusses Libor Scandal, Bloomberg, July 2012
- 2012. Insider Trading on a Massive Scale, The Real News Network, July 2012

== See also ==
- List of economists
