= Alberto Carrasquilla Barrera =

Colombian politician and economist

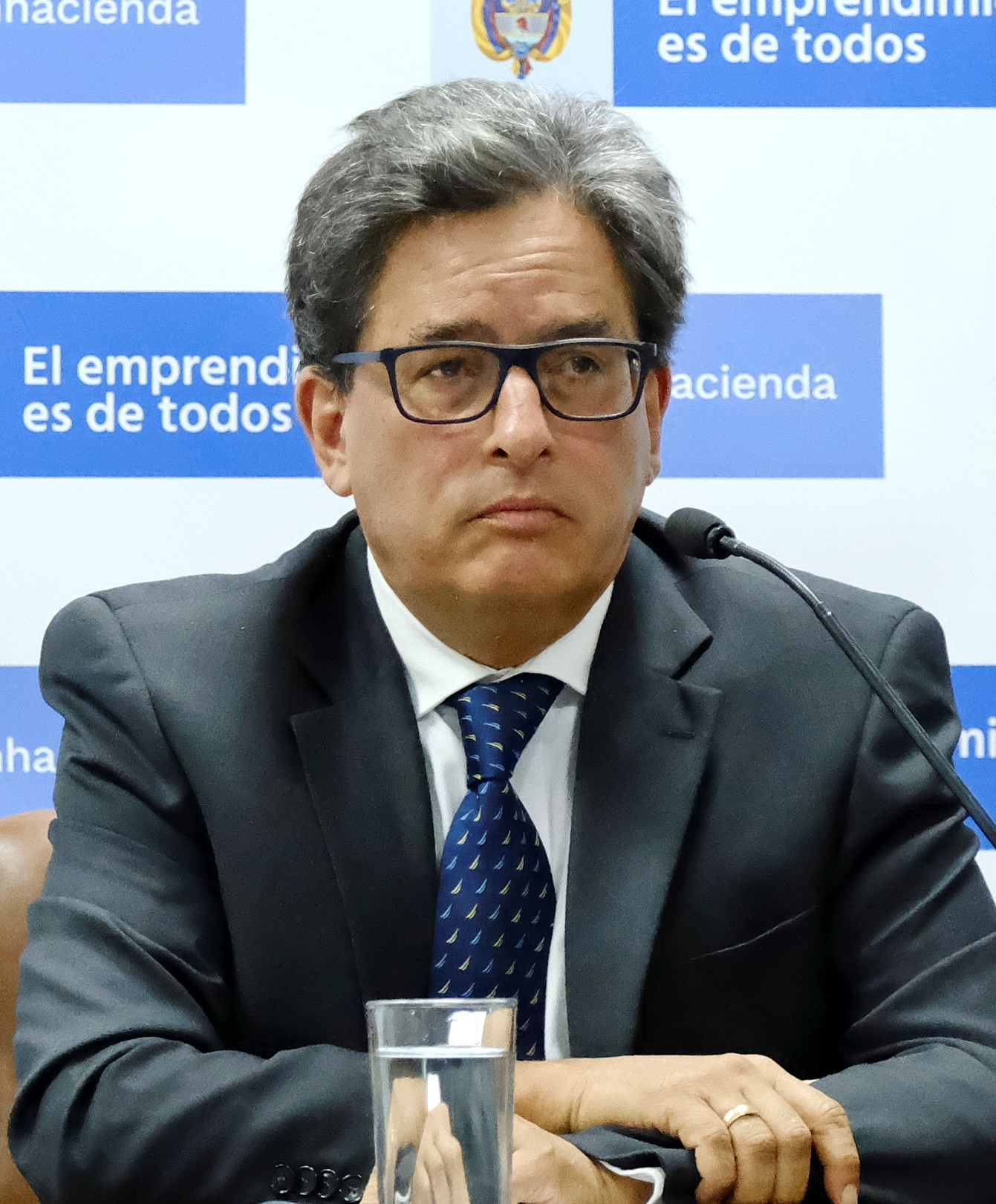

Minister of Finance and Public Credit
- In office 7 August 2018 – 3 May 2021
- President: Iván Duque
- Preceded by: Mauricio Cárdenas
- Succeeded by: José Manuel Restrepo
- In office 20 June 2003 – 7 March 2007
- President: Álvaro Uribe
- Preceded by: Roberto Bonnet
- Succeeded by: Óscar Iván Zuluaga

Personal details
- Born: 24 April 1959 (age 67) Bogotá, D.C., Colombia
- Education: University of the Andes (B.Sc.); University of Illinois (M.Sc., Ph.D.)
- Profession: Economist

Alberto Carrasquilla Barrera (born April 24, 1959) is a Colombian politician who served as the Minister of Finance and Public Credit under the government of President Iván Duque, and previously under President Álvaro Uribe. In May 2021 he resigned office over the protests surrounding a controversial tax reform in the middle of the COVID-19 pandemic.

== Education ==
Carrasquilla studied economics at the University of Los Andes in Bogotá and has a doctorate from the University of Illinois Urbana-Champaign.

== Career ==
- Technical Manager of the Bank of the Republic
- Economist, Research leader for the Inter-American Development Bank.
- Dean of the Economics Department at the University of the Andes.
- Colombian Viceminister of Finance in 2002.
- Was elected President of the World Bank and International Monetary Fund Development Committee in 2005.
- elected President of the Andean Fomenting Corporation Directorate since 2006.
- (Inactive) member of the Latin American Financial Affairs Committee (CLAAF).
- As Minister of Finance and Public Credit receives an honorary membership to the Federación Nacional de Cafeteros de Colombia, President of the Executive Directorate of Bank of the Republic, member of the Executive Directorate of Ecopetrol and member of the Latin American Reserves Fund (FLAR)
- Was a weekly columnist of the Colombian newspaper of El Espectador and El Tiempo in Bogotá.

== Other activities ==
- Central American Bank for Economic Integration (CABEI), Ex-Officio Member of the Board of Governors (since 2018)
- Inter-American Investment Corporation (IIC), Ex-Officio Member of the Board of Governors (since 2018)
- International Monetary Fund (IMF), Ex-Officio Alternate Member of the Board of Governors (since 2018)
- Multilateral Investment Guarantee Agency (MIGA), World Bank Group, Ex-Officio Member of the Board of Governors (since 2018)
- World Bank, Ex-Officio Member of the Board of Governors (since 2018)

Political offices
Preceded by Roberto Junguito Bonnet	Minister of Finance and Public Credit of Colombia; 2003–2007	Succeeded by Óscar Iván Zuluaga Escobar
Preceded by Mauricio Cárdenas Santamaría	Minister of Finance and Public Credit of Colombia; 2018–2021	Succeeded by José Manuel Restrepo Abondano
