= Rudolf Hommes Rodríguez =

Colombian economist and politician

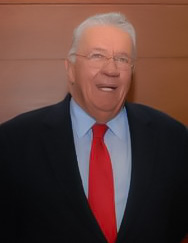

59th Minister of Finance and Public Credit of Colombia
- In office 7 August 1990 – 7 August 1994
- President: César Gaviria Trujillo
- Preceded by: Luis Fernando Alarcón Mantilla
- Succeeded by: Guillermo Perry

Personal details
- Born: 6 December 1943 (age 82) Bogotá, D.C., Colombia
- Education: California State University, Sacramento (BBA, BSc, MBA); University of Massachusetts Amherst (PhD)
- Profession: Economist

Rudolf Hommes Rodríguez (born 6 December 1943) is a Colombian economist and politician who served as Minister of Finance and Public Credit under the administration of President César Gaviria, introducing various liberal policies in Colombia's Economy. He is also a regular columnist on various Colombian media outlets, focusing primarily on finances.

Hommes attended California State University, Sacramento, where he received a BBA, a BSc, and an MBA; he also received a PhD in Management from the University of Massachusetts Amherst, and has been a professor of finance, statistics, economics, and decision theory at the University of the Andes.
