= Eduardo Wiesner Durán =

20th-century Colombian politician and Finance Minister

Minister of Finance and Public Credit of Colombia
- In office 1981–1982
- President: Julio Cesar Turbay Ayala
- Preceded by: Jaime Garcia Parra
- Succeeded by: Edgar Gutierrez Castro

Executive Director World Bank

Colombia, Brazil and the Philippines
- In office 1989

Director of Western Hemisphere Department International Monetary Fund
- In office 1982–1987

Personal details
- Spouse: Gloria Acero Rodríguez
- Parent(s): Eduardo Alfonso Wiesner Rozo & Maria Lucy Durán
- Education: University of the Andes; Stanford University

Eduardo Wiesner Durán, a Colombian politician and economist, served as Minister of Finance from 1978 to 1982. He holds a postgraduate degree from Stanford University.

== Career ==
Wiesner was President of the Bankers’ Association of Colombia 1976, National Professional Economics Council of Colombia 1977. He served as Head of National Planning Department. He was Director of Western Hemisphere Department, International Monetary Fund 1982–1987 and Special Trade Representative of International Monetary Fund since 1987. He worked as Director International Monetary Fund Office, Geneva since 1987 and became executive director of Colombia, Brazil and the Philippines at the World Bank May 1989.

Appointed director of the Mission for Decentralization and Finance of Territorial Entities, created by the Government of Colombia.

Wiesner headed the Bird-Wiesner Mission, or intergovernmental finance, in 1981 and, until 1990, served as executive director of Colombia, Brazil and the Philippines, among others, at the World Bank.
