= Óscar Iván Zuluaga =

Colombian politician and economist (born 1959)

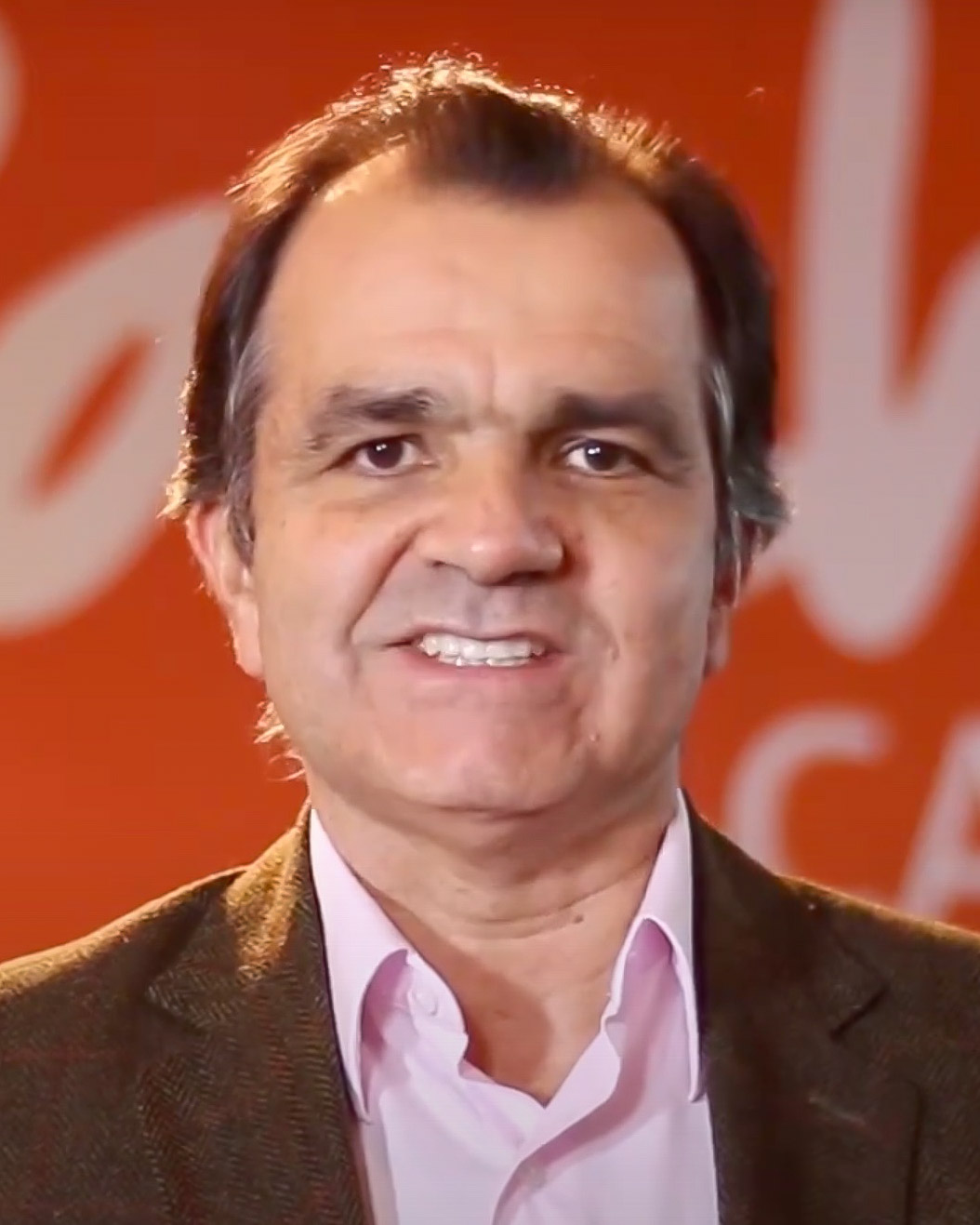
- Zuluaga in 2015.

Minister of Finance and Public Credit
- In office 5 February 2007 – 7 August 2010
- President: Álvaro Uribe
- Preceded by: Alberto Carrasquilla
- Succeeded by: Juan Carlos Echeverry

Senator of Colombia
- In office 20 July 2002 – 20 July 2006

Mayor of Pensilvania
- In office 1 January 1990 – 1 January 1992

Personal details
- Born: 3 February 1959 (age 67) Pensilvania, Caldas, Colombia
- Party: Democratic Center (since 2013)
- Other political affiliations: Civic People's Convergence (1989–2005); Social Party of National Unity (2005–2013)
- Spouse: Martha Ligia Martínez (m. 1987)
- Children: 3
- Education: Pontifical Xavierian University (B.A., 1982); University of Exeter (M.A., 1984)
- Profession: Economist

Óscar Iván Zuluaga Escobar (Spanish pronunciation: [ˈoskaɾ iˈβan suˈlwaɣa es.ko.ˈβaɾ]; born 3 February 1959) is a Colombian politician and economist who was the Democratic Center's nominee for President of Colombia in the 2014 election. He won the most votes in the first round of the election but went on to lose to the incumbent Juan Manuel Santos Calderon in the second round.

Óscar Iván Zuluaga, was officially charged with corruption in June 2023 by the Colombian justice system for having received $1.6 million from the multinational Odebrecht.

== Political career ==
Zuluaga began his career in Acerías de Colombia S.A., a steelmaking company owned by his family. Subsequently, he became involved in local politics, serving on the municipal council of Pensilvania, Caldas and as its Mayor. After returning to the family business he became vice president and president. During this time Zuluaga also served on the board of directors of the Bank of the Republic, Colombia's central bank, the National Federation of Merchants (Fenalco), the Federation of Metallurgical Industries of Colombia (Fedemetal), and the Colombo-Venezuelan Chamber of Commerce.

In 2001 he became involved in Álvaro Uribe Vélez's presidential campaign. Zuluaga was elected to the Senate of Colombia in March 2002; Uribe was victorious in Presidential elections held two months later. As a Senator he backed the amendment to the Colombian Constitution permitting Presidential re-election. Along with many other supporters of Uribe, Zuluaga joined the Social Party of National Unity in 2005, led by Juan Manuel Santos. Zuluaga did not stand for election to the Senate in 2006 and was subsequently appointed the 68th Minister of Finance and Public Credit of Colombia by Uribe.

Zuluaga is suspected of colluding with certain paramilitary groups in the country.

== 2014 presidential election ==
Zuluaga joined the newly formed Democratic Centre in 2013 and ran for its presidential nomination in the 2014 election against incumbent President Juan Manuel Santos Calderón. He defeated former Vice President Francisco Santos Calderón and former Interior Minister Carlos Holmes Trujillo in the Democratic Center Convention. Zuluaga then chose Holmes as his running mate.

Zuluaga, who was leading the polls a week before the election, became involved in a scandal after a video published by the news magazine Semana, showing Zuluaga getting secret military information from Andrés Fernando Sepulveda Ardila, who had been arrested on 5 May and accused of "managing an illegal office dedicated to intercepting emails from between those close to the peace dialogues in Havana (Cuba)", according to a news release published by the Office of the Attorney General of Colombia. In the video they discussed how to use this information to win the elections.

Zuluaga quickly denied any role in the hacking scandal calling the video a manipulation and a montage, "this video, which was made illegally, which is clearly a montage and a trap; for whoever has listened to it and watched it carefully, there is no conversation or declaration that demonstrates illegal conduct," he told reporters on Monday 19 May. But on 23 May, the Office of the Attorney General announced that the video was authentic and had not been doctored. It had been filmed by a campaign worker who told reporters he had become troubled by what he believed were illegal spying activities in the Zuluaga campaign.

The scandal led Zuluaga's campaign manager, Luis Alfonso Hoyos Aristizábal, to resign from the campaign after Colombian broadcaster RCN said that Hoyos and Sepulveda had offered it confidential information about the peace talks. Zuluaga accused Santos of orchestrating the scandal describing it as a trap set to derail his growing support, but Santos has not commented on the scandal itself. Enrique Peñalosa Londoño the Green Party candidate however, openly called for Zuluaga to resign, "we're talking about the crime of illegal wiretapping, conspiracy to commit a crime, and the crime of using military information and intelligence. We Colombians cannot resign ourselves to this. These are not the leaders we want", Peñalosa said. Former President Uribe came to the defence of Zuluaga stating "[Sepúlveda] is an alleged 'hacker' who has worked with [Venezuelan political strategist] J.J. Rendón, who's close to President Santos. In the video, they show Óscar Iván Zuluaga getting information that has already been in the rumour mill and has no relevance".

Óscar Iván Zuluaga is suspected of involvement in the corruption scandal Odebrecht.

== Personal life ==
Zuluaga was born on 3 February 1959 in Pensilvania, Caldas to Ovidio Zuluaga and Carina Escobar. He attended the Pontifical Xavierian University where graduated in 1982 as an economist. He later attended University of Exeter in the United Kingdom where he earned an M.A. in Public Finance.

Zuluaga married Martha Ligia Martínez Giraldo on 10 October 1987 in Barranquilla; together they have three children: David, Juliana, and Esteban.

Political offices
Preceded by Alberto Carrasquilla Barrera	Minister of Finance and Public Credit of Colombia; 2007–2010	Succeeded by Juan Carlos Echeverry Garzón
Party political offices
New political party	Democratic Center nominee for President of Colombia; 2014	Succeeded by Iván Duque
Preceded by Iván Duque	Democratic Center nominee for President of Colombia (withdrew); 2022	Most recent
