= Guillermo Perry =

Colombian economist and politician (died 2019)

Guillermo Perry Rubio (died 27 September 2019) was a Colombian economist and politician who served as Minister of Mines and Energy and Minister of Finance and Public Credit.
