= Roberto Junguito =

Colombian politician (1943–2020)

Roberto Junguito Bonnet (1943 – 27 December 2020) was a Colombian politician and economist who served as Minister of Agriculture and Rural Development and Minister of Finance and Public Credit.
