= Ministry of Finance and Public Credit =

Government ministry of Colombia

- Ministerio de Hacienda y Crédito Público

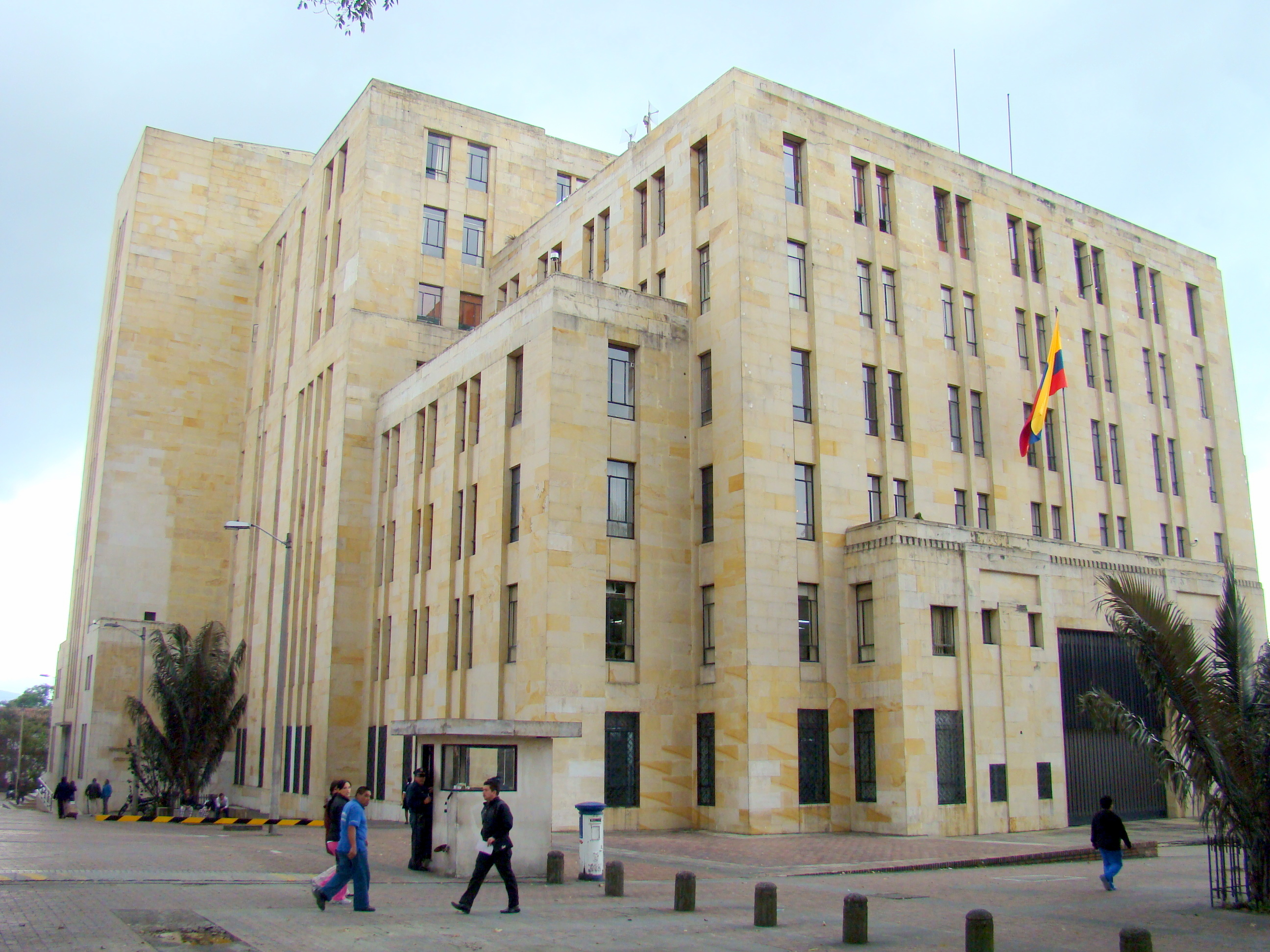
- Ministry Headquarters in Bogotá

Ministry overview
- Formed: 18 July 1923
- Preceding agencies: Ministry of Finance; Ministry of the Treasury
- Headquarters: Carrera 8 № 6-64 Bogotá; 04°35′38.61″N 74°04′42.02″W
- Annual budget: COP$9,304,856,303,466 (2012); COP$12,645,417,534,968 (2013); COP$18,101,483,002,550 (2014)
- Ministry executive: Minister
- Child agencies: DIAN; UIAF; SuperFinanciera; SuperSolidaria; FOGAFIN; FOGACOOP
- Website: www.minhacienda.gov.co

The Ministry of Finance and Public Credit (Spanish: Ministerio de Hacienda y Crédito Público), is the national executive ministry of the Government of Colombia responsible for the financial and budgetary matters of the country as well as implementing the financial policies passed by Congress, equivalent to the finance ministries of other countries.

The Ministry was created on 18 July 1923 by fusing together the existing Ministries of Finance and of the Treasury.

The Ministry of Finance and Public Credit is active in developing financial inclusion policy and is a member of the Alliance for Financial Inclusion.

== List of ministers of finance and public credit ==
No.	Minister	Took office	Left office	Ref
1	Aristóbulo Archila	15 February 1923	1 December 1924	
2	Jesús María Marulanda Sonsón	18 December 1924	7 August 1926	
3	Juan Antonio Gómez Recuero	7 August 1926	3 January 1927	
4	Salvador Franco	12 January 1927	17 May 1927	
5	Jesús María Esteban Jaramillo Gutiérrez	17 May 1927	18 January 1929	
6	Francisco de Paula Pérez Tamayo	18 January 1929	1 April 1930	
7	Eduardo Vallejo Varela	12 April 1930	7 August 1930	
8	Francisco de Paula Pérez Tamayo	7 August 1930	28 July 1931	
9	Jesús María Marulanda Sonsón	28 July 1931	9 October 1931	
10	Jesús María Esteban Jaramillo Gutiérrez	27 November 1931	7 August 1934	
11	Carlos Echeverri Uribe	7 August 1934	13 August 1934	
12	Marco Aulí	13 August 1934	25 September 1934	
13	Jorge Soto del Corral	26 October 1934	4 April 1936	
14	Gonzalo Restrepo Jaramillo	4 April 1936	27 March 1937	
15	José Joaquín Castro Martínez	27 March 1937	4 June 1937	
16	Gonzalo Restrepo Jaramillo	4 June 1937	2 April 1938	
17	Héctor José Vargas	2 April 1938	7 August 1938	
18	Carlos Lleras Restrepo	7 August 1938	24 March 1941	
19	Gonzalo Restrepo Jaramillo	3 April 1941	26 August 1941	
20	Carlos Lleras Restrepo	26 August 1941	7 August 1942	
21	Alfonso Araújo Gaviria	7 August 1942	23 August 1943	
22	Arcesio Londoño Palacio	23 August 1943	8 October 1943	
23	Carlos Lleras Restrepo	8 October 1943	6 March 1944	
24	Gonzalo Restrepo Jaramillo	6 March 1944	19 January 1945	
25	Roberto Urdaneta Arbeláez	30 March 1945	9 April 1945	
26	Carlos Sanz de Santamaría	9 April 1945	13 August 1945	
27	Francisco de Paula Pérez Tamayo	9 September 1945	27 October 1947	
28	José María Bernal Bernal	27 October 1947	7 March 1949	
29	Hernán Jaramillo Ocampo	7 March 1949	7 August 1950	
30	Rafael Delgado Barreneche	7 August 1950	2 February 1951	
31	Antonio Álvarez Restrepo	2 February 1951	13 June 1953	
32	Carlos Villaveces Restrepo	13 June 1953	19 September 1956	
33	Néstor Ibarra Yáñez	19 September 1956	4 October 1956	
34	Luis Morales Gómez	4 October 1956	11 May 1957	
35	Antonio Álvarez Restrepo	11 May 1957	18 December 1957	
36	Jesús María Marulanda Sonsón	18 December 1957	7 August 1958	
37	Hernando Agudelo Villa	7 August 1958	1 September 1961	
38	Misael Pastrana Borrero	1 September 1961	16 November 1961	
39	Jorge Mejía Palacio	16 November 1961	7 August 1962	
40	Virgilio Barco Vargas	7 August 1962	5 September 1962	
41	Carlos Sanz de Santamaría	5 September 1962	21 February 1964	
42	Diego Calle Restrepo	21 February 1964	6 August 1964	
43	Hernando Durán Dussán	6 August 1964	23 June 1965	
44	Joaquín Vallejo Arbeláez	14 July 1965	7 August 1966	
45	Abdón Espinosa Valderrama	7 August 1966	7 August 1970	
46	Alfonso Patiño Rosselli	7 August 1970	9 June 1971	
47	Rodrigo Llorente Martínez	9 June 1971	13 April 1973	
48	Luis Fernando Echavarría Vélez	13 April 1973	7 August 1974	
49	Rodrigo Botero Montoya	7 August 1974	23 December 1976	
50	Abdón Espinosa Valderrama	23 December 1976	3 October 1977	
51	Alfonso Palacio Rudas	3 October 1977	7 August 1978	
52	Jaime García Parra	7 August 1978	13 January 1981	
53	Eduardo Wiesner Durán	13 January 1981	7 August 1982	
54	Edgar Gutiérrez Castro	7 August 1982	July 1984	
55	Roberto Junguito	July 1984	September 1985	
56	Hugo Palacios Mejía	September 1985	7 August 1986	
57	César Gaviria Trujillo	7 August 1986	17 June 1987	
58	Luis Fernando Alarcón Mantilla	17 June 1987	7 August 1990	
59	Rudolf Hommes Rodríguez	7 August 1990	7 August 1994	
60	Guillermo Perry Rubio	7 August 1994	3 May 1996	
61	José Antonio Ocampo	3 May 1996	24 November 1997	
62	Antonio José Urdinola Uribe	24 November 1997	7 August 1998	
63	Juan Camilo Restrepo Salazar	7 August 1998	7 August 2000	
64	Juan Manuel Santos Calderón	18 July 2000	7 August 2002	
65	Roberto Junguito	7 August 2002	7 June 2003	
66	Alberto Carrasquilla Barrera	20 June 2003	7 March 2007	
67	Óscar Iván Zuluaga Escobar	7 March 2007	7 August 2010	
68	Juan Carlos Echeverry Garzón	7 August 2010	3 September 2012	
69	Mauricio Cárdenas Santa María	3 September 2012	7 August 2018	
70	Alberto Carrasquilla Barrera	7 August 2018	3 May 2021	
71	José Manuel Restrepo Abondano	3 May 2021	7 August 2022	
72	José Antonio Ocampo	7 August 2022	26 April 2023	
73	Richard Bonilla	1 May 2023	7 August 2026	
