= 2002 Colombian presidential election =

- 26 May 2002
- Turnout: 46.47% (▼5.08pp)
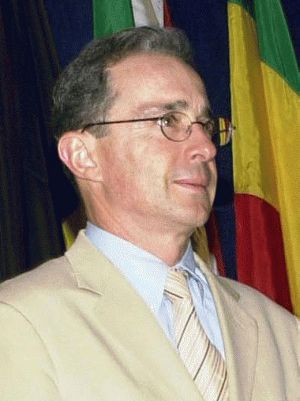

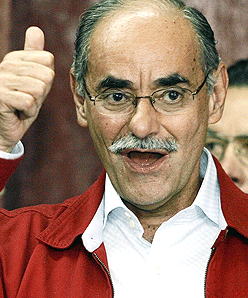

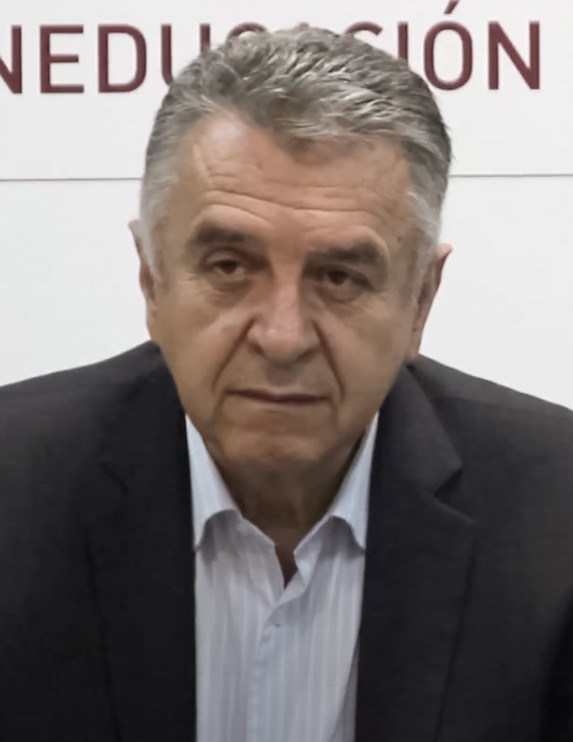

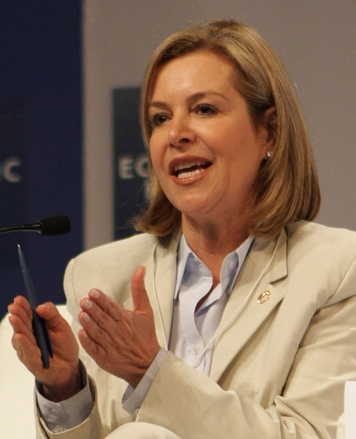
Nominee	Álvaro Uribe	Horacio Serpa
Party	Colombia First	Liberal
Running mate	Francisco Santos Calderón	José Gregorio Hernández Galindo
Popular vote	5,862,655	3,514,779
Percentage	53.05%	31.80%
Nominee	Luis Eduardo Garzón	Noemí Sanín
Party	PDI	Yes Colombia
Running mate	Vera Grabe	Fabio Villegas Ramírez
Popular vote	680,245	641,884
Percentage	6.16%	5.81%
- Results by municipality
President before election
Andrés Pastrana Arango
Conservative
Elected President
Álvaro Uribe
Colombia First

Presidential elections were held in Colombia on 26 May 2002. Álvaro Uribe, the candidate of the recently created Colombia First movement, was elected, receiving 53% of the vote by the first round. Uribe took office on 7 August.

== Background ==
In the 1998 presidential elections, Andrés Pastrana of the Colombian Conservative Party was elected to the presidency on a platform of holding peace negotiations with the Revolutionary Armed Forces of Colombia (FARC) guerrillas. After over three years of tortuous dialogue – while the conflict continued unabated in the rest of the country – Pastrana announced on 20 February 2002 that he was ending the peace process with the FARC. During this complicated period, public opinion radicalized in favour of a strong military strategy to end the Colombian armed conflict.

== Candidates ==
=== Conservative Party ===
In 2001 the governing coalition – composed of the Conservative Party and dissident Liberals – which had carried Pastrana to the presidency in 1998 began looking for a candidate to carry the coalition into the 2002 elections. Former Vice President and Minister of the Interior Humberto de La Calle, a dissident Liberal, was approached but he declined, arguing that the candidacy should go to a Conservative. The Minister of Economic Development, Augusto Ramírez Ocampo, resigned his portfolio to seek the presidency, but he later failed to obtain Conservative support because of his low support in the polls.

Following Ramírez Ocampo's withdrawal, the party's president, Carlos Holguín Sardi organized an internal consultation among the over 16,000 delegates in the national convention. Some members of the party wished to offer the candidacy to Noemí Sanín (a former Conservative who had run as an independent in the 1998 election, placing third in the first round), but she declined, opting to continue her independent candidacy. As a result, her supporters within the party's ranks decided not to participate in the internal consultation and join her campaign directly. Three candidates registered to participate in the Conservative primary, the favourite and eventual winner by a large margin was Juan Camilo Restrepo. Restrepo, who had lost the 1998 Conservative candidacy to Pastrana, had later served in Pastrana's cabinet as Minister of Finance (1998-2000), where his austere measures against the economic crisis made him unpopular and led to his appointment as Colombia's ambassador to France. With most of the Conservative party ultimately supporting Uribe, Restrepo withdrew from the race.

=== Liberal Party ===
The official candidate of the Liberal Party was Horacio Serpa, who had already been the party's candidate in the 1998 election. Despite being a polarizing figure, Serpa entered the election as the favourite.

=== Álvaro Uribe's independent candidacy ===
Álvaro Uribe, the former Liberal governor of Antioquia (1995-1997), entered the race as a strong opponent of the peace talks with the FARC, but originally suffered from low name recognition against other better-known candidates. Uribe declined to participate in a Liberal primary, citing the lack of guarantees, and instead launched an independent candidacy (by collecting signatures from voters to win ballot access) with the backing of the Colombia First (Primero Colombia) movement.

Uribe entered the field taking a hardline position against the peace talks with the FARC, arguing that peace talks should only be held following the cessation of hostilities and terrorist actions.

=== The left ===
Luis Eduardo Garzón, the first president of the Central Union of Workers between 1990 and 2001, ran as the candidate of the left-wing Social and Political Front, later joined by other left-wing parties including the ANAPO and united under the name Independent Democratic Pole. His candidacy received a major boost following the left's good results in the March 2002 congressional elections.

== Campaign ==
With public opinion having turned against the continuation of peace talks with the guerrilla, Uribe saw his support in the polls increase at a consistent pace. He broke through, surpassing Serpa, beginning in February 2002, following President Pastrana's announcement that he was ending the peace process.

The shift in the polls led a number of Conservatives to abandon their party's official candidate and join Uribe. Decrying the lack of support for his candidacy, Juan Camilo Restrepo dropped out and the Conservative Party chose to officially endorse Uribe. Uribe also received the support of a number of other small parties and movements, including Radical Change, senator Germán Vargas Lleras' Colombia Siempre, the National Salvation Movement and Team Colombia.

== Opinion polls ==
Date	Polling Firm/Source	Uribe (L. diss.)	Serpa (L)	Garzón (PDI)	Sanín	Oth.	Lead
18–23 May	Napoleón Franco	48.2	27.4	8.2	6.1	10.1	20.8
12–14 May	Napoleón Franco	49.3	23	7.8	6	13.9	26.3
18-23 Apr	Napoleón Franco	47.6	27.4	7	6.5	11.5	20.2
1-2 Apr	Caracol-El Espectador-Cambio	51	29	4	7	9	22
20-23 Mar	Serpa internal	49	31	4	7	9	18
26 Feb-5 Mar	Uribe internal	54	24	3	8	11	30
21-24 Feb	Napoleón Franco	59.5	24	1.2	5.1	2.2	35.5
4 Feb	Napoleón Franco	53	24		12	11	29
19-25 Jan 2002	Napoleón Franco	39	30.1	0.9	16.9	13.1	8.9
19-22 Sep 2001	Napoleón Franco	23.4	41.2		16.2	19.2	17.8

== Results ==
Candidate	Running mate	Party	Votes	%
Álvaro Uribe	Francisco Santos	Colombia First	5,862,655	53.05
Horacio Serpa	José Gregorio Hernández	Colombian Liberal Party	3,514,779	31.80
Luis Eduardo Garzón	Vera Grabe	Independent Democratic Pole	680,245	6.16
Noemí Sanín	Fabio Villegas	Yes Colombia	641,884	5.81
Íngrid Betancourt	Clara Leticia Rojas	Oxygen Green Party	53,922	0.49
Harold Bedoya Pizarro	Marino Jaramillo	Force Colombia	50,763	0.46
Francisco Tovar	Ricardo Díaz	Civic Defence Movement	16,333	0.15
Augusto Guillermo Lora	Germán Rojas	19th of April Movement	10,987	0.10
Álvaro Cristancho	Manuel Enrique Delgado	Common Participation Movement	9,627	0.09
Guillermo Antonio Cardona	Hernán Bernal	Colombian Community and Communal Political Movement	8,023	0.07
Rodolfo Rincón	Donaldo Escorcia	Community Participation	6,311	0.06
Blank votes			196,116	1.77
Total			11,051,645	100.00
Valid votes			11,051,645	98.24
Invalid votes			198,089	1.76
Total votes			11,249,734	100.00
Registered voters/turnout			24,208,311	46.47
Source: RNEC
