= Gustavo Bell =

Colombian politician, lawyer, economist and diplomat

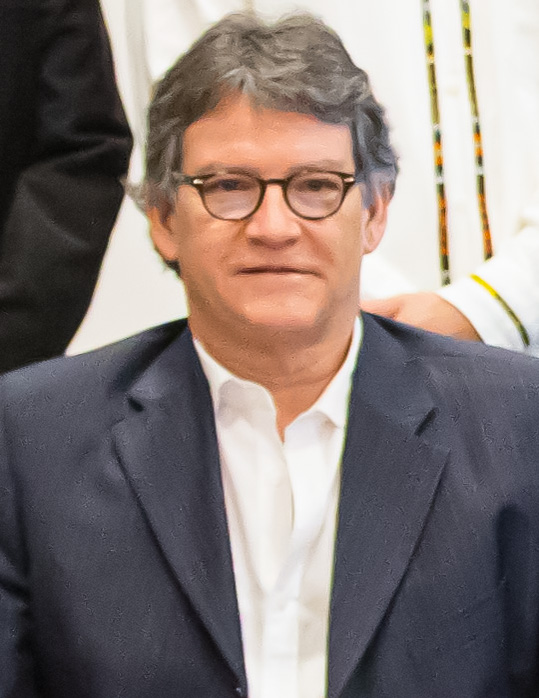
- Gustavo Bell in 2018

7th Vice President of Colombia
- In office 7 August 1998 – 7 August 2002
- President: Andrés Pastrana Arango
- Preceded by: Carlos Lemos Simmonds
- Succeeded by: Francisco Santos Calderón

Colombian Ambassador to Cuba
- In office 7 March 2011 – 19 March 2017
- President: Juan Manuel Santos
- Preceded by: Julio Londoño Paredes
- Succeeded by: Araceli Morales López

Minister of National Defence
- In office 11 June 2001 – 7 August 2002
- President: Andrés Pastrana Arango
- Preceded by: Luis Fernando Ramírez
- Succeeded by: Marta Lucía Ramírez

53rd Governor of Atlántico
- In office 1 January 1992 – 31 December 1993
- Preceded by: Arnold Gómez Mendoza
- Succeeded by: Nelson Polo Hernández

Personal details
- Born: Gustavo Adolfo Bell Lemus; 1 February 1957 (age 69) Barranquilla, Atlántico, Colombia
- Party: Conservative
- Other political affiliations: Great Alliance for Change (1998)
- Spouse: María Mercedes de la Espriella
- Children: María Alexandra Bell de la Espriella
- Education: Pontifical Xavierian University (LLB, MSc); St Antony's College, Oxford (PhD)
- Profession: Lawyer, Economist, Historian

Gustavo Adolfo Bell Lemus (born 1 February 1957) is a Colombian politician, lawyer, economist and diplomat who served as vice president of Colombia from 1998 to 2002 under the administration of Andrés Pastrana Arango, during which time he also served concurrently as High Commissioner for Human Rights of Colombia and as Minister of National Defence between 2001 and 2002. He also served as the Colombian ambassador to Cuba from 2011 to 2017. In 1992, as the 53rd governor of Atlántico, he became the first popularly elected governor of the department following the enactment of the 1991 Colombian Constitution.

== Career ==
=== Education ===
Bell attended the Pontifical Xavierian University where he obtained a double degree in laws and socioeconomics. He completed graduate studies at the University of the Andes on a Constitutional Bicentenary scholarship from the Bank of the Republic [Colombia], the Escuela de Estudios Hispano-Americanos at Seville on a research scholarship from Spain's Ministry of Foreign Affairs and Cooperation, and St Antony's College, Oxford on a British Council scholarship, where he also obtained a Ph.D. in modern history.

In addition to his academic studies, Bell was one of the founding members and part of the faculty of the University of the North in Barranquilla.

=== Journalism ===
Bell began his work in journalism in El Heraldo, and quickly rose to become one of the most influential journalists in northern Colombia. While working as Executive Editor of El Heraldo, Bell suffered an assassination attempt but escaped unharmed.

=== Governorship ===
In 1991 Bell run for governor of the Atlántico Department as an independent candidate, he became the first elected governor by popular vote of this department for the period between 1992 and 1994. (governors in Colombia were appointed by the president before the constitution of 1991)

=== Vice presidency (1998–2002) ===
After spending three years studying in the United Kingdom, Bell returned to Colombia in 1997 and joined the presidential campaign of Andrés Pastrana. Pastrana offered him the vice presidency of Colombia, and they were elected for the 1998–2002 presidential period.

Vice President Bell was in charge of the Colombian Office for Human Rights issues between 1998 and 2001, year in which President Pastrana also appointed him the Ministry of National Defence.

=== Ambassadorship ===
On 29 October 2010, President Juan Manuel Santos Calderón designated Bell to be Ambassador Extraordinary and Plenipotentiary of Colombia to the Republic of Cuba stating "I think [a] better ambassador to Cuba would not be found. We want to maintain a special relationship with Cuba and therefore we will send an ambassador of high carat, as Dr. Bell". On 7 March 2011, Bell was sworn in by President Santos as Ambassador to Cuba in a ceremony at the Casa de Nariño. Bell served as ambassador until 2017 and was succeeded by Araceli Morales López.

== Personal life ==
Bell was married to María Mercedes De La Espriella and has one daughter named María Alexandra.

Diplomatic posts
Preceded by Julio Londoño Paredes	Colombian Ambassador to Cuba; 2011–2017	Succeeded by Araceli Morales López
Political offices
Preceded by Carlos Lemos Simmonds	Vice President of Colombia; 1998–2002	Succeeded by Francisco Santos Calderón
Preceded by Luis Fernando Ramírez	Minister of National Defence; 2001–2002	Succeeded by Marta Lucía Ramírez
Preceded by Arnold Gómez Mendoza	Governor of Atlántico; 1992–1993	Succeeded by Nelson Polo Hernández
Party political offices
Preceded by Luis Fernando Ramírez	Conservative nominee for Vice President of Colombia; 1998	Succeeded by Francisco Santos Calderón
Order of precedence
Preceded by Humberto De la Calle as former vice president	Order of precedence of Colombia former vice president	Succeeded by Francisco Santos Calderón as former vice president
