= Carlos Eduardo Medellín Becerra =

Colombian lawyer and diplomat

27th Colombia Ambassador to the United Kingdom
- In office 7 December 2006 – 19 November 2007
- President: Álvaro Uribe Vélez
- Preceded by: Alfonso López Caballero
- Succeeded by: Noemí Sanín Posada

3rd Minister of Justice and Law of Colombia
- In office 11 January 1996 – 21 April 1997
- President: Ernesto Samper Pizano
- Preceded by: Néstor Humberto Martínez Neira
- Succeeded by: Almabeatriz Rengifo López

Personal details
- Born: 14 September 1962 (age 64) Bogotá, D.C., Colombia
- Spouse: María José Cano Busquets
- Children: María José Medellín Cano; Adriana Medellín Cano; Carlos Medellín Cano
- Education: Universidad Externado de Colombia; Panthéon-Assas University
- Profession: Lawyer

Carlos Eduardo Medellín Becerra (born 14 September 1962) is a Colombian lawyer and diplomat and has served as Minister of Justice of Colombia and as Ambassador of Colombia to the United Kingdom.

== Life and career ==
Carlos Eduardo (born 14 September 1962), son of Carlos Medellín Forero and Susana Becerra Álvarez. His father was a judge for Colombia's Supreme Justice Court and was taken hostage in the Palace of Justice siege in 1985 and was allegedly killed by M-19 guerilla members. He is married to María José Cano Busquets, daughter of famous journalist Guillermo Cano Isaza ex director of the newspaper El Espectador. Together they have three children, María José, Adriana and Carlos. At the moment he litigates in different law areas, especially in public law. He is partner in the law firm Medellín & Durán Abogados, which he also founded in 2010 in Bogotá, Colombia. He is an arbitrator for the Camara de Comercio de Bogotá. He is also an associate judge for Cundinamarca's Administrivia's Court, also for the Consejo de Estado. Member of the Academia Colombiana de Jurisprudencia and he is a professor of Roman Law and other law areas.

=== Studies ===
He attended Colegio Claustro Moderno, a private primary and secondary school. He went to law school at Universidad Externado de Colombia. After he graduated, he then attended Universidad Nacional and made a specialization in Public Law. He then did a specialization on public law in Panthéon-Assas University.

=== Law professor ===
He has been a professor of Roman Law for more than 30 years in the Universidad del Rosario. He also taught Roman Law in the Universidad de la Sabana. He also dictates a subject called "Acciones Populares y de Grupo" more known in Colombia as class action lawsuits, in the Universidad Externado de Colombia. He also taught Constitutional Law in universities like the Colegio de Estudios Mayores de Administración (CESA) and the Universidad de America. He is also a professor of philosophy, political ideas and history in Colegio Claustro Moderno.

=== Books ===
He has worked on updating the Roman Law book named "Lecciones de Derecho Romano", which is now on its seventeenth edition. Another one of his books is "La interpretatio iuris y los principios generales del derecho. Corte Constitucional, Consejo de Estado, Corte Suprema de Justicia y Jurisdicción Especial para la Paz. 1991-2022".

=== Medellín & Durán lawyers ===
In 2010, he partnered with Rodrigo Durán Bustos, another Colombian lawyer to start a public law firm named Medellín & Durán Abogados. Although the firm specialized in public law, it has also had cases of other law areas like constitutional law, state contracting, cadastral law, disciplinary law, and fiscal responsibility. The firm was named member of the American Bar Association (ABA) in 2021, and in 2022 was ranked by Chambers and Partners as one of the best Latin-American public law firms. In 2023, Medellín was also ranked by Chambers and Partners as one of the best public lawyers in Latin America.

== Political life ==
=== Minister of justice and law ===
Medellín was appointed Minister of Justice and Law of Colombia by President Ernesto Samper Pizano on 11 January 1996, replacing Néstor Humberto Martínez Neira. As minister of justice and law he settled the domain extinction law or "Ley de extinción y dominio" which was made to economically punish drug dealers who acquired estates or other things in their patrimony in an illicit way or through drug money. The law implied that in case there was a condemnatory sentence, the government would become the owner of the things acquired by drug money or in an illegal way.

Not long after, Medellín recused himself from handling a case pertaining to the Palace of Justice siege because of the personal connection to the case, since his father was a fatal victim of the siege. The Minister of the Interior, Horacio Serpa Uribe, was therefore named Minister of Justice ad hoc.

He was ultimately forced to resign on 21 April 1997 because he was an open supporter not only of opening up the debate for an extradition treaty with the United States, but also of having it implemented retroactively, something both the President and the Minister of the Interior were completely against, and ultimately leading to incompatibility with the Samper administration.

=== Ambassadorship ===
On 7 December 2006, Medellín was appointed Ambassador of Colombia to the United Kingdom of Great Britain and Northern Ireland, and Concurrent Non-Resident Ambassador to the Republic of Ireland, and presented his credentials to Queen Elizabeth II in a ceremony at Buckingham Palace on 2 March 2007.

While in office, Guillermo Fernández de Soto, Colombia's Ambassador to the Netherlands resigned, and President Uribe moved quickly to appoint Medellín as new Ambassador pending his return to Colombia to be sworn in, so on 19 November 2007, Medellín resigned his post and returned to Colombia. His nomination for Ambassador to The Hague was a matter of great importance, given the case at the Permanent Court of Arbitration on the sovereignty claims of Colombia over the Archipelago of San Andrés, Providencia and Santa Catalina after Nicaragua presented a dispute case over the territory, and the President believed Medellín's law background would help Colombia's cause in court. But suddenly, latter that month, Medellín turned down both Ambassadorships, when an article in El Espectador revealed that Carlos Alberto Gaviria Vélez, older brother of José Obdulio Gaviria Vélez (cousin of Pablo Escobar), who was an Advisor to President Uribe, was directly involved with Luis Carlos Molina Yepes, the moneyman involved in planning the assassination of Guillermo Cano Isaza, Medellín's father-in-law. His resignation was coupled with an earlier one from the Anticorruption Czar, Rodrigo Lara Restrepo, who resigned because José Obdulio Gaviria Vélez had deliberately lied to him about an article published by the Miami based El Nuevo Herald, where they discussed the death of his father, Rodrigo Lara Bonilla. The result of the resignations, both linked to the President's advisor, created a political storm in Colombia.
