= 2010 Colombian presidential election =

- 30 May 2010 (first round); 20 June 2010 (second round)
- Turnout: 49.30% (first round) ▲4.25pp 44.35% (second round) ▼14.41pp
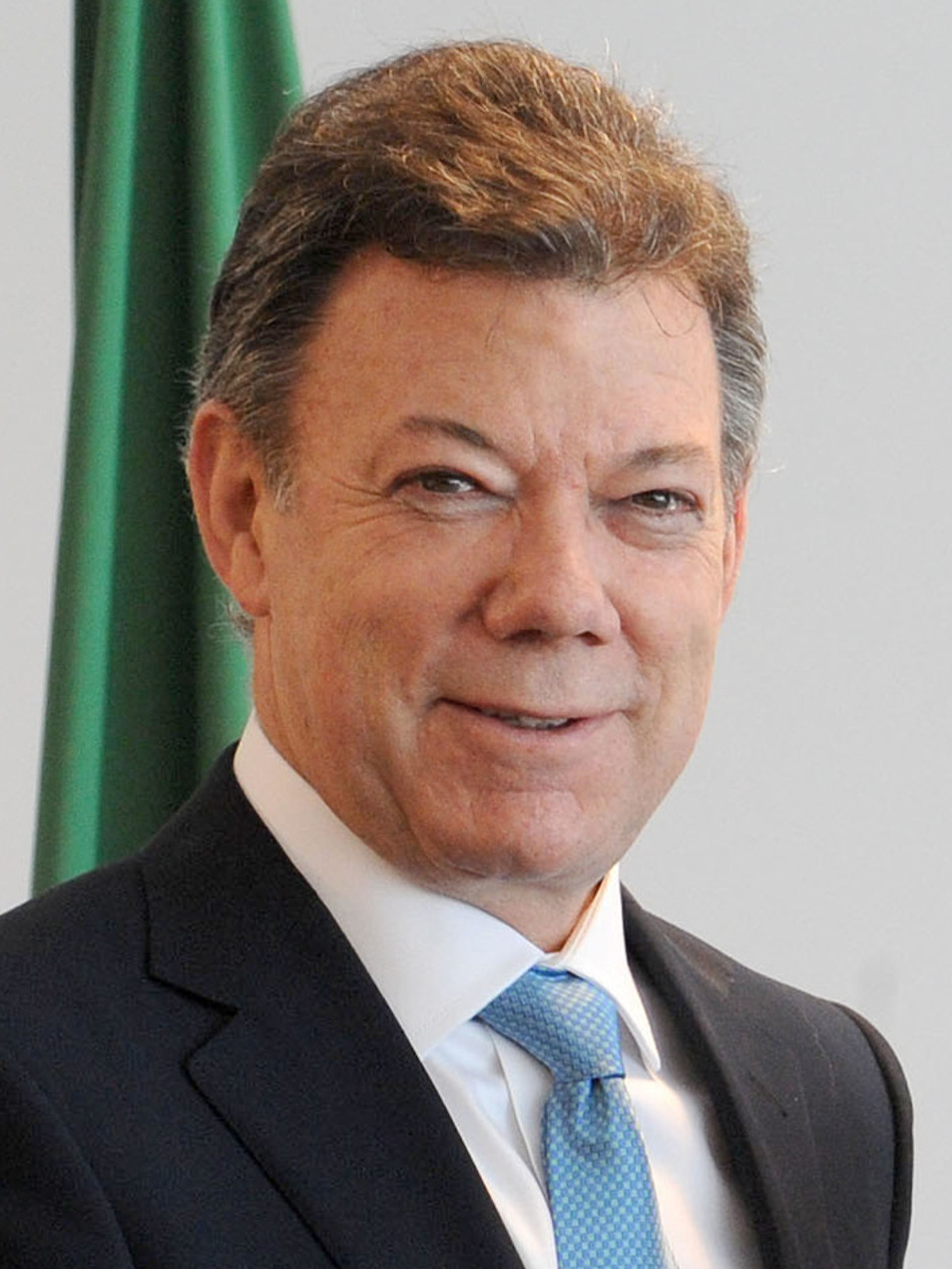

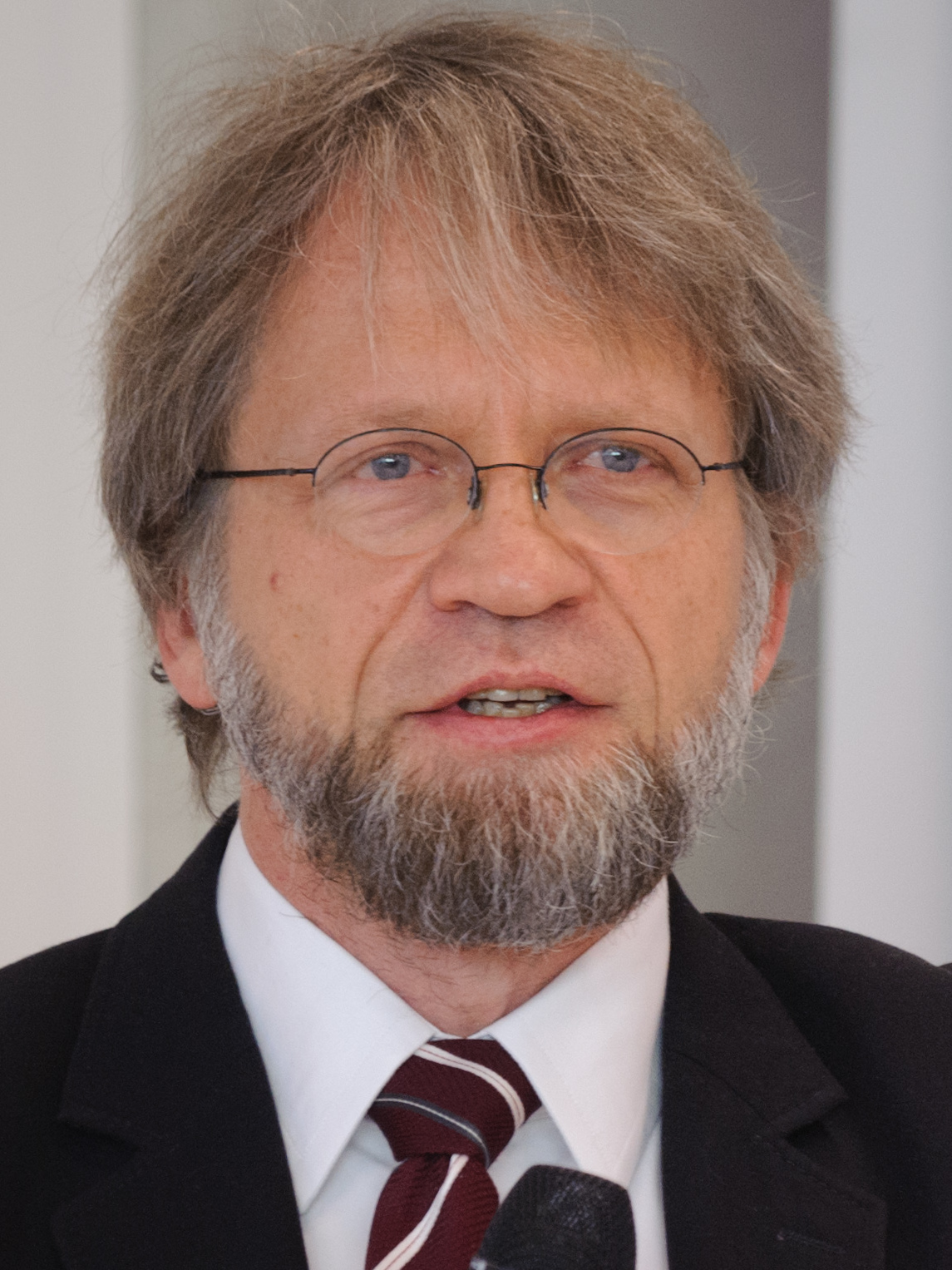
Nominee	Juan Manuel Santos	Antanas Mockus
Party	Party of the U	Green Party
Running mate	Angelino Garzón	Sergio Fajardo
Popular vote	9,028,943	3,587,975
Percentage	69.13%	27.47%
President before election
Álvaro Uribe
Colombia First
Elected President
Juan Manuel Santos
Party of the U

Presidential elections were held in Colombia in 2010. They took place under a two-round system, with an initial vote held on 30 May and a second poll held three weeks later on 20 June. A referendum proposal that would have allowed incumbent President Álvaro Uribe the opportunity to run for a third term was rejected by the Constitutional Court of Colombia in a 7–2 ruling on 26 February 2010.

Because no candidate received a majority (more than one-half) of the votes cast in the 30 May poll, the candidates with the two highest vote totals competed in a runoff election on 20 June: Juan Manuel Santos of the liberal-conservative Social Party of National Unity which unites supporters of former President Uribe, and Antanas Mockus from the Green Party. Santos won the election with 69% of the vote.

== Candidates ==
=== Government group ===
In 2002, Álvaro Uribe of the Colombia First party was elected President of Colombia with 53.1 per cent of the vote, breaking the two-party system that ruled the country since 1958, with the promise of ending the armed conflict that haunts the country since 1964 by strengthening the Armed Forces. In 2006, he managed to change the Constitution in order to run for a second consecutive term. After a practically mute campaign, Uribe won the election with 62.2 per cent of the vote, followed by Carlos Gaviria of the Alternative Democratic Pole with a distant 22 per cent.

In 2007, Luis Guillermo Giraldo, leader of the pro-Uribe Party of the U, announced he would create the "promoters' committee", a group charged with gathering signatures to call a referendum on whether Uribe should be allowed to run for a third term in office. In September 2009, Congress approved the referendum bill in a late-night voting boycotted by members of the opposition. On 26 February 2010, the Constitutional Court voted against the referendum bill. Immediately after the ruling, former defence minister Juan Manuel Santos confirmed that he would become a presidential candidate. Another Uribist candidate was Germán Vargas Lleras of the Radical Change party. Former Colombian ambassador to the United Kingdom, Noemí Sanín, and former agriculture minister Andrés Felipe Arias, two of the closest Uribe allies, were seeking nomination by the Conservative Party. Sanín was nominated.

=== Opposition group ===
Two of the opposition candidates were Rafael Pardo of the Liberal Party and Gustavo Petro of the Alternative Democratic Pole. Álvaro Leyva, a Uribe opponent, was seeking the presidential nomination by the Conservative Party. On 2 October 2009, the Green Party was officially created. It nominated its presidential candidate on a primary ballot that took place on 14 March 2010, the same day as the legislative election. The contenders were three former Bogotá mayors: Enrique Peñalosa, Antanas Mockus, and Luis Eduardo Garzón. The Greens seek to be a moderate force in what they called "a polarized" political situation, calling themselves "post-Uribists". Mockus was chosen as their candidate. Former Medellín mayor Sergio Fajardo joined him as his running mate on 5 April 2010, after missing the requirements to become a presidential candidate himself.

== Opinion polls ==
=== First round ===
Date	Institute	Candidate										Undecided (Ns/Nr) V. None	Source
Date	Institute	Rafael Pardo	Gustavo Petro	Germán Vargas Lleras	Sergio Fajardo	Juan Manuel Santos	Antanas Mockus	Noemí Sanín	Róbinson Devia	Jaime Araújo	Jairo Calderón	Undecided (Ns/Nr) V. None	Source
24 March 2010	Invamer Gallup	5.1%	6.3%	6.2%	6.1%	34.2%	10.4%	23.3%	0%	0%	0%	8.4%	
26 March 2010	Datexco	5.5%	7.1%	6.6%	4.4%	34.1%	8.9%	21.7%	0%	0.2%	0.1%	11.4%	
27 March 2010	Ipsos Napoleón Franco	4%	6%	8%	5%	36%	9%	17%	1%	0%	0%	14%	
27 March 2010	Centro Nacional de Consultoría	3.4%	3.6%	6.5%	3.6%	28.6%	11.3%	21.9%	0%	0%	0%	21.1%	
8 April 2010	Centro Nacional de Consultoría	5%	6%	3%	-	37%	22%	20%	0%	0%	0%	7%	
9 April 2010	Datexco	5.2%	3.1%	3%	-	29.5%	24.8%	16.4%	0%	0%	0%	17.2%	
15 April 2010	Centro Nacional de Consultoría	4%	4%	2%	-	36%	29%	19%	0%	1%	0%	5%	
16 April 2010	Ipsos Napoleón Franco	5%	4%	3%	-	30%	20%	12%	1%	5%	5%	15%	
22 April 2010	Centro Nacional de Consultoría	5%	5%	4%	-	35%	34%	12%	0%	1%	0%	3%	
26 April 2010	Ipsos Napoleón Franco	3%	5%	3%	-	29%	38%	11%	0%	1%	0%	10%	
28 April 2010	Invamer Gallup	5.7%	5.0%	3.6%	-	34.2%	31.6%	16.2%	0%	0.1%	0%	3.5%	
29 April 2010	Centro Nacional de Consultoría	3%	5%	4%	-	34%	39%	11%	0%	0%	0%	4%	
30 April 2010	Datexco	2.3%	2.9%	3.3%	-	26.7%	38.7%	9.8%	0%	0%	0%	16.3%	
6 May 2010	Centro Nacional de Consultoría	3%	5%	5%	-	34%	38%	11%	0%	0%	0%	4%	
7 May 2010	Datexco	1.4%	4.2%	3.1%	-	25.2%	37.7%	6.7%	0%	0%	0%	21.7%	
9 May 2010	Ipsos Napoleón Franco	4%	4%	3%	-	35%	34%	8%	0%	0%	0%	12%	
13 May 2010	Centro Nacional de Consultoría	3%	4%	4%	-	38%	36%	9%	0%	0%	0%	6%	
14 May 2010	Datexco	3.1%	7.5%	4.3%	-	29.3%	32.8%	5.6%	0%	0.4%	0%	13.8%	
19 May 2010	Invamer Gallup	3.8%	7.3%	3.8%	-	37.5%	35.4%	8.8%	0.1%	0.2%	0%	3.1%	
20 May 2010	University of Medellin	2.4%	5.5%	3.6%	-	32.9%	37.4%	8.1%	0.4%	0.2%	0.1%	6.9%	
20 May 2010	Centro Nacional De Consultoría	4%	5%	4%	-	39%	34%	9%	0%	0%	0%	4%	
21 May 2010	Datexco	2%	5%	3%	-	35%	34%	9%	0%	0%	0%	12%	
22 May 2010	Ipsos Napoleón Franco	3%	6%	5%	-	34%	32%	6%	0%	0%	0%	14%	

=== Second round: Mockus vs. Santos ===
Date	Institute	Candidate		Undecided (Ns/Nr) V. None	Source
Date	Institute	Juan Manuel Santos	Antanas Mockus	Undecided (Ns/Nr) V. None	Source
15 April 2010	Centro Nacional de Consultoría	49%	44%	7%	
16 April 2010	Ipsos Napoleón Franco	45%	37%	18%	
22 April 2010	Centro Nacional de Consultoría	44%	50%	6%	
26 April 2010	Ipsos Napoleón Franco	37%	50%	13%	
28 April 2010	Invamer Gallup	42.2%	47.9%	9.9%	
29 April 2010	Centro Nacional de Consultoría	42%	53%	5%	
30 April 2010	Datexco	29%	41.5%	29.5%	
6 May 2010	Centro Nacional de Consultoría	43%	50%	7%	
7 May 2010	Datexco	30.5%	52%	17.5%	
9 May 2010	Ipsos Napoleón Franco	41%	48%	11%	
13 May 2010	Centro Nacional de Consultoría	47%	47%	6%	
14 May 2010	Datexco	33.6%	47.9%	17.5%	
May 19, 2010	Invamer Gallup	42.2%	48.5%	9.3%	
20 May 2010	University of Medellin	36%	41.4%	22.6%	
20 May 2010	Centro Nacional de Consultoría	47%	46%	7%	
21 May 2010	Datexco	44%	45%	11%	
22 May 2010	Ipsos Napoleón Franco	40%	45%	15%	
3 June 2010	Centro Nacional de Consultoría	61.6%	29.8%	5.8%	

== Conduct ==
On election day seven Colombian security services personnel were killed and eight were missing; parallels were drawn with FARC attacks and Santos' tenure as Defense Minister.

== Results ==
No candidate received an outright majority in the first round vote held on 30 May. Santos and Mockus faced one another in the runoff election on 20 June, leading to the election of Juan Manuel Santos as the next Colombian President. Santos achieved a landslide victory, with 69 per cent of the votes. Mockus got 27.51 per cent of votes. This was the largest margin of victory for a president in the democratic period of Colombia's history. Santos won 32 of the country's 33 electoral districts. His allies have an overwhelming majority in the Colombian Congress. Santos vowed to continue his predecessor's hardline stance against the country's Marxist rebels. He paraphrased Isaac Newton – "If we have come far it's because we are standing on the shoulders of giants" – and said he would rid Colombia of what he described as the "nightmare of violence". The United States State Department said it was "pleased" with the election of Santos and praised the "spirited debate" before the runoff and Colombia's "longstanding commitment to democratic principles".

Candidate	Running mate	Party	First round		Second round	
Candidate	Running mate	Party	Votes	%	Votes	%
Juan Manuel Santos	Angelino Garzón	Social Party of National Unity	6,802,043	46.68	9,028,943	69.13
Antanas Mockus	Sergio Fajardo	Green Party	3,134,222	21.51	3,587,975	27.47
Germán Vargas Lleras	Elsa Noguera	Radical Change	1,473,627	10.11		
Gustavo Petro	Clara López	Alternative Democratic Pole	1,331,267	9.14		
Noemí Sanín	Luis Ernesto Mejía	Colombian Conservative Party	893,819	6.13		
Rafael Pardo	Aníbal Gaviria	Colombian Liberal Party	638,302	4.38		
Róbinson Devia	Olga Lucía Taborda	Voice of Conscience Movement	31,338	0.22		
Jairo Calderón	Jobanny Burbano	Liberal Opening Movement	29,151	0.20		
Jaime Araújo	Ana María Cabal	Afro-Colombian Social Alliance	14,847	0.10		
Blank votes			223,977	1.54	444,274	3.40
Total			14,572,593	100.00	13,061,192	100.00
Valid votes			14,572,593	98.59	13,061,192	98.23
Invalid votes			208,427	1.41	235,732	1.77
Total votes			14,781,020	100.00	13,296,924	100.00
Registered voters/turnout			29,983,279	49.30	29,983,279	44.35
Source: RNEC, RNEC, IFES, IFES

== See also ==
- Chameleon Operation (Colombia)
