= Antanas Mockus =

Colombian politician and educator (born 1952)

Antanas Mockus Šivickas
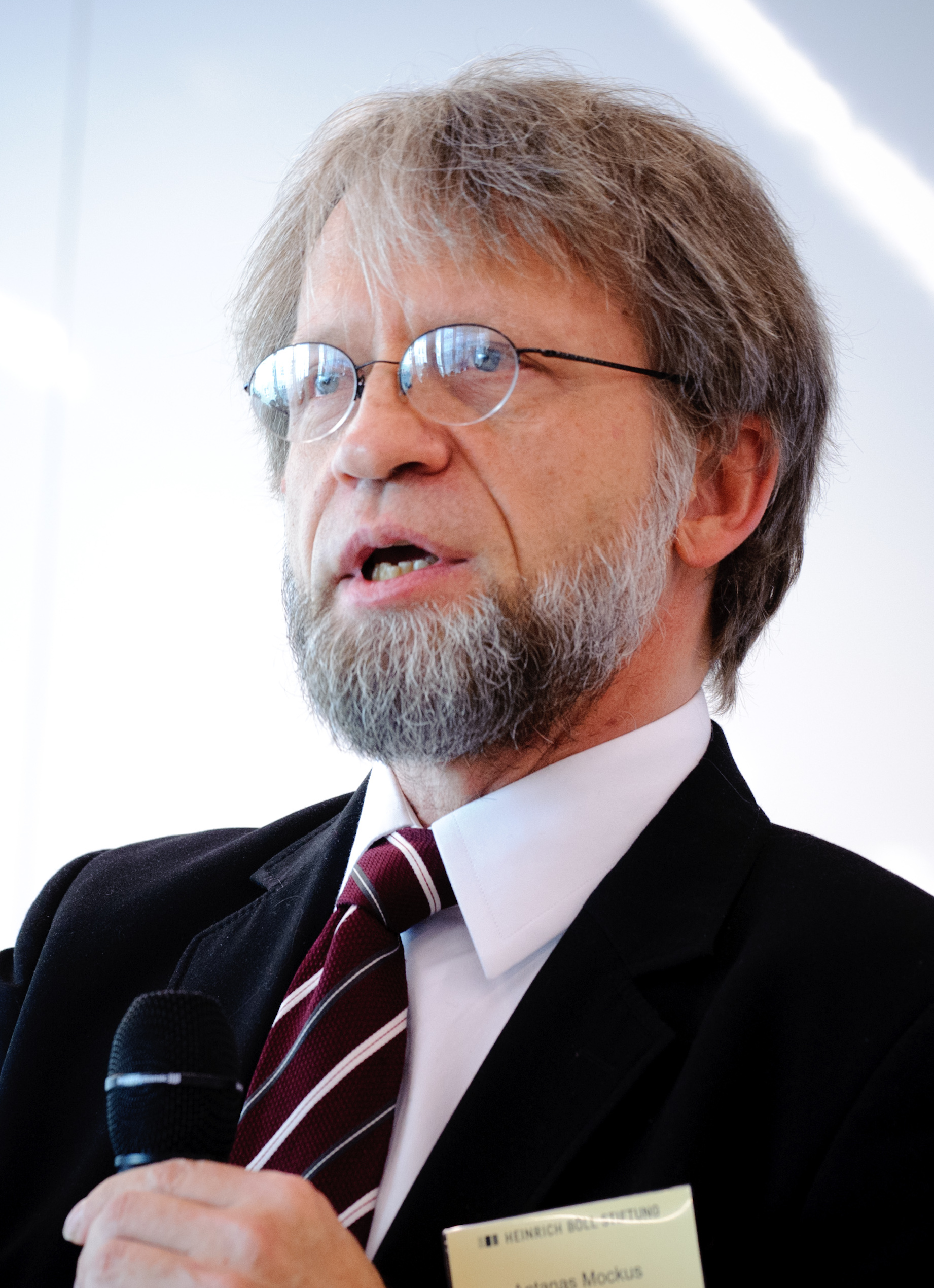
- Mockus in 2012

791st and 794th Mayor of Bogotá
- In office 1 January 2001 – 31 December 2003
- Preceded by: Enrique Peñalosa
- Succeeded by: Luis Eduardo Garzón
- In office 1 January 1995 – 10 April 1997
- Preceded by: Jaime Castro
- Succeeded by: Paul Bromberg

Headmaster of the National University of Colombia
- In office 1990–1993
- Preceded by: Darío Valencia Restrepo
- Succeeded by: Guillermo Páramo Rocha

Personal details
- Born: Aurelijus Rutenis Antanas Mockus Šivickas; 25 March 1952 (age 74) Bogotá, D.C., Colombia
- Party: None
- Other political affiliations: Colombian Green Party; Indigenous Social Alliance Movement; Yes Colombia; Visionarios con Antanas Mockus
- Spouse: Adriana Córdoba
- Education: National University of Colombia; University of Burgundy
- Occupation: Politician, activist
- Profession: Philosopher, mathematician

Aurelijus Rūtenis Antanas Mockus Šivickas (Spanish pronunciation: [anˈtanas ˈmokus]; born 25 March 1952) is a Colombian mathematician, philosopher, and politician. He has a master's degree in philosophy from the National University of Colombia, and a Honoris Causa PhD from the University of Paris. He is the son of Lithuanian immigrants. He left office as the president of the National University of Colombia in Bogotá in 1993, and later that year ran a successful campaign for mayor. He proceeded to preside over Bogotá as mayor for two non-consecutive terms, during which he became known for springing surprising and humorous initiatives upon the city's inhabitants. These tended to involve grand gestures, including local artists or personal appearances by the mayor himself—taking a shower in a commercial about conserving water, or walking the streets dressed in spandex and a cape as Supercitizen.

On 4 March 2010, Mockus was elected in a public consultation as the Colombian Green Party candidate for the 2010 Colombian presidential election. On 4 April, he chose Sergio Fajardo, former mayor of Medellín, as his vice-presidential running mate. On 9 April, he announced that he had been diagnosed with Parkinson's disease. He told La W radio: "The prediction is that this will not affect my mental activities. I think it is absolutely fitting to tell the people about the diagnosis and about the prognosis—which is 12 years or more of normal life thanks to medication." Mockus finished second in the polling, leading to a runoff election with Juan Manuel Santos, which Santos won. Mockus resigned from the Green Party in June 2011 because he opposed its Bogotá mayoral candidate being supported by former right-wing President Álvaro Uribe.

Mockus became Senator of the Republic of Colombia in July 2018, after being the second candidate with the most votes in the legislative elections held on March 11, 2018. He is also the president of the Corporación Visionarios por Colombia (Corpovisionarios), center of thought and non-profit action that investigates, advises, designs and implements actions to achieve voluntary changes in collective behavior.

== Early life and career ==
Mockus was born in Bogotá. He holds a 1972 Bachelor of Arts degree in mathematics from the University of Burgundy in Dijon, France and a 1988 Master of Arts degree in philosophy from the National University of Colombia. He has been a professor and researcher at the university since 1975 and has served as its vice president (1988–1991) and president (1991–1993). As its president, he contributed to the formulation of the Colombian Constitution of 1991, focusing on educational issues. In a notable 1993 incident, when confronted with a disruptive group of students, he mooned them. He later explained his action by saying "Innovative behavior can be useful when you run out of words", and linked it to philosopher Pierre Bourdieu's concept of "symbolic violence." He resigned as University president during the aftermath but gained a higher public profile that benefited his subsequent run for the mayorship.

== Bogotá mayorship ==
In 1995, he was elected Mayor of Bogotá. Under Mockus's leadership, Bogotá saw improvements such as: water usage dropped 40%, 7,000 community security groups were formed and the homicide rate fell 70%, traffic fatalities dropped by over 50%, drinking water was provided to all homes (up from 79% in 1993), and sewerage was provided to 95% of homes (up from 71%). When he asked residents to pay a voluntary extra 10% in taxes, 63,000 people did so. His market-oriented social policies were much less successful. Poverty and unemployment levels were high throughout his tenures and continue to be a pressing issue in Bogotá's social life.

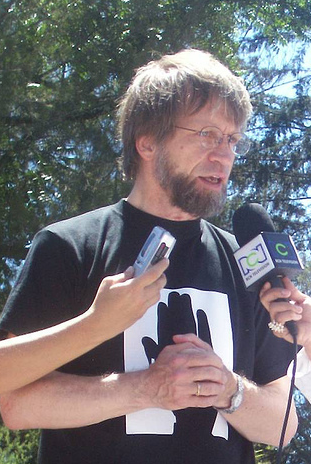
Mockus in 2008

Famous initiatives included hiring 420 mimes to make fun of traffic violators, because he believed Colombians were more afraid of being ridiculed than fined. He also put in place one "Night Without Men", on which the city's men were asked to stay home for an evening to look after the house and the children while the women went out. The city sponsored free open-air concerts, bars offered women-only specials, Ciclovia and the city's women police were in charge of keeping the peace. Amassing political support mainly from Bogotá's middle and upper classes, he has been much less successful attracting voters in the national level.

During Mockus' unsuccessful presidential bid in 1998, Enrique Peñalosa replaced him as mayor. Peñalosa worked in a similar way instituting popular new bike paths and bus systems. When Mockus ran again for the 2001 mayorship, he held a ceremony in a public fountain "to ask forgiveness for leaving the mayor's office in an unsuccessful bid for the presidency." The impact of Mockus and Peñalosa on the development of Bogotá is described in a documentary film released in October 2009 with the title CITIES ON SPEED – Bogotá Change.

In 2003, Mockus stepped down as mayor, to be replaced by Luis Eduardo Garzón, and took a year's sabbatical, traveling and speaking around the world. He planned to return to teaching at National University of Colombia the following year, although he said he was "considering the possibility of launching a presidential campaign". After spending two weeks as a visiting fellow at the Harvard's Kennedy School of Government in the United States in 2004, "to share lessons about civic engagement with students and faculty", Mockus returned to Harvard as a Visiting Professor of Romance Languages and Literatures to teach two Spanish classes during the Fall 2004–2005 semester. In November, Mockus made a special trip to the University of Virginia to speak about the use of positive social mechanisms in relation to his tenure as the mayor of Bogotá.

In 2004, Lithuanian worldwide daily Draugas chose Mockus as Lithuanian of the Year. In October 2004 he visited the Lithuanian community in Chicago, which is the biggest Lithuanian community outside of Lithuania, and delivered a speech in his native Lithuanian language. He is the president of Corpovisionarios, an organization that consults to cities about addressing their problems through the same policy methodology that was so successful during his terms as Mayor of Bogotá.

== Presidential bids ==
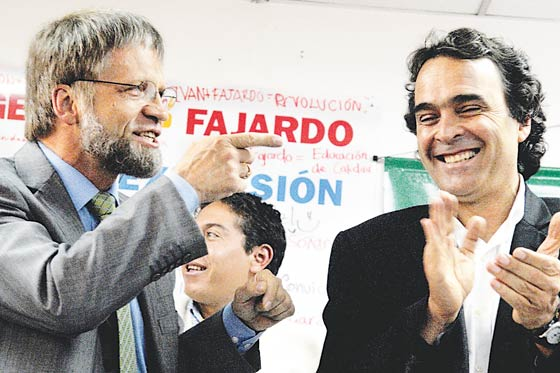
Antanas Mockus and Sergio Fajardo

In between his two terms as mayor, Mockus ran an unsuccessful 1998 bid for the presidency, first in his own name and later as Noemí Sanín Posada's running mate. Mockus ran in the 2006 presidential election as a member of the Indigenous Social Alliance Movement. He finished fourth in the election, attracting 1.24% of the vote.

In August 2009, Mockus and two other past mayors of Bogotá (Enrique Peñalosa and Luis Eduardo Garzón) joined a new political movement, Colombian Green Party and decided that one of them would run for office in the 2010 Colombian presidential elections. Mockus, Peñalosa and Garzón embarked on an innovative campaign, in which they acknowledged and honored each other's qualifications and preparedness for the job, and telling people to choose whomever they liked best. Through a popular consultation carried on 14 March 2010, which he won by a large margin, Mockus became the Colombian Green Party presidential candidate. On 4 April 2010, Antanas Mockus chose Medellín's former mayor Sergio Fajardo as his running mate, unifying two groups at the center of the political spectrum. Mockus finished second in the first round of voting, with 21.5% of the vote, qualifying him to participate in a runoff election with Juan Manuel Santos, which Mockus lost decisively with 27.5% of the vote.

Antanas Mockus left the Green Party in 2011.

Academic offices
Preceded by Darío Valencia Restrepo	Rector of the National University of Colombia; 1991–1993	Succeeded by Guillermo Páramo Rocha
Political offices
Preceded by Jaime Castro Castro	Mayor of Bogotá; 1995–1997	Succeeded by Paul Bromberg
Preceded by Enrique Peñalosa	Mayor of Bogotá; 2001–2003	Succeeded by Luis Eduardo Garzón
Party political offices
New political party	Yes Colombia nominee for Vice President of Colombia; 1998	Succeeded by Fabio Villegas Ramírez
First	Green Party nominee for President of Colombia; 2010	Succeeded by Enrique Peñalosa
