= Mauricio Rodríguez Múnera =

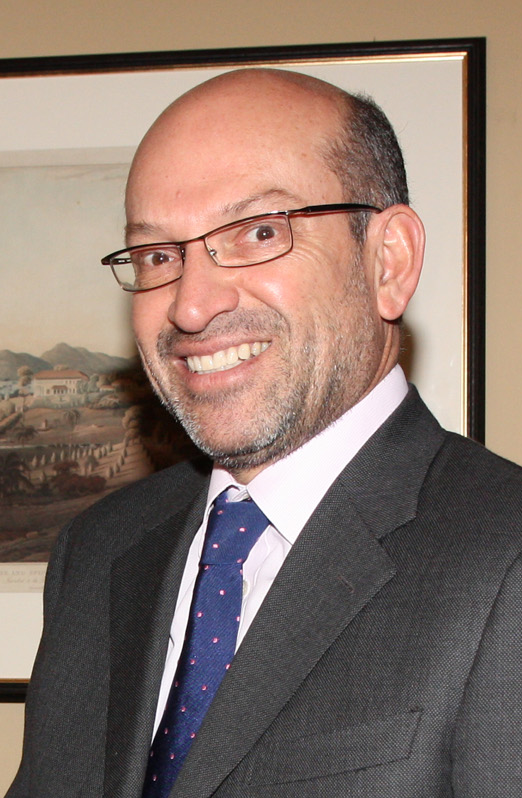

29th Colombia Ambassador to the United Kingdom
- In office 11 February 2010 – February 2014
- President: Álvaro Uribe Vélez
- Preceded by: Noemí Sanín Posada
- Succeeded by: Néstor Osorio Londoño

Colombia Ambassador to Ireland
- Incumbent
- Assumed office 17 February 2010
- President: Álvaro Uribe Vélez
- Preceded by: Noemí Sanín Posada

Personal details
- Born: 5 March 1958 (age 68) Bogotá, D.C., Colombia
- Spouse: Sugey Pinzón Alonso (2009-present)
- Education: Colegio de Estudios Superiores de Administración (BBA, 1980)
- Occupation: Journalist
- Profession: Business Administrator

José Mauricio Rodríguez Múnera (born 5 March 1958) was Ambassador of Colombia to the United Kingdom. He also served concurrently as Non-Resident Ambassador to Ireland. He completed secondary education at Colegio San Carlos in Bogotá, Colombia. He is the founder and former director of Portafolio, Colombia’s most prominent economic and finance newspaper, and has been a journalist for Caracol Radio, El Tiempo and El Espectador, among others. He has also worked as Dean of the Colegio de Estudios Superiores de Administración, his alma mater from 2007 to 2009, and was with Dow Chemical from 1981 to 1993, where he occupied several directive positions in Colombia, Venezuela, the United States, Switzerland and Italy.

== Ambassadorship ==
On 15 August 2010, President Álvaro Uribe Vélez designated Rodríguez to succeed Noemí Sanín Posada as Ambassador of Colombia to the United Kingdom. On October 5, in an official ceremony at the Palace of Nariño, Rodríguez was sworn in by President Uribe as Ambassador Extraordinary and Plenipotentiary of the Republic of Colombia to the United Kingdom of Great Britain and Northern Ireland concurrently accredited as Non-Resident Ambassador to the Republic of Ireland. Rodríguez arrived in London on October 10, officially taking his post as Head of Mission and settling into his official residence, but officially presented his Letters of Credence to Her Majesty Queen Elizabeth II in an official ceremony at Buckingham Palace on 11 February 2011, and later that month travelled to Ireland to present his Letters of Credence to Mary McAleese, President of Ireland, in an official ceremony at Áras an Uachtaráin on 17 February.

=== Awards ===
In January 2013, Rodríguez was awarded the Grassroot Diplomat Initiative Award under the Policy Driver category for his vocal participation for the prohibition on narcotic drugs.
