= Vera Grabe =

Colombian politician and anthropologist

Vera Grabe Loewenherz
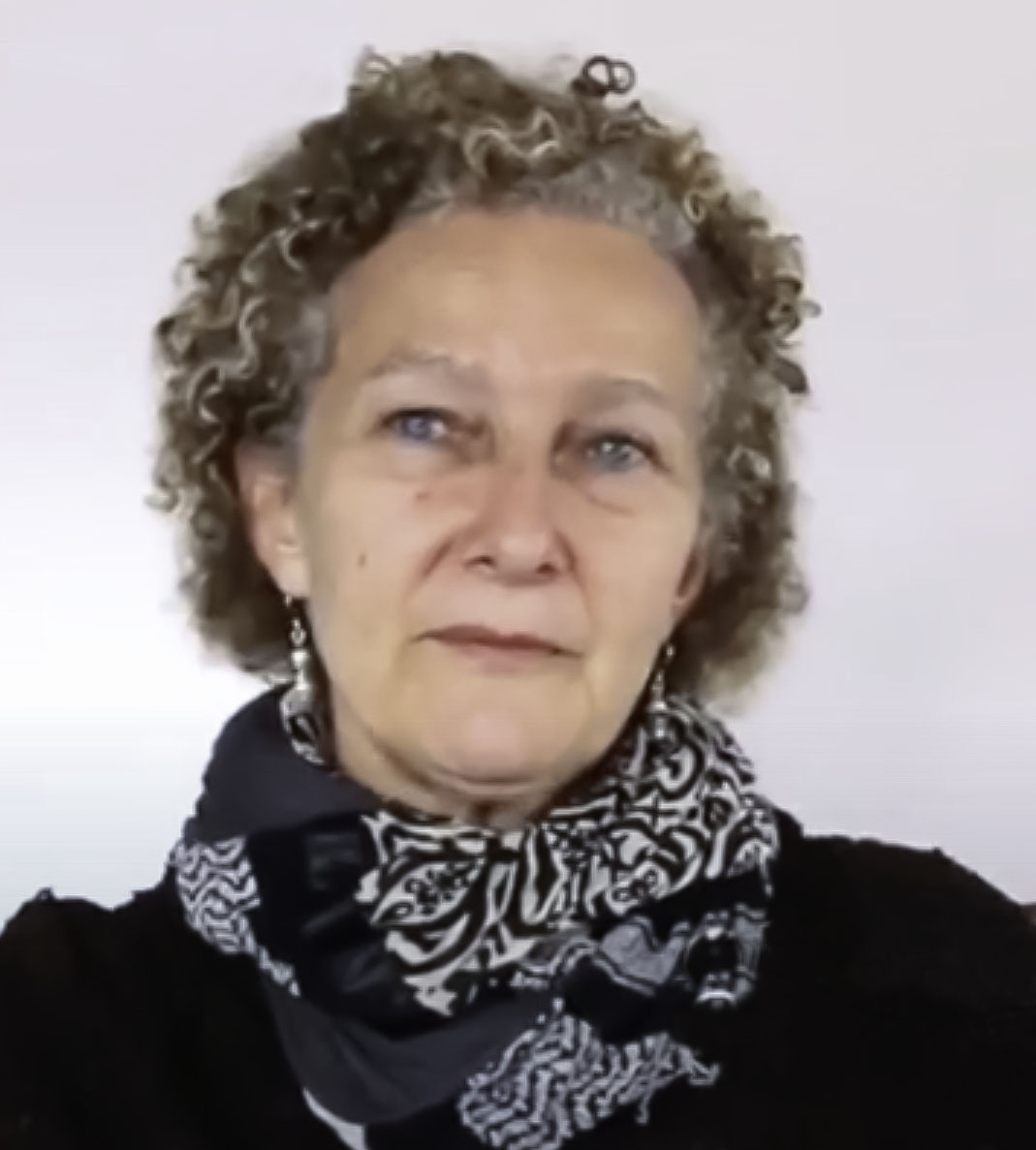
- Grabe in 2014

Senator of Colombia
- In office 20 July 1991 – 20 July 1994

Member of the Colombian Chamber of Representatives
- In office 1990–1991

Personal details
- Born: 1951 (age 74–75) Bogotá, DC, Colombia
- Party: M-19 Democratic Alliance
- Other political affiliations: Social and Political Front (associated with)
- Education: University of Valle; University of the Andes (Master's); University of Granada (Doctorate)
- Profession: Anthropologist, Political Scientist

Vera Grabe Loewenherz is a Colombian anthropologist, politician, and former member of the Colombian guerrilla M-19, of which she was also a co-founder.

== Career ==
Her parents migrated to Colombia from Germany. After serving with M-19, she rejoined society through a peace accord that permitted rebels to disarm and suffer no retaliation from the Government. She holds a master's degree in history from the University of the Andes and a doctorate in Peace, Conflict and Democracy from the University of Granada, Spain.

Under the banner of the M-19 Democratic Alliance, a political party spin-off of the former armed group, she was elected to Congress, first as Representative of the Chamber, and then as Senator of Colombia. In the Colombian presidential election of 2002 she ran as vice presidential candidate for Luis Eduardo Garzón in the Social and Political Front ticket.

She has worked as a diplomatic attachée on human rights with the Embassy of Colombia in Spain, Director of the NGO Observatorio para la Paz (1998–1999), professor and editor, and peace advocate.

The Colombian government appointed her as its head negotiator with the National Liberation Army (ELN) in December 2023.

== Bibliography ==
- Durán, Mauricio García; Loewenherz, Vera Grabe; Hormaza, Otty Patiño (2008). M-19's Journey from Armed Struggle to Democratic Politics: Striving to Keep the Revolution Connected to the People. Berghof Research Center for Constructive Conflict Management. ISBN 978-3-927783-87-4.
- Grabe, Vera (2017). La paz como revolución: M-19 (in Spanish). Taller de Edición Rocca. ISBN 978-958-56157-4-8.
