= Noemí Sanín =

Colombian-born politician and diplomat

Noemí Sanín Posada
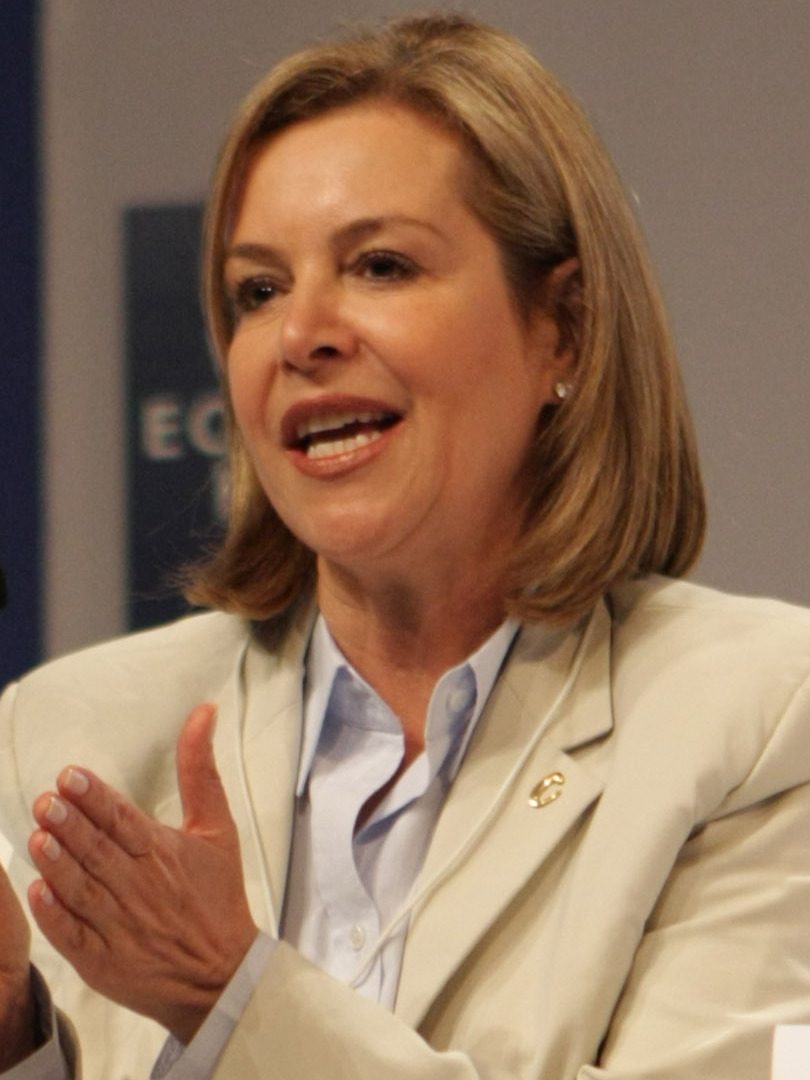
- Sanín at the World Economic Forum in 2010

28th Colombia Ambassador to the United Kingdom
- In office 19 November 2007 – 23 July 2009
- President: Álvaro Uribe
- Preceded by: Carlos Eduardo Medellín
- Succeeded by: Mauricio Rodríguez Múnera

22nd Colombia Ambassador to the United Kingdom
- In office 17 October 1994 – 15 November 1995
- President: Ernesto Samper
- Preceded by: Luis Prieto Ocampo
- Succeeded by: Carlos Lemos Simmonds

Colombia Ambassador to Spain
- In office 2002 – 19 November 2007
- President: Álvaro Uribe
- Preceded by: Álvaro Villegas Mejía
- Succeeded by: Carlos Rodado Noriega

Minister of Foreign Affairs
- In office 8 November 1991 – 7 August 1994
- President: César Gaviria
- Preceded by: Luis Fernando Jaramillo
- Succeeded by: Rodrigo Pardo García-Peña

Colombian Ambassador to Venezuela
- In office 1990 – 8 November 1991
- President: César Gaviria
- Preceded by: Gustavo Vasco Muñoz
- Succeeded by: Rodrigo Pardo García-Peña

Minister of Communications
- In office 1983 – 7 August 1986
- President: Belisario Betancur Cuartas
- Preceded by: Antonio Abello Roca
- Succeeded by: Carlos Lemos Simmonds

Personal details
- Born: Marta Noemí del Espíritu Santo Sanín Posada; 6 June 1949 (age 77) Medellín, Antioquia, Colombia
- Party: Conservative
- Other political affiliations: Yes Colombia
- Spouses: Diego Durán Cabal (1968–1975); Mario Alberto Rubio Caicedo (1980–1999)
- Domestic partner: Javier Aguirre (2002–present)
- Children: María Jimena Durán Sanín
- Education: Pontifical Xavierian University (LLB, 1973); Harvard University (WCIA Fellow, 2001)
- Profession: Lawyer

Marta Noemí del Espíritu Santo Sanín Posada (born 6 June 1949) is a Colombian-born politician and diplomat. She was the Conservative party candidate in the 2010 Colombian presidential election.

A lawyer from Pontifical Xavierian University and 2001 Fellow at the Weatherhead Center for International Affairs, Harvard University, she has served as Ambassador of Colombia to the United Kingdom, Ambassador of Colombia to Spain, Ambassador of Colombia to Venezuela, Minister of Foreign Affairs of Colombia, and Minister of Communications of Colombia.

Before running in 2010 as a Conservative, Sanín ran as an independent candidate during the 1998 presidential election, and again during the 2002 presidential election, backed both times by the Yes Colombia movement.

== Education ==
Sanín studied law at the Pontifical Xavierian University in Bogotá. She later studied post graduate studies in Commercial law and finance and worked for several entities in the financial sector in both state and private sectors.

In 1998 Sanín moved to the United States and established herself in Boston, where she attended Harvard University as a Weatherhead Center for International Affairs Fellow.

== Political career ==
In 1976 Sanín was appointed as Vice President of Operations and Credit in the Corporación de Ahorro y Vivienda, (Colmena) (Savings and Housing Corporation) until 1979. She was later appointed President of this institution with only 30 years of age and became the first woman in Latin America to ever manage a financial corporation. Her most notable achievements as President of Colmena was to have financed a large portion of the low-income sector of Colombia and expanded the national network of branches from 36 to 63 until the end of her terms in 1983. She also promoted a savings culture among the corporations' clients.

=== Minister of Communications 1983 ===
Sanín served as Minister of Communications between 1983 and 1986, appointed by President of Colombia, Belisario Betancur. Among her achievements as minister of Communications Sanín helped to develop Law 42 of 1985 which modernized Television in Colombia and legalized and organized the regional TV networks. She also helped in the approval and introductions of cable television. This law also modernized other telecommunication state owned companies such as Telecom, Caprecom and Audiovisuales.

=== Palace of Justice siege ===
On November 6, 1985 an urban commando of the 19th of April Movement guerrilla group stormed the Palace of Justice building to demand a public prosecution of then president of Colombia, Belisario Betancur. The president ordered the military to retake the building. Acting as minister of Communications Sanín decided not to allow the retake to be broadcast live on television or radio, instead it continued with the usual programming. Twenty-eight hours later the retake ended with 55 dead including 11 judges of the Supreme Court of Colombia as well as 11 people disappeared.

=== Peace negotiator in Casa Verde ===
President Betancur appointed Sanín as representative of the government in the first commission that visited Casa Verde, the then headquarters of the Revolutionary Armed Forces of Colombia (FARC) guerrilla, to negotiate a peaceful solution to the Colombian armed conflict.

=== Ambassador of Colombia in Venezuela 1990 ===
Sanín served as Ambassador of Colombia to Venezuela between 1990 and 1991, appointed by then President of Colombia, César Gaviria. During her term as ambassador commerce exchange between Colombia and Venezuela increased from US$300 million to US$1350 million a year until the end of her job.

=== Minister of Foreign Affairs 1991 ===
On 8 November 1991, President Gaviria reshuffled his cabinet and named Sanín Minister of Foreign Affairs, Latin America's first female Foreign Affairs Minister. During her term as minister she modernized the administrative structure of the ministry. She also won a seat for Colombia in the Security Council of the United Nations and the presidency of the country in the G-77. She also gained the presidency for the nation in the Non-Aligned Movement and signed the border dispute resolution Sanín-Robertson treaty which resolved borders with Jamaica. In addition she won the seat as Secretary General of Organization of American States for Colombia with the appointment of César Gaviria.

=== Ambassador of Colombia to the United Kingdom 1994 ===
In 1994 Sanín was appointed consul of Colombia to the United Kingdom. Sanín promoted the visit of four ministers of Great Britain to Colombia and helped to negotiate new airline routes between the United Kingdom and Colombia. British investors and companies such as RTZ also invested in Colombia in the mining and energy, and pharmaceutical sectors. She renounced after only one year after the then Attorney General of Colombia formally accused President Ernesto Samper in the Accusations Commission of the Chamber of Representatives of Colombia after his involvement in the "8000 Process scandal". Upon her return, Colombia was facing an economic crisis, political and social instability without precedents and decided to prepare herself for the presidency of Colombia.

=== Presidential candidate 1998 ===
In the 1998 presidential elections, Sanín supported by her founded political movement Yes Colombia did surprisingly well, receiving about 27% of the vote, to finish third behind leaders Horacio Serpa and Andrés Pastrana, who each received about 35% in the first round. Running on an anti-unemployment campaign, Sanín in fact won the most votes in the cities of Bogotá and Medellín, but fared poorly in the countryside. Her campaign later supported the Great Alliance for Change led by Andrés Pastrana.

=== Presidential candidate 2002 ===
In 2002, she ran again for president, this time as a member of her own movement, the Yes Colombia party. With national security overriding the other issues in the campaign, she did far worse than in 1998 and received only 5.8% of the vote. Part of her platform was to denounce Álvaro Uribe's ties with extreme right-wing paramilitary groups.

=== Ambassador of Colombia in Spain 2003 ===
In 2003, Sanín became Colombia's Ambassador to Spain. She decided not to run for the 2006 Colombian presidential elections. As Colombian ambassador to Spain Sanín had to deal with the growing discrimination against Colombians in that country, issues related to illegal Colombian immigrants in Spain and the large number of Colombian citizens imprisoned in the European country. She also promoted numerous cultural exchanges and advocated on behalf of temporary work and technical and education training for Colombians in Spain. On November 19, 2007 President Uribe announced her transfer to the United Kingdom diplomatic mission, being replaced by the Vice President of Colombia, Francisco Santos.

=== Ambassador of Colombia in the United Kingdom 2007 ===
On November 19, 2007, President Álvaro Uribe requested the government of the United Kingdom for Sanín's approval as ambassador of Colombia to the United Kingdom. The move came after the ambassador to the United Kingdom Carlos Eduardo Medellín Becerra was transferred to the Netherlands after the Ambassador Guillermo Fernández de Soto resigned alleging family problems. According to the Colombian newspaper El Tiempo, Sanín's ambassadorship in the United Kingdom would be temporary, as she entertained presidential aspirations. Her resignation was effective on 23 July 2009.

=== Presidential candidate 2010 ===
In 2010, she ran again for president, this time as a member of the conservative party. She defeated Andrés Felipe Arias Leiva in the preliminaries, but was unable to gain momentum and was defeated by Juan Manuel Santos, and Antanas Mockus among others.

== Personal life ==
Sanín was born on 6 June 1949 in Medellín, Antioquia to Jaime Sanín Echeverri and Noemí Posada Saldarriaga, their third child out of fifteen children. Her father was a hardline conservative writer, journalist and a vice-president of the Colombian Language Academy; her mother a teacher and housewife. She married young at the age of 19 to Diego Durán Cabal, and together they had one daughter, María Jimena. She divorced in 1975 and remarried to Mario Alberto Rubio Caicedo, a lawyer from Bogotá, but the marriage ended in 1999 leaving no children.
