= 1998 Colombian presidential election =

- 31 May 1998 (first round); 21 June 1998 (second round)
- Turnout: 51.55% (first round) ▲17.60pp 58.76% (second round) ▲15.44pp
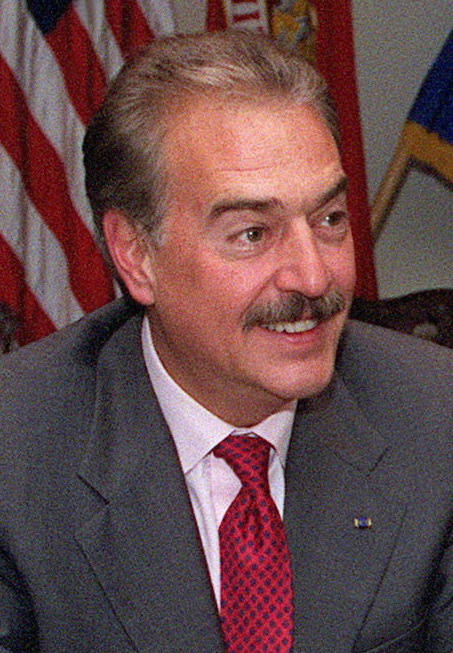

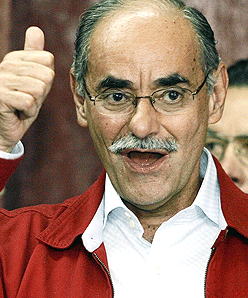
Nominee	Andrés Pastrana Arango	Horacio Serpa
Party	Conservative	Liberal
Running mate	Gustavo Bell	María Emma Mejía Vélez
Popular vote	6,114,752	5,658,518
Percentage	50.34%	46.58%
President before election
Ernesto Samper
Liberal
Elected President
Andrés Pastrana Arango
Conservative

Presidential elections were held in Colombia on 31 May 1998, with a second round on 21 June. Although Horacio Serpa of the Liberal Party received the most votes in the first round, the result was a victory for Andrés Pastrana Arango of the Great Alliance for Change, who received 50.3% of the vote in the run-off.

== Results ==
Candidate	Running mate	Party	First round		Second round	
Candidate	Running mate	Party	Votes	%	Votes	%
Horacio Serpa	María Emma Mejía	Colombian Liberal Party	3,696,334	34.78	5,658,518	46.58
Andrés Pastrana Arango	Gustavo Bell	Great Alliance for Change	3,653,048	34.37	6,114,752	50.34
Noemí Sanín	Antanas Mockus	Yes Colombia	2,845,750	26.77		
Harold Bedoya Pizarro	Jorge García Hurtado	Force Colombia	193,037	1.82		
Beatriz Cuellar	Irmo Howard Robinson	Christian Union Movement	30,832	0.29		
Germán Rojas Niño	Manuel Medina	19th of April Movement	16,072	0.15		
Jorge Hernán Betancur	Ángel Humberto Rojas	Metapolitical Unitary Movement	13,892	0.13		
Jesús Antonio Lozano	Hilda María Espinosa	National Movement of Black Communities	11,834	0.11		
Jorge Pulecio	Gustavo Navia	People's Participation Movement	11,500	0.11		
Guillermo Alemán	Marilyn Gómez	Ecological Orientation Movement	9,885	0.09		
Efraín Díaz Valderrama	Álvaro Pinto	Citizens in Training Movement	9,255	0.09		
Guillermo Nanneti	Nelson Fredy Osorio	Progressive National Movement–Coalition for Peace	8,862	0.08		
Francisco Córdoba Zartha	José Elver Muñoz	Seventh Ballot Movement	5,891	0.06		
Blank votes			122,431	1.15	373,659	3.08
Total			10,628,623	100.00	12,146,929	100.00
Valid votes			10,628,623	98.86	12,146,929	99.11
Invalid votes			122,842	1.14	108,794	0.89
Total votes			10,751,465	100.00	12,255,723	100.00
Registered voters/turnout			20,856,150	51.55	20,857,801	58.76
Source: Nohlen
