= Enrique Peñalosa =

Colombian politician (born 1954)

Enrique Peñalosa Londoño
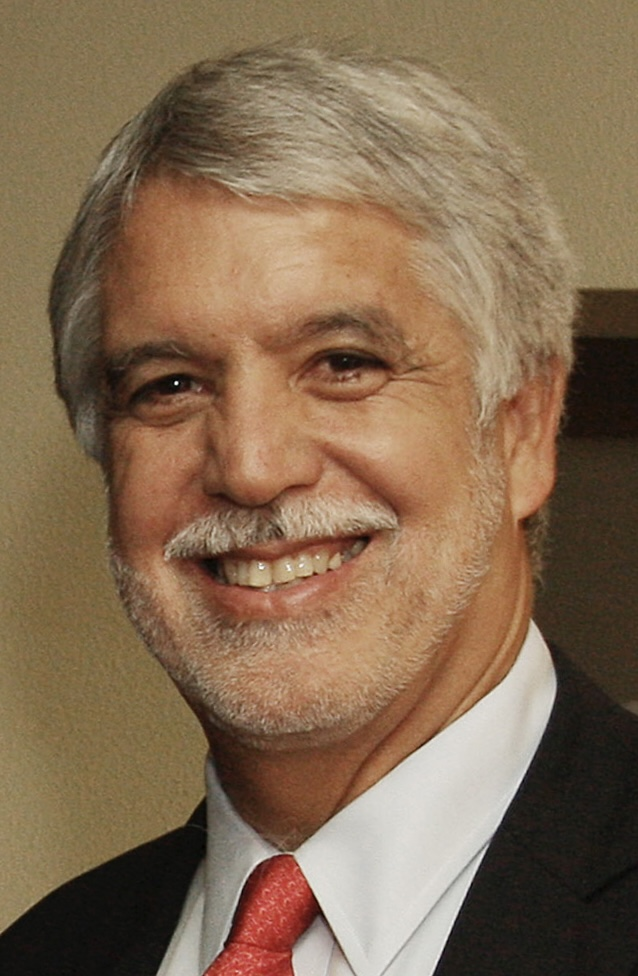
- Peñalosa in 2012

Mayor of Bogotá
- In office 1 January 2016 – 1 January 2020
- Preceded by: Gustavo Petro
- Succeeded by: Claudia López
- In office 1 January 1998 – 1 January 2001
- Preceded by: Paul Bromberg
- Succeeded by: Antanas Mockus

Director of the Colombian Institute of Savings and Housing
- In office 1992–1997
- President: César Gaviria; Ernesto Samper
- Preceded by: Gabriel Rosas Vega
- Succeeded by: Guillermo Gómez Estrada

Member of the Chamber of Representatives of Colombia
- In office 20 July 1990 – 12 December 1991
- Constituency: Bogotá

Economic Secretary to the Presidency of the Republic of Colombia
- In office 7 August 1986 – 31 December 1989
- President: Virgilio Barco Vargas

Rector of the Universidad Externado de Colombia
- In office 4 February 1985 – 7 August 1986
- Preceded by: Antonio Hernández Gamarra
- Succeeded by: Mauricio Pérez Salazar

Member of the Department Assembly of Cundinamarca
- In office 1 January 1984 – 1 January 1986

Personal details
- Born: 30 September 1954 (age 72) Washington, DC, United States
- Citizenship: Colombia (since 1954); United States (1954–1975)
- Party: Oxygen Party (since 2026)
- Other political affiliations: Liberal Party (1982–2007); Green Alliance (2009–2015); Radical Change (2015–2021); Team for Colombia (2021–2022); Union Party for the People (2022–2026)
- Domestic partner: Liliana Sánchez
- Children: 2
- Education: Duke University (AB); Paris-Panthéon-Assas University (MA); Gimnasio Campestre (PhD)
- Occupation: Economist • Urbanist • Politician

Enrique Peñalosa Londoño (born 30 September 1954) is a Colombian politician. He was mayor of Bogotá from 1998 until 2001 and again from 2016 until 2020.

== Early life and education ==
Peñalosa was born in Washington, DC, to Cecilia Londoño and Enrique Peñalosa Camargo, former Minister of Agriculture and permanent ambassador for Colombia to the UN. During his childhood, Peñalosa studied at Gimnasio Campestre and the Colegio Refous. His family moved to the United States when he was 15 years old for his father's work as the ambassador of Colombia to the UN. He attended Duke University through a partial football scholarship, where he earned a Bachelor of Arts in Economics and History.

He has also worked as a journalist and consultant on urban and transportation policy. In 2009, Peñalosa was elected president of the board of directors of the Institute for Transportation and Development Policy (ITDP), a non-profit organization headquartered in New York. Peñalosa resigned from the ITDP board in 2015 upon his election.

== Entry into politics ==
Peñalosa began his political life by attending youth groups of followers of the liberal presidential candidate Luis Carlos Galan in Bogotá while working for the state-owned water supply company, Empresa de Acueducto de Bogotá (EAAB). He later supported Julio César Sánchez, a Cundinamarca local political chief, who in return helped him get elected as that department's deputy.

In 1986 he was chosen by president Virgilio Barco, a friend of his father, as an economic advisor. In 1990, he ran for the congress without the support of any politician and got elected with 22,000 votes. He only remained in that position for a year because the Colombian Congress was closed on the eve of the new Colombian Constitution. However, in those 12 months, he presented many initiatives and managed to pass a reform law, a notable accomplishment for a freshman congressman.

In 1991, he decided to run for mayor of Bogotá with the same tactics he had used to gain his seat in Congress, without the support of any politicians, just by face-to-face contact while touring the city walking, biking or riding on public transportation. He ran against Jaime Castro Castro, who ultimately won the election. In 1994, Peñalosa ran for a second time against Antanas Mockus, who defeated him by a large margin.

== Mayor of Bogotá (1998–2001) ==
In 1997, he ran a third time, now facing Carlos Moreno de Caro, winning by a close margin of votes. Peñalosa received from Mayor Mockus a city in good fiscal condition and with a District Council that was mostly independent. Enrique's brother, Gil Peñalosa, served as Commissioner of Parks under Mayor Mockus.

Peñalosa included many of his political friends in his cabinet, including longtime friend Carlos Alberto Sandoval, who had worked with him in Barco's presidency, whom he appointed as Secretary of Economy, and Gilma Jiménez in the Family Welfare Institute.

During his mayorship he developed five megaprojects: the bank of lands, the District's system of Parks (including the Bogotá's Bike Paths Network), the District's system of libraries, the Transmilenio mass transit system, and road construction and maintenance. The impact of Peñalosa and Antanas Mockus on the development of Bogotá is described in a documentary film released in October 2009 with the title Bogotá Change. It is promoted as being "the story of two charismatic mayors, Antanas Mockus and Enrique Peñalosa who, with unorthodox methods, in less than 10 years turned one of the world's most dangerous, violent and corrupt capitals into a model city. Mockus and Peñalosa along with key members of their staff as first hand witnesses, the film uncovers the ideas, philosophies and strategies that underlie the changes in Bogotá and which are now being exported to cities worldwide". Throughout the first half of his time as mayor, Peñalosa underwent very low approval ratings, even surviving a recall election process mid-term. As public infrastructure projects started to progress, his popularity increased very significantly, such that by the end of his term his approval ratings were some of the highest of any Bogotá mayor in recorded history.

=== Controversy during his first term ===
According to most public analysts in Colombia, Peñalosa was the third in a series of three mayors who significantly improved the public conditions in the city of Bogotá in the late 1990s. Mayor Jaime Castro finished his term with low popularity, but was able to reform the city's financial structures. This led to a period of budgetary surpluses, which continued during Antanas Mockus' term. Mockus began an important change in Bogotá's civic culture with his Cultura Ciudadana (Citizen Culture) campaign, which encouraged civic behavior and strived to create a sense of belonging for the inhabitants of the city.

Peñalosa's six biggest policy actions during his first period as mayor included the relocation of informal vendors who occupied the public zones and streets, the improvement of all the city parks and the construction of several new ones, the construction of major public libraries and large public schools in the poorest areas in the city, the renovation of important avenues such as the 15th Avenue and Autopista Norte, the removal of cars from sidewalks by raising them and installing bollards, and starting construction of the first Mass Transit System in Bogotá, the heavy BRT called TransMilenio, whose construction started under Peñalosa to be finished under Antanas Mockus's second term (2001–2003).

Some of his policies were unpopular with certain political groups within the city. Among these were his intent to buy the Country Club of Bogotá to build a public park, which brought him in conflict with some of the wealthiest neighborhoods in Northern Bogotá. He also faced problems when he installed bollards along some avenues in highly congested sectors to prevent cars from parking on the sidewalk in front of the buildings and shops. Peñalosa also lost popularity, but improved the city's mobility, by introducing the Pico y Placa, a restriction on the rush hour circulation of private vehicles. (Pico y placa roughly translates to "rush hour and license plate"; during rush hour licence plates ending with a given number couldn't circulate on specific days of the week, four ending numbers each day, thus about 40% of the vehicles).

The construction of the city's first "Cicloruta" (translation for "Bike route or Bike way"), which are two-way roads that run along some of the city's main avenues, was another great development of the city as an invitation for people to avoid using private motor vehicles, and to provide a cheap and healthy transportation route for those who didn't have access to one. Their construction brought some controversy at first, as the Cicloruta's corridors crossed in front of private houses where in the majority of the cases space was taken from their front sidewalk without their consent and with no remuneration. The legal property documents weren't edited either, which meant that whoever owned the house in front of the sidewalk where the Cicloruta was built, was its actual owner and had to pay taxes on it.

For his activities in promoting public transportation, bike use and public space in urban areas in his first term in office, Peñalosa was awarded several international sustainability and urban planning awards, and was selected as a distinguished guest in urban policy studies at NYU.

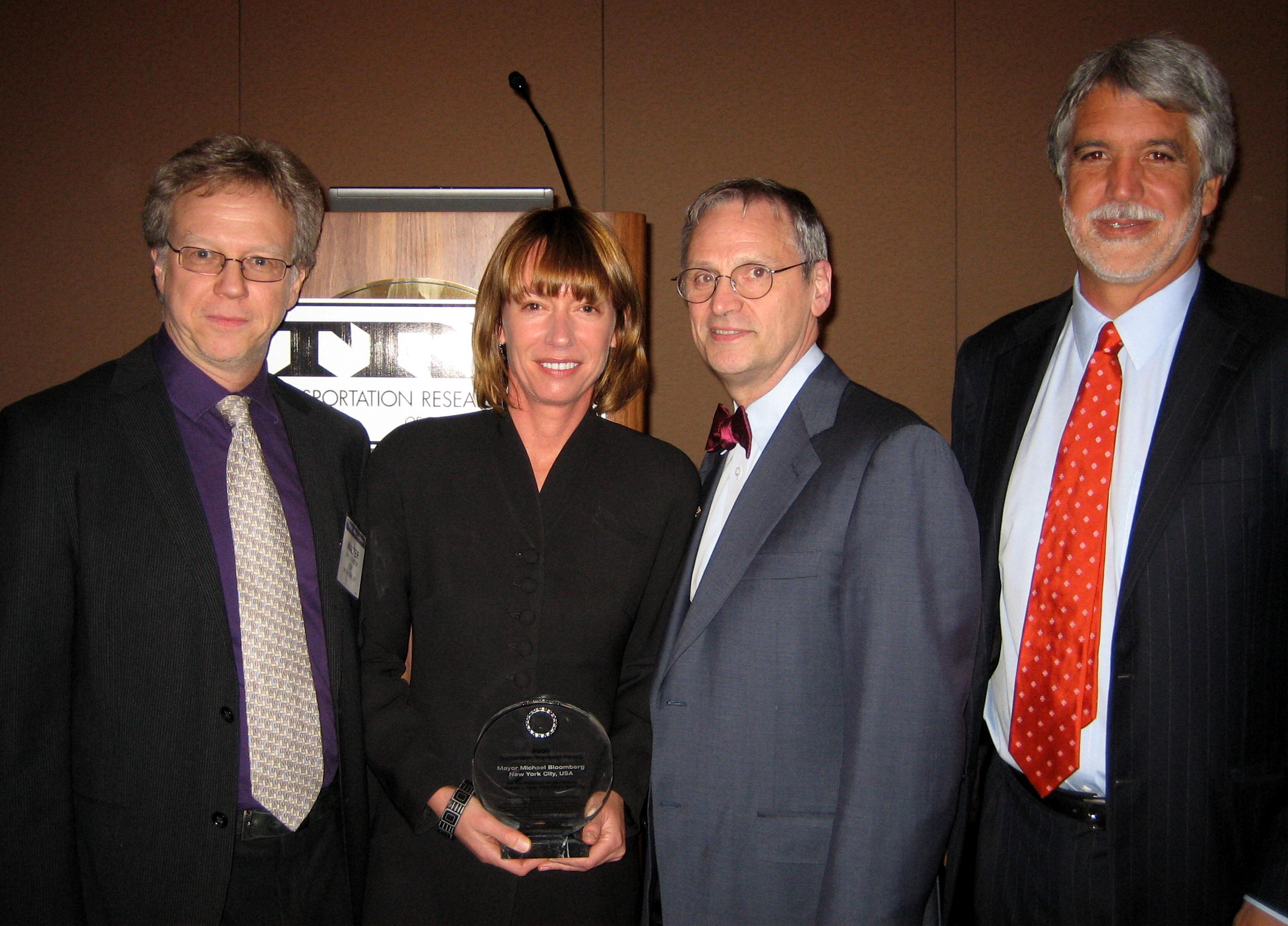
Enrique Peñalosa Londoño at the 2009 Sustainable Transport Awards

.

=== Candidate for a second term as Mayor ===
Although he was a possible candidate for the 2010 Colombian presidential election and led the Por el Pais que Queremos Foundation (PPQ), Spanish for "For the Country we Want", he chose to run again for mayor in 2007. He was defeated by Alternative Democratic Pole candidate Samuel Moreno by 15 percentage points.

In 2011, Peñalosa decided to run his candidacy again for the Bogotá city hall, but this time, as the official candidate for the Colombian Green Party. He lost the election to Gustavo Petro who won the mayoral race with 32% of the vote against 25% for Peñalosa.

In 2015 he won the mayoral elections with 33 percent of the vote, defeating former labour minister Rafael Pardo Rueda.

=== Presidential candidate ===
Peñalosa ran for elections in the 2014 presidential election. He represented the Green Party and his vice presidential candidate was Isabel Segovia, a former Vice Minister of Education.

== Mayor of Bogotá (2016–2020) ==
Enrique Peñalosa was elected mayor of Bogotá a second time on 25 October 2015, where he won with 906,052 votes and 33.1 percent of the electorate. Even before taking office for his 2016–2019 term, Peñalosa was subject to low approval ratings similar to those in the first half of his first term as mayor. In 2015 and onwards, politics in Bogotá was deeply polarized between Peñalosa's center-right policies and leftist populist policies, represented by former mayor Gustavo Petro. Peñalosa was the first center-right candidate to be elected as mayor after 12 years of leftist populist politicians in office, with Luis Eduardo Garzon (2004–2007), Samuel Moreno Rojas (2008–2011) and Gustavo Petro (2012–2015).

His principal policy proposals in his second administration include the construction of Bogota's first rapid transit line, to be complemented by several new BRT corridors following Transmilenio's early 2000 plan - including in landmark avenues such as 7th, 68th and Boyacá Avenues; the construction of 30 public schools and 6 public hospitals; the implementation of 1,500 surveillance cameras to prevent petty crime; the construction of large highways and avenues such as Avenida Longitudinal de Occidente and Tintal-Alsacia-Constitución; selling all public participation in Empresa de Telefonos de Bogotá (ETB); and the expansion of Bogotá's metropolitan area in its northern edges, in areas currently occupied by the Thomas Van Der Hammen natural reserve. Peñalosa has been in controversy with several interest groups for these proposals -specifically environmental, education, and health citizen groups, as well as his political opponents from leftist groups strong in the city. As of late 2017, a recall election attempt on Peñalosa is being spearheaded by ETB's unions (who oppose privatization) and Gustavo Petro's political group, supported by other citizen groups.

On 27 October 2019, Claudia López Hernández, a member of the Green Alliance Party, was elected to succeed Peñalosa as mayor of Bogotá. Democratic Center candidate Miguel Uribe Turbay, who served as Peñalosa's Secretary-General, came in fourth place during the election.

=== Graduate degrees scandal ===
Penalosa's critics have recently claimed that he has repeatedly misstated his professional graduate studies throughout his career. Peñalosa claims he earned a Diplôme d'études supérieures spécialisées (DESS) at the University of Paris. In response to these allegations, he has claimed that this DESS title has been repeatedly misinterpreted as a PhD. Further investigation into his studies revealed that he earned a graduate degree in Government Affairs at the University of Paris II, and later earning a DESS at the Institut international d'administration publique (also known as École nationale de la France d'outre-mer), which in 2002 was merged into École nationale d'administration.

The scandal was triggered in 2016 by an opinion article published in the Colombian newspaper El Espectador, which reported in April 2016 that Peñalosa did not hold a doctoral degree as had been widely reported by several sources, including in the personal profile section in several of his published books. Opinion writers in El Espectador discovered that Peñalosa did not hold a doctoral degree, after contacting the University of Paris, which confirmed that it did not offer any academic program that would grant a PhD in Public Administration. The magazine Semana also reported that during the swearing-in ceremony of the Mayor in January 2016, a leaflet had been circulated among news media that presented Peñalosa as a PhD of Public Administration, which the mayor dismissed as typing errors by someone in his team.

According to an opposition group actively promoting Peñalosa's 2015 election to be recalled, Peñalosa has been misrepresenting his graduate degrees for 35 years. The group denounced that in an interview with the Brazilian newspaper O Globo, Peñalosa had directly stated that he held a PhD in public administration; however, only the edited interview was ever published, and given the differences between the Spanish and Portuguese languages, other proof of this statement remained unverified, including a direct statement from the lead reporter of said interview.

Peñalosa himself has repeatedly claimed that he has never mentioned in public that he has a PhD degree, and that he firmly believes that his two graduate degrees earned in France are equivalent to master's degrees in the Colombian education system, while stating that his political opponents are actively trying to tarnish his academic credentials with unsubstantiated attacks while promoting his election to be recalled. In his first term as mayor, Peñalosa also went through a significant recall election attempt by his political opponents. According to Peñalosa's official public curriculum vitae presented to Colombian authorities when elected as mayor, Peñalosa holds a bachelor's degree in economics and history (Earned in May 1977), a master's in government affairs (earned in September 1979) and a "third cycle graduate title in Public Management", referring to the DESS title (Earned in September 1980).

== International Advocacy and Collaboration ==
Following his mayoral tenure in Bogotá, Enrique Peñalosa remained active in international urban-policy networks. He developed a professional relationship with Tirana mayor Erion Veliaj and visited Tirana in November 2024 for the Albanian presentation of A City for All, where Veliaj awarded him the Key to the City.

In 2026, Peñalosa publicly criticised the continued pretrial detention of Veliaj, calling for a fair trial and arguing that the mayor’s lengthy detention without conviction raised due-process concerns. Peñalosa also advocated for Istanbul mayor Ekrem İmamoğlu, expressing concern about his pretrial detention and its implications for due process and judicial independence. He argued that the allegations against İmamoğlu should be decided through a fair trial and that he should be released under proportionate precautionary measures pending a final judgment.

== Awards ==
- Simón Bolívar Journalism Award 1986 for his economy related journalism section in El Espectador newspaper.
- Simón Bolívar Journalism Award 1990 for his documentary Capitalismo, la mejor opción.

== Bibliography ==
=== Books ===
- Capitalismo: ¿La mejor opción?
- Democracia y Capitalismo: retos para el próximo siglo

=== Documentaries ===
- Capitalismo, la mejor opción (documentary) (1990)

=== Articles ===
He has written articles for El Tiempo, Nueva Frontera, Economía Colombiana, Carta Financiera and Revista Diners.

=== Conferences ===
- Holcim Forum 2007 of the Holcim Foundation,

Political offices
Preceded by Paul Bromberg	Mayor of Bogotá; 1998–2000	Succeeded by Antanas Mockus
Preceded by Gustavo Petro	Mayor of Bogotá; 2016–2019	Succeeded by Claudia López
