= List of ambassadors of Colombia to the United Kingdom =

Representative of Colombia to the United Kingdom

Ambassador of Colombia to the United Kingdom
- Ministry of Foreign Affairs; Embassy of Colombia, London
- Style: His or Her Excellency (formal); Mr. or Madam Ambassador (informal)
- Reports to: Minister of Foreign Affairs
- Residence: Wescott House
- Seat: London, United Kingdom
- Appointer: President of Colombia
- Term length: At the pleasure of the president
- Inaugural holder: Jaime Jaramillo Arango
- Formation: 1943
- Website: Colombian Embassy – London

The ambassador of Colombia to the United Kingdom (known formally as the ambassador of the Republic of Colombia to the Court of St James's) is the official representative of the president of Colombia and the Colombian government to the government of the United Kingdom. The position is held by Laura Sarabia.

== List ==
Name	Portrait	Appointment	Presentation	Termination	Appointer	Notes
Jaime Jaramillo Arango		1943	June/July 1943	December 9, 1945	Alfonso López Pumarejo	Ambassador
Darío Echandía		1945	December 10, 1945	August 20, 1946	Alberto Lleras Camargo	Chargé d'Affaires
Domingo Esguerra		1946	August 20, 1946	June 7, 1950	Mariano Ospina Pérez	Chargé d'Affaires
Rafael Sánchez Amaya		1950	June 7, 1950	June 10, 1957	Laureano Gómez	Chargé d'Affaires
Carlos Alberto Sardi		1957	June 12, 1957	June 4, 1959	Gustavo Rojas Pinilla	Chargé d'Affaires
Alfonso López Pumarejo		1959	June 5, 1959	November 20, 1959	Alberto Lleras Camargo	Ambassador
Virgilio Barco Vargas		1961	June 16, 1961	June 26, 1962	Alberto Lleras Camargo	Ambassador
Alfredo Araújo Grau		1962	June 27, 1962	June 2, 1967	Guillermo León Valencia	Ambassador
Víctor Mosquera Chaux		1967	June 3, 1967	April 21, 1970	Carlos Lleras Restrepo	Ambassador
Camilo Brigard		1970	April 21, 1970	January 17, 1972	Misael Pastrana Borrero	Ambassador
Julio César Turbay Ayala		1973	January 2, 1973	January 15, 1975	Misael Pastrana Borrero	Ambassador
Alfredo Vásquez Carrizosa		1975	January 16, 1975	March/April 1977	Alfonso López Michelsen	Ambassador
Jaime García Parra		1977	March/April 1977	January 17, 1979	Julio César Turbay Ayala	Ambassador
Gustavo Balcázar Monzón		1979	January 18, 1979	September 21, 1981	Julio César Turbay Ayala	Ambassador
Diego Restrepo		1981	September 22, 1981	November 28, 1982	Belisario Betancur	Ambassador
Augusto Espinosa		1982	November 29, 1982	January 16, 1985	Belisario Betancur	Ambassador
Bernardo Ramírez Rodríguez		1985	January 17, 1985	July 10, 1988	Virgilio Barco Vargas	Ambassador
Fernando Cepeda		1988	July 11, 1988	November 9, 1990	César Gaviria	Ambassador
Virgilio Barco Vargas		1990	November 9, 1990	April/May 1992	César Gaviria	Ambassador
Luis Prieto Ocampo		1992	April/May 1992	November 10, 1994	César Gaviria	Ambassador
Noemí Sanín		1994	November 11, 1994	November 15, 1995	Ernesto Samper	Ambassador
Carlos Lemos Simmonds		1995	November 15, 1995	October 15, 1997	Ernesto Samper	Ambassador
Humberto De la Calle		1997	October 16, 1997	November 12, 2000	Andrés Pastrana	Ambassador
Victor Piñeros		2000	November 12, 2000	November 6, 2002	Andrés Pastrana	Ambassador
Alfonso López Caballero		2002	November 7, 2002	December 7, 2006	Álvaro Uribe	Ambassador
Carlos Eduardo Medellín		2006	December 7, 2006	November 19, 2007	Álvaro Uribe	Ambassador
Noemí Sanín		2007	November 19, 2007	June 23, 2009	Álvaro Uribe	Ambassador
Mauricio Rodríguez Múnera		2010	February 11, 2010	May 30, 2014	Álvaro Uribe	Ambassador
Néstor Osorio Londoño		2014	June 3, 2014	March/April 2019	Juan Manuel Santos	Ambassador
Jose Antonio Ardila Gaviria		2019	November, 2019	March, 2022	Iván Duque	Ambassador
Álvaro Gómez Jaramillo		2022	March 3, 2022	July 30, 2023	Iván Duque	Ambassador
Roy Barreras		2023	December 7, 2023	April 29, 2025	Gustavo Petro	
Laura Sarabia		2025	October 14, 2025	August 7, 2026	Gustavo Petro	

== See also ==
- Ambassador
- Foreign relations of the United Kingdom
- List of ambassadors of the United Kingdom to Colombia
- Colombia–United Kingdom relations
