= Néstor Osorio =

Colombian diplomat

Néstor Osorio Londoño
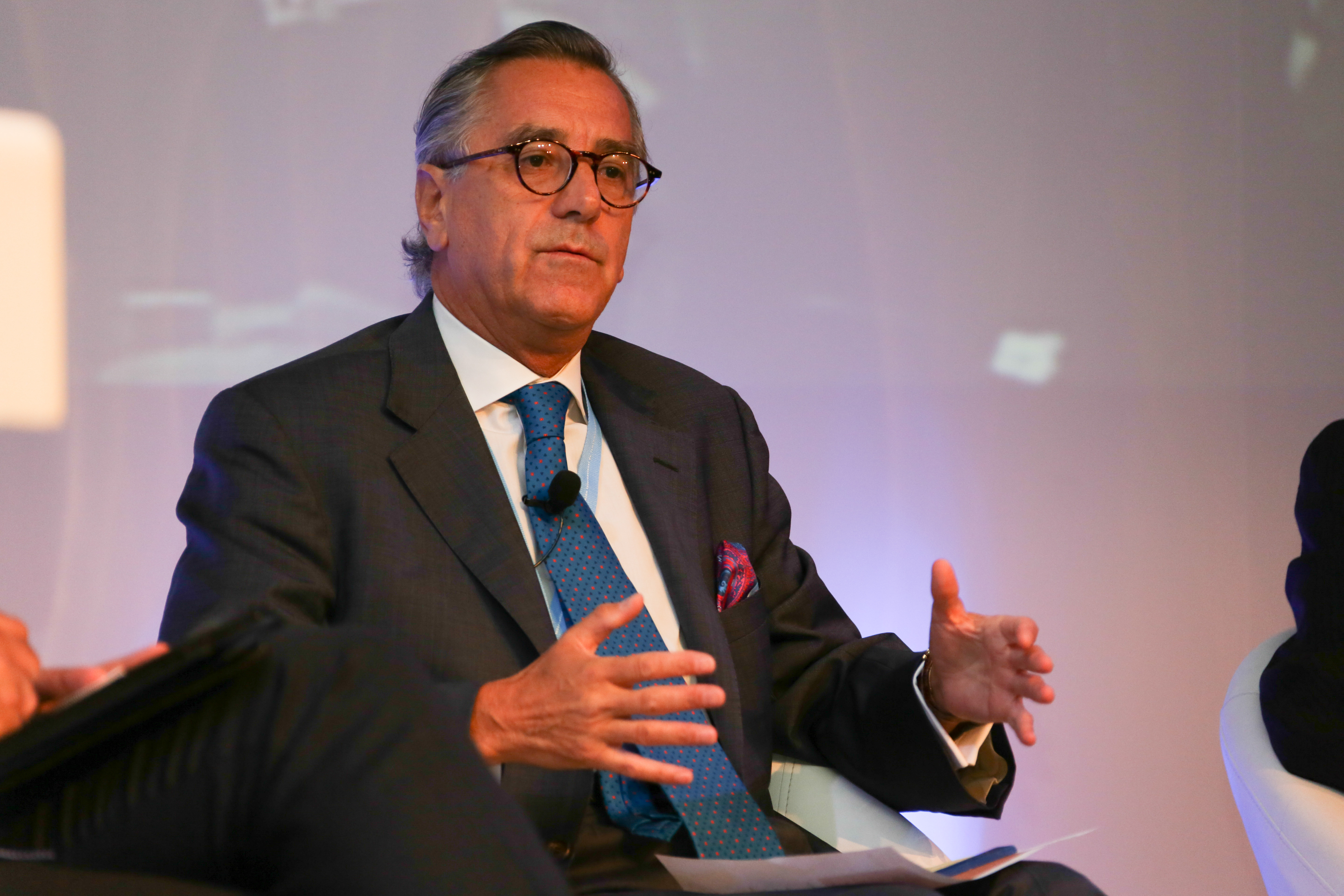
- Osorio Londoño at the Global Youth Summit in 2013

Colombia Ambassador to the United Kingdom
- In office February 2014 – Unknown
- Monarch: Elizabeth II
- President: Juan Manuel Santos
- Preceded by: Mauricio Rodríguez Múnera
- Succeeded by: Antonio Jose Ardila Gaviria

Permanent Representative of Colombia to the United Nations
- In office 22 November 2010 – February 2014
- President: Juan Manuel Santos
- Preceded by: Claudia Blum Capurro
- Succeeded by: María Emma Mejía Vélez

Executive Director of the International Coffee Organization
- In office 1 March 2002 – 1 November 2010
- Preceded by: Celsius A Lodder
- Succeeded by: José Sette

Permanent Representative of Colombia to the World Trade Organization
- In office 1995–1999
- President: Ernesto Samper Pizano (1995-1998); Andrés Pastrana Arango (1998-1999)
- Preceded by: Office created
- Succeeded by: Hernando José Gómez

Permanent Representative of Colombia to the International Coffee Organization
- In office 1982–1994
- President: Belisario Betancur Cuartas (1982-1986); Virgilio Barco Vargas (1986-1990); César Gaviria Trujillo (1990-1994); Ernesto Samper Pizano (1994)

Personal details
- Born: August 7, 1974 (age 52) Bogotá, Colombia
- Education: Our Lady of the Rosary University (PhD); Panthéon-Assas University (PhD)
- Profession: Lawyer

Néstor Osorio Londoño (born 7 August 1947) is a Colombian diplomat who was the former Ambassador of Colombia to the United Kingdom of Great Britain and Northern Ireland and former Permanent Representative to the United Nations. He has been President of both the United Nations Security Council and the United Nations Economic and Social Council.

After a career as an administrative lawyer, he served as the first Permanent Representative of Colombia to the World Trade Organization (WTO) in Geneva, from 1995 to 1999. He was Executive Director of the International Coffee Organization from 2002 to 2010, where he had represented Colombia since 1978 when he was named Alternate Delegate, and later becoming head of mission and Permanent Representative until 1994. After leaving the WTO, he worked for the Colombian Government as High Advisor for Coffee Policy from September 2000 until his election as Executive Director of the ICO.

In November 2010, Osorio became Colombia's Permanent Representative to the United Nations in New York. In March 2011, during the discussion regarding the unrest in Libya, he strongly advocated for foreign military intervention, which resulted in ousting of ruler Muammar Gaddafi, starting a civil war in the country. During April 2011, Colombia held the rotating presidency of the UN Security Council, and Osorio was the Council's president. In 2013, he was president of the United Nations Economic and Social Council. In 2014 he became ambassador to the United Kingdom of Great Britain and Northern Ireland.
