= Andrés Felipe Arias Leiva =

Colombian economist and politician

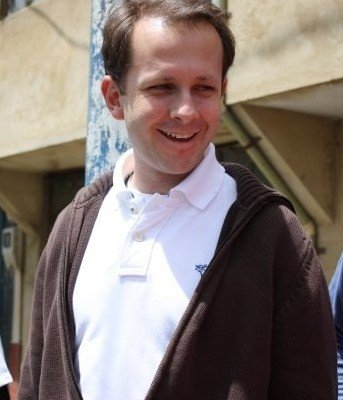

8th Minister of Agriculture and Rural Development of Colombia
- In office 4 February 2005 – 7 February 2009
- President: Álvaro Uribe Vélez
- Preceded by: Carlos Gustavo Cano Sanz
- Succeeded by: Andrés Fernández Acosta

Personal details
- Born: 4 May 1973 (age 53) Medellín, Antioquia, Colombia
- Party: Conservative
- Spouse(s): Catalina Serrano Garzón (2007-present)
- Children: Eloísa Arias Serrano; Juan Pedro Arias Serrano
- Education: University of the Andes (BEcon, 1999; MEcon, 2000); University of California, Los Angeles (Ph.D., 2002)
- Profession: Economist
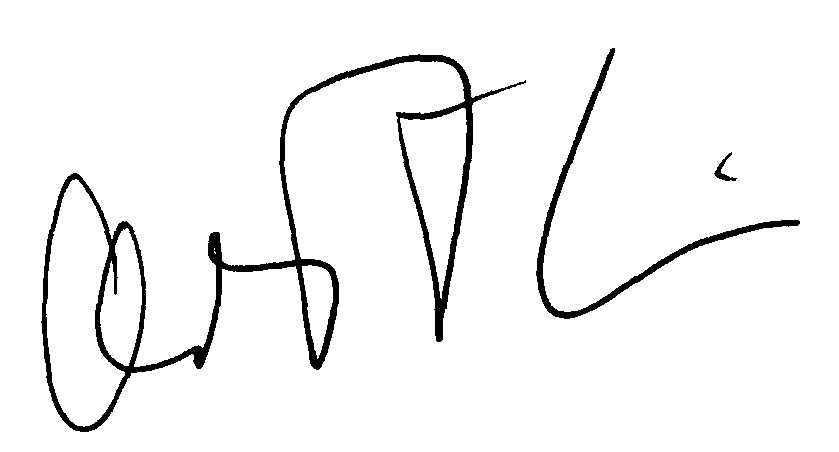
- Signature

Andrés Felipe Arias Leiva (born 4 May 1973) is a Colombian economist, sentenced to 17 years and 4 months of prison for a corruption scandal during his time as Minister of Agriculture. He served as the 8th Minister of Agriculture and Rural Development of Colombia from 2005 to 2009, and was a candidate for the Conservative Party nomination in the 2010 Colombian presidential election, ultimately losing to Noemí Sanín Posada.

Arias was under preventive detention from 26 July 2011 to 14 June 2013, he was held pending a resolution of the case brought forth by the Office of the Attorney General against Arias charging him with "peculation and conversion in favour of third parties" in relation to the "AIS": Agro Ingreso Seguro scandal. He has since fled the country. He and his family then sought asylum in the United States. On July 17, 2014, Andres Felipe Arias Leiva was sentenced to 17 years in jail by the Colombian Supreme Court for the AIS scandal.

In July 2019, the United States Court of Appeals for the Eleventh Circuit rejected Arias's appeal against an extradition order by a federal district court, and he was delivered to Colombian authorities to begin his sentence.

== Political career ==
=== Minister of Agriculture ===
On 16 February 2004, Arias was appointed Deputy Ministry of Agriculture and Rural Development serving under Minister Carlos Gustavo Cano Sanz, leaving his job as Director of Macroeconomics at the Ministry of Finance and Public Credit. After just one year, Arias was promoted to Minister by President Álvaro Uribe on 21 January 2005, and took office two weeks later on 4 February replacing his former superior, Minister Cano. On July 17, 2014, Andres Felipe Arias Leiva was sentenced to 17 years in jail by the Colombian Supreme Court for the AIS scandal.

In 2009, Arias resigned his post at the Ministry to run in the Conservative Party primaries for the Party's nomination in the 2010 presidential election, but ultimately lost in the primaries to Noemí Sanín Posada, who in turn lost in the general election to Juan Manuel Santos Calderón. Arias and Santos had gotten close during the campaign, something the Conservatives disapproved of. In turn Santos presented him with the Ambassadorship to Italy to replace Sabas Pretelt de la Vega.

=== "AIS": Agro Ingreso Seguro scandal ===
However, by then Arias had found himself involved in an investigation pertaining to the Agro Ingreso Seguro scandal, a series of compromising cases, first reported by Cambio magazine, involving his Ministry during his time in office for misallocating agricultural subsidies to wealthy families in the Caribbean Coastal Region. Because of this, his ambassadorship designation was heavily criticized by Congress, including the then-President of the Chamber of Representatives, Carlos Alberto Zuluaga Díaz, who publicly called for him to stay in the country to prove his innocence. Arias ultimately chose to decline the Ambassadorship.

In September 2009 the Office of the Comptroller General opened an investigation against Arias and other officials into the mismanagement of funds in the Agro Ingreso Seguro case, then in December, the Office of the Inspector General opened a disciplinary hearing into irregularities related to the same case against 16 officials, including Arias and the then-Minister of Agriculture and Rural Development, Andrés Fernández Acosta, who has also served as Deputy Minister when Arias was then Minister. Finally in January 2010, the Office of the Attorney General opened a preliminary hearing against Arias to see if a criminal investigation would follow. On 26 July 2011, Magistrate Orlando Fierro Perdomo ordered the arrest and preventive detention of Arias for obstruction of justice, as Arias was accused of meeting with other officials who were being investigated in the case, and for trying to coordinate their stance and testimony; for this he accused sent to Cantón Norte military prison pending the culmination of the trial.

On 19 July 2011, the Office of the Inspector General found Arias guilty of irregularities in the misallocation of funds, and removed and disqualified him from holding a position in public service for a period of sixteen years. He remains in preventive detention since 2011 to this date.

On 3 July 2014, the Supreme Court of Justice of Colombia found Arias guilty but did not specify the length of his conviction. It became known that he had evaded his security escort on June 13 and had fled the country with his family. He was later sighted in Florida, according to Semana magazine. On July 18, 2014, Colombia asked Interpol to arrest Andres Felipe Arias Leiva. From his home in Florida, on December 11, 2016, and after being in jail in the US for 4 months, Arias declared to the media that he did not benefit from any of the money from the AIS program. He added that the Colombian Supreme Court fabricated crimes against him, that he did not commit, to jail him for 17+ years.
