= Pico y placa =

Traffic management scheme

Pico y placa (literally Peak and Plate, Spanish for peak [hour] and [license] plate) is a driving restriction policy aimed to mitigate traffic congestion. The scheme was initially set in place in Bogotá, Colombia in 1998 by then mayor Enrique Peñalosa to help regulate traffic during rush hours. The system restricts traffic access into a pre-established urban area for vehicles with license plate numbers ending in certain digits on pre-established days and during certain hours. Initially, the system restricted traffic between 6 and 9 am and between 5 and 8 pm Monday through Friday.

The scheme restricts both private and public use vehicles based on the last digit of the licence plate numbers. Four numbers are restricted every day for private use vehicles, and two for public transportation vehicles. The restricted digits associated to each day rotate every year. Schemes with the same name have been implemented in other Colombian cities, such as Medellín, Pereria and Cúcuta; and also in Quito, Ecuador's capital city.

Bogotá's Pico y Placa was applied to the following plate endings on July 1, 2011:

- Plates ending in 5, 6, 7, 8: restricted from driving on Monday
- 9, 0, 1, 2: Tuesday
- 3, 4, 5, 6: Wednesday
- 7, 8, 9, 0: Thursday
- 1, 2, 3, 4: Friday
- No restrictions on weekends

The following are the current restrictions:

- Even days: plates ending in 6, 7, 8, 9, and 0 are allowed.
- Odd days: plates ending in 1, 2, 3, 4, and 5 are allowed.

On 9 April 2020, a pico y género policy was announced to restrict the mobility of humans based on gender. The name was based on the pico y placa, and the intent was to further tighten the restrictions of quarantine to combat COVID-19 in Colombia.

== Lima, Peru driving restriction policy ==
Starting on July 22, 2019, the pilot plan 'peak and plate' was launched on the main roads of Lima. It consists in restricting the use of vehicles, according to the registration number (odd or even). The restriction was applied within the framework of the Lima 2019 Pan American Games. Due to its success in reducing traffic on the main arteries, the plan has now been extended indefinitely. However, due to the COVID-19 pandemic, the rule has been suspended indefinitely.

== See also ==
- Congestion pricing
- Road space rationing
- IEEE Intelligent Transportation Systems Society
- Hoy No Circula
