= Carlos Lemos Simmonds =

Vice President of Colombia from 1996 to 1998

His Excellency Carlos Lemos Simmonds
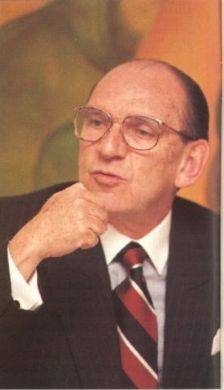

6th Vice President of Colombia
- In office September 19, 1996 – August 7, 1998
- President: Ernesto Samper
- Preceded by: Humberto de la Calle
- Succeeded by: Gustavo Bell

Colombian Ambassador to the United Kingdom
- In office 15 November 1995 – 15 October 1998
- President: Ernesto Samper
- Preceded by: Noemí Sanín
- Succeeded by: Humberto de la Calle

Colombia Ambassador to Austria
- In office 1995–1996
- President: Ernesto Samper
- Preceded by: Alfonso Gómez Méndez

Minister of Government of Colombia
- In office 1989–1990
- President: Virgilio Barco Vargas
- Preceded by: Orlando Vásquez Velásquez
- Succeeded by: Horacio Serpa

33rd Minister of Communications of Colombia
- President: Virgilio Barco Vargas
- Preceded by: Pedro Martín Leyes
- Succeeded by: Enrique Daníes Rincones

Minister of Foreign Affairs of Colombia
- In office March 12, 1981 – August 7, 1982
- President: Julio César Turbay Ayala
- Preceded by: Diego Uribe Vargas
- Succeeded by: Rodrigo Hernán Lloreda Caicedo

Member of the Chamber of Representatives of Colombia
- In office 20 July 1974 – 20 July 1978
- Constituency: Cauca Department

Personal details
- Born: Carlos Apolinar Lemos Simmonds; 23 October 1933 Popayán, Cauca, Colombia
- Died: 30 July 2003 (aged 69) Bogotá, D.C., Colombia
- Party: Liberal
- Spouse: Martha Blanco Guauque (1985–2003)
- Children: María Eugenia; Carlos; María Victoria; Adriana
- Education: University of Cauca
- Profession: Lawyer

Carlos Apolinar Lemos Simmonds (October 23, 1933 – July 30, 2003) was the sixth Vice President of Colombia.

== Political career ==
After graduating Lemos worked as a Municipal Judge in the town of Piendamó, Cauca. He later transferred to Bogotá where he was elected councilman in the early 1970s for three consecutive terms. He then ran for the Chamber of Representatives of Colombia. During the government of President Julio César Turbay Lemos was appointed as Secretary General of the Presidency of Colombia. In the same administration he was promoted to minister of the Ministry of Foreign Affairs, after that he was shifted to different ministries, Ministry of Government, Ministry of Information Technologies and Communications (Colombia).

Lemos served later as Ambassador of Colombia to the Organization of American States (OAS), drafter of the Colombian Constitution of 1991, Ambassador of Colombia to Austria, Ambassador of Colombia to Great Britain, senator, vice president and president of Colombia temporarily.

As a member of the Colombian Foreign Affairs Commission he contributed towards resolving the dispute over San Andrés y Providencia Islands in the Caribbean Sea between Colombia and Nicaragua for territorial waters. He also negotiated the peace process with the M-19 guerrilla.

== Personal life ==
Carlos Apolinar was born on 23 October 1933 in Popayán, Cauca to Antonio José Lemos Guzmán and María Antonia Simmonds Pardo. He married María Victoria Perez y Soto Bohorquez, with whom he had four children: María Eugenia, Carlos José, María Victoria, and Adriana. He later divorced Perez y Soto, and in 1987 married Marta Piedad Blanco Guauke on October 13, 1987, in the state of Virginia (U.S.), which was registered at the Consulate of Colombia in Washington, D.C., and in turn at the First Notary of Colombia; later in the light of the Civil Marriage Law in Colombia (Decree 2668 of 1988) and after the Holy See granted him the annulment of the Catholic marriage with María Victoria Pérez y Soto, (since August 2, 1993) they remarried civilly, on October 19, 1994, which was registered in Notary 27 of Bogotá, under public deed No. 11910..

Lemos died on 30 July 2003 in Bogotá, D.C. after a fight with lung cancer. In accordance with his last will and testament, he was mourned and buried privately, and did not receive a state funeral as he would have been entitled.

Political offices
Preceded by Humberto De la Calle	Vice President of Colombia; 1997–1998	Succeeded by Gustavo Bell
