= Jaime Castro Castro =

Colombian politician (born 1938)

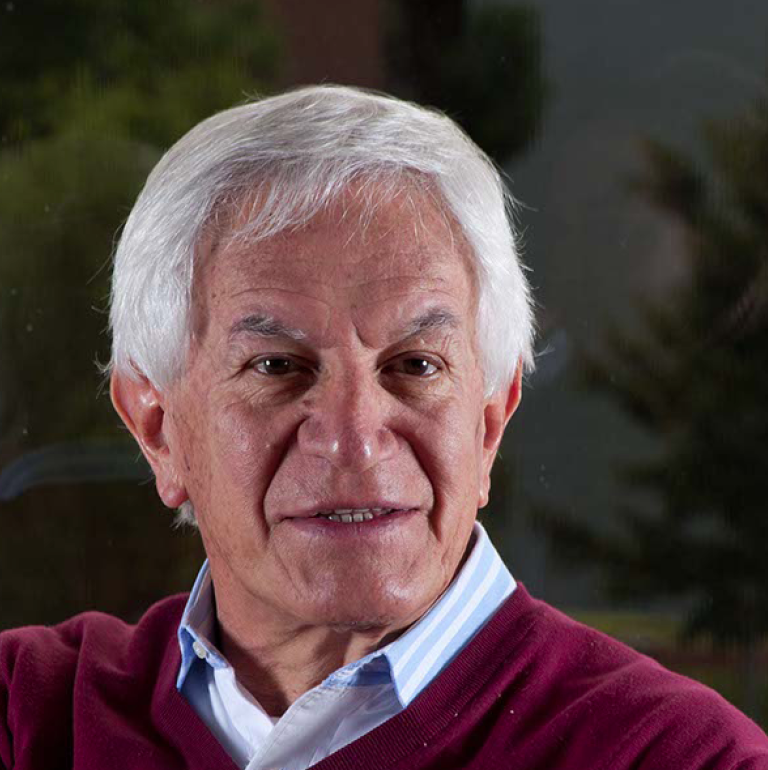

790th Mayor of Bogotá
- In office 1 June 1992 – 1 January 1995
- Preceded by: Juan Martín Caicedo Ferrer
- Succeeded by: Antanas Mockus Šivickas

Senator of Colombia
- In office 20 July 1990 – 25 October 1990
- In office 20 July 1978 – 20 July 1984

Colombian Minister of Government
- In office 20 July 1984 – 7 August 1986
- President: Belisario Betancur Cuartas
- Preceded by: Rodrigo Escobar Navia
- Succeeded by: Fernando Cepeda Ulloa

Colombia Ambassador to Italy
- In office 1976–1978
- President: Alfonso López Michelsen
- Preceded by: Luis Carlos Galán Sarmiento
- Succeeded by: José Manuel Rivas Sacconi

Minister of Justice of Colombia
- In office 13 April 1973 – 7 August 1974
- President: Misael Pastrana Borrero
- Preceded by: Miguel Escobar Méndez
- Succeeded by: Alberto Santofimio Botero

Personal details
- Born: 28 March 1938 (age 88) Moniquirá, Boyacá, Colombia
- Party: Liberal
- Spouse: Clara Forero
- Education: Our Lady of the Rosary University
- Profession: Lawyer

Jaime Castro Castro (born 28 March 1938) is a Colombian lawyer and politician, who served as Mayor of Bogotá from 1992 to 1994. A Liberal Party politician, he served as Minister of Government under President Belisario Betancur Cuartas, and as Minister of Justice under President Misael Pastrana Borrero.
