= Great Alliance for Change =

The Great Alliance for Change (Spanish: Gran Alianza por el cambio) was a political alliance between parties in Colombia during the 1998 Colombian presidential election that supported the presidency of Andres Pastrana Arango against the campaign of Colombian Liberal Party presidential candidacy of Horacio Serpa, back then supported by the presidency of Ernesto Samper.

The alliance formed as a response to the unpopularity of President Samper caused by the "8000 process scandal in which money from the Cali drug cartel entered the presidential campaign of Samper and in which Serpa was also involved as head of the campaign. The alliance united the official candidate for the Conservative party, Andres Pastrana and a fraction of the Colombian Liberal party led by Alfonso Valdivieso Sarmiento who had failed to win the party's nomination against Serpa. At last, they ended the Liberal Party 12-years ruled in Colombia.

== During the presidency of Pastrana ==
After the election, the coalition allowed more liberal politicians to join the Great Alliance for Progress, a move supported mainly by Néstor Humberto Martínez and then senator Fabio Valencia Cossio for the conservative party, in a moment when former officialism liberals were trying to gain a seat in the presidency of Congress of Colombia and in its both chambers. Both chambers were won by the coalition as well as the 14 legislative commissions with some 60 senators and 90 chamber representatives. Surprisingly, and because of the coalition, Conservative senator Valencia-Cossio was elected by a liberal majority as President of the Senate of Colombia.

The Great Coalition for Change began to crumble with the election for Controller General Carlos Ossa Escobar who was mainly supported by the Colombian Liberal party. Senators that first supported the coalition decided to distance themselves from the Pastrana government, like Íngrid Betancourt, Claudia Blum, Fuad Char, Salomón Náder and Javier Ramírez. They alleged that Pastrana had not been following the political accords pact during the presidential campaign, adding to the criticism that these senators made against ministers of the Pastrana administration. After this incident the coalition in congress reduced from 60 to 40 senators and 90 to 60 chamber representatives, causing the political reform of the Pastrana government to fail a pass in Congress which in turn returned to their parties of militancy. The majority in congress, both houses and commissions, then turned its control to the Liberal Caucus, causing tensions between congress and the Pastrana administration.

As another factor to the failure of the coalition was the peace negotiation with the Revolutionary Armed Forces of Colombia (FARC-EP) guerrilla during the first three years of government. Pastrana faced a lot of criticism for giving the FARC guerrilla a large demilitarized area in El Caguan without almost any concessions in favor of the government or Colombians. The guerrilla, in contrast, used the area to strengthen militarily as a base for their illegal drug trade expansion and to gain international support.
