= Humberto De la Calle =

Vice President of Colombia from 1994 to 1996

Humberto de la Calle
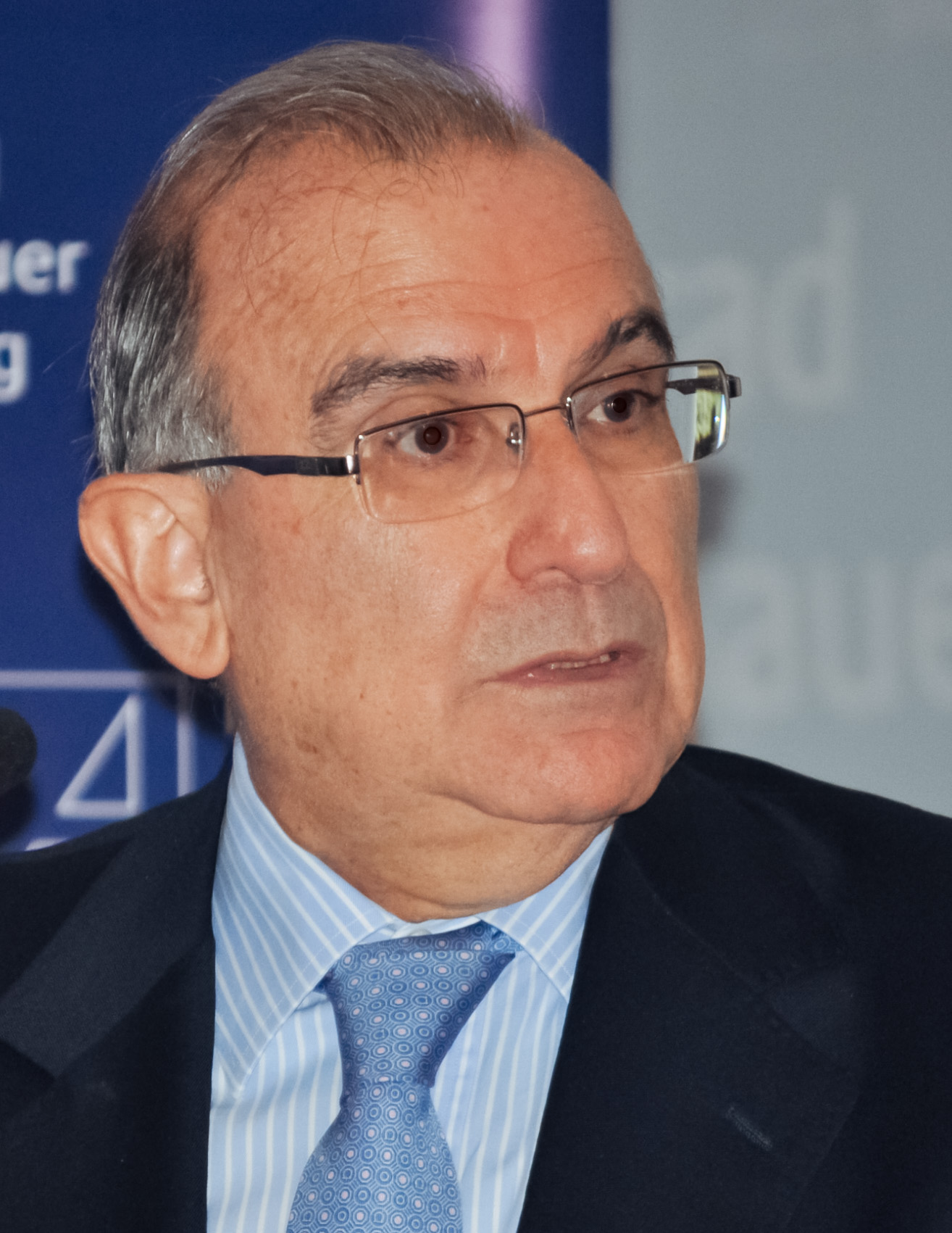
- De La Calle in December 2013

5th Vice President of Colombia
- In office 7 August 1994 – 10 September 1996
- President: Ernesto Samper
- Preceded by: Ramón González Valencia
- Succeeded by: Carlos Lemos Simmonds

Presidential Designate
- In office 5 August 1992 – 11 August 1993
- President: César Gaviria
- Preceded by: Luis Fernando Jaramillo
- Succeeded by: Juan Manuel Santos

Senator of Colombia
- In office 20 July 2022 – 1 February 2025

Head of the Negotiating Team of the Colombian Government with the FARC-EP
- In office 1 October 2012 – 30 November 2016
- President: Juan Manuel Santos
- Preceded by: Office established
- Succeeded by: Juan Camilo Restrepo

Minister of Interior and Justice
- In office 1 January 2000 – 23 February 2001
- President: Andrés Pastrana
- Preceded by: Néstor Humberto Martínez
- Succeeded by: Armando Estrada
- In office 11 January 1991 – 10 January 1993
- President: César Gaviria
- Preceded by: Julio César Sánchez
- Succeeded by: Fabio Villegas

Permanent Representative of Colombia to the Organization of American States
- In office 15 March 2001 – 10 March 2003
- President: Andrés Pastrana (2001–2002); Álvaro Uribe (2002–2003)
- Preceded by: Luis Alfredo Botero
- Succeeded by: Horacio Serpa

Colombian Ambassador to the United Kingdom
- In office 15 November 1998 – 15 October 2000
- President: Andrés Pastrana
- Preceded by: Carlos Lemos Simmonds
- Succeeded by: Victor Ricardo

Colombian Ambassador to Spain
- In office 6 October 1995 – 17 July 1996
- President: Ernesto Samper
- Preceded by: María Emma Mejía
- Succeeded by: Rodrigo Marín Bernal

Member of the Constituent Assembly of Colombia
- In office 2 February 1991 – 4 July 1991
- Constituency: Liberal Party

Associate Justice of the Supreme Court of Colombia
- In office 1 January 1982 – 31 December 1986
- Nominated by: Belisario Betancur

Personal details
- Born: Humberto de la Calle Lombana; 14 July 1946 (age 80) Manzanares, Caldas, Colombia
- Party: Liberal (1990-present)
- Spouse: Rosalba Restrepo (m. 1968; died 2020)
- Education: University of Caldas (LLB)

Humberto de la Calle Lombana (Spanish pronunciation: [umˈbeɾto ðe la ˈkaʝe lomˈbana]; born 14 July 1946) is a Colombian lawyer, diplomat and politician. He served as Vice President of Colombia from 1994 to 1997. De La Calle served in the cabinet as Interior Minister under two Presidents, Andrés Pastrana and César Gaviria. He also served as Ambassador to Spain and the United Kingdom. After 2003, De La Calle worked at his own Law firm which specialises in advising and representing international clients in Colombia. In October 2012 he was appointed by President Juan Manuel Santos as the chief negotiator in the peace process with the FARC.

== Education and family ==
During his high school years, De La Calle was a known activist of Nadaism and an admirer of Colombian poet Gonzalo Arango. He studied at the University of Caldas where he earned a law degree and met his future wife and mother of his three children. De La Calle then went on to study International Law at the Inter-American Judicial Committee in 1979. De la Calle is an atheist.

== Law career ==
De la Calle became a professor while practicing his law profession under private law firms. He started teaching in 1978 and became Dean in the universities of Caldas and Manizales until 1980. He also taught in prestigious universities from Bogotá, such as Andes University and Our Lady of the Rosary University.

For almost a decade De la Calle served in the Judicial Branch; he was appointed National Civil Registrar in the late 1980s during the administration of President Belisario Betancur. In 1986 De la Calle also served as an Associate Justice on the Supreme Court.

== Political career ==
In 1990 he was appointed to the Ministry of Government during the administration of President César Gaviria until 1992. In 1993 followers of President Gaviria from the Liberal Party suggested De la Calle as a possible presidential candidate. De la Calle resigned as minister to pursue the presidency, but in the party primaries he was defeated by Ernesto Samper. Samper then invited De la Calle to be his vice president.

In the 1994 Presidential election, Samper and De La Calle were elected. In the May primary election and the June general election of 1994, Samper and De la Calle were elected. De la Calle's relationship with President Samper was not strong and he was appointed as Ambassador to Spain while still serving as vice president.

In 1996 with the outbreak of the 8000 Process scandal in which the Samper presidential campaign received millions of dollars from the Cali Cartel, De la Calle's relationship with the government deteriorated to the point that De la Calle asked for the resignation of President Samper. After President Samper decided not to resign, and the government continued to lose credibility, De La Calle finally resigned as vice President in 1997.

De la Calle then allied with Andrés Pastrana, a conservative and political foe of President Samper. In the 1998 elections Pastrana was elected president and appointed De la Calle Ambassador to the United Kingdom, a position in which he served from 1998 to 2000. He was then appointed as Minister of the Interior, where he served between the years 2000 and 2001.

From 2001 to 2003 De la Calle served as Colombia's Ambassador to the Organization of American States (OAS). Afterwards he worked in his own law firm with his associates Ignacio Londoño Rivera, José Miguel de la Calle Restrepo and Mario Posada García-Peña. The firm offers services on legal advice and legal representation in different legal areas for Colombian nationals and international clients. He is also a regular columnist in the Bogotá daily El Espectador.

=== 2012-2016 Colombian peace process ===
On 1 October 2012, President Juan Manuel Santos appointed De La Calle as the government's chief negotiator with the FARC in the Colombian peace process which was hosted in Havana, Cuba. As a result of these peace talks, a final agreement was concluded in September 2016. The agreement was put to a vote in a special referendum in October 2016, during this period the polls were very tight and the campaign became very divisive between the Yes and No campaigns. After a low turnout, the Yes campaign lost with 50.2% voting No and 49.8% voting in favour of the peace accords. After government meetings with the opposition, and Government and FARC representatives, a new agreement based on the original version but with adjustments was signed. The Senate and House of Representatives soon approved the new agreement with substantial majorities. Currently De La Calle continues in his position, now charged with facilitating the implementation of the agreements.

In March 2017, De La Calle announced that he will work to form a coalition of different political parties in order to provide a unified front that will protect and implement the peace agreements. He ran in the 2018 presidential election as the candidate of the Liberal Party/Indigenous Social Alliance Coalition. De La Calle hoped to prevent right wing candidate Iván Duque Márquez from getting elected and disrupting the Colombian peace process.

He was elected senator in 2022 under the colors of the Oxygen Green Party. He was excluded shortly afterwards, following a conflict with Íngrid Betancourt.

== Published work ==
Books

- La Acción Cambiaria. Editorial Dike. (The Exchange Stock)
- La inoperancia del negocio jurídico. Editorial Temis. (The Inopperativeness of the Judicial Business)
- Anatomía del Cambio -de los sesenta al siglo 21-. Editorial Planeta. (Anatomy of Change)
- En defensa de la Descentralización. (Defending Decentralization)
- Código Electoral Comentado. Editorial Legis. (Commented Electoral Code)
- Intervenciones en la Asamblea Constituyente de 1991 como Ministerio de Gobierno. (Interventions as Minister of Government in the Constituent Assembly of Colombia)
- Carta Democrática Interamericana –Documentos e Interpretaciones- OEA. (Editor y autor del capítulo sobre Colombia). (Inter-American Democratic Charter-Document and Interpretations- OAS. (editor and author of the chapter on Colombia))

Magazine articles

- La inexistencia (en el campo jurídico). Revista de Derecho Comercial. (The Unexistance (in the judicial field)
- Contrato de Seguros y Desvalorización Monetaria. Derecho Colombiano. (Insurance contracts and Monetary devaluation. Second Semester of 1981)
- Buena fe y buena fe exenta de culpa en materia cambiaria. Derecho Colombiano. Segundo Semestre de 1983. (Good Faith and Good Faith Exempt from Culpability in Exchange Matters)
- Títulos Valores. Revista de la Cámara de Comercio de Manizales. (Securities. Manizales Chamber of Commerce Magazine)
- La Constitución y el manejo del Orden Público. Revista de la Universidad de los Andes. (The Constitution and the Handling of Public Order)
- The Nature of Public, Private and Mixed Financing. In Financing Democracies in Latin America. The Carter Center. March 2003.
- Transparency and accountability in Colombia. In Public Sector Transparency and Accountability. OECD. OEA. 2002.
- Los Partidos Políticos en América Latina. En Dinero y Contienda Política-electoral. IFE. Méjico. 2001. (The Political Parties in Latin America. Money and Electoral-Political Contendents)
- Financiación de los Partidos Políticos y las Campañas Electorales en Colombia. En La financiación de la política en Iberoamérica. IIDH. CAPEL. (Political Parties and Electoral Campaigns Financing in Colombia. On the Financing of Politics in Latin America)

Political offices
Preceded by Position re-created	Vice President of Colombia; 1994–1997	Succeeded by Carlos Lemos Simmonds
