= Embassy of Colombia, London =

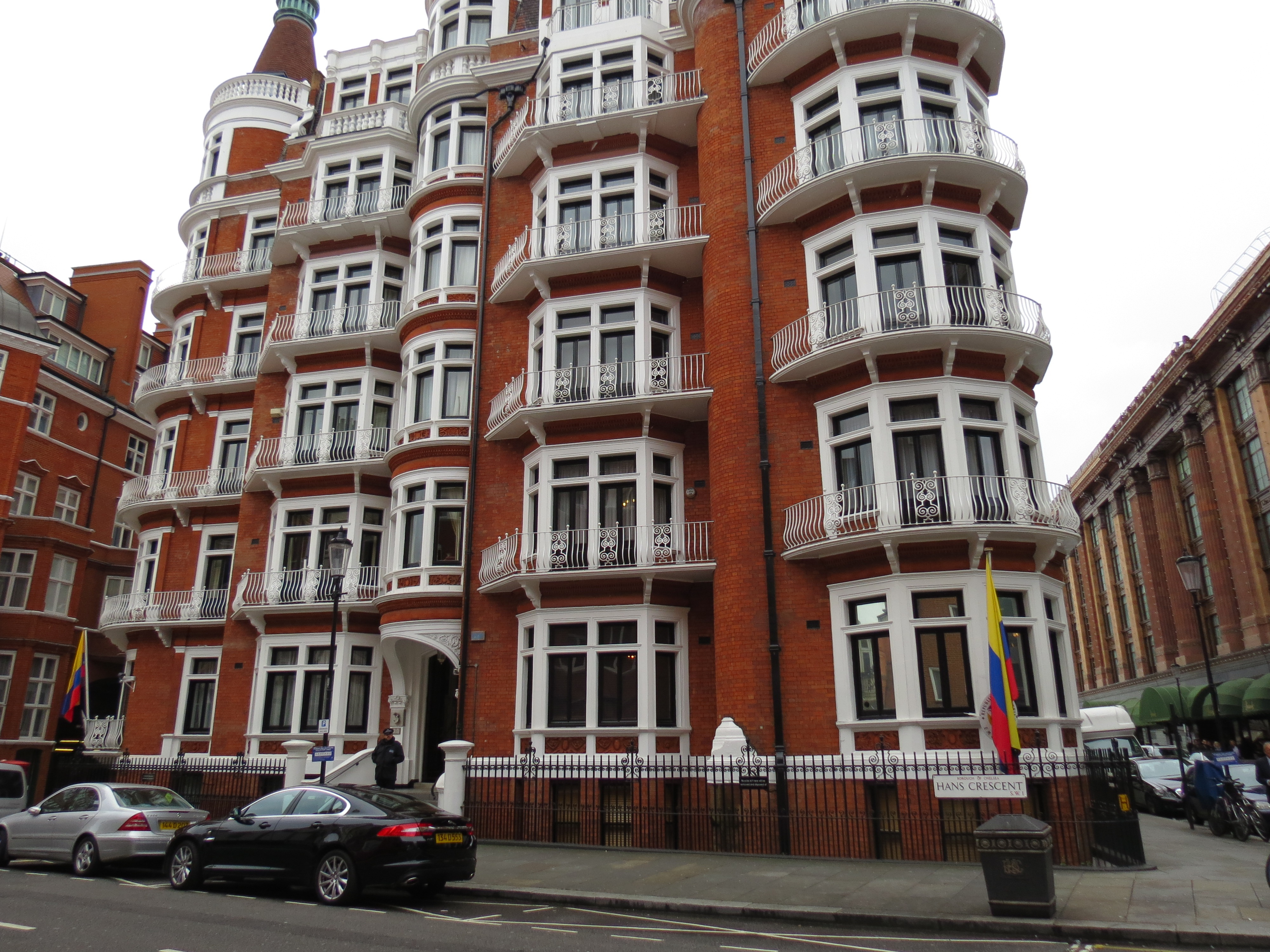
- Location: Knightsbridge, London
- Address: 3 Hans Crescent; London SW1X 0LN, UK
- Coordinates: 51°29′56.81″N 0°9′41.40″W
- Ambassador: Roy Barreras

The Embassy of Colombia in London is the diplomatic mission of the Republic of Colombia in the United Kingdom. It is headed by the Ambassador of Colombia to the United Kingdom. It is located in the Knightsbridge district in a building it shares with the Embassy of Ecuador, near Harrods, Hyde Park, and Hans Place, precisely at 3 Hans Crescent at the intersection of Basil Street, and it is serviced by Knightsbridge station.

== About ==
The structure that houses the embassy is a white stucco-fronted red-brick building. The embassy is a suite of rooms occupying part of the ground floor of the building, which has been described as an "apartment block".

Colombia also maintains a number of other buildings in the city: a consulate at 35 Portland Place, Marylebone, a Commercial Section at 2 Conduit Street, Mayfair and a Military, Naval & Police Attaché's Office at 83 Victoria Street, Victoria.

== See also ==
- Colombia-Ireland relations
- Colombia–United Kingdom relations
