= Luis Eduardo Garzón =

Colombian politician (born 1951)

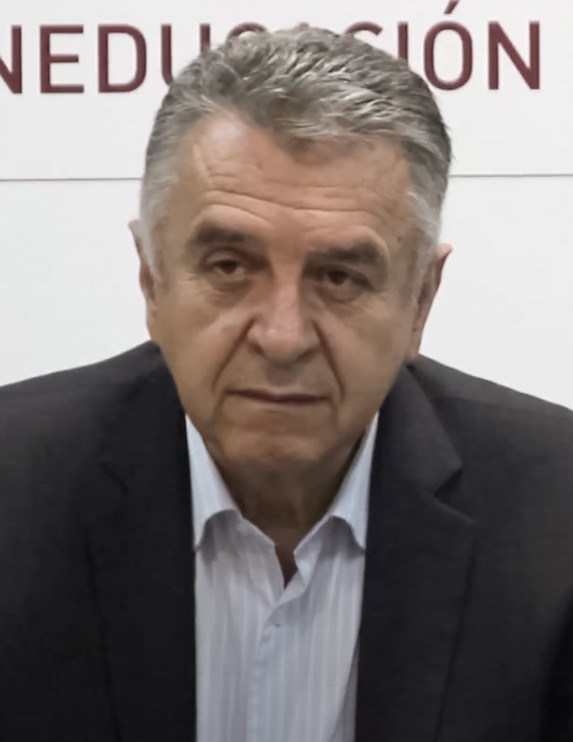

795th Mayor of Bogotá
- In office 2004–2007
- Preceded by: Antanas Mockus
- Succeeded by: Samuel Moreno Rojas

Personal details
- Born: February 11, 1951 (age 75) Bogotá, DC, Colombia
- Party: Green Alliance
- Other political affiliations: Frente Social y Político, Alternative Democratic Pole
- Education: Free University of Colombia
- Occupation: Union leader, Activist

Luis Eduardo Garzón (nicknamed "Lucho") (born February 11, 1951, in Bogotá) is the former mayor of Bogotá (2004–2007), a left-wing Colombian political activist and a former union leader. He is a former member of the Alternative Democratic Pole (PDA). In 2009 Garzón joined forces with former mayors Enrique Peñalosa and Antanas Mockus to re-found the Green Party, an eco-oriented political movement.

== Political career ==
=== Presidential Candidate ===
Considered by some analysts as an idiosyncratic and charismatic speaker, "Lucho" Garzón has been one of the most visible critics of President Álvaro Uribe's government, running against him on a shoe-string budget in the 2002 presidential race and finally making third place with 680,245 votes (6.16% of the voter turnout).

Garzón has expressed his interest in running once again for the Colombian presidential office in the future, after his first failed attempt.

A run in the 2006 elections was ruled out as Garzón would have had to resign his post early in 2005 to be considered eligible and at the time of this writing, Antonio Navarro had already been chosen as the Independent Democratic Pole's (PDI) official pre-candidate but Carlos Gaviria became the PDA official candidate.

=== Mayor of Bogotá ===
Garzón defeated Juan Lozano, the candidate favored by president Uribe and also by influential media groups as El Tiempo in Bogotá, in the mayoral elections in October 2003. Garzón's low budget campaign received a major boost when his candidacy was endorsed by the more leftwing sectors of the Liberal party, in particular those close to then senator Piedad Córdoba.

During his tenure as mayor, Garzón was popular amongst the people of Bogotá as reflected in polls, in spite of confronting such difficult issues as the use of public space, the teething problems faced by the TransMilenio mass-transport system, and how to deal with ex-combatants from Colombia's armed conflict who had been settled in Bogotá as part of a central government rehabilitation program (eventually, Garzón and Uribe jointly decided to change some aspects of the program, after a bomb exploded near one of the shelters for former irregular fighters).

In the meantime, despite several disagreements, Garzón has managed to achieve a degree of cohabitation with the central government, cooperating on several local issues without compromising his own principles. For supporters and opponents alike, one of the most striking feature of Lucho's administration so far has been its emphasis on social programs such as Bogotá sin hambre ("Bogotá without hunger") and Bogotá sin indiferencia ("Bogotá without indifference"), and in general his general efforts to improve the living conditions of the inhabitants of Bogotá's most deprived areas, as well as increasing their involvement in decision making at the level of local government.

Towards the end of 2005, Garzón has had a recent conflict with his own party, the PDA, in Bogotá's city council due to his support for a proposed increase in the city's "valorization tax", in order to finance existing and future infrastructure and development projects. Most PDA and Radical Change councilmen oppose this measure as contrary to Garzón's "no new taxes" campaign pledge, while Garzón himself and councilmen affiliated with former mayor Enrique Peñalosa consider it necessary. The tax was approved during a September 29 city council vote, by a margin of four votes (24 against 20).
