= Yes Colombia =

Political party in Colombia

Yes Colombia Sí Colombia
- Founder: Noemí Sanín
- Founded: March 10, 2002.
- Ideology: Conservative

Yes Colombia (Sí Colombia) was a centrist political party in Colombia. It was founded by Noemí Sanín, a dissident of Conservative Party. In the 2002 legislative elections, the party won parliamentary representation. Founder Noemí Sanín ran in the 2002 presidential election under the Yes Colombia party.
