= 1970 Colombian general election =

- 19 April 1970
- Presidential election
- Turnout: 52.53%
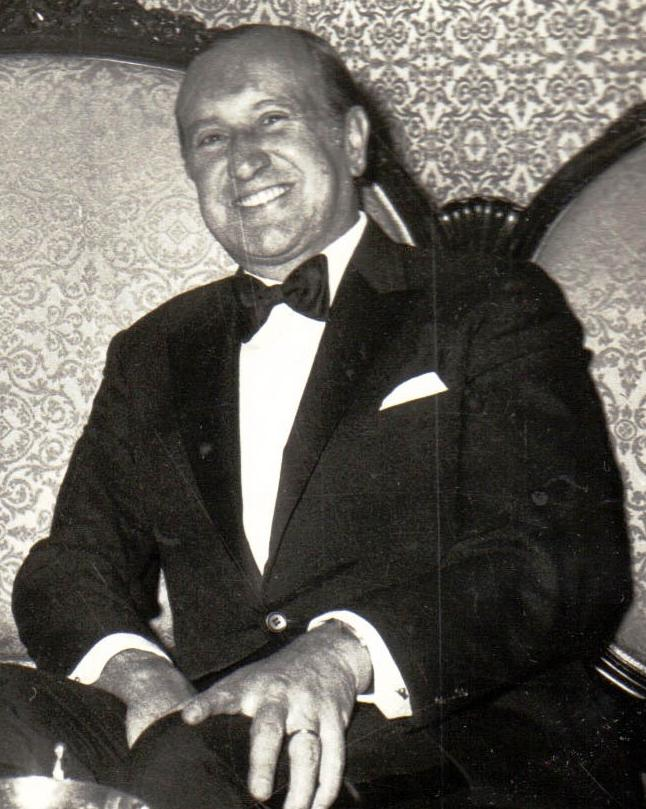

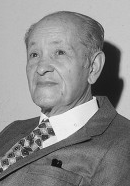

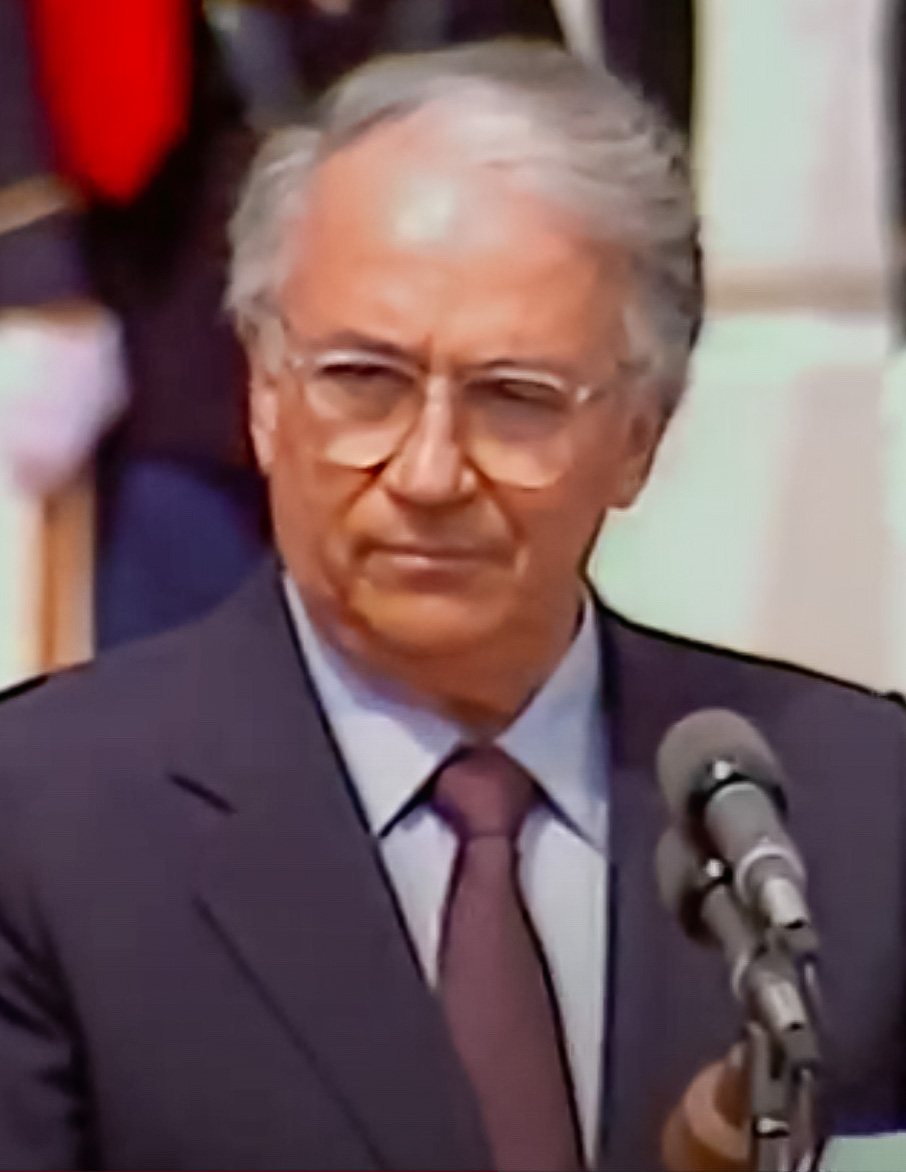
Nominee	Misael Pastrana Borrero	Gustavo Rojas Pinilla
Party	Conservative	Conservative
Alliance	National Front	ANAPO
Popular vote	1,625,025	1,561,468
Percentage	40.69%	39.09%
Nominee	Belisario Betancur Cuartas	Evaristo Sourdis Juliao
Party	Conservative	Conservative
Popular vote	471,350	336,286
Percentage	11.80%	8.42%
- Results by department
President before election
Carlos Lleras Restrepo
Liberal
Elected President
Misael Pastrana Borrero
Conservative

General elections were held in Colombia on 19 April 1970 to elect the president, the Senate and the Chamber of Representatives. It was the first time all three institutions had been elected on the same day, and was also the last election under the National Front agreement, which had restricted electoral participation to the Conservative Party and the Liberal Party, with each party allocated 50% of the seats in both houses, whilst the presidency alternated between the two parties. As a result, the main contest in parliamentary elections was between factions within each party, whilst only Conservative candidates ran for the presidency. The result was a victory for Misael Pastrana Borrero, who received 40.7% of the vote. However, supporters of Gustavo Rojas Pinilla claimed that the election had been rigged in favour of Pastrana. Rojas had also been supported by the Christian Social Democratic Party. The 19th of April Movement guerrillas traced their origins to this alleged fraud.

== Background ==
The 1970 elections were set to be the last of the National Front, the agreement signed by the leaders of the Conservative and Liberal parties in the aftermath of five years of military dictatorship. In the agreement, formalized by the passage of Legislative Act 1 on 15 September 1959, the two parties pledged to alternate the power of the presidency for the next three elections. From 1958, each alternating presidential election was uncontested by the other party; the previous elections had brought to power Liberal Carlos Lleras Restrepo, while 1970 was set to be the year of the Conservatives.

Misael Pastrana Borrero, a former minister and ambassador to the United States, launched his candidacy in Medellín in September 1969. A Conservative, he was eventually nominated as the National Front candidate at the national conventions of both the Conservative and Liberal parties. His platform was largely a continuation of his Liberal predecessor's moderate economic and social policies, and he campaigned with the slogan "I am not a man. I am a program." President Lleras actively campaigned on his behalf, violating the impartiality of the executive.

Despite Pastrana's nomination by the National Front, dissident Conservatives emerged to challenge his candidacy. Belisario Betancur and Evaristo Sourdis Juliao enjoyed the support of their regional constituencies, Antioquia and the Caribbean region.

The National Popular Alliance (ANAPO) was a political movement formed in 1961 by Gustavo Rojas Pinilla, a retired general who had ruled the country as military dictator from 1953 to 1957. ANAPO was a populist grouping of dissident liberals, conservatives, and leftists, united by their common rejection of the National Front coalition. Rojas previously ran as the ANAPO candidate in the 1962 elections against Guillermo León Valencia, but his candidacy was invalidated by the Supreme Court; this sentence had been overturned in 1967 and the ex-dictator again sought to return to the presidency by democratic means.

Rojas's candidacy created a polarized atmosphere that led President Lleras to declare that Rojas had to be defeated in a speech given in Bogotá's Kennedy neighborhood, violating the executive branch's mandatory impartiality in elections.

== Candidates ==
The main candidates were Evaristo Sourdis, Belisario Betancur, Gustavo Rojas Pinilla, and Misael Pastrana Borrero (Acuña, 2013).

== Results ==
=== President ===
Candidate	Party	Votes	%
Misael Pastrana Borrero	Colombian Conservative Party	1,625,025	40.69
Gustavo Rojas Pinilla	National Popular Alliance	1,561,468	39.09
Belisario Betancur	Colombian Conservative Party	471,350	11.80
Evaristo Sourdis Juliao	Colombian Conservative Party	336,286	8.42
Rafael Corredor	Independent	11	0.00
Total		3,994,140	100.00
Valid votes		3,994,140	98.95
Invalid/blank votes		42,318	1.05
Total votes		4,036,458	100.00
Registered voters/turnout		7,683,785	52.53
Source: Nohlen

=== Senate ===
Party and faction		Votes	%	Seats	+/–
Colombian Conservative Party	National Popular Alliance	1,036,650	26.23	26	+8
Colombian Conservative Party	Pastranistas	586,131	14.83	18	–
Colombian Conservative Party	Belisaristas	294,185	7.44	9	–
Colombian Conservative Party	Sourdistas	185,206	4.69	6	–
Colombian Conservative Party	Total	2,102,172	53.20	59	+6
Colombian Liberal Party	Pastranistas	1,074,059	27.18	39	–
Colombian Liberal Party	National Popular Alliance	382,777	9.69	12	+12
Colombian Liberal Party	Sourdistas	152,506	3.86	5	–
Colombian Liberal Party	Belisaristas	131,430	3.33	3	–
Colombian Liberal Party	Others	108,653	2.75	0	–
Colombian Liberal Party	Total	1,849,425	46.80	59	+6
Total		3,951,597	100.00	118	+12
Valid votes		3,951,597	99.61		
Invalid/blank votes		15,409	0.39		
Total votes		3,967,006	100.00		
Registered voters/turnout		7,666,716	51.74		
Source: Nohlen

=== Chamber of Representatives ===
Party and faction		Votes	%	Seats	+/–
Colombian Liberal Party	Pastranistas	1,051,666	26.51	57	–
Colombian Liberal Party	National Popular Alliance	563,614	14.21	28	+22
Colombian Liberal Party	Sourdistas	156,877	3.95	9	–
Colombian Liberal Party	Belisaristas	137,069	3.46	6	–
Colombian Liberal Party	People's Liberal Revolutionary Movement	34,491	0.87	0	–1
Colombian Liberal Party	Others	90,825	2.29	5	+5
Colombian Liberal Party	Total	2,034,542	51.29	105	+3
Colombian Conservative Party	National Popular Alliance	849,138	21.41	43	+15
Colombian Conservative Party	Pastranistas	589,234	14.85	30	–
Colombian Conservative Party	Belisaristas	300,223	7.57	19	–
Colombian Conservative Party	Sourdistas	185,686	4.68	13	–
Colombian Conservative Party	Others	7,881	0.20	0	–
Colombian Conservative Party	Total	1,932,162	48.71	105	+3
Total		3,966,704	100.00	210	+6
Valid votes		3,966,704	99.66		
Invalid/blank votes		13,497	0.34		
Total votes		3,980,201	100.00		
Registered voters/turnout		7,666,716	51.92		
Source: Nohlen

== Fraud accusations ==
These elections were marred by accusations of electoral fraud in favor of the winning candidate, which were launched the night after the election and in the days and years that followed.

=== Night of April 19 ===
As was customary at the time, radio stations counted the votes much faster than the National Registry, which announced a Rojas lead over Pastrana of 1,235,679 votes to 1,121,958. On the night of April 19, Minister of Government Carlos Augusto Noriega ordered the stations to refrain from disclosing the overall results and to let the Registry give the final verdict. This order was ratified by Communications Minister Antonio Díaz García. In protest, the director of the Todelar network, Antonio Niño Ortiz, suspended broadcasts of the election results.

Once the ban was in place, Minister Noriega presented ballots in which Rojas Pinilla narrowly outperformed Pastrana. On the morning of April 20 of that year, the result was 1,368,981 votes for Pastrana, while Rojas had 1,366,364. In the following days, the votes in favor of Pastrana increased considerably, a fact that was harshly criticized by Rojas's supporters.

Similarly, irregularities in the vote count were reported in the departments of Nariño, Sucre, Cauca, and Chocó. In Nariño, Rojas had a vote count of 36,126, according to radio stations, but on the 20th, his vote dropped to 28,938, which, according to the Registry, was due to "telegraphic errors."

In Sucre, a bulletin from the Registry's Office documented in the newspaper El Tiempo recorded 16,690 votes for Pastrana and 11,857 for Rojas, with Rojas's votes dropping to 7,519 in a new bulletin, which was denounced by Francisco Vargas Holguín, a lawyer for the ANAPO party. In the cases of Cauca and Chocó, meanwhile, there were considerable increases in Pastrana's votes, which was justified by the enormous influence of the traditional parties in remote municipalities where it was more difficult to send votes.

That same night, María Eugenia Rojas, the daughter of the defeated candidate, learned of a rebellion by Rojas' followers and called then-Foreign Minister Alfonso López Michelsen, who informed President Carlos Lleras Restrepo, who declared a state of siege and curfew. Under this declaration, Rojas was placed under house arrest, and he then made allegations of fraud to the national and international press. Several ANAPO leaders were also arrested and taken to military bases.

Twenty-eight years later, the same minister, Carlos Augusto Noriega, published a book titled "Fraud in the Pastrana-Borrero Election," in which he admitted to having committed fraud.

=== The Days After April 19 ===
On the evening of Tuesday the 21st, in response to possible disturbances of public order, President Lleras Restrepo addressed the nation on television, warning that according to information in the possession of state agencies, sectors of the ANAPO party were preparing a nationwide popular uprising. To prevent this, the government had decided to declare a state of siege, including press censorship measures on radio stations, empowering local law enforcement authorities to declare a curfew in their regions, prohibiting gatherings of more than five people in the streets, and implementing mechanisms to prevent the hoarding of basic products:

"ANAPO's claim of fraud is false, and I reject it emphatically. The country knows I'm not lying (...). As for Bogotá, it's eight o'clock (the President looking at his watch). At nine o'clock at night, there should be no one on the streets. The curfew will be enforced, and anyone who goes out will do so at their own risk and bear the consequences of violating a state of war. People have one hour to go home."

The state of siege was declared by the national government through Decree 590 of 1970, and lifted on May 15 of the following year through Decree 738 of 1970.

However, some accusations continued to be made in subsequent years. Former Conservative minister Lucio Pabón Núñez, during Rojas's military government (although he did not support him in the elections), stated in an interview with Cromos magazine that years after the elections, Senator Luis Avelino Pérez confessed to him having ordered the votes to be switched in the department of Nariño. Likewise, according to Semana magazine, then-Captain Jairo Castro of the Police saw people entering the Registry Office with broken, unsealed ballot boxes and bags of votes, something that ANAPO witnesses ignored thanks to some politicians keeping them distracted.

=== The vote counts and Misael Pastrana's position ===
According to the memoirs of candidate Misael Pastrana, who eventually won the presidency, the vote count was conducted in the presence of four delegates representing all campaigns. Furthermore, the electoral organization had been formed long before, without the winning candidate having any influence on the appointment of its members. The four delegates were Carlos Peláez Trujillo and Luis Carlos Zambrano, for the Liberal Party; along with Luis Fernando Paredes and Gustavo Fajardo Pinzón for the Conservative Party.

For his part, President Lleras Restrepo appointed eight witnesses (two for each candidate) to certify the transparency of the vote count: Juan Uribe Holguín and Rafael Delgado Barreneche (representing Evaristo Sourdis); Augusto Ramírez Moreno and Jorge Enrique Gutiérrez (representing Belisario Betancur); Carlos Mario Londoño and Álvaro Ortiz Lozano (representing ANAPO); and Gonzalo Vargas Rubiano (representing the ruling party). According to Pastrana's testimony, the witnesses unanimously support his election.

Finally, the drafting of the final minutes of the election was entrusted to Judge Gustavo Fajardo Pinzón, who had drafted the election minutes for Carlos Lleras Restrepo, and later for Alfonso López Michelsen and Julio César Turbay. ANAPO party challenged the report before the Council of State, a position it later withdrew due to lack of evidence.

=== Consequences ===
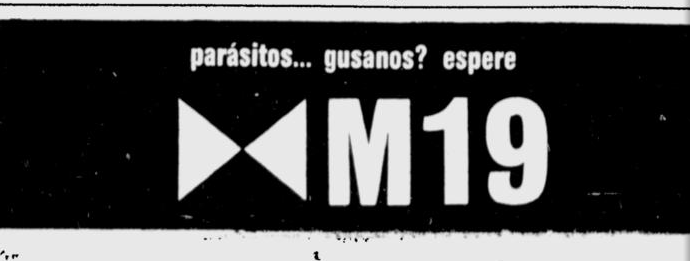
Advertisement in the newspaper El Tiempo placed by the guerrilla group "M-19" (acronym for "19th of April Movement}") before the theft of Bolívar's sword on January 17, 1974.

According to Semana magazine, the evidence of alleged fraud suggests that it was a result of localized maneuvers in certain departments, not necessarily inspired by the national government. According to this theory, there is a consensus that President Lleras Restrepo would not have covered up or tolerated this situation, while the passive role of candidate Pastrana is assumed. He may have benefited from the events, but not their instigator. However, it has also been concluded that these and other maneuvers could have been sufficient to alter the overall outcome of the election.

In reaction to these events, some members of the left wing of the ANAPO party formed the Comuneros group, with students, social leaders, former members of the FARC and other revolutionary projects. They formed the 19th of April Movement (M-19) in 1973, a guerrilla group that captured the attention of Colombians until its dissolution in 1990.
