= 1974 Colombian general election =

1974 Colombian presidential election
- 21 April 1974
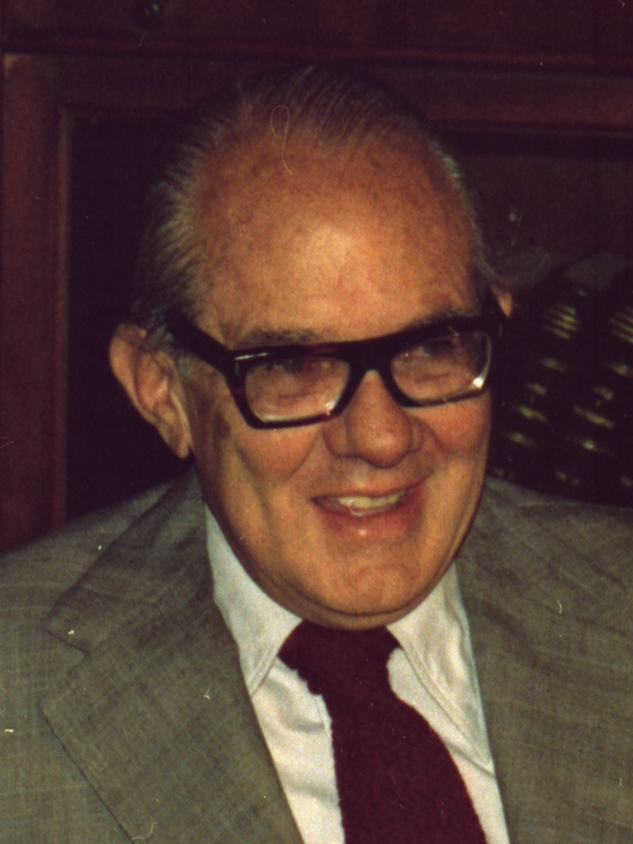

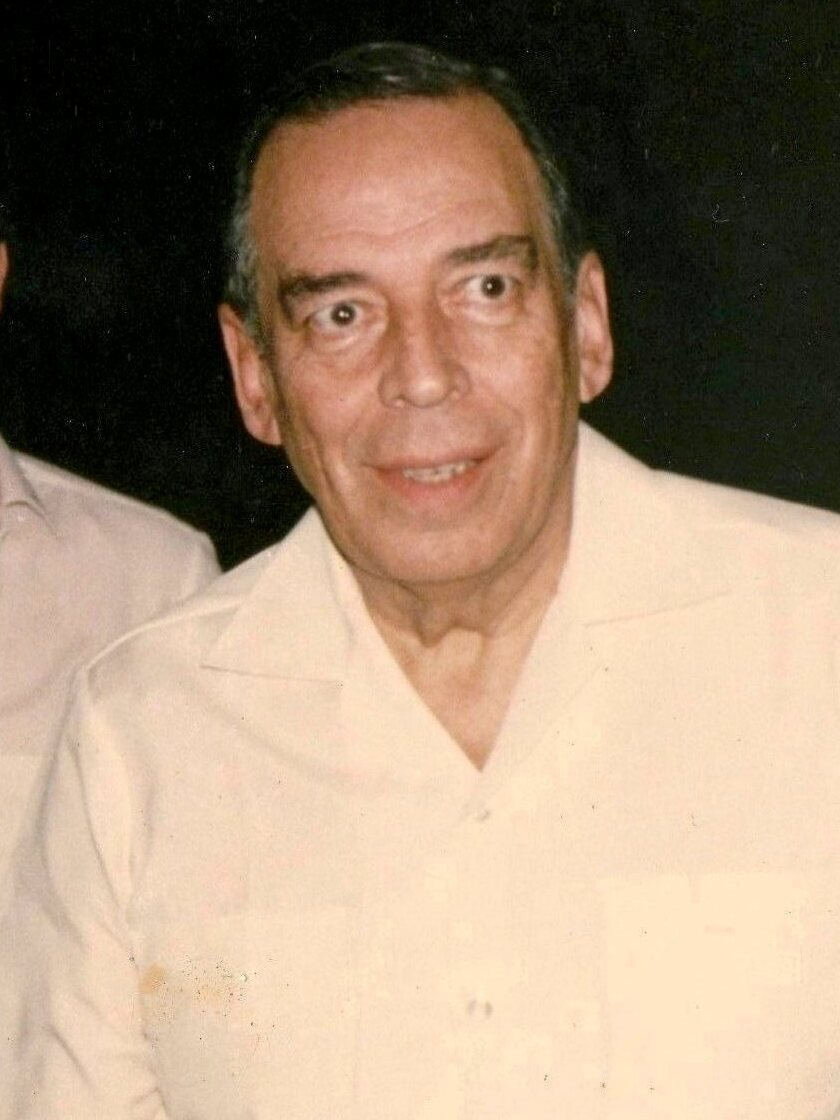
| Nominee | Alfonso López Michelsen | Álvaro Gómez Hurtado |
| Party | Liberal | Conservative |
| Home state | Bogotá | Bogotá |
| Popular vote | 2,929,719 | 1,634,879 |
| Percentage | 56.35% | 31.44% |
- Results by department
President before election
Misael Pastrana Borrero
Conservative
Elected President
Alfonso López Michelsen
Liberal

General elections were held in Colombia on 21 April 1974 to elect the President, Senate and Chamber of Representatives. They were the first elections after the end of the National Front agreement, which had restricted electoral participation to the Conservative Party and the Liberal Party, with each party allocated 50% of the seats in both houses, whilst the presidency alternated between the two parties.

Although the elections saw both parties field presidential candidates for the first time in over thirty years, voter turnout was only 45%. In the presidential elections, all three main candidates were the son or daughter of previous presidents. Alfonso López Michelsen of the Liberal Party won a landslide victory with 56% of the vote. The Liberal Party also won a majority of seats in both houses of Congress.

This was the first Colombian election where campaigning on television played a major role. Some have attributed Michelsen's victory to his effectiveness on television.

== Background ==
The National Front era began in 1958 when Liberal leader Alberto Lleras Camargo and Conservative leader Laureano Gomez wrote the Benidorm Pact, which led to a 16-year era in which the Liberal and Conservatives would alternate holding the presidency every four years. The Front was the result of a series of agreements between Camargo and Gomez, including the March Pact and the Sitges Pact, and was aimed at reducing inter-party strife was a response to La Violencia, a civil war between forces of the two parties between 1948 and 1958.

While the National Front reduced violence and helped raise GDP, it resulted in bipartisan stalemate. The Liberal and Conservative parties held almost equal power in both houses of Congress and were unable to pass reforms with a two-thirds majority as securing bipartisan support for policies was nearly impossible. This inability to reform created intra-party factionalism that manifested in the creation of party-affiliated social movements. The rise of dissident groups opposing the National Front challenged the establishment, and many would eventually become official parties prior to the 1974 elections.

Liberal dissenters formed the Liberal Recovery Movement under Alfonso Lopez Michelsen in 1959. In 1961, the populist National Popular Alliance was formed by Gustavo Rojas Pinilla after his return from exile. As these movements gained power, by 1974 the original Liberal and Conservative parties had become weak and internally fractioned, but no longer strongly opposed one another. Migration from rural to urban areas had also weakened party identification and loyalty.

== Electoral system ==
The president was elected by first-past-the-post voting in a single round. Members of the Senate and Chamber of Representatives were elected by closed list proportional representation. The voting age was 21 and voting was non-compulsory.

The number of seats in both houses of Congress was reduced as seats created to make an even number in each constituency during the National Front period were abolished.

== Presidential candidates ==
- Alfonso López Michelsen, Liberal Party: Son of former president Alfonso López Pumarejo, he ran on the slogan "A Clear Mandate." The PLC advocated for a closing of the gap between the rural and the urban populations, for an improvement of the socioeconomic status of the lower class (more than 50%) and for change in the status-quo. He ran as a social democrat.
- Álvaro Gómez Hurtado, Conservative Party: Son of former president Laureano Gómez. His political career began as a councillor in Bogotá, before becoming a member of the Chamber of Representatives and Senate, as well as serving as Plenipotentiary Minister. The 1974 elections were the first of three unsuccessful runs for president.
- María Eugenia Rojas Correa, National Popular Alliance: The daughter of former president Gustavo Rojas Pinilla. She helped form ANAPO in 1961 and served in the Chamber of Representatives and Senate, before becoming the first woman in Latin America to be a serious contender for president. She ran on a radical distributionist program. ANAPO advocated for the defense of Colombian sovereignty; the incorporation of socialism into the country; and an affirmation that humans must constitute the primordial concern of the state. Maria ran on the slogan "Socialism, Colombian Style", promising universal healthcare and free education at all levels.
- Hernando Echeverri Meija, National Opposition Union: His electoral platform advocated for anti-imperialism, revolutionary agrarian reform, unionized workers, and democratic freedoms.
- Hermes Duarte Arias, Christian Democratic Party
- José Córdoba, Independent

== Results ==
=== President ===
| Candidate | Party | Votes | % |
|---|---|---|---|
| Alfonso López Michelsen | Colombian Liberal Party | 2,929,719 | 56.35 |
| Álvaro Gómez Hurtado | Colombian Conservative Party | 1,634,879 | 31.44 |
| María Eugenia Rojas Correa | National Popular Alliance | 492,166 | 9.47 |
| Hernando Echeverri Meija | National Opposition Union | 137,054 | 2.64 |
| Hermes Duarte Arias | Christian Democratic Party | 5,718 | 0.11 |
| José Córdoba | Independent | 6 | 0.00 |
| Total | | 5,199,542 | 100.00 |
| Valid votes | | 5,199,542 | 99.76 |
| Invalid/blank votes | | 12,591 | 0.24 |
| Total votes | | 5,212,133 | 100.00 |
| Registered voters/turnout | | 8,964,472 | 58.14 |
Source: Nohlen

=== Senate ===
| Party | Votes | % | Seats | +/– |
|---|---|---|---|---|
| Colombian Liberal Party | 2,840,315 | 55.75 | 66 | +7 |
| Colombian Conservative Party | 1,631,115 | 32.02 | 37 | –22 |
| National Popular Alliance | 458,745 | 9.00 | 7 | – |
| National Opposition Union | 155,158 | 3.05 | 2 | New |
| Christian Democratic Party | 7,909 | 0.16 | 0 | New |
| Others | 1,310 | 0.03 | 0 | – |
| Total | 5,094,552 | 100.00 | 112 | –6 |
| Valid votes | 5,094,552 | 99.76 | | |
| Invalid/blank votes | 12,223 | 0.24 | | |
| Total votes | 5,106,775 | 100.00 | | |
| Registered voters/turnout | 8,925,330 | 57.22 | | |
Source: Nohlen

=== Chamber of Representatives ===
| Party | Votes | % | Seats | +/– |
|---|---|---|---|---|
| Colombian Liberal Party | 2,835,245 | 55.71 | 113 | +8 |
| Colombian Conservative Party | 1,631,926 | 32.07 | 66 | –39 |
| National Popular Alliance | 458,424 | 9.01 | 15 | – |
| National Opposition Union | 155,855 | 3.06 | 5 | New |
| Christian Democratic Party | 5,674 | 0.11 | 0 | New |
| Others | 1,764 | 0.03 | 0 | – |
| Total | 5,088,888 | 100.00 | 199 | –11 |
| Valid votes | 5,088,888 | 99.78 | | |
| Invalid/blank votes | 11,211 | 0.22 | | |
| Total votes | 5,100,099 | 100.00 | | |
| Registered voters/turnout | 8,925,330 | 57.14 | | |
Source: Nohlen
