= 1962 Colombian presidential election =

Presidential elections were held in Colombia on 6 May 1962. Under the National Front agreement, it was the turn of the Conservative Party to govern. The result was a victory for Guillermo León Valencia.

Despite the National Front agreement, Alfonso López Michelsen of the Liberal Party also contested the election. However, the Electoral Court labelled any votes for him as invalid. Votes for Gustavo Rojas Pinilla of the National Popular Alliance were also declared invalid due to Rojas' leadership of the 1953 military coup. As a result, Valencia was declared to have won with 84% of the vote.

== Results ==
Results by Province and Municipality

| Candidate | Party | Votes | % |
|---|---|---|---|
| Guillermo León Valencia | Colombian Conservative Party | 1,636,081 | 84.09 |
| Alfonso López Michelsen | Colombian Liberal Party | 625,630 | – |
| Jorge Leyva Urdaneta | Colombian Conservative Party | 308,992 | 15.88 |
| Gustavo Rojas Pinilla | National Popular Alliance | 54,562 | – |
| Others | | 509 | 0.03 |
| Total | | 1,945,582 | 100.00 |
| Valid votes | | 1,945,582 | 73.84 |
| Invalid/blank votes | | 689,258 | 26.16 |
| Total votes | | 2,634,840 | 100.00 |
| Registered voters/turnout | | 5,404,765 | 48.75 |
Source: Nohlen
