= Alfonso Uribe Misas =

Colombian lawyer, politician and writer

- Born: 26 December 1896; Medellín, Colombia
- Died: 2 July 1984 (aged 87); Medellín, Colombia
- Education: National University of Colombia
- Occupations: Lawyer, politician, writer
- Spouse: Joaquina Melguizo Santa Maria
- Children: 3
- Writing career
- Language: Spanish
- Genre: Law
- Notable works: The Single School; If the Concordat was violated? Between two poles Catholic missions before Colombian law and public international law Freedom of education in Colombia

Senate of Colombia
- In office 20 July 1942 – 20 July 1946

President, Senate of Colombia
- In office 20 July 1942 – 20 July 1946

Alfonso Uribe Misas (26 December 1896 – 2 July 1984) was a Colombian lawyer, politician and writer.

== Life and career ==
Alfonso Uribe Misas was born on 26 December 1896 in Medellín. He was the son of José María Uribe Gaviria and Esther Misas Barrientos. He graduated as a lawyer at the National University of Colombia, Bogotá.

Being a Circuit Judge in 1920, when confirming a sentence in the case of a civil marriage, made in accordance with current law, he was excommunicated by the Catholic Church together with Judge José J. Gómez who celebrated the marriage. After a long process before the Court of the Roman Rota, it issues a ruling in favor of both judges, which created controversy in the political and religious circles of the country.

He married Joaquina Melguizo Santa María in 1926.

In 1929 he was elected deputy of the Departmental Assembly of Antioquia.

He acted as a lawyer of several companies, and was a principal member of the board of Municipal Public Companies. On 9 July 1929, he became the rector of the School of Law of the University of Antioquia.

Immediately after the aerial accident of 24 June 1935 at the "Las Playas" aerodrome (Olaya Herrera Airport) in Medellín, he was appointed as the legal representative of SCADTA. He was in charge of the process until its favorable completion for this company on 25 May 1938.

In July 1938 he was appointed as the main representative of the House of Representatives, by the Department of Antioquia.

In 1941 he published the work that summarizes the articles he wrote under the heading of "The Single School", on unification and regime of the primary school, project presented before the Congress, by the then Minister of National Education, Dr. Jorge Eliécer Gaitán.

In 1942, together with Laureano Gomez, he developed the national debate on the reform of the Concordat with the Holy See. He was appointed as the sole spokesman for the Colombian Conservative Party before parliament.

He held the Presidency of the Senate of the Republic, and the Presidency of the National Conservative Directory; under his direction, were the doctors Guillermo León Valencia, Francisco de Paula Pérez Tamayo, Gonzalo Restrepo Jaramillo, José Antonio Montalvo, Jesús Estrada Monsalve, Silvio Villegas, Fernando Londoño and Londoño, and others.

In 1945, he published a study in conjunction with Liborio Escallon, which is entitled: If the Concordat was violated?.

In recognition of the contribution he made to the campaign for the election of Mariano Ospina Pérez to the Presidency of Colombia, he was named ambassador to the Quirinal in Rome, Italy in 1948.

After three years in the diplomatic service, he returned and settled in Medellín.

On 23 May 1951, he was appointed member of the board of directors of the Society of Public Improvements of Medellín, and later president of the same.

In 1953, he was appointed Grand Rector of the University of Antioquia, by the then President of the Republic, General Gustavo Rojas Pinilla.

In 1954, he published the book "Between two poles", published by the printing press of the University of Antioquia, an essay on the Constitutional Reform.

In 1962, he published the book "Freedom of education in Colombia"

In 1963, he published his work "Catholic missions before Colombian law and public international law"

He later held the position of senator for the Department of Antioquia.

He died in Medellín, on 30 February 1984.
