= Samuel Moreno Rojas =

Colombian politician (1960–2023)

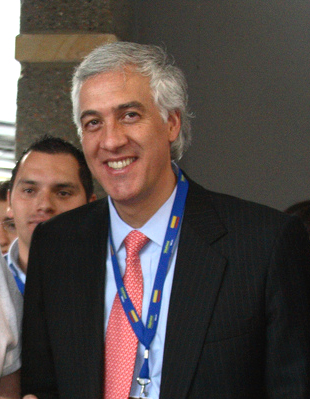

796th Mayor of Bogotá
- In office 1 January 2008 – 3 May 2011
- Preceded by: Luis Eduardo Garzón
- Succeeded by: Gustavo Petro

Senator of Colombia
- In office 7 July 1991 – 7 July 2006

Personal details
- Born: Samuel Gustavo Moreno Rojas; 11 February 1960 Miami, Florida, U.S.
- Died: 10 February 2023 (aged 62) Bogotá, D.C., Colombia
- Party: Alternative Democratic Pole
- Other political affiliations: Independent Democratic Pole; National Popular Alliance
- Spouse: Cristina González (m. 1998)
- Relations: Gustavo Rojas Pinilla (grandfather); Carolina Correa Londoño (grandmother)
- Children: 2
- Parent: María Eugenia Rojas Correa (mother)
- Education: Our Lady of the Rosary University
- Profession: Lawyer
- Website: www.samuelalcalde.com

Samuel Gustavo Moreno Rojas (11 February 1960 – 10 February 2023) was a Colombian lawyer and politician, son of former congressman Samuel Moreno Díaz and former presidential candidate María Eugenia Rojas Correa, grandson of former Colombian political-military authoritarian leader and ex-president Gustavo Rojas Pinilla. His brother Iván Moreno Rojas is a former Mayor of Bucaramanga, minister and senator. On 28 October 2007, Moreno Rojas was elected Mayor of Bogotá representing the Alternative Democratic Pole (PDA) for the 2008–2012 term. On 3 May 2011, Moreno was suspended and stripped of his office by the Office of the Inspector General for improprieties in the appropriation of city contracts. For the same accusations, the Office of the Attorney General of Colombia argued for a pretrial detention, and Moreno was arrested on 23 September 2011. He was sentenced in 2016 to 18 years of prison for his direct involvement in a corruption scheme during his term.

== Education ==
Moreno Rojas studied Economics and Law in the Universidad del Rosario in Bogotá and obtained specializations in business administration from the University of the Andes, Pontificia Universidad Javeriana and Harvard University.

== Career ==
In 1982 Moreno Rojas joined the political party founded by his grandfather Gustavo Rojas Pinilla and then led by his mother, the National Popular Alliance (ANAPO). He became the coordinator of the ANAPO youth movement from 1982 to 1985. In 1985, he then became coordinator for Bogotá until 1987 when he was appointed the national coordinator, a post in which he served until 2003.

=== Public office career ===
Moreno Rojas was elected senator of Colombia in 1991 and then reelected for three more periods; 1994, 1998 and 2002. After 2002 Moreno Rojas focused on consolidating the Independent Democratic Pole, a leftist political movement that included ANAPO and of which he was made party president. In 2005 Moreno Rojas was defeated by Antonio Navarro Wolff during the Democratic Pole's convention to appoint a presidential candidate. He then decided not to run for a fifth term as senator in order to seek the Mayorship of Bogotá for 2008.

=== Candidacy ===
On 8 July 2007, he was elected as the candidate for the Alternative Democratic Pole after defeating the frontrunner in the opinion polls, María Emma Mejía.

=== Controversy during candidacy ===
On 21 October, in a live TV debate, he was asked by Antanas Mockus if he would pay for 50 votes if that prevented someone who had already paid for 50,000 votes from winning, thus "saving Bogotá". His response was "Yes, without doubt!". His answer was controversial and highly criticized. Later, he claimed that he had not understood the question and that the expression "saving Bogotá" had led him to give such an answer.

During his campaign he proposed the construction of an underground rapid transit system to increase the city's public transport capacity and reduce commuting time and crowding. This proposition was controversial, because the city already had a mass transit system, the TransMilenio which is not finished yet, and the construction of this new system will make impossible to finish it, there's also the possibility that the city can't afford the construction and maintenance of the railway. President Álvaro Uribe mentioned that he would support the new system after proper analysis of the proposal and viability, and suggested that the system must be financially self-sustainable if built. Uribe alleged that the Colombian government was unable to sustain through subsidies the maintenance of the rapid transit system.

=== Elected mayor ===
Moreno defeated rival and former Mayor Enrique Peñalosa in Bogotá's mayoral elections in October 2007, with 43.7% of the votes against the 28.15% achieved by Peñalosa. He took office on 1 January 2008.

During his period in charge of the city, Moreno was widely criticised by media, members of his political party and a large proportion of his electors, due to his lack of results in terms of urban security, transit, and political promises made during his campaign.

=== 2011 Suspension and Detention ===
On 3 May 2011, the Inspector General of Colombia, Alejandro Ordoñez decided to suspend Moreno for three months, due to alleged omissions on public works executions. This case has a link with an ongoing investigation for corruption and irregularities related to public construction bidding in Bogotá. On 2 August 2011, the Inspector decided to extend the suspension for three more months, claiming that the case against Moreno has not been resolved yet, and more time is required to achieve a resolution. On 23 September 2011, he was put in pretrial detention by a judge while his legal status is defined.

== Personal life and death ==
Moreno Rojas died from cardiac arrest on 10 February 2023 at age 62, one day before his 63rd birthday.
