= 1968 Colombian parliamentary election =

Parliamentary elections were held in Colombia on 17 March 1968 to elect the Chamber of Representatives, the last occasion on which mid-term elections were held for the Chamber. Under the National Front agreement, only the Conservative Party and the Liberal Party were able to contest the elections, with 50% of the seats in both houses allocated to each party. As a result, the main contest at the elections was between factions within each party.

== Results ==
Party and faction		Votes	%	Seats	+/–
Colombian; Liberal; Party	Oficialistas	988,540	39.72	77	+8
Colombian; Liberal; Party	Oficialistas disidentes	196,457	7.89	17	New
Colombian; Liberal; Party	National Popular Alliance	82,294	3.31	6	+2
Colombian; Liberal; Party	People's Liberal Revolutionary Movement	55,984	2.25	2	New
Colombian; Liberal; Party	Others	5,351	0.21	0	–
Colombian; Liberal; Party	Total	1,328,626	53.38	102	+7
Colombian; Conservative; Party	Unionistas	578,485	23.24	49	+14
Colombian; Conservative; Party	National Popular Alliance	319,609	12.84	28	–5
Colombian; Conservative; Party	Lauro-Alzatistas	48,087	1.93	5	–20
Colombian; Conservative; Party	Others	14,937	0.60	1	+1
Colombian; Conservative; Party	Independents	199,330	8.01	19	+18
Colombian; Conservative; Party	Total	1,160,448	46.62	102	+7
Total		2,489,074	100.00	204	+14
Valid votes		2,489,074	99.70		
Invalid/blank votes		7,381	0.30		
Total votes		2,496,455	100.00		
Registered voters/turnout		6,696,723	37.28		
Source: Nohlen
