= 1953 Colombian coup d'état =

- Part of La Violencia
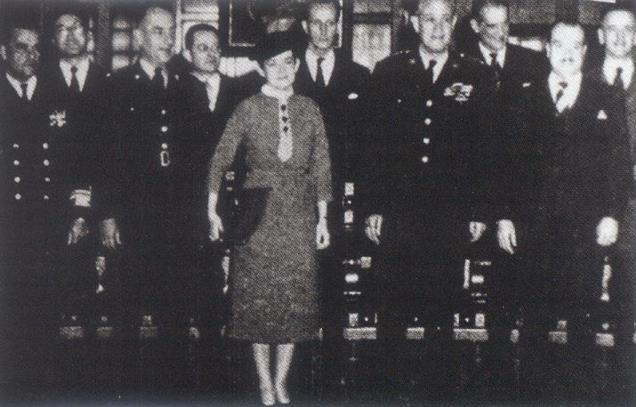
- Rojas Pinilla's military cabinet
Date	June 13, 1953
Location	Colombia
Status	Laureano Gómez ousted from office

Belligerents
(Colombia) Colombian government (Gómez faction	(Colombia) Colombian government (Pinilla faction)

Commanders and leaders
(Colombia) Laureano Gómez (POW)	(Colombia) Gustavo Rojas Pinilla

The 1953 Colombian coup d'état was the bloodless coup followed by seizing of power from Conservative President Laureano Gómez, by Colombia's commander in chief Gustavo Rojas Pinilla on June 13, 1953. Colombia was ruled by Rojas Pinilla's military dictatorship until the Colombian coup of May 10, 1957, when he was forced to step down and hand over power to a military junta.

The coup had the support of former Presidents Mariano Ospina Pérez and Roberto Urdaneta Arbeláez, as well as the National Police and Military Forces (armed forces of Colombia).
