= Colombian coup d'état =

The Colombian coup d'état can refer to:

- 1900 Colombian coup d'état
- 1953 Colombian coup d'état
- 1957 Colombian coup d'état
