= María Eugenia Rojas =

María Eugenia Rojas may refer to:

- María Eugenia Rojas Correa (born 1932), Colombian political figure
- María Eugenia Rojas (tennis) (born 1977), Peruvian tennis player
