= Gabriel París Gordillo =

Colombian military and political official

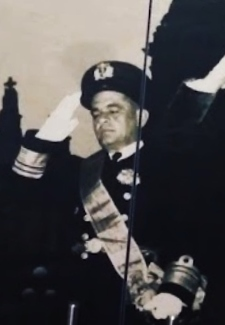

President of Colombia
- De Facto
- In office May 10, 1957 – August 7, 1958
- Appointed by: Military junta
- Preceded by: Gustavo Rojas Pinilla
- Succeeded by: Alberto Lleras Camargo

Presidential Designate
- In office July 30, 1955 – August 20, 1958
- President: Gustavo Rojas Pinilla
- Preceded by: Roberto Urdaneta
- Succeeded by: Darío Echandía

Minister of War
- In office August 7, 1954 – May 10, 1957
- President: Gustavo Rojas Pinilla
- Preceded by: Gustavo Berrío Muñoz
- Succeeded by: Alfonso Saiz Montoya

Minister of Justice
- In office February 9, 1954 – August 7, 1954
- President: Gustavo Rojas Pinilla
- Preceded by: Antonio Escobar Camargo
- Succeeded by: Luis Caro Escallón

Personal details
- Born: Gabriel París Gordillo; March 8, 1910 Ibagué, Tolima, Colombia
- Died: March 21, 2008 (aged 98) Girardot, Cundinamarca, Colombia
- Resting place: Central Cemetery of Bogotá
- Spouse: María Felisa Quevedo (m. 1911; died 1994)
- Children: Gabriel París Quevedo, Jaime París Quevedo, Gloria París Quevedo and Carolina París Quevedo
- Education: Escuela Militar de Cadetes 'José María Córdova', Command and General Staff College
- Occupation: Soldier (General), politician
- Awards: Order of Boyacá Order of José Acevedo y Gómez

Military service
- Allegiance: Colombia
- Branch/service: Army
- Years of service: 1928–1958
- Rank: General
- Battles/wars: Colombia-Peru War

Gabriel París Gordillo (March 8, 1910 – March 21, 2008) was a Colombian military officer and political leader who ruled the country as the chairman of a military junta from May 1957 to August 1958, following the resignation of General Gustavo Rojas Pinilla. París oversaw the regime's transition to electoral democracy after four years of military dictatorship, and turned over power to Alberto Lleras Camargo of the National Front.

== Biographic data ==
General Gabriel París was born in Ibagué, Tolima, on March 8, 1910.

== Early years ==
Gabriel París studied at the Colegio San Simón in Ibagué, Department of Tolima. After graduating París enlisted in the Colombian Army studying at the Gr. José María Córdova Academy in 1928 and becoming a lieutenant for the cavalry later on December 11, 1929, assigned to Grupo No. 1 Páez, unit in which he spent most of his career.

== War with Peru ==
As a lieutenant, París participated in the Colombia-Peru War in 1933 at the línea Baraya-La Tagua war front. For being an excellent officer París was assigned a horse trainer at the ‘Gr. José María Córdova' Academy.

== Promotions as officer ==
Gabriel París was promoted to major in 1941 at the Colombia Superior School of War. In 1941 was later promoted to lieutenant colonel and was sent to study in Fort Leavenworth, United States. He was later assigned trainer at the Colombian Superior School of War and Chief of the Mounted and Veterinary. In 1949 was assigned commander of the Grupo N° 2 Rondón unit and in 1950, chief of the Second Brigade, based in Barranquilla. He was later assigned commander of the Fourth Brigade, based in Medellín.

== Under Rojas Pinillas rule ==
During the government of President Gustavo Rojas Pinilla, París was appointed to many public office posts.

=== General of the Army ===
París was promoted to brigadier general on February 28, 1953, and assigned commander of the Colombian Army. On June 27 of this same year París was appointed alternative representative of Colombia in the disarmament commission of the UN Security Council acting as ambassador of Colombia to the United Nations.

=== Ministries ===
París was appointed minister of justice on February 9, 1954, and later on August 7 appointed as minister of war. He also managed the Ministry of Foreign Affairs temporarily. París occupied the presidency of Colombia temporarily while General Rojas Pinilla visited Ecuador between July 30 and August 2, 1955. On February 29, 1956, París was promoted to the rank of major general.

== Military junta ==
Civil unrest, political upheaval and public discontent had turned the country into chaos. Angry and violent street demonstrations and a general strike on May 10, 1957, brought down the government of General Gustavo Rojas Pinilla. At the age of 47 years, General París was selected by General Gustavo Rojas Pinilla to precede the military junta set to replace himself. General París assumed the presidency on May 10, 1957, along with two other Generals of the Army, Luis E. Ordóñez Castillo and Rafael Navas Pardo, a general from the National Police Deogracias Fonseca Espinosa and rear admiral of the Colombian National Armada Rubén Piedrahíta Arango. General París was elected as chairman of the junta, and as such, became “Presidente de la República”.

The other four members of the Junta received the same title. The first decrees of the junta were to restore peace and order, freedom of speech and association, freedom of the press, adherence to the Constitution and calling for a presidential election as soon as possible. In order to ease tensions, the junta also appointed as ministers of the presidential cabinet highly reputed members of both political parties. Besides restoring peace and order, the junta’s main concern was the economy. The nation had a huge fiscal deficit, the trade deficit was exorbitant and the national debt had surpassed $500 million, resulting in high unemployment and an economic recession, which was turning into a depression.

In order to address the financial crisis, the junta created an economic and financial task force, presided by Alfonso López Pumarejo and Mariano Ospina Pérez. Both leaders were commissioned and sent to the United States of America as a national mission to secure an emergency loan of $103 million to stimulate the economy, pay some foreign debt and invigorate the employment scenario. This mission was also to discuss and negotiate a price agreement for coffee, as the export of this commodity was essential to the trade balance of Colombia. The commission also promoted the advancement of technical educational and created the "Servicio Nacional de Aprendizaje" (SENA).

Regarding international trade and commerce, the administration of General París and the Junta implemented the "Plan Vallejo" which was designed to promote and stimulate exports and to reduce unnecessary imports. The Junta also encouraged foreign private investment and eased monetary operations and exchange rates. General París and the junta initiated international negotiations with major world producing countries to establish what would be known as the “Pacto Mundial” (world accord). On the political front, to honor the agreements of the "Treaty of Sitges”, the junta would call a general election.

The treaty, signed by former presidents Laureano Gómez and Alberto Lleras Camargo in June 1957, prescribed for the junta to hold a general election on December 1, of that same year, as a national plebiscite to legitimize the National Front.

== End of military junta ==
On May 4, 1958, popular elections took place to replace the Military Junta and transition once again into a democracy. Alberto Lleras resulted elected as the first president of the National Front. General París retired from active service and inaugurated Lleras as president of Colombia on August 7, 1958. París Gordillo dedicated to his private life affairs.

== Recognitions ==
In 1996 París was decorated by the Municipal Council of Bogotá in the 150th anniversary of the installation of the Simón Bolívar statue at the Plaza Mayor. The statue was donated by París's great-grandfather don José Ignacio París Ricaurte. In 2000 was honorary promoted to three suns general by then president of Colombia, Andrés Pastrana. In 2002 París attended the inauguration of Álvaro Uribe as president of Colombia.

== Personal life ==
On 28 September 1936, Gabriel París married María Felisa Quevedo París (his cousin) (11 May 1911 – 17 June 1994), and had four children: Gabriel, Jaime, Gloria and Ligia Carolina París Quevedo. He lived his last days at a ranch named ‘El Recreo' in a vereda named El Topacio in Flandes. At the age of 98 years was the last survivor of the military junta and the eldest former president of Colombia.

Government offices
Preceded by Gustavo Rojas Pinilla	President of Colombia (Colombian Military Junta); 1957–1958	Succeeded by Alberto Lleras Camargo
