= El Nuevo Siglo =

Colombian newspaper

- Front page of El Nuevo Siglo, 15 April 2011
- Type: Daily newspaper
- Format: Tabloid
- Founder(s): Laureano Gómez Castro, José de la Vega
- Publisher: Editorial la Unidad S.A.
- Editor-in-chief: Alberto Abello Moreno
- Managing editor: Jaime Eduardo Hoyos Gutiérrez
- Founded: 1925
- Ceased publication: 1953
- Relaunched: 1957
- Political alignment: Centre-right
- Language: Spanish
- Headquarters: Calle 25D # 101B-04; Bogotá, D.C., Colombia
- ISSN: 0122-2341
- OCLC number: 43562591
- Website: www.elnuevosiglo.com.co

El Nuevo Siglo (English: The New Century) is a regional daily newspaper based in Bogotá, Colombia.

== History and profile ==
It was founded in 1925 with the name El Siglo by Laureano Gómez Castro and José de la Vega, but its staunch opposition to the military rule of General Gustavo Rojas Pinilla led it to be closed by the Government in 1953, and only reopened at the end of the dictatorship in 1957. The newspaper had a drastic change of presentation in 1990, when it went from a broadsheet format to tabloid, and changed its name to the current one.
