= Carolina Correa Londoño =

First Lady of Colombia from 1953 to 1957

Carolina Correa de Rojas

First Lady of Colombia
- In role 13 June 1953 – 10 May 1957
- President: Gustavo Rojas Pinilla
- Preceded by: Clemencia Holguín de Urdaneta
- Succeeded by: Bertha Puga de Lleras

Personal details
- Born: Carolina Correa Londoño; 25 January 1905 Támesis, Antioquia, Colombia
- Died: 15 July 1986 (aged 81) Bogotá, D.C., Colombia
- Party: National Popular Alliance
- Spouse: Gustavo Rojas Pinilla (m. 1930; died 1975)
- Children: Gustavo Emilio Rojas Correa; María Eugenia Rojas Correa; Carlos Rojas Correa

Carolina "Carola" Correa de Rojas Pinilla (née Correa; 25 January 1905 – 15 July 1986) was the first lady of Colombia from 1953 to 1957 as the wife of President Gustavo Rojas Pinilla. Born in Medellín, Antioquia, she grew up in a wealthy family in Támesis, Antioquia. She married Rojas Pinilla, then a lieutenant in the National Army of Colombia, in 1930. Carolina lived in various cities in Colombia due to her husband's military career.

As First Lady, Rojas had a great influence on her husband's social policies, supporting women's civil rights. She was the first woman to hold a national identity card. The Rojas Pinilla family were married for 45 years, until Gustavo's death in 1975. He spent most of his retirement and widowhood in Bogotá.

== Early life ==
Carolina Correa Londoño was born on January 22, 1905, in Medellín, Antioquia, to businessman Emilio Correa Correa and Emilia Londoño Jaramillo. She grew up in Támesis, Antioquia. Her family's wealth provided them with many comforts, including servants who attended to their needs. Although not considered rich, the Londoños lived comfortably.

Carola, as she was affectionately known by her family, became interested in Lieutenant Gustavo Rojas Pinilla in mid-1929. He courted her for the following month before they began dating exclusively. They married in Medellín on May 10, 1930.

During the following years, Correa de Rojas lived as a military wife, moving frequently due to her husband's various postings. Throughout Gustavo's 37 years of military service, they lived in 12 different homes some of his postings included the United States and Germany. Bogotá was the place where they spent the most time and where they later settled. The Rojas Pinilla family had three children: Gustavo Emilio, María Eugenia, and Carlos. Both were born in Bogotá. After Gustavo became Chief of the General Staff of the Military Forces in 1950, the Rojas Pinilla family settled permanently in Bogotá, D.C.

Honorary titles
Preceded by Clemencia Holguín de Urdaneta	First Lady of Colombia; 1953–1957	Succeeded by Bertha Puga de Lleras
