= Gerardo Molina =

Colombian politician (1906–1991)

Gerardo Molina Ramírez

Senator of Colombia
- In office 1962–1964
- Preceded by: Abel Botero Arango
- Constituency: Antioquia Department

Member of the Chamber of Representatives of Colombia
- In office 1939–1941
- In office 1933–1935
- In office 1935–1939
- Preceded by: Baldomero Sanín Cano
- Constituency: Antioquia Department

Personal details
- Born: August 6, 1906 Gómez Plata, Antioquia, Colombia
- Died: March 29, 1991 (aged 84) Bogotá, D.C., Colombia
- Spouses: María Eastman (m. 1934–1947) Blanca Ochoa (m. 1953–1991)
- Children: Juan Patricio Molina Ochoa; Carlos Gerardo Molina Ochoa
- Education: National University of Colombia
- Profession: Lawyer

Gerardo Molina Ramírez (August 6, 1906 – March 29, 1991) was a Colombian Congressman who served in both chambers, a lawyer and professor who was dean of the National University of Colombia and of the Free University of Colombia. Molina finished fourth in the 1982 Colombian presidential election and received 82,858 votes. He belonged to Unidad Democrática de la Izquierda.
