= 1957 Colombian coup d'état =

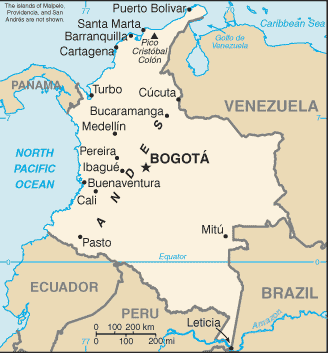
Date	May 10, 1957
Location	Colombia
Result	Coup attempt successful: Overthrow of the Rojas dictatorship; Formation of transitional military junta; Restoration of civilian rule in 1958

Belligerents
Military Forces of Colombia	(Colombia) Dissenting faction of the armed forces

Commanders and leaders
(Colombia) Gustavo Rojas Pinilla	(Colombia) Gabriel París (Colombia) Deogracias Fonseca (Colombia) Ruben Piedrahita (Colombia) Rafael Navas Pardo (Colombia) Luis Ordonez

Casualties and losses
- 100 dead

The 1957 Colombian coup d'état was the nonviolent overthrow in Colombia of the Gustavo Rojas Pinilla dictatorship by the military, resulting in the establishment of a five-man junta that restored civilian rule a year later in 1958. The coup attempt followed a period of civil unrest as Rojas, coming to power in 1953 promising to end the La Violencia and initially hailed as Colombia's savior, caused political discontent with his authoritarian policies, including silencing of the free press, detainment of opposition groups, and suspension of the country's constitution.

In the lead-up to the coup, the leader of the opposition Guillermo Leon Valencia was placed under house arrest on May 1, causing widespread civil disobedience. Dubbed the "Jornadas de Mayo," the 10-day period was marked by nationwide student protests and the impromptu shutdown of universities, newspapers, shops, factories, businesses, and banks. The ensuing student demonstrations resulted in one hundred dead, with tear gas and jets of red-colored-water being used on the demonstrators. In response, an Archbishop in Cali threatened to excommunicate those responsible for the killings.

Recognizing the growing unrest, several military leaders held a meeting and agreed on the need to depose Rojas. In the early hours of the morning on May 10, Rojas was pressured to step down, a junta taking his place soon after. He then departed with his family for Spain.

The five-man military junta, composed of those who had previously served under the Rojas regime, - Gabriel París, Deogracias Fonseca, Ruben Piedrahita, Rafael Navas Pardo, and Luis Ordonez - announced their intentions for the restoration of civilian rule by August 7, 1958, through elections and other measures. During this period of military rule, a largely civilian and bi-partisan cabinet was appointed with the approval of the major parties. The "Parity Commission on Institutional Readjustment" was also formed to study constitutional reform along with a two-man bi-partisan "National Commission on Criminal Investigation" to investigate corruption and malpractice.

== See also ==
- Colombian Military Junta
