= 1982 Colombian presidential election =

Colombian presidential election, 1982

- 30 May 1982
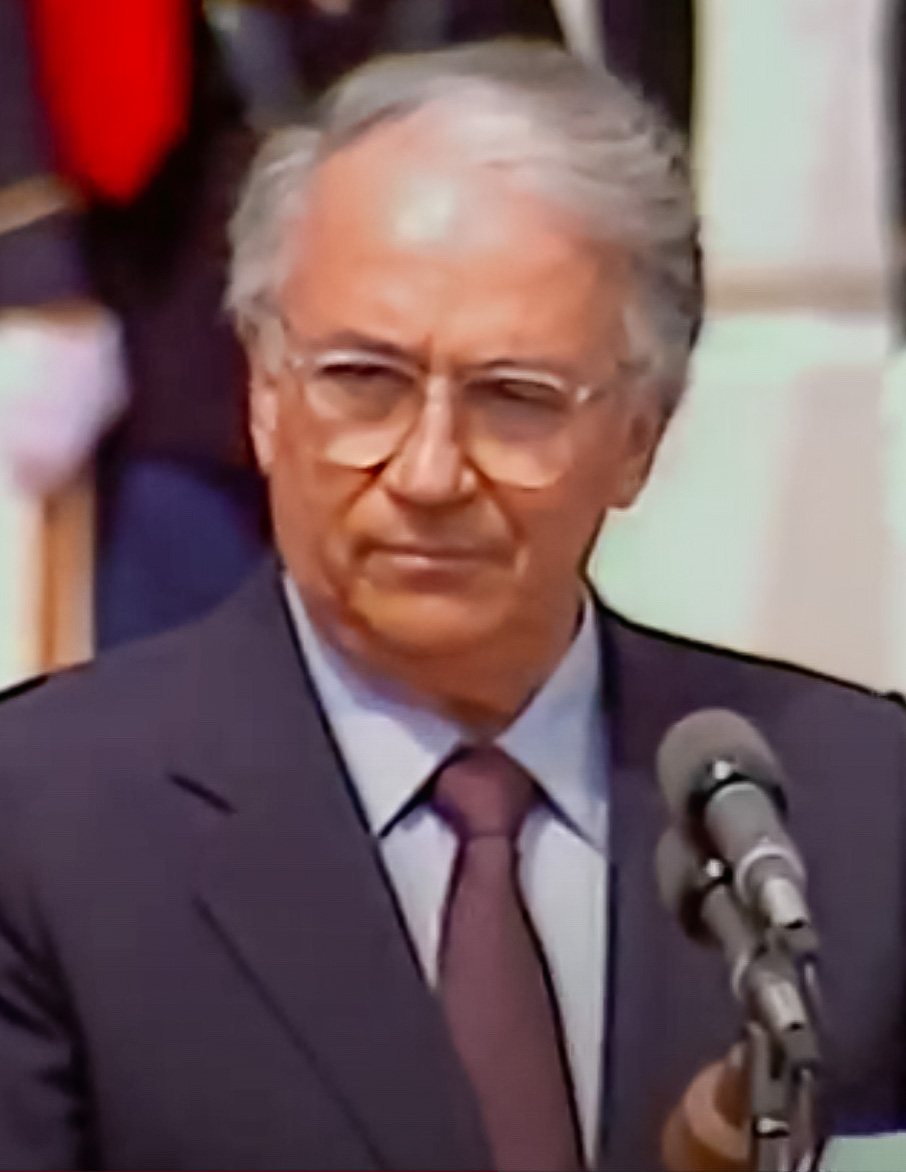

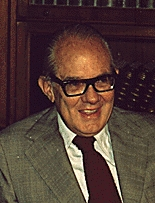
Nominee	Belisario Betancur	Alfonso López Michelsen
Party	Conservative	Liberal
Home state	Antioquia	Bogotá
Popular vote	3,189,278	2,797,627
Percentage	46.75%	41.01%
- Results by department
President before election
Julio César Turbay Ayala
Liberal
Elected President
Belisario Betancur
Conservative

Presidential elections were held in Colombia on 30 May 1982. The result was a victory for Belisario Betancur of the Conservative Party–National Movement, who received 46.8% of the vote.

== Results ==
Candidate	Party	Votes	%
Belisario Betancur	Colombian Conservative Party–National Movement	3,189,278	46.75
Alfonso López Michelsen	Colombian Liberal Party	2,797,627	41.01
Luis Carlos Galán	New Liberalism	745,738	10.93
Gerardo Molina	Democratic Front	82,858	1.21
Florentino Porras Pardo	Popular Claim	159	0.00
Write-ins		6,142	0.09
Total		6,821,802	100.00
Valid votes		6,821,802	99.73
Invalid/blank votes		18,590	0.27
Total votes		6,840,392	100.00
Registered voters/turnout		13,734,093	49.81
Source: Nohlen
