= Independent Democratic Pole =

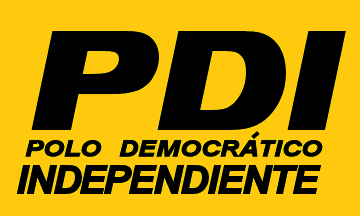
- Founded: July 17, 2003
- Dissolved: October 27, 2011
- Merger of: National Popular Alliance; 19th of April Movement
- Merged into: Alternative Democratic Pole
- Ideology: Social democracy Democratic socialism Progressivism; Keynesianism; Eco-socialism; Left-wing nationalism
- Political position: Left-wing
- Regional affiliation: COPPPAL
- International affiliation: Socialist International (Observer)

The Independent Democratic Pole (Polo Democrático Independiente) or (PDI), was a left-wing social democratic political party in Colombia.

== Origins ==
Originally formed as a left-wing congressional coalition, the party itself was officially founded on July 17, 2003. The congressional movement consisted of the union of diverse tendencies among the Colombian left (including former guerrillas, labor and union leaders, indigenous representatives and others), including many of, but not necessarily limited to, Marxist extraction.

Some of the members of the original group which did not formally join the new party remained as members of separate political structures, one of which then founded Democratic Alternative (AD).

== Political platform ==
The PDI's platform principally consisted of supporting a negotiated settlement with the country's leftwing insurgencies, defending the principles and practical applications of Colombia's 1991 Constitution, rejecting the country's traditionally bipartisan politics, and promoting democracy, freedom and social justice while also respecting human rights. The party completely rejected the armed struggle of the FARC and ELN as an effective means to solve Colombia's social, political and economical problems.

== Political development ==
Despite threats and violent actions from elements of the country's radical right-wing, most notably from AUC paramilitaries and others, which have resulted in the murder of some of its members, the PDI has become a nationally recognized movement and it has enjoyed some recent electoral successes, such as winning the October 2003 election for the office of Bogotá's mayor through their candidate Luis Eduardo Garzón, the governorship of the Valle del Cauca department through Angelino Garzón, and being partially responsible for the failure of the government's October 2003 referendum (which it opposed, together with the Colombian Liberal Party and others). The party also became part of a few ruling coalitions in other local municipalities, such as Nariño, Pasto.

The PDI was present as an observer in the Socialist International. The PDI was in political opposition to the government of president Álvaro Uribe, being critical of many of his actions and generally rejecting his policies as counter-productive or ineffective. This has not prevented several of its members from participating in discussions and finding points of agreement with some Uribe supporters or with other more traditional politicians.

Ahead of the 2006 elections, the PDI and Democratic Alternative formed an alliance called Alternative Democratic Pole (PDA). The PDA chose AD's Carlos Gaviria Díaz as its presidential candidate, defeating the PDI's Antonio Navarro Wolff in a close race.

== See also ==
- Politics of Colombia
- List of political parties in Colombia
