= National Front (Colombia) =

Colombian political coalition

National Front (Spanish: Frente Nacional; 1956–1974) was a period in the history of Colombia in which the two main political parties, the Liberal Party and the Conservative Party, agreed to rotate power, intercalating for a period of four presidential terms. The National Front Presidents were Alberto Lleras Camargo (Liberal), Guillermo León Valencia (Conservative), Carlos Lleras Restrepo (Liberal), and Misael Pastrana Borrero (Conservative).

== Prelude ==
The National Front consisted in intercalating presidential terms sharing the bureaucracy in equal parts from 1958 to 1974, four complete presidential terms of four years each, two of Liberal mandates and two of Conservative mandates. The idea surged after former president Rafael Reyes (1904–1909) which was known as the Concordia Nacional, a conservative government that allowed half of its cabinet to be shared with liberals. After President Reyes' departure a third political movement surged, known as the "Union Republicana".

Years later, in 1946 the "Union Nacional" was offered by the then Conservative presidential candidate Mariano Ospina Pérez and put in practice as he was elected president. Ospina shared ministries and provincial governors with the Liberal Party in equal halves. On February 29, 1948, the Liberal Party led by Jorge Eliecer Gaitan decided to leave "Union Nacional" and removed Liberal members from the government's cabinet. On March 21, 1948, President Ospina then appointed replacements all from his Conservative party.

=== El Bogotazo ===
With the assassination of Gaitan on April 9, 1948, tensions between the two parties escalated to physical confrontations. The followers of the popular Liberal leader started rioting against government forces and followers and vandalized the capital city Bogotá. Violence then spread to other regions of the country. Both parties then decided to reinstate the "Union Nacional", until the Liberal Party led by Carlos Lleras Restrepo retreated from the agreement in May 1949 to protest against Ospina's government and achieve the majority needed for congress in the elections of October 5, 1957.

Following Ospina's presidency, the conservative Laureano Gómez was elected president. His authoritarianism divided the Conservative party and prompted the Liberal Party to protest against him. Gómez was then toppled in a coup d'etat in which General Gustavo Rojas Pinilla assumed the control of the country.

=== Government of Rojas Pinilla ===
Most of the population celebrated the toppling of Gómez and initially supported the military dictatorship of Rojas Pinilla whose intention was to bring to an end the political violence generated by El Bogotazo and Jorge Eliecer Gaitan's assassination. Rojas Pinilla introduced an agrarian reform in an effort to solve the social disparities present in the countryside and appease armed peasants.

The government of Rojas Pinilla helped develop many areas of Colombia, mainly infrastructure and the creation of new government institutions; highways, airports, schools and universities. Rojas Pinilla introduced the television in Colombia and new technology represented in the improvement of telephone services. He also ordered the construction of El Dorado International Airport. In social issues Rojas Pinilla introduced women's political rights to vote.

His intentions to quell the violence consisted of giving an amnesty to armed peasants and expanding his agrarian reform. In 1954 Rojas Pinilla gave amnesties to those inmates incarcerated for acts of terrorism in the name of the Gómez regime. In 1955 Rojas Pinilla ordered a military offensive against rearmed peasants triggering a confrontation known as the "Guerra de Villarrica" (War of Villarrica) which took place in the central town of Villarrica in Tolima Department.

The conservative and liberal elite accused Rojas Pinilla of escalating the violence. After these events Rojas Pinilla tried to perpetuate himself in power and the population organized a general strike against Rojas Pinilla's new presidential term for the 1958-1962 period. Then on May 10 Rojas Pinilla was replaced by a five-man military junta and he went into exile.

== Creation ==
The political structure of the National Front was first set for a period of 16 years, in which each party would have two intercalated presidential terms. In 1968 the parties agreed to gradually and not suddenly dissolve the system. The free elections would then be reestablished in 1974 but would continue to share the bureaucracy until 1978. However, the reform stipulated that the triumphant party had to cede some degree of power to the defeated party. This "coalition" endured until 1986 when president Virgilio Barco offered a low participation to the opposing party and then decided to abolish it.

Dialogues between the Liberal and Conservative parties were set to quell the hate and differences and the first step was agreed in the "Accord of Benidorm" (Spain) on July 24, 1956, between Alberto Lleras Camargo and Laureano Gomez in which both parties noted the decadence of the democratic system and decided on a more egalitarian system. Then on March 20, 1957, both parties agreed against Rojas Pinillas reelection and supported free elections, this became known as the "Pact of March". Then followed the "Declaration of Sitges" also in Spain on July 20, 1957, between Lleras Camargo and Gómez where they decided to introduce the National Front for 16 years alternating the presidency after a referendum. Differences between the two party leaders finally quelled in November 1957 in the "Pact of San Carlos". Gómez had been living exiled in Spain after the coup by Rojas Pinilla. Both leaders agreed to allow the Colombian Congress to appoint the Conservative candidate to initiate the National Front.

== Development ==
After Rojas abdication, a military junta assumed power for a period between May 10, 1957, and August 7, 1958. During this period on December 1, 1957 the referendum took place in which the people of Colombia accepted the National Front. As a second phase of the plan on March 16, 1958, elections took place to elect the senate and lower house, and collegiate bodies for departments and municipalities to share equal power in the bureaucracy. The two prior scheduled elections for the years 1955 and 1957 never happened due to Rojas Pinilla's military mandate. For the National Front, each party was to present lists of nominees to compete among each other in the same party. The National Front established rules to run within parties and preserve in some way the democratic system.

The Conservative party could not reach an agreement on who would be its first candidate to govern and after consulting with the Liberal Party, both sides agreed to start with a Liberal candidate which was quickly fixed by congress in a constitutional amendment and which also extended the National Front from 12 to 16 years. In 1958 elections for the presidency are reestablished and on May 4, as expected Alberto Lleras Camargo is elected the first president of the National Front.

During the government of Lleras Camargo the parity among parties was reaffirmed. Congress decreed Legislative Act 1 on September 15, 1959, which stated "Article 1. During the three constitutional periods between August 7, 1962 and August 7, 1974, the Presidency of Colombia will be held in an alternating manner by citizens members of the two traditional parties; Liberals and Conservatives, so that the elected president for one term is opposite to the predecessor party. To start the alternations the seat of the President of Colombia for the period between August 7, 1962 and August 7, 1974 will be held by a citizen member of the Conservative party."

The National Front gradually pacified the bipartisan violence that endured for more than a century and generated the demobilization of some liberal guerrillas. However, social, economic and political problems continued and new guerrilla movements surged due to the general dissatisfaction and the adoption of new political ideas such as communism. In 1964 the Revolutionary Armed Forces of Colombia (FARC) guerrilla group was born and was followed by other groups such as the National Liberation Army (ELN) on January 7, 1965, the Popular Liberation Army (EPL) in July 1967, the Quintín Lame Movement (MAQL) in 1984 and the 19th of April Movement (M-19).

== Fall ==
Despite the limitations for members of third political parties to participate in the electoral process or become public employees, they achieved these by allying themselves with members of the Liberal or Conservative Party seeking outside votes or those against the National Front. The most notable of these maverick parties was the Liberal Revolutionary Movement (MRL), led by Alfonso López Michelsen and supported by the Colombian Communist Party (CPC), and the National Popular Alliance (ANAPO), which was founded by Rojas Pinilla in 1961. The ANAPO gradually regained popular support and in 1962 gained 6 representatives and 2 senators through the Conservatives lists. In 1964 the ANAPO elected 26 representatives. By 1966 the ANAPO had elected representatives in both party lines and was seen as a threat to the National Front. In 1970 the ANAPO achieved a staggering 14% of the Liberal seats and 20% of the Conservative seats.

Limitations were greater for those seeking the presidency that were not part of the party up next for the presidential turn. However, this did not impede some non aligned candidates to run for the presidency despite being declared null or illegal, trying to surpass the needed majority vote established by the National Front. This was the case of Rojas Pinilla who achieved 50,000 votes (1.8%) in the elections of May 6, 1962, then in 1966 a third of the total votes, and in 1970 a suspected majority of the votes against the conservative candidate Misael Pastrana Borrero during the last National Front election on April 19, 1970.

Pastrana Borrero was declared winner despite the accusations of electoral fraud by members of the ANAPO. Some of its members joined the armed guerrillas as a way to force institutional changes. This was the case of the 19th of April Movement (M-19) guerrilla group. Another effect of the dubious election was the sense of a predetermined results. The largest abstention resulted in 1966 resulting with 55.5% of the vote the chamber of representatives and senate and 60.1% for the presidential election.

=== Presidents of the National Front ===
- Alberto Lleras Camargo (1958–1962)
- Guillermo León Valencia (1962–1966)
- Carlos Lleras Restrepo (1966–1970)
- Misael Pastrana Borrero (1970–1974)

== Aftermath ==
One of the benefits of the National Front was the reduction in irrational polarization of traditional party members. By 1970, there was a 70% decrease in the number of people who identified themselves as part of either political party. The guerrilla groups created during this time greatly contributed to the evolution of the ongoing Colombian Armed Conflict.

== See also ==
- Colombian armed conflict (1964–present)
- Punto Fijo Pact
- Turno
