= María Eugenia Rojas Correa =

Colombian politician (born 1932)

María Eugenia Rojas

Senator of Colombia
- In office 20 July 1966 – 20 July 1974

Member of the Chamber of Representatives
- In office 20 July 1962 – 20 July 1964
- Constituency: Santander

Personal details
- Born: María Eugenia Rojas Correa; 6 October 1932 (age 93) Vélez, Santander, Colombia
- Party: National Popular Alliance
- Spouse: Samuel Moreno Diaz
- Relations: Gustavo Rojas Pinilla (father); Carolina Correa Londoño (mother)
- Children: Samuel Moreno Rojas; Néstor Iván Moreno Rojas
- Education: Trinity Washington University; Tulane University

María Eugenia Rojas Correa (born 6 October 1932) is a retired Colombian political figure.

== Life ==
Rojas is daughter of the 19th President of Colombia, Gustavo Rojas Pinilla and his wife Carolina Correa Londoño. Rojas Correa attended high school in Bogotá, Colombia and studied at the Catholic university Trinity Washington University in Washington D.C. and at Tulane University in New Orleans, Louisiana, United States.

During her father's government she fought for women's rights by getting the recognition of all their rights and helped create female police.

Rojas served as Member of the Chamber of Representatives of Colombia from 1962 to 1964, and as Member of the Senate of Colombia from 1966 to 1974.

During the 1974 Colombian presidential election, Rojas Correa became the first woman to run for president in all of Latin America, capturing about 20% of the vote to achieve third place in representation of the National Popular Alliance (ANAPO), the party that she and her father helped create. With her father's failing health, Rojas gained prominence in the leadership of ANAPO, shifting its platform and steering the movement towards populism modelled on the early promise of Peronism in Argentina.

During the 1982 Colombian presidential election, Rojas endorsed Belisario Betancur, who won the presidency and appointed her as national director of the Territorial Credit Institute [es].

In 1988, Rojas ran as a candidate for Mayor of Bogota in the municipal elections. In 2000, Rojas Correa promoted the election of her son Iván as mayor of Bucaramanga in Santander. After his election, Rojas served as the city's first lady.

== Personal life ==
Rojas is married to Samuel Moreno Díaz and has two sons, Samuel Moreno Rojas and Néstor Iván Moreno Rojas, who have both been involved in politics and have been involved in corruption scandals.
