= Gustavo Rojas Pinilla =

President of Colombia from 1953 to 1957

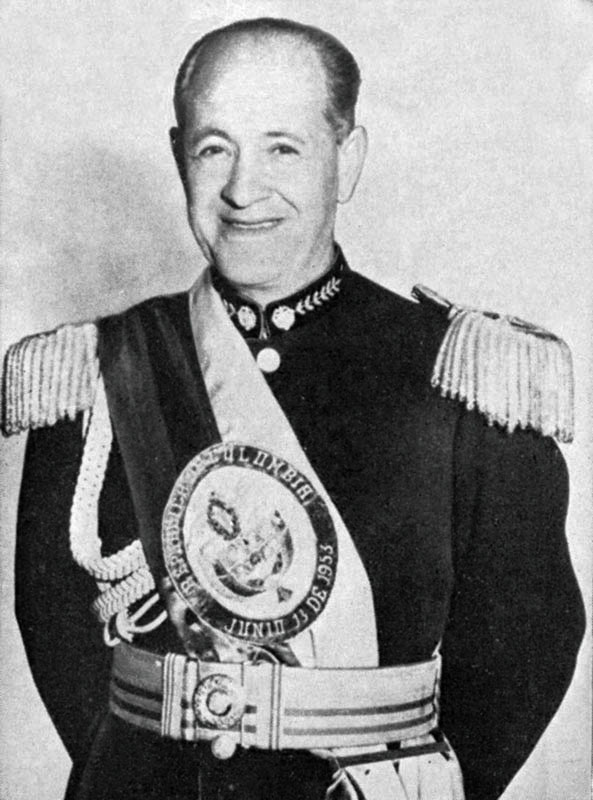

22nd President of Colombia
- In office 13 June 1953 – 10 May 1957
- Preceded by: Laureano Gómez
- Succeeded by: Gabriel París

General Commander of the Military Forces
- In office 31 May 1953 – 13 June 1953
- President: Laureano Gómez
- Preceded by: Régulo Gaitán
- Succeeded by: Hernando Camilo Zuniga

Minister of Posts and Telegraphs
- In office 3 December 1949 – 7 August 1950
- President: Mariano Ospina Pérez
- Preceded by: José Vicente Dávila Tello
- Succeeded by: José Tomás Angulo Lourido

Personal details
- Born: 12 March 1900 Tunja, Boyacá, Colombia
- Died: 17 January 1975 (aged 74) Melgar, Tolima, Colombia
- Party: National Popular Alliance
- Spouse: Carola Correa Londoño (1930–1975)
- Children: Gustavo Emilio Rojas Correa; María Eugenia Rojas Correa; Carlos Rojas Correa
- Education: José María Córdova Military School; Tri-State Normal College (BCE, 1927)
- Profession: Civil Engineer

Military service
- Allegiance: Colombia
- Branch/service: Army
- Years of service: 1920–1957
- Rank: General
- Battles/wars: Colombia-Peru War; Korean War; La Violencia

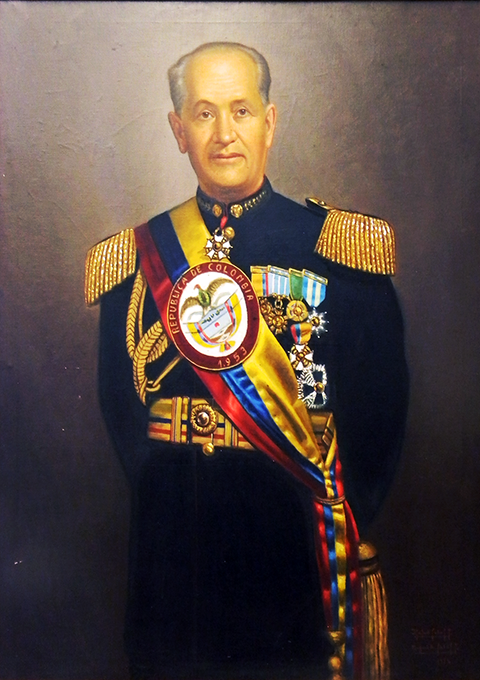
Portrait of Gustavo Rojas Pinilla

Gustavo Rojas Pinilla (12 March 1900 – 17 January 1975) was a Colombian army general, civil engineer and politician who ruled as President of Colombia in a military dictatorship from June 1953 to May 1957.

Rojas Pinilla gained prominence as a colonel during La Violencia, the period of civil strife in Colombia during the late 1940s and early 1950s that saw infighting between the ruling Conservatives and Liberal guerillas, and was named to the cabinet of Conservative President Mariano Ospina Pérez. In 1953, he mounted a successful coup d'état against Ospina's successor as president, the extreme right-wing Laureano Gómez Castro, imposing martial law. Seeking to reduce political violence, he ruled the country as a military dictatorship, allying himself with trade unionists, implementing infrastructure programs, and extending female suffrage. He was forced to step down due to public pressure in 1957.

Rojas Pinilla founded the National Popular Alliance (ANAPO) in 1961 in opposition to the National Front, the power-sharing agreement which the Conservatives and Liberals had brokered after he had been deposed. He contested the 1970 presidential election but was defeated by the National Front candidate, Conservative lawyer Misael Pastrana Borrero. However, Rojas Pinilla and his supporters alleged that the election had been fraudulent and illegitimate; the results caused ANAPO supporters to form M-19 guerilla movement, which would contribute to the country's insurgency unrest in the second half of the 20th century.

== Early life and education ==
Rojas was born in the city of Tunja, Boyacá, on March 12, 1900, to Julio Rojas Jiménez and his wife, Hermencia Pinilla Suárez. Spending his youth in Tunja, Villa de Leyva, and Arcabuco, he studied at the Tunja School of Presentation and earned a secondary degree at the Normal School of Tunjasu Leiva.

After graduating with a bachelor's degree in 1917, he entered the José María Córdova Military School in Bogotá as a cadet in 1917, graduating as a second lieutenant in 1920. In 1923 while serving in Manizales, Caldas, he was promoted to lieutenant in the army. He became dissatisfied with the army and in 1924 he requested permission to retire from active service. He continued his education at Tri-State College in the United States, where he obtained a degree in civil engineering in 1927 while working the assembly line at a Ford factory.

Returning to Colombia, he started taking part in the construction of highways and other works of engineering, managing the construction of the highway from Belén to Socha.

== Military career ==
In 1932, Rojas returned to the Army as Colombia went to war against Peru over the region. Recommissioned as a captain, he was posted to the 1st Artillery Group in Bogotá. In 1933, being assigned to command the coastal batteries of Buenaventura, a port city that was believed to be vulnerable to Peruvian attack. Buenaventura never came under attack, but the war concluded that year with the Rio Protocol, which recognized Colombia's claim to the disputed territory.

In 1936, he became the lead engineer of the army's ammunition factory; that same year, he was sent as an envoy to Nazi Germany, in order to obtain necessary machinery for munitions production in Bogotá. On his return to Colombia, he was named chief of the factory's technical department. In 1943, he visited the United States to secure weapons and other material, this time in the form of Lend Lease aid during the Second World War.

During this period, Rojas Pinilla also served as director of the Artillery School (from 1942) and assistant director of the School of War (from 1944). In 1945, he was named as Director General of Civil Aviation (at the time, an agency of the Ministry of War). It was there where he presented his project for airports in Colombia under the title "Landing Strips in Colombia," which served as a dissertation for his promotion to colonel of the Army; he would subsequently bring this initiative into being with the El Dorado Airport.

=== La Violencia ===
In 1946, now a colonel, Rojas was nominated as commander of the First Brigade in Tunja and in 1948 was named commander of the Third Brigade in Cali. There, he gained major recognition in the country for having managed to appease the rebellion that happened in this region as a consequence of the assassination of the popular leader Jorge Eliécer Gaitán on April 9, 1948, for which he was honoured by the incumbent Conservative President Mariano Ospina Pérez. On October 11, 1949, he was promoted to Lieutenant General and on October 19 assigned to the Army General Staff.

The ascension of Rojas in the military occurred during a schism in the ruling Conservative Party, between the moderate "Ospinists", supporters of the outgoing president, and the "Laureanists", supporters of the extreme right-wing Laureano Gómez Castro who was elected in 1950. Gómez was highly unpopular with Liberals, and even many Conservatives did not trust him to stem the escalating violence. Rojas himself belonged to the "Ospinist" camp, as evidenced by his promotion by Ospina over other officers with longer service time. On December 3, 1949, Rojas was appointed as Minister of Posts and Telegraphs. in the government of President Mariano Ospina Pérez.

In 1951, he was nominated as a delegate for Colombia to the United Nations in Washington, and as such he inspected the Colombia Battalion, then attached to the American 21st Infantry Regiment fighting in the Korean War. Rojas took offense at the overseas posting, which he interpreted as an intentional slight on Gómez's part, and returned to Colombia in September 1952.

In 1952, he was ascended to General of the Army and appointed as Chief of Staff of the Armed Forces of Colombia by Roberto Urdaneta Arbeláez, who was serving as interim president while Gómez took a leave of ill health. When Gómez returned to office, he ordered the immediate removal of Rojas; the Minister of War Lucio Pabón Núñez, an ally of Rojas, resigned rather than comply with the order.

== Coup d'etat ==
At this point, Ospina resolved to move decisively against Gómez. The former president contacted Rojas, who was at his finca in Melgar, on June 13, 1953. Rojas, who had been waiting for the situation to erupt, took the Caldas Battalion to the Casa de Nariño and, with Gómez nowhere to be found, offered power to interim president Urdaneta. Urdaneta, however, refused to take power without Gómez's resignation. At this point, Rojas and the coup plotters hesitated, apparently unsure of their next course of action. The testimony of Minister of War Pabón, corroborated by Urbaneta, described the confusion of the next few minutes:

I told Rojas... "there is no choice but for you to assume power, otherwise anarchy will reign." I opened the door of the office where Dr. Ospina and Dr. Urdaneta were speaking, and I told them: "I have come to tell you that General Rojas has just assumed the Presidency of the Republic." Dr. Ospina got up and with a markedly Antioquian accent told me: "Well, given the facts, there is no remedy in this case other than to accept it." I told them, "I think you should be the first to offer your support." I took the two of them to Rojas and I surprised him by saying: "Dr. Ospina and Dr. Urdaneta have come to offer you their support, aware that you have assumed the presidency." Rojas didn't know what to do. General Berrío Muñoz began to applaud and all the people applauded and thus Rojas was elected, very democratically.

Shortly after the bloodless coup was consolidated, it emerged that Gómez had fled with his family to New York City, solidifying Rojas' assumption of power. The coup was supported by the Ospinist Conservatives as well as Liberals, who hoped that Rojas would reestablish peace and political order in the nation.

== Presidency ==
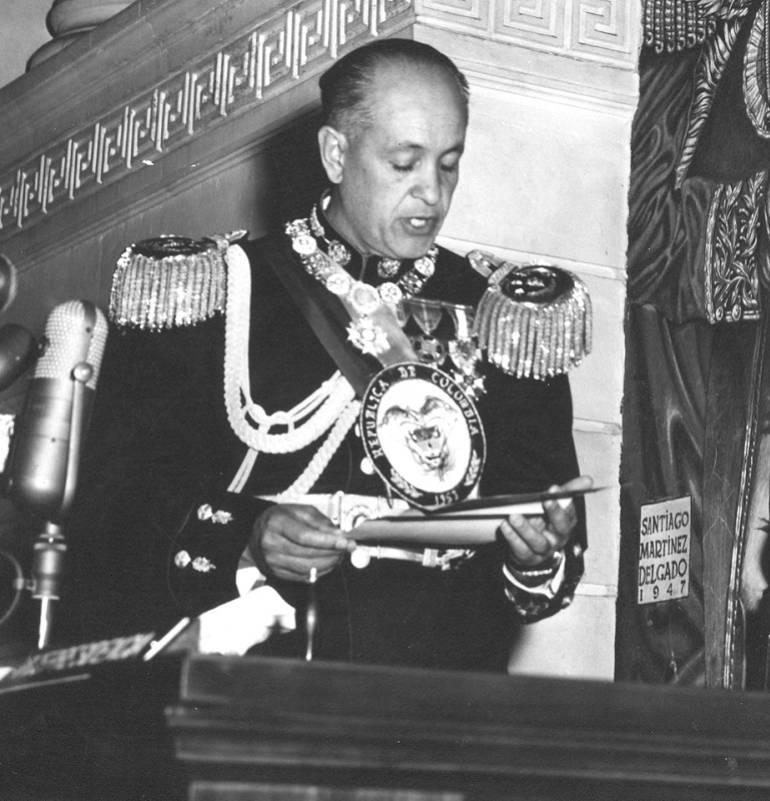
Rojas Pinilla announcing his assumption of the presidency

Rojas was the first president of Colombia to assume power through a coup d'état since José Manuel Marroquín in 1900, during the Thousand Days War, and the first to hold power with an active military commission since Santos Acosta overthrew Tomás Cipriano de Mosquera in 1867. He was military dictator of Colombia from 1953 to 1954, when he was officially designated President of Colombia. The National Constituent Assembly, by its Legislative Act Number 1 of 1953, appointed him as President of Colombia without a popular election.

Initially, the Rojas government hewed a moderately conservative line, and he appointed many Ospinists to his cabinet. Nevertheless, he earned the confidence of many Liberals when he announced amnesty for political prisoners and guerillas, and promised to lift censorship restrictions that had been imposed on the press. Almost immediately, Liberal guerillas began to surrender en masse. Liberal poet Darío Echandía called the whole turn of events a "coup of public opinion".

Rojas enacted legislation that gave women the right to vote. He introduced television and constructed several hospitals and universities and the National Astronomic Observatory. He was also a strong supporter of public works and infrastructure, promoting and conducting projects such as the Atlantic railway, the hydroelectric dam of Lebrija, and the oil refinery of Barrancabermeja. He also allied himself with organized labor, forming the Confederación Nacional del Trabajo, or CNT, as an independent alternative to the two Liberal and Conservative-dominated unions.

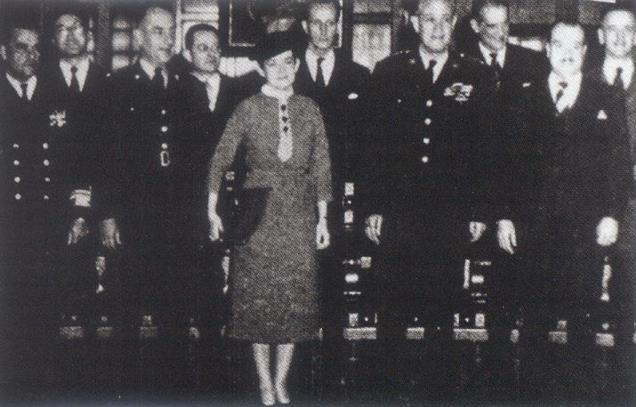
Rojas' cabinet included the first woman appointed to such a position, Education Minister Josefina Valencia Muñoz

The government's development programs alienated certain members of the industrial and mercantile sectors, who were especially displeased with the higher taxes that were imposed to fund the president's projects. Rojas' detractors compared his "demagogic" economic programme to the rule of Juan Perón in Argentina. Opposition from the Conservatives and the Roman Catholic Church forced Rojas to shutter the CNT in 1955.

The Liberals, on the other hand, viewed Rojas' rule as increasingly authoritarian. His promises of freedom of the press were not kept, and Liberal newspapers critical of the government were again shuttered. Rojas established a national radio station which consisted mostly of government-sponsored Catholic propaganda. Thousands of radios were distributed across the country, but these radios could only tune to the government-controlled station, Radio Sutatenza. Rojas also established a national gun permit system, making it more difficult for Colombians to obtain a gun.

From 1955, the Colombian economy began to struggle, as the price of coffee fell on the international market and the country entered a balance of payments crisis, forcing a loan from the IMF. The Rojas government was also embroiled in scandal after the Colombian Navy was accused of negligence, in an episode chronicled by Gabriel García Márquez in El Espectador.

Through the armed forces, Rojas communicated that he planned to rule for at least one more president term, until 1962. As opposition to his regime deepened, Liberal leader Alberto Lleras Camargo met with the exiled Conservative Laureano Gómez in the Spanish city of Benidorm in July 1956, signing a memorandum committing both their factions to "a return to juridical normalcy." Over the course of several months, figures like Ospina, Urdaneta, and Guillermo León Valencia all joined the "Pact of Benidorm," pledging to oppose Rojas' intended reelection by the Constituent Assembly.

Shortly after making his bid for reelection, Lleras and the Liberals called for a general strike starting on May 6, demanding Rojas resignation. On the morning of May 10, Rojas announced that he would cede power to a military junta of five military officers: General Gabriel París Gordillo, General Rafael Navas, General Luis E. Ordóñez, General Deogracias Fonseca and Admiral Rubén Piedrahita. The junta ruled until 1958, when a plebiscite re-adopted the 1886 constitution; Lleras was elected president that same year.

== Post-presidency ==
After resigning the presidency, Rojas went into exile in the Dominican Republic, under the protection of dictator Rafael Trujillo. Loyalists to Rojas opposed the military junta's plan to turn over control to a civilian government, and attempted to prevent the 1958 elections from going forward with an attempted coup d'état. The coup ultimately failed, and Lleras assumed power as the first president of the National Front.

=== Elections of 1962 ===
In the election of 1962 Rojas ran for the first time as the presidential candidate of his newly created ANAPO opposition party. He came in fourth, but his result was nonetheless declared invalid due to him being a former coup leader.

=== Elections of 1970 ===
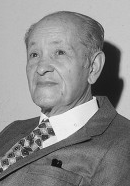
Rojas Pinilla in 1972

In the election of 1970 he ran again for the presidency, with a populist platform. He was defeated by a narrow margin by Misael Pastrana, but alleged that this was the result of fraud.

The presidential election of April 19, 1970, was difficult and controversial. Rojas and Misael Pastrana Borrero were both running for office. Rojas seemed to be winning the elections until a nationwide malfunction of communication systems happened. After these were restored, the votes had already been counted. The results were very close, giving a slight margin in favor of Pastrana Borrero. The supporters of Rojas challenged the results and accused the government of President Carlos Lleras Restrepo of fraud. The case was brought before the Electoral Court, which ruled in favor of Pastrana Borrero on July 15, 1970, certifying him as President of Colombia. This alleged electoral fraud led to the formation of the 19th of April Movement.

== Death and legacy ==
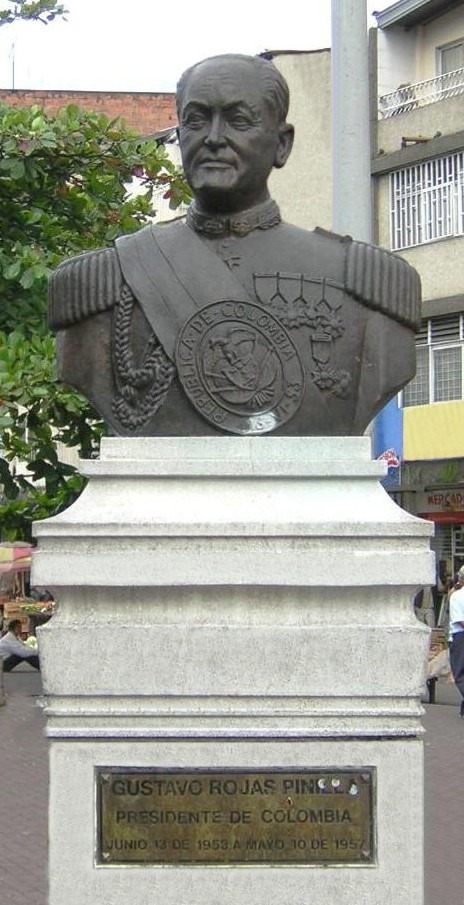
A bust of Rojas in Medellín

Rojas Pinilla died in Melgar, Tolima, on January 17, 1975. Rojas' daughter, María Eugenia Rojas, contested the 1974 Colombian general election as the leader of ANAPO, on an explicitly socialist platform. His grandson through María Eugenia, Samuel Moreno Rojas, would go on to serve as Mayor of Bogotá as part of the left-wing Alternative Democratic Pole, a successor party to ANAPO and M-19. Samuel Moreno, along with his brother Iván, would be arrested and charged with corruption in 2011.

=== Ideology ===
Though Rojas was himself a Conservative, his rule drew support from both sides of the Colombian political spectrum. His regime was characterized by populism, influenced by the policies and rhetoric of Juan Perón in Argentina. Rojas invoked the notion of a "Third Force" in society that could stand up to the "odious politicians" and "oligarchs" of the historic Liberal and Conservative Parties, by uniting the armed forces and organized labor. His efforts to formalize this "Third Force" into a political party were not successful.

After leaving power in 1957, Rojismo was crystallized by opposition to the National Front agreement. It drew from Peronism (which suffered a similar setback in Argentina after Peron was forced from power) as well as the ideas of French trade unionist Pierre Poujade, who attacked the parliamentary establishment and supported the interest of small business owners and the lower middle class. Rojas attacked the ruling elite, and especially the Conservative government of Guillermo León Valencia, as corrupt and cronyistic.

Historian Daniel García-Peña summed up Rojas' shifting ideological position and support bases:

He came to power with the support of the Liberals and the Ospinist Conservatives against Laureanism, and with very close relations with the United States. However, once in power, he forged his own program (the Third Force) of Peronist inspiration, causing the Liberal and Conservative oligarchies to unite to overthrow him and establish the National Front. With ANAPO, he emphasized the social dimension [of his policies], attracting various left-wing groups — yet his attitude towards electoral fraud was rather timid and the birth of M-19 was more than anything a reaction to his passivity.

Political offices
Preceded by Laureano Gómez Castro	President of Colombia; 1950–1953	Succeeded by Military Junta
