= Colombian Conservative Party =

Right-wing political party in Colombia

Colombian Conservative Party Partido Conservador Colombiano
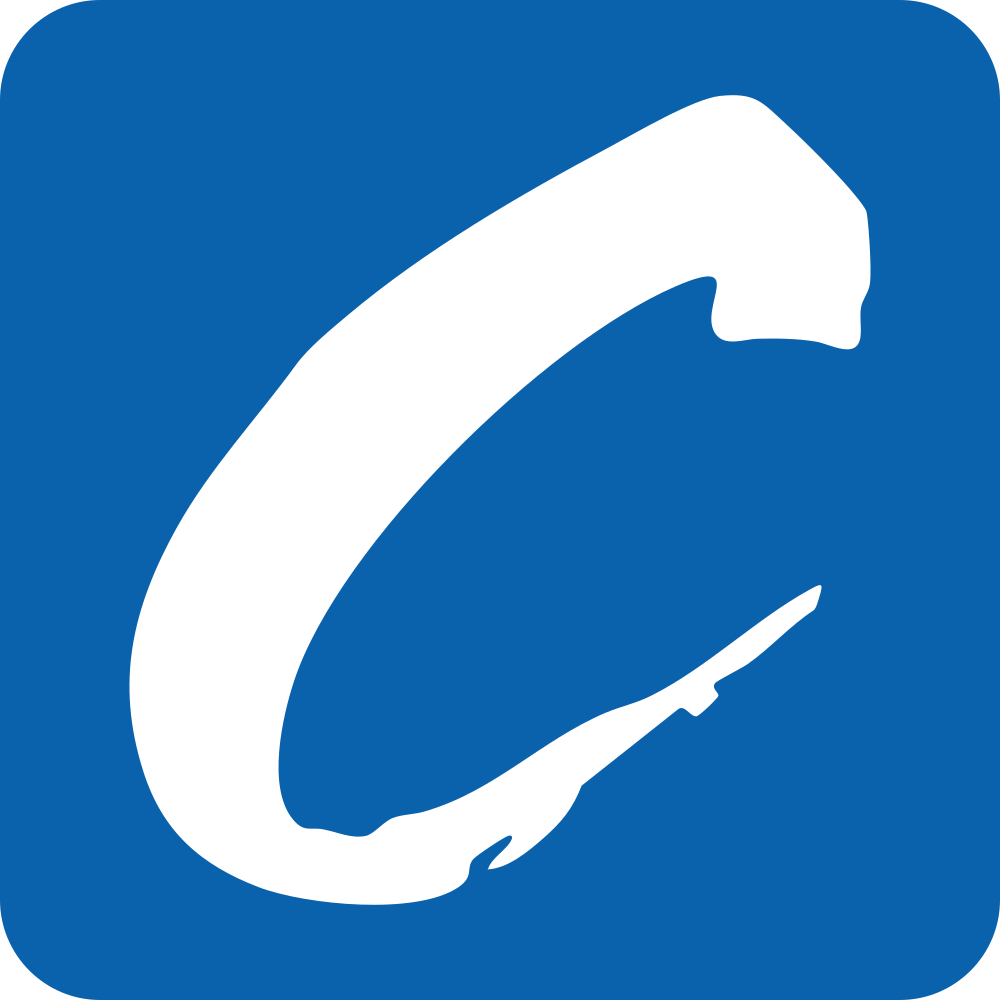
- President: Nadia Blel
- Founded: 4 October 1849; 176 years ago
- Headquarters: Avenida 22 37–09, Barrio La Soledad, Bogotá, D.C., Colombia
- Newspaper: El Tiempo
- Youth wing: Nuevas Generaciones
- Women's wing: Mujeres Conservadoras (Conservative Women)
- Ideology: Conservatism (Colombian); Christian democracy; Neoliberalism
- Political position: Centre-right to right-wing
- National affiliation: Team for Colombia (2021–2022)
- Regional affiliation: Union of Latin American Parties; Christian Democrat Organization of America
- International affiliation: International Democracy Union; Centrist Democrat International
- Colours: Blue
- Anthem: "Himno Partido Conservador Colombiano" "Hymn Of Colombian Conservative Party"
- Chamber of Representatives: 20 / 188
- Senate: 15 / 108
- Governors: 1 / 32
- Mayors: 194 / 1,102

Party flag

Website
- partidoconservador.com

The Colombian Conservative Party (Spanish: Partido Conservador Colombiano) is a conservative political party in Colombia. The party was formally established in 1849 by Mariano Ospina Rodríguez and José Eusebio Caro.

The Conservative Party along with the Colombian Liberal Party dominated the Colombian political scene from the end of the 19th century until 2002, in bipartisan political hegemony. The two parties were in direct military conflict between 1948 and 1958, during the civil war period known as La Violencia, after which they established the "National Front", agreeing to rotate power, intercalating for a period of four presidential terms. The election victory of independent candidate Álvaro Uribe in 2002 put an end to dominance of two party politics in Colombia.

The party was part of the coalition of Juan Manuel Santos from 2010 to 2014 and supported the conservative government of Álvaro Uribe from 2002 to 2010. It supported the leftist government of Gustavo Petro, despite noticeable differences in ideology. It currently supports the government of Abelardo de la Espriella.

== History ==
=== Origins ===
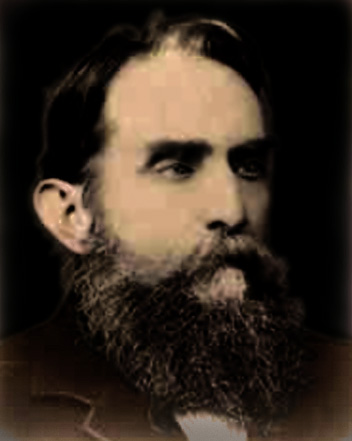
Liberal President Rafael Núñez switched to the Conservative Party and led the process known as "La Regeneración".

Lawyer José Ignacio de Márquez was elected president of Colombia in 1837. During his government, tensions between civil politicians and generals grew into the first civil war in Colombia. Marquez's supporters in the conflict were called the "Liberales ministeriales". After the war, known as the War of the Supremes (Spanish: Guerra de los Supremos), General Pedro Alcántara Herrán won the presidency. Alcántara created a new constitution, with conservative and centralist characteristics. Mariano Ospina Rodríguez, a prominent member of Alcántara's government, supported the return of the Jesuits to the country and reformed the education system.

Alcántara was succeeded in office by General Tomás Cipriano de Mosquera, whose supporters created the Liberal Party in 1848. One year later, Mosquera's detractors Ospina Rodríguez and José Eusebio Caro formed the Conservative Party, which grouped the ministerial liberals, most of the authorities of the Catholic Church and important landowners. In the newspaper La Civilización of October 4, 1849, Ospina and Caro published the conservative program that became the ideological platform for the new party. In 1851, in the Cauca department, certain fractions of the Conservative Party took up arms to fight against the abolition of slavery.

=== Regeneration ===
In 1863, the Liberal party created a new constitution in the city of Rionegro, which was opposed by the Conservative Party. The country began an unstable period of economic decay and multiple short civil wars between states and parties. In 1876, the independent liberal politician Rafael Núñez was defeated by the official liberal candidate Aquileo Parra. Núñez was in favor of reforming the state and ending the federal system, replacing it with a centralist system administered from the capital, Bogotá. He was the Liberal candidate for the presidency in 1880 and won the election, despite many leaders of his own party opposing him.

Núñez was re-elected in 1884 with the support of the Conservative Party, and began the process known as the Regeneration (Spanish: La Regeneración), in which a new constitution was written. The modern Republic of Colombia was founded with a centralized and protectionist government, and an education system managed by the Catholic Church. Universal suffrage, "contradictory with the hierarchical nature of the society", was abolished in 1880. Only those over the age of 21 with a "legitimate" trade or profession as means of subsistence, literate, earning at least $500 Pesos yearly (a substantial sum at the time) or owner of estates valued over $1500 Pesos could vote.

=== Conservative Hegemony ===
Following the events of the Regeneration, the Conservative Party remained in power in Colombia until 1930. During this period the country lost Panama to the United States. The overt partisanship and the use of the state power exacerbated old tensions, which would ultimately lead from small scale conflicts like the war of 1895 to historical periods such as "La Violence". Two notable violent episodes occurred in this period: the Thousand Days' War and the Banana massacre. During the Hegemony, the Central Bank (later the Bank of the Republic) was established, and the rail transport system that now crossed the country continued to improve. However, the emerging working class felt irritated with the consecutive conservative governments and began supporting the Liberal Party, winning the presidency with Enrique Olaya Herrera in 1930.

=== La Violencia ===
In 1946, after sixteen years of liberal governments, the conservative candidate Mariano Ospina Pérez won the presidency because the Liberal Party presented two candidates Gabriel Turbay and Jorge Eliécer Gaitán, neither of whom could gain a majority. Political violence had been on the rise during Ospina's term, and Gaitán became a victim of it during his second presidential bid. He was murdered in Bogotá on April 9, 1948. After his assassination, the period known as La Violencia began, in which popular unrest in cities caused uprisings like the Bogotazo riots. In the rural areas, members of the Liberal Party formed peasant guerrilla forces, which were then targeted by conservative and paramilitary forces. The Liberal Party boycotted the presidential election of 1950, which was won by the radical conservative Laureano Gómez. Gómez became the leader of the most radical faction of the Conservative Party, while Ospina formed a moderate faction friendly to the less extremist members of the Liberal Party.

=== National Front ===
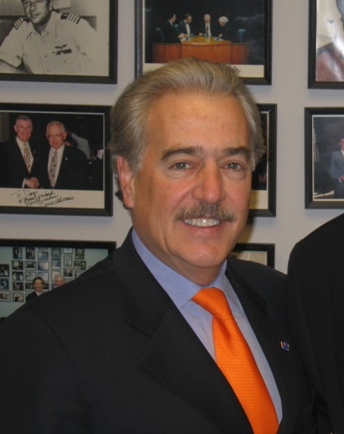
President Andrés Pastrana failed to give an end to the Colombian Armed Conflict through Peace Talks and later developed the Plan Colombia strategy with the government of the United States.

In 1953 a coup d'état against Gómez was led by the conservative General Gustavo Rojas Pinilla. Rojas was close to Mariano Ospina Pérez and his faction of the Conservative Party, as well as to some moderate liberals. Rojas began his government with the support of prominent politicians of both parties, yet he decided to make his own political party in 1955, the Popular Action Movement. Rojas censored and closed important newspapers and began seeking re-election.

Fearing a possible dictatorship, members of the Conservative and Liberal parties created an alliance called the National Front (Spanish: Frente Nacional) that prevented Rojas from being re-elected. The National Front was a pact in which for sixteen years, Conservatives and Liberals would share power locally and nationally, and govern the country by taking turns in the presidency. The Conservative Party would not present a candidate for the 1958 and 1966 presidential elections, and the Liberals would support the Conservative candidate in 1962 (Guillermo León Valencia) and 1970 (Misael Pastrana). During this historical period conservative dissidents led by Jorge Leyva Urdaneta opposed the pact, and presented him as presidential candidate in 1958 and 1962. Conservatives Belisario Betancur and Evaristo Sourdis were candidates for the 1970 election, losing against Pastrana.

=== Late 20th century ===
During the National Front the ideological differences between the parties started to disappear; however, the parties themselves survived because most of their members came from traditional families and political clans. Both parties were taken over by regional political lords, while traditional factions of the Conservative Party survived with new leaders. The Ospina faction survived through Misael Pastrana's son Andrés Pastrana, while Álvaro Gómez Hurtado, son of Laureano Gómez, led a dissident group called the National Salvation Movement. Gómez was murdered in 1995 in unclear circumstances, although some testimony claims that the killers were members of the government and the mafia. In 1982, conservative Belisario Betancur was elected president. After that, the party was in opposition until 1998, when Andrés Pastrana was chosen to be the president. The party used the name Social Conservative Party (Spanish: Partido Social Conservador) between 1990 and 1992.

During this period many new parties were formed, including some movements that seceded from the Conservative Party. Among them were the National Salvation Movement (mentioned above), the "Independent Conservatism" movement of the Gerlein family, Pastrana's independent party New Democratic Force, the National Conservative Movement, and the movement in Antioquia called "Unionismo".

=== 21st century ===
In 2002, although most Conservative senators and representatives initially backed Juan Camilo Restrepo in his bid for the presidency, the Conservative Party supported Álvaro Uribe in his campaign. Uribe was a former Liberal who ran as independent against the official liberal candidate Horacio Serpa. Restrepo was close to the government of Andres Pastrana and was criticized by members of his party who supported different candidates like Uribe and Noemí Sanín. In 2006, the Conservative Party supported Uribe's re-election and became the second largest party of his congressional coalition, after the Social Party of National Unity. In 2010, the Conservative Party won the second-greatest number of votes of any political force in Colombia, and joined Santos' coalition. In November, 2011 senator Efraín Cepeda was elected as the new president of the Conservative Party.

The Conservative Party increased its number of seats in the congress during the first decade of the 21st century. In the legislative elections of 2002, the Conservative Party won 13 of 102 seats in the Senate and 21 of 166 in the Chamber of Representatives. The party had the second highest number of votes, after the Liberal Party. Four years later, the Conservative Party won 18 seats in the Senate (5 more than in 2002) and 29 Representatives in the lower chamber (9 more than in 2002). The party stayed in the second place but this time after the Social Party of National Unity and above the Liberals. The situation was better for the conservatives in the elections of 2010, getting 22 senators and 36 seats in the Chamber of Representatives. As members of the uribista coalition and then of the National Unity Round Table (the government coalition of Juan Manuel Santos), the Conservative Party and the Social Party of National Unity have become ideological partners. In December 2011, the caucuses of the Conservative Party and the Social Party of National Unity created a pact to maintain the majority of both parties in the Chamber of Representatives.

The party was one of the most impacted by the Colombian parapolitics scandal, and it has been affected by corruption scandals that happened during the first decade of the 21st century in agencies of the government such as the Ministry of Agriculture, and the Dirección Nacional de Estupefacientes scandal. Conservative former president Andrés Pastrana spoke in favor of a change in the direction the party had taken. His comments generated a dispute with the party president, José Darío Salazar, who was being investigated by the Dirección Nacional de Estupefacientes at the time. In January 2012, the new president of the party, Efraín Cepeda, announced a modification of party rules in order to suspend the membership of those politicians who were under investigation.

Former attorney general Alejandro Ordóñez has become one of the most visible heads of the Conservative Party, and some groups inside the party supported a possible presidential campaign for him in 2014. Ordóñez is remembered for his conservative positions on moral and religious issues. However, other conservative politicians have sympathized with a reelection of Juan Manuel Santos.

Since 2014, due to disagreements with President Santos about the Colombian peace process and opposition to agreements with the FARC guerrillas, the party joined the opposition with the conservative Democratic Center, which also opposed making deals with the FARC. At the command of former president Andrés Pastrana, the party joined the movement to reject the peace agreements, claiming that signing an armistice agreement would allow the former guerrilla group to go unpunished. Despite attempts from President Santos to be inclusive and allow input from the opposition in the final agreement, the party's anti-peace stance did not permit them to collaborate. The party's primary focus was on the 2018 presidential election, in which former President Uribe's appointed candidate Iván Duque Márquez advocated reversing the peace process.

In 2017, former Conservative president Andrés Pastrana, one of the Conservative Party's few remaining major figures, claimed that the party is "absolutely corrupt". He also called two of the most important Conservative leaders "corrupt": Senate speaker Efraín Cepeda, and senator Hernán Andrade. Commentators believe his complaints are aimed at running independently in coalition with the ruling party, the Democratic Center, and receiving favors.

== Conservative presidents ==
Conservative Presidents of Colombia
Year elected	Name
1847	Rufino Cuervo y Barreto
1855	Manuel María Mallarino
1857	Mariano Ospina Rodríguez
1861	Bartolomé Calvo
1888	Carlos Hoguín Mallarino
1892	Miguel Antonio Caro
1899	Manuel Antonio Sanclemente
1900	José Manuel Marroquín
1904	Rafael Reyes Prieto
1909	Ramón González Valencia
1910	Carlos Eugenio Restrepo
1914	José Vicente Concha
1918	Marco Fidel Suárez
1922	Pedro Nel Ospina
1926	Miguel Abadía Méndez
1946	Mariano Ospina Pérez
1949	Laureano Gómez Castro
1951	Roberto Urdaneta Arbeláez
1962	Guillermo León Valencia
1970	Misael Pastrana Borrero
1982	Belisario Betancur Cuartas
1998	Andrés Pastrana Arango

Governments of other parties that the Conservative Party has supported.
Year elected	Name
1884	Rafael Núñez
1958	Alberto Lleras Camargo
1966	Carlos Lleras Restrepo
2002	Álvaro Uribe Vélez
2006	Álvaro Uribe Vélez
2010	Juan Manuel Santos
2018	Ivan Duque

== Ideology ==
=== Conservative program of 1849 (self-proclaimed) ===
- Constitutional order over dictatorship.
- Legality against violent methods.
- Christian morality and its civilized doctrine over immorality and the corrupt doctrine of atheism and materialism.
- Rational liberty over despotism.
- Legal equality over academic or aristocratic privileges, religious tolerance.
- Private property and its protection over socialism and communism.
- Security over arbitrariness.
- Civilization over barbarism.

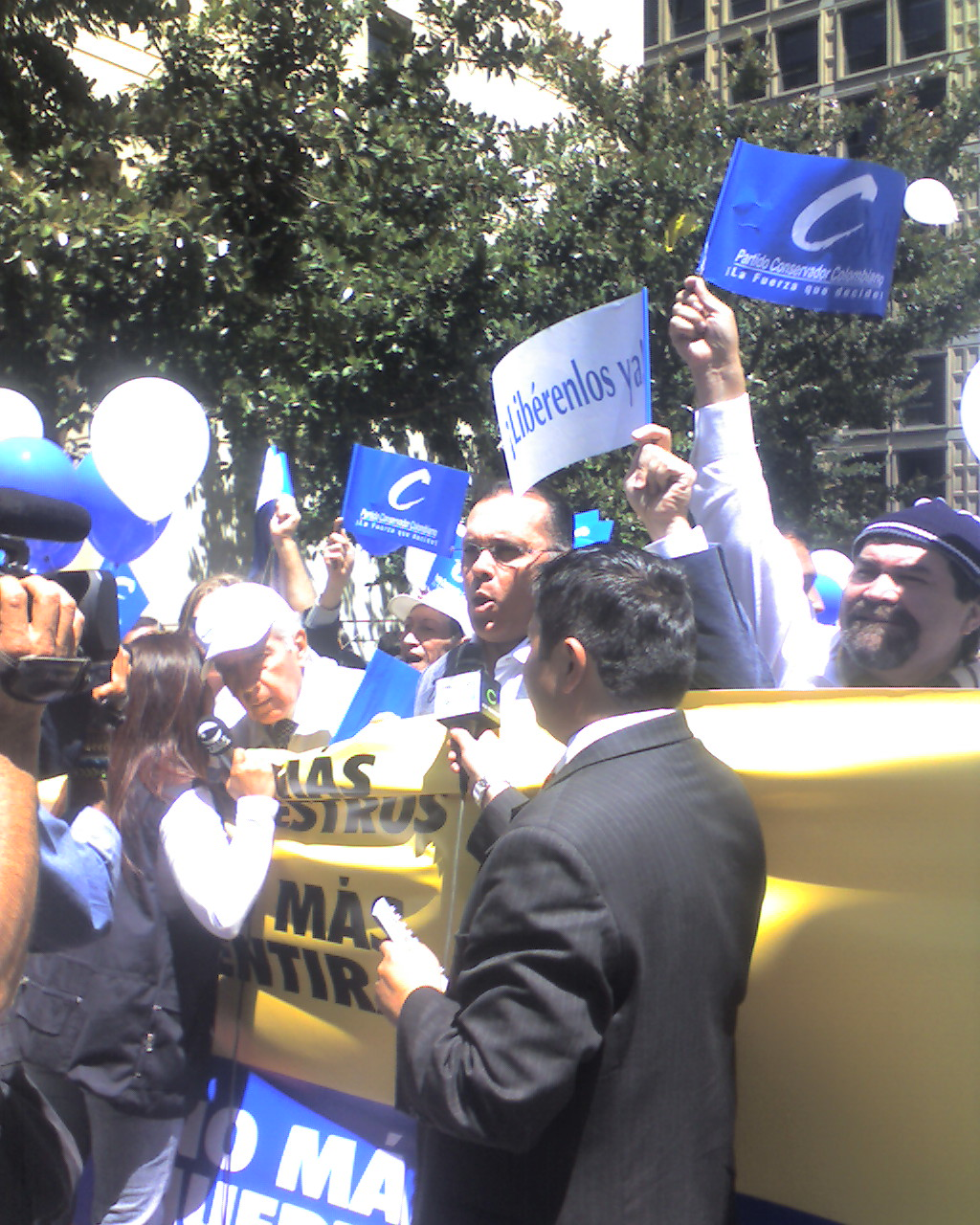
Colombian conservative party supporters

=== Current program (self-proclaimed) ===
The party's current program includes several objectives: to continue the search for peace in Colombia (following the examples of former presidents Guillermo León Valencia, Belisario Betancur and Andrés Pastrana, as members of the party), to preserve national unity and the continuing belief in God held by the majority of Colombians, the need for a reform of the 1991 constitution in order to correct some of its flaws to promote the modernization of the state, to fight unemployment, poverty, and lack of security and to extend and defend property rights.

- Belief of God being the center of the universe.
- Belief in private systems.
- Belief in fighting communism and all its ideals.
- Belief in tradition.
- Belief in free trade.
- Belief in an organized society
- Belief in defending family and life before anything.
- Belief that these are the ideals that will provide a better future for the Colombian Society.

== Electoral history ==
The Colombian Conservative Party is usually the second largest single party in the Colombian Congress, though far behind the numbers corresponding to the Colombian Liberal Party or those of multiple independent factions and candidates.

From 1958 to 1978 it, and the other major party, the Colombian Liberal Party, shared power as the result of the National Front agreement that followed the fall of General Gustavo Rojas Pinilla.

The Colombian Conservative Party has become a close political ally of President Álvaro Uribe, who was formerly a member of the opposing Liberal party. The party did not present its own candidate for the 2006 presidential elections, and instead supported President Uribe's reelection.

In 2010, the party held for the first time, primary elections to choose a candidate for presidency. Noemí Sanín was nominated presidential candidate of the Conservative Party, the first woman to do so.

In legislative elections of 2006 the party won 29 out of 166 seats in the Chamber of Representatives and 18 out of 100 seats in the Senate.

In 2010, the party won 23 seats in Senate and 37 in the chamber of Representatives.

=== Presidential elections ===
Election Year	Candidate	First Round		Second Round		Result
Election Year	Candidate	Votes	Percentage	Votes	Percentage	Result
1974	Álvaro Gómez Hurtado	1,634,879	31.44 (#2)			Lost
1978	Belisario Betancur	2,356,620	46.59 (#2)			Lost
1982	Belisario Betancur	3,189,278	46.75 (#1)			Won
1986	Álvaro Gómez Hurtado	2,588,050	35.84 (#2)			Lost
1990	Rodrigo Lloreda Caicedo	735,374	12.25 (#4)			Lost
1994	Andrés Pastrana	2,604,771	44.98 (#2)	3,576,781	48.45 (#2)	Lost
1998	Andrés Pastrana	3,653,048	34.37 (#2)	6,114,752	50.34 (#1)	Won
2002	Supported Álvaro Uribe	5,862,655	53.05 (#1)			Won
2006	Supported Álvaro Uribe	7,397,835	62.35 (#1)			Won
2010	Noemí Sanín	893,819	6.13 (#5)			Lost
2014	Marta Lucía Ramírez	1,997,980	15.52 (#3)			Lost
2018	Did not run					—
2022	Supported Federico Gutiérrez	5,069,526	23.94 (#3)			Lost
2026	Did not run					—
