= National Popular Alliance =

Political party in Colombia, 1961–1998

- President: Gustavo Rojas Pinilla
- Founded: 1961
- Dissolved: 1998
- Split from: Colombian Conservative Party
- Merged into: Independent Democratic Pole
- Headquarters: Bogotá
- Ideology: Left-wing nationalism Populism; Progressivism; Faction: Socialism
- Political position: Left-wing

Party flag

The National Popular Alliance or ANAPO (Alianza Nacional Popular) was a political party in Colombia. It was founded in 1961 as a movement by the ex-president Gustavo Rojas Pinilla and was disbanded in 1998. Many ANAPO leaders and militants joined the Independent Democratic Pole coalition.

Anapo's political platform has been labeled as left-wing. Nonetheless, Anapo made it clear that they differ from Communists regarding the rights of private property.

== History ==
The party's political height grew during the mid-to-late 1960s and the beginning of its decline came in 1970, after what is commonly perceived as its zenith by historians. It was founded in 1964 by a group of politicians led by Gustavo Rojas Pinilla, who left the Conservative Party of Colombia.

=== The 1970 Elections ===
==== Defeat or Fraud? ====
The year of 1970 saw the electoral defeat of its presidential candidate, the former dictator General Gustavo Rojas Pinilla, at the hands of the Conservative candidate of the National Front, Misael Pastrana Borrero, after a close April 19 election which ANAPO and several prominent figures of Colombian public opinion condemned as fraudulent at the time.

The accusation has been maintained by ANAPO and most opposition parties ever since. Polls have shown that subsequently it has almost become a fact accepted by the political mainstream in Colombia as of 2005, specifically due to the gradual surfacing and historical evaluation of supporting evidence, memoirs and testimonies.

==== Aftermath ====
Initially, ANAPO tried to declare the elections illegitimate, both by actively calling for a citizen protest or uprising, and also by demanding that Colombia's Electoral Court abstain from supporting the official result. The Court denied this request and recognized Misael Pastrana as president elect.

ANAPO's reaction created alarm in many National Front politicians and media outlets, who supported the announced result. President Carlos Lleras Restrepo vehemently denied the charges of fraud and argued that his responsibility was to hand over power to the legally recognized winning candidate. The government declared a state of siege in order to try to stop riots from erupting, signs of which appeared mainly in Bogotá but also in some other regions of the country.

In 1972, a group of National Congress deputies from the ANAPO formed a splinter group called Broad Colombian Movement (Movimiento Amplio Colombiano, abr. MAC) which soon joined the left-wing National Union of Opposition.

In 1974, the 19th of April Movement (M-19), a Colombian guerrilla group, came into the public scene and claimed that its struggle was a reaction to what it called the illegitimacy of the 1970 elections, the nation's bipartisan political system, and the National Front agreement that had supported them.

Initially, the M-19 hoped to actively incorporate ANAPO leaders and party members as its political representatives, but many, including ANAPO chief Maria Eugenia Rojas, ultimately rejected any attempt to actively establish such an association.

== Recent Electoral Status ==
After the political reform of 2003, it disappeared entirely, joining a coalition of leftist parties known as Polo Democrático Independiente that became the political party Polo Democrático Alternativo in 2005.
