= Guillermo Alfonso Jaramillo =

Colombian politician (born 1950)

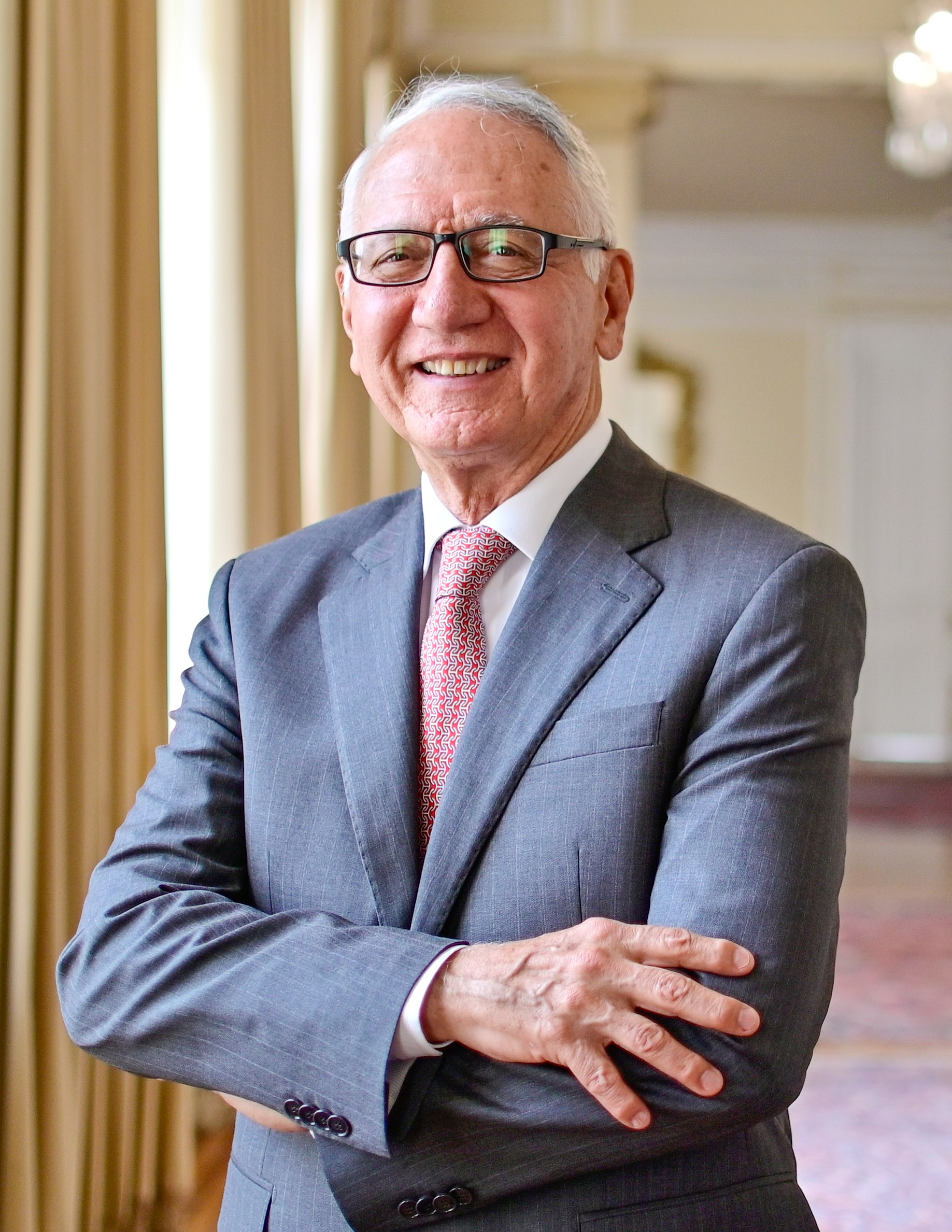
- Official portrait, 2023

Minister of Health and Social Protection
- In office May 1, 2023 – August 7, 2026
- President: Gustavo Petro
- Preceded by: Carolina Corcho

Mayor of Ibague
- In office January 1, 2016 – December 31, 2020
- Preceded by: Luis Hernando Rodríguez
- Succeeded by: Andrés Fabian Hurtado

Secretary of Government of Bogotá
- In office May 8, 2013 – February 10, 2024
- Mayor: Gustavo Petro
- Preceded by: Guillermo Asprilla
- Succeeded by: Hugo Zárate

Secretary of Health of Bogotá
- In office January 1, 2012 – May 8, 2013
- Mayor: Gustavo Petro
- Preceded by: Cecilia Sierra
- Succeeded by: Hugo Zárate

Senator of Colombia
- In office September 13, 2009 – July 20, 2010

Governor of Tolima
- In office January 1, 2001 – December 31, 2004
- Preceded by: Carlos Stefan
- Succeeded by: Jorge García
- In office August 25, 1986 – July 5, 1987
- Preceded by: José Osorio Bedoya
- Succeeded by: Juan Tole Lis

Member of the Chamber of Representatives
- In office July 20, 1982 – July 20, 1986
- Constituency: Tolima

Personal details
- Born: Guillermo Alfonso Jaramillo Martínez; June 25, 1950 (age 76) Líbano, Tolima, Colombia
- Party: Liberal (1976-1997); Social and Political Front (1999-2003); Democratic Pole (2003-2011); Progressive Movement (2011-2014); Indigenous and Social Alternative Movement (2015-2020); Humane Colombia (2021-present)
- Other political affiliations: Decency List (2017-2021) Historic Pact (2021-present)
- Education: Del Rosario University; University of Lund; University of Uppsala

Guillermo Alfonso Jaramillo Martínez (born June 25, 1950) is a Colombian politician and surgeon, graduated from the Universidad del Rosario, with specializations in cardiovascular and thoracic surgery from the University of Lund, and in pediatric cardiac surgery from the University of Uppsala, both in Sweden. He was elected governor of the department of Tolima on two occasions, one by presidential appointment and the other by popular election. He was a Senator of Colombia and Secretary of Government and Health of Bogotá Was elected mayor of Ibagué, for the period 2016–2019. Since May 1, 2023, he is the Minister of Health and Social Protection, in the administration of Gustavo Petro.

Political offices
Preceded by Carolina Corcho	Minister of Health and Social Protection; 2023–present	Incumbent
Preceded by Luis Hernando Rodríguez	Mayor of Ibague; 2016-2020	Succeeded by Andrés Fabian Hurtado
Preceded by Guillermo Asprilla	Secretary of Government of Bogotá; 2013-2014	Succeeded by Hugo Zárate
Preceded by Cecilia Sierra	Secretary of Health of Bogotá; 2012-2013	Succeeded by Hugo Zárate
Preceded by Carlos Stefan	Governor of Tolima; 2001-2004	Succeeded by Jorge García
Preceded by José Osorio Bedoya	Governor of Tolima; 1986-1987	Succeeded by Juan Tole Lis
Order of precedence
Preceded by Martha Carvajalino as Minister of Agriculture and Rural Development	Order of precedence of Colombia as Minister of Health and Social Protection since May 1, 2023	Succeeded by Antonio Sanguino as Minister of Labour
