= Bernardo Henao Mejía =

Colombian physician and politician

Minister of Public Health of Colombia
- In office 13 June 1953 – 20 January 1956
- President: Gustavo Rojas Pinilla
- Preceded by: Alfonso Tarazona
- Succeeded by: Gabriel Velásquez Palau

Acting Minister of Agriculture
- In office 4 February 1955 – 21 March 1955
- Minister: Juan Guillermo Restrepo Jaramillo

Personal details
- Spouse: Susana Valencia Bejarano
- Parent(s): José Tomás Henao Jaramillo, Clementina Mejía Jaramillo
- Occupation: Physician, politician

Bernardo Henao Mejía was a Colombian physician and politician.

Son of José Tomás Henao Jaramillo, an acclaimed Antioquian doctor, and Clementina Mejía Jaramillo, Henao Mejía was the first director of the Hospital San Juan de Dios, in Armenia.

During the government of the General Gustavo Rojas Pinilla, he served as Minister of Public Health of Colombia. During his time in the ministry, he regularized the exercise of optometry and supported the peace process that was being carried out with the Liberal Guerrillas. He also was Acting Minister of Agriculture.
