= Mauricio Santamaría =

Colombian economist and politician

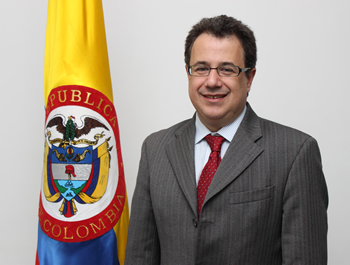

General Director of National Planning
- In office 24 January 2012 – 7 October 2017
- President: Juan Manuel Santos
- Preceded by: Hernando José Gómez
- Succeeded by: Tatyana Orozco

Minister of Health and Social Protection
- In office 3 November 2011 – 24 January 2012
- President: Juan Manuel Santos
- Preceded by: Juan Luis Londoño
- Succeeded by: Beatriz Londoño Soto

Minister of Social Protection
- In office 7 August 2010 – 3 November 2011
- President: Juan Manuel Santos
- Preceded by: Diego Palacio Betancourt
- Succeeded by: Office abolished

Personal details
- Born: 19 August 1966 (age 60) Bogotá, D.C., Colombia
- Education: University of the Andes (BA Econ); Georgetown University (M.Econ, Ph.D.)
- Profession: Economist

Mauricio Santamaría Salamanca (born 19 August 1966) is a Colombian economist and politician, who previously served as Director of the National Planning Department of Colombia. He served as the 3rd Minister of Social Protection during the Administration of President Juan Manuel Santos Calderón from 2010 until its restructuring amidst a wider Ministerial Reform when the Ministry was divided into separate Health and Labour ministries, being reappointed then as the 1st Minister of Health and Social Protection of Colombia until 2012 when he was reassigned. An economist from Georgetown University, Santa María has worked as a Consultant and Senior Economist for the World Bank, was Deputy Director of the National Planning Department, and prior to his appointment served as Adjunct Director of the Colombian Foundation of Higher Education and Development (Fedesarrollo).
