= 2011 Colombian student protests =

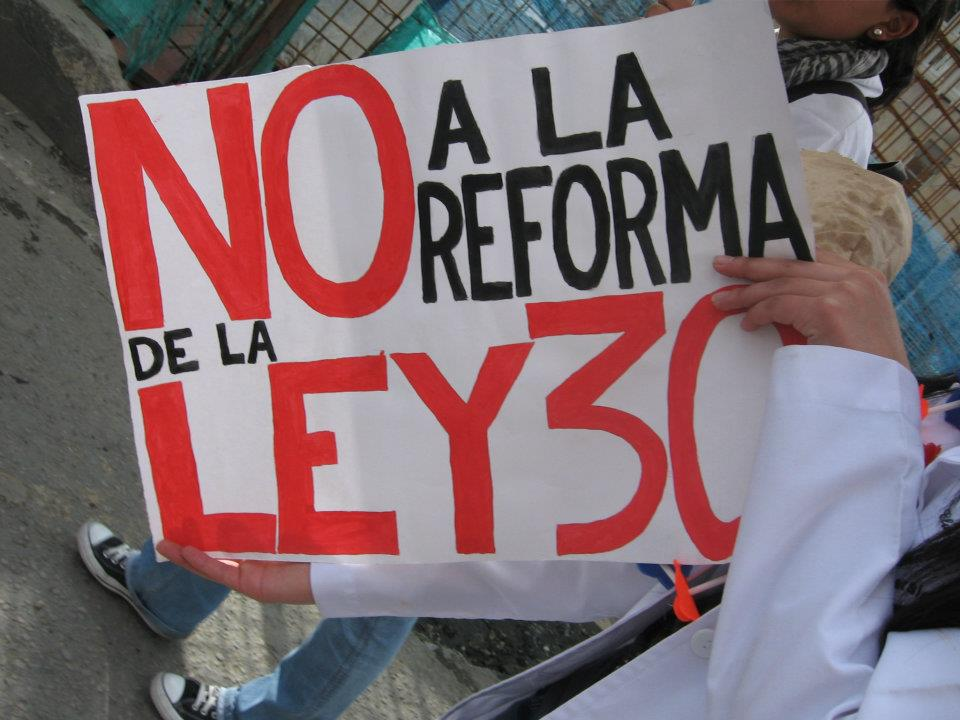
Poster against the superior education reform. It says: "No to the reform of#30 law".

The 2011 Colombian student protests consisted of a series of demonstrations led by students, some teachers, university employees, and unions, which started on October 12. These demonstrations took place throughout the Colombian territory in protest against the draft of the Higher Education Reform Project presented by the National Government to the Congress of the Republic in October 2011.

Student leader Jairo Rivera had claimed that Colombian education is drifting toward "the Chilean model", which was something he warned against and said that "the Chilean model is the one to not follow".

2011 Colombian student protests and 2011 Chilean student protests leaders have announced a joint bi-national student protest for November 24, 2011. Chilean newspaper The Clinic have pointed out that these two student protests have in common that they broke out in the only two South American countries ruled by right-wing presidents.

== Causes and antecedents ==
=== Proposal for the reform of higher education ===
The Higher Education Reform Project presented by the government of Juan Manuel Santos and his Minister of Education, María Fernanda Campo, aimed to modify Law 30 of 1992, which regulates higher education in Colombia. The draft was presented for the first time in front of the deans of some universities on March 10, 2011, and in the following months it circulated throughout the community of universities. The proposal included various points that didn’t sit well with the teachers’ union who alleged that the reform didn’t guarantee the right to an education, since it didn’t offer universities the resources necessary to operate.

=== For-Profit Universities ===
3,606,532 high school graduates in Colombia were not admitted into college between 2001 and 2010. To solve this problem, the reform proposal considered the creation of for-profit universities. This was the aspect of the proposal that caused the most upset among the community of universities. They argued that, while the enrollment numbers have increased in countries where this model was implemented, like Brazil, the collateral effect has been a severe diminution of the quality of the institutions.

Faced with the proposal of for-profit universities, the student movement began the organization of multiple demonstrations on the national territory. Among these was the massive march of April 7. These initial demonstrations led to the government’s discontinued interest in creating for-profit universities on August 23, however the proposal for reform continued provoking rejection from the community of universities.

=== Educational Credits ===
The draft of the law considered a major investment in student loans through the Colombian Institute of Student Loans and Technical Studies Abroad. These loans would be paid by the beneficiaries once they finish their studies and enter the workforce, with the possibility of debt forgiveness for outstanding grades.

This aspect of the proposal was criticized by the community of universities, considering it was detrimental to public education and only favored the private universities who receive the students with loans. In addition, the reform permitted coercive collection in order to guarantee debt payment acquired by the students.

=== Other Contested Issues ===
The draft for the reform of higher education also aimed to:

- Establish economic autonomy for the public universities, while the university autonomy would continue to be compromised given that the school board would be primarily composed of outside stakeholders.
- Establish the same legislation for universities and higher education institutions, requiring that they offer careers and courses in a flexible manner, regardless of their denomination.
- Make it possible to declare Corporate Insolvency in state and private institutions.
- Establish the rationalization and optimization of human, physical, technical, and financial resources as a primary objective of state universities.
- Apply the administrative system of private institutions to the mixed higher education institutions.
- Permit the formation of teacher unions for hourly workers.
- Permit the government to allocate public resources to private universities.
- Allow each higher education institution to determine their own protocol for imposing sanctions of any type, from warnings to suspensions and expulsions.
- Diversify the funds that the state institutions of higher education should provide, forcing them to compete for public resources and sustain themselves through service sales and tuition increases.
- Establish deadlines for the improvement of the quality and services in the higher education institutions in order to either approve or deny their nomination.
- Increase the enrollment capacity in public and private institutions of higher education.
- Temporarily limit the resources allocated to state institutions of higher education, keeping in mind the increase of the GDP and its repercussions.

== The March of April 7 ==
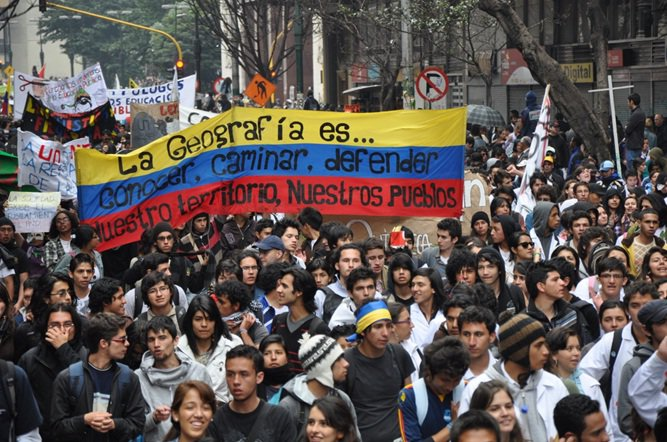
Students marching on April 7, 2011, against the proposed education reform

On April 7, 2011, the first large protest of unions, teachers, and students took place during the governance of Juan Manuel Santos; during which they demanded better salaries for teachers, pensioners, and employees, as well as improvements in labor and trade union rights. They also rejected the reform of higher education presented by the government, the National Plan of Development from 2010-2014, the privatization of the Telecommunications Company of Bogotá, the Initial Employment Law, the fiscal sustainability, Law 100 of 1993, and the Free Trade Agreements.

The marches developed over a large part of the national territory and more than one hundred organizations participated: all of the public universities, some private universities, the Trade Union Association of University Professors, some public and private high schools, the World Organization of Students (WOS), the Colombian Student Organization, the Federation of University Students, the Association of Colombian University Students, the National Student Identity Process, the Red Revolt, the National University Federation, the Student Union (Six Colombia), the Red Independents, the Collective Critical Thought, and a number of student groups, in addition to the Central Workers Union, the Colombian Federation of Educators, the Workers Union of the Telecommunications Company of Bogotá (SINTRATELÉFONOS), and the workers of the Aqueduct and Sewer Company of Bogotá, among others.

The marches developed across the country and more than one hundred organisations participated including:

- All public universities
- Some private universities
- World Organisation of Students (Organización Mundial de Estudiantes-OME)
- Colombian Organisation of Students (Organización Colombiana de Estudiantes-OCE)
- Federation of University Students (Federación de Estudiantes Universitarios-FEU)
- Colombian Association of University Students (Asociación Colombiana de Estudiantes Universitarios-ACEU)
- National Student Identity Process (Proceso Nacional Identidad Estudiantil)
- Revolt Network (Red Revuelta)
- National Federation of Universities (Federación Universitaria Nacional-FUN)
- The Student Union (Sies Colombia)
- The Independent Network (La Red Independientes)
- The Critical Thought Collective (el Colectivo Pensamiento Crítico)
- Central Union of Workers (Central Unitaria de Trabajadores-CUT)
- Colombian Federation of Educators (Federación Colombiana de Educadores-FECODE)
- Trade Union of ETB Workers (SINTRATELÉFONOS)
- The workers of the Bogota Bureau of Aqueducts and Sewage (Empresa de Acueducto y Alcantarillado de Bogotá-EAAB)
- Numerous student collectives

== Development ==
=== National University Strike ===
Despite opposition presented from the beginning towards the Higher Education Reform Project, it was ratified by the National Government before the Congress of the Republic on October 3, 2011. From there most of the Higher Education Institutions began to organize committees in which they made decisions regarding how to demonstrate their opposition to the article

Despite opposition presented from the beginning towards the Higher Education Reform Project, it was ratified by the National Government before the Congress of the Republic on October 3, 2011. From there most of the Higher Education Institutions began to organize committees in which they made decisions regarding how to demonstrate their opposition to the article.

The National Strike, as a mechanism of student action, had an initial organization process at the national level that began in the month of September, assembling a significant number of universities. It also worked with international consultants. As of October 12, 32 public universities then declared an indefinite strike and asserted that it would not end until the Reform Project was repealed by Congress and were offered guarantees for a democratic design of a new project.

On numerous occasions national marches against the reform took place on April 7, September 7, October 7, October 12, October 26 and also included the March of Torches on November 3, Taking Bogotá on November 10, and the Continental Day of Mobilization for Education on November 24.

In the march of October 12, 2011, medical student at the Universidad Santiago de Cali, Jan Farid Cheng Lugo, died from the launch of an explosive device by unidentified people (the facts are confidential) during the strike convened by la Mesa Amplia Nacional de Estudiantes. La Mesa Amplia Nacional Estudiantil (MANE) reported that the death of the young man was not an accident but a murder resulting from a device thrown by unknown people from a bridge. This version was confirmed by forensic analysis that established murder as the motive behind the death; the details are still being clarified.

== Consequences ==
On November 9, 2011, one day before one of the largest marches of 2011 took place in Bogotá called Toma a Bogotá (Taking Bogotá), after a meeting with congressmen from both chambers of the sixth commission of Congress of the Republic, President Juan Manuel Santos announced that the government would be willing to repeal through constitutional procedure the Higher Education Reform Project, only if the students returned to academic normalcy. Nevertheless, the students, represented by la Mesa Amplia Nacional Estudiantil (MANE), expressed they would continue with cessation of academic activities and with scheduled protests until the government effectively repealed the proposal from Congress and guaranteed an arrangement for the design of a more democratic proposal, that included the requests and need of the entire educational community, and that allowed the protest scheduled for Thursday, November 10 to remain scheduled

November 11 gave way to what is considered as the first victory of the 2011 student protests, when president Santos agreed to the demands of the students and ratified in the Congress of the Republic the request to repeal the Higher Education Reform project. On November 16, the sixth commission of the House of Representatives approved - with 11 votes in favor and none against - the request to repeal the reform. As a consequence of the measures on the part of the government, the students decided to end the National University Strike that lasted little more than a month.

The government committed itself to creating democratic spaces for the design of a new higher education reform that responded to the demands of the university community and the rest of the country. The students, on their side, committed to participating in such spaces for dialogue and designing a new reform. Since there didn’t exist word-for-word guarantees of the government’s compromise, the students declared, nevertheless, they would remain alert to any breaches in the agreement. A few months after these agreements, then Minister of Education María Fernanda Campo claimed that the National Council for Higher Education (CESU, the advisory state agency presided over by the minister, would be the only platform for designing a new higher education law, which was interpreted by the student movement as a breach of what was agreed on since they considered they were not guaranteed to participate in the CESU.

As a result, the students organized under MANE began the design of a Proposal for an Alternative Higher Education Law through multiple meetings in different cities. For its part, the national government, by means of the CESU, undertook the design of Public Policy of Higher Education. In 2014, it presented to the country a document named Acuerdo por lo Superior 2034, that contains guidelines for the sector between 2014 and 2034. Given the design of these guidelines, contrary to what had been agreed on to lift the 2011 strike, the contributions of the student organizations were once again left out. MANE has posed the possibility of a new protest. Likewise, the government document has received criticism on different occasions, like Ignacio Mantilla, Rector of la Universidad Nacional; the Congress of the Republic by means of senator Jorge Enrique Robledo, Jesús Alberto Castilla and Senén Niño; House Representatives Víctor Correa Vélez and Ángela María Robledo, and Andean Constituent for the Republic of Colombia Alexander Ferms, in terms of international representation.

== See also ==
- List of protests in the 21st century
