= Jhenifer Mojica =

Colombian politician and economist

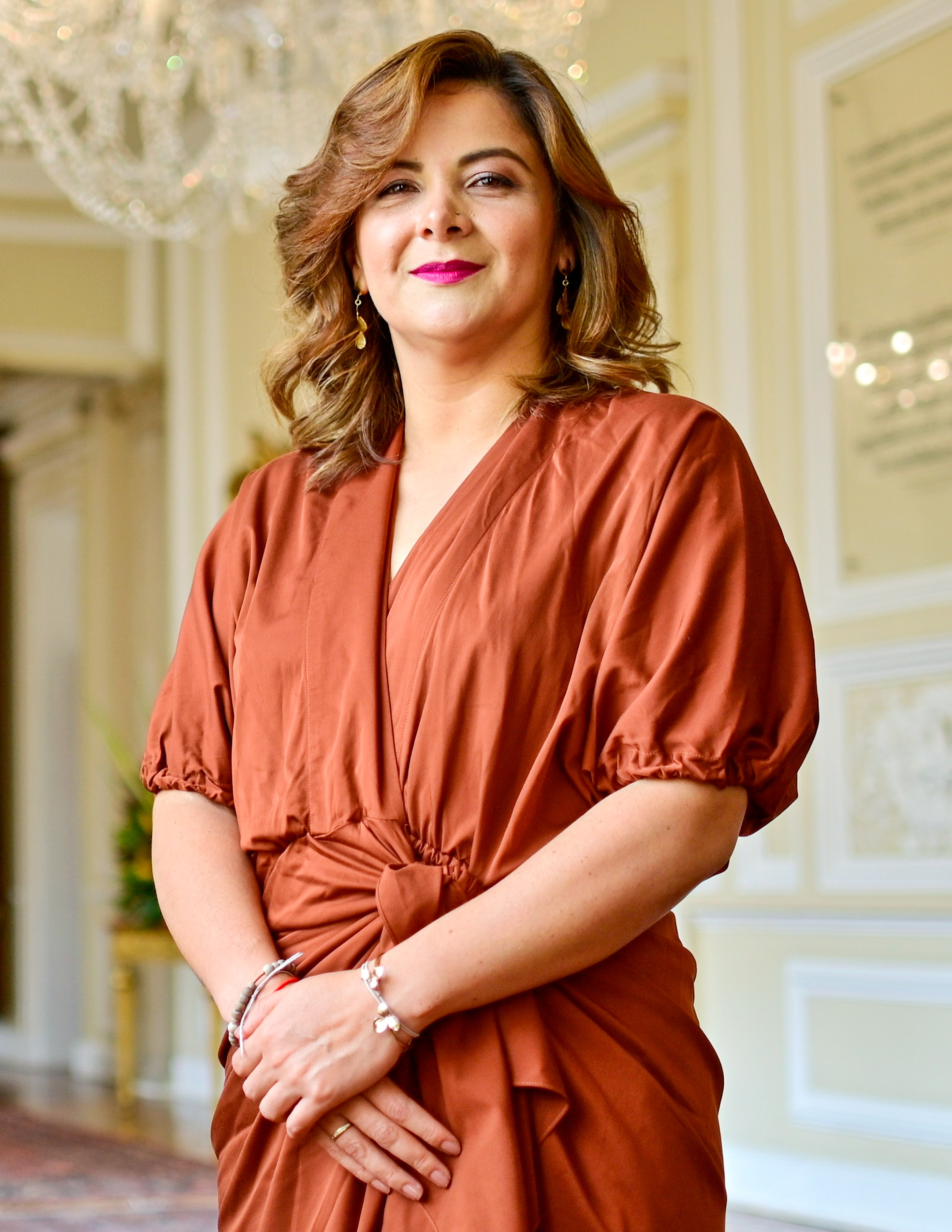
- Official portrait, 2023

Ambassador of Colombia to FAO
- In office February 7, 2025 – August 7, 2026
- President: Gustavo Petro
- Preceded by: Armando Benedetti

Minister of Agriculture and Rural Development
- In office May 1, 2023 – July 7, 2024
- President: Gustavo Petro
- Preceded by: Cecilia López
- Succeeded by: Martha Carvajalino

Personal details
- Born: Jhenifer María Sindei Mojica Flórez; 1984 (age 41–42) Bucaramanga, Santander, Colombia
- Party: Humane Colombia (2021-present)
- Other political affiliations: Historic Pact for Colombia (2021-present)
- Occupation: Politician; human rights defender
- Profession: Lawyer

Jhenifer María Sindei Mojica Flórez (c. 1984) is a Colombian lawyer, human rights defender, and politician who has served as Ambassador of Colombia to the FAO since 2025. Mojica served as Minister of Agriculture and Rural Development, director of Ethnic Affairs for the Land Restitution Unit and deputy director of the Colombian Commission of Jurists.

Born in Bucaramanga, Santander, Mojica holds a law degree from the National University of Colombia. She actively participated in Gustavo Petro 2022 presidential campaign.

== Career ==
Mojica is a lawyer from the National University of Colombia, specializing in procedural law. She has dedicated part of her career to the defense of human rights, particularly the protection of ethical and peasant populations.

Mojica was the founder of the Corporation for the Protection and Development of Rural Territories (PRODETER).

Within her performance as a lawyer, she was deputy director of the Colombian Commission of Jurists (CCJ) and was part of various processes with the Association of Arhuaco Authorities of the Sierra Nevada de Santa Marta and with the Commission for the Clarification of the Truth. Mojica was part of the team that designed the Victims and Land Restitution Law.

Mojica was part of the programmatic team of Gustavo Petro's presidential campaign in 2022, and came to the project because of his closeness to Daniel Rojas, a trusted man of the president who was named president of the SAE and had led the government splicing team.

Political offices
Preceded by Cecilia López	Minister of Agriculture and Rural Development; 2023–2024	Succeeded by Martha Carvajalino
Diplomatic posts
Preceded by Armando Benedetti	Ambassador of Colombia to FAO; 2025-2026	Incumbent
