= Yaneth Giha Tovar =

Colombian economist and politician

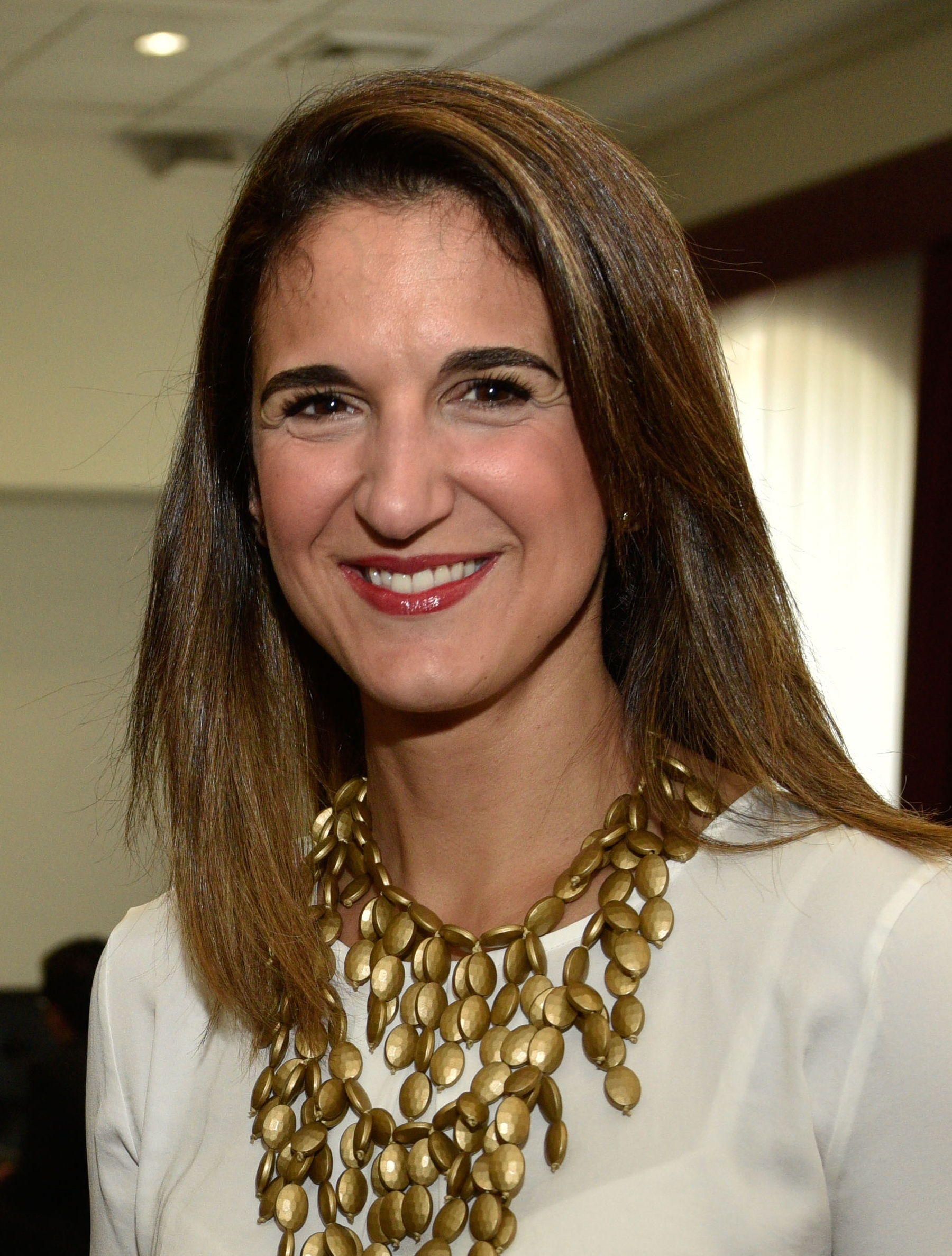

Minister of National Education
- In office 16 November 2016 – 7 August 2018
- President: Juan Manuel Santos
- Preceded by: Gina Parody
- Succeeded by: María Victoria Angulo

Director of the Administrative Department of Science, Technology and Innovation
- In office 20 August 2014 – 15 November 2016
- President: Juan Manuel Santos
- Preceded by: Alicia Ríos Hurtado
- Succeeded by: Alejandro Olaya Dávila

Deputy Minister of Defence
- In office 7 August 2010 – 4 June 2013
- President: Juan Manuel Santos
- Minister: Rodrigo Rivera; Juan Carlos Pinzón

Personal details
- Born: Barranquilla, Atlántico, Colombia
- Party: Social Party of National Unity
- Education: King's College London; University of Los Andes; Pontifical Xavierian University
- Profession: Economist

Yaneth Giha Tovar is an economist and politician who served as the Colombian Minister of Education from 2016 to 2018. Yaneth Giha has also held the position of Director of Colcienas and Deputy Minister of Defence (2010–2013). Yaneth obtained an economics degree from University of Los Andes, and a master's degree from King's College London.
