= Daniel Rojas Medellín =

Minister of National Education of Colombia since 2024

Daniel Rojas
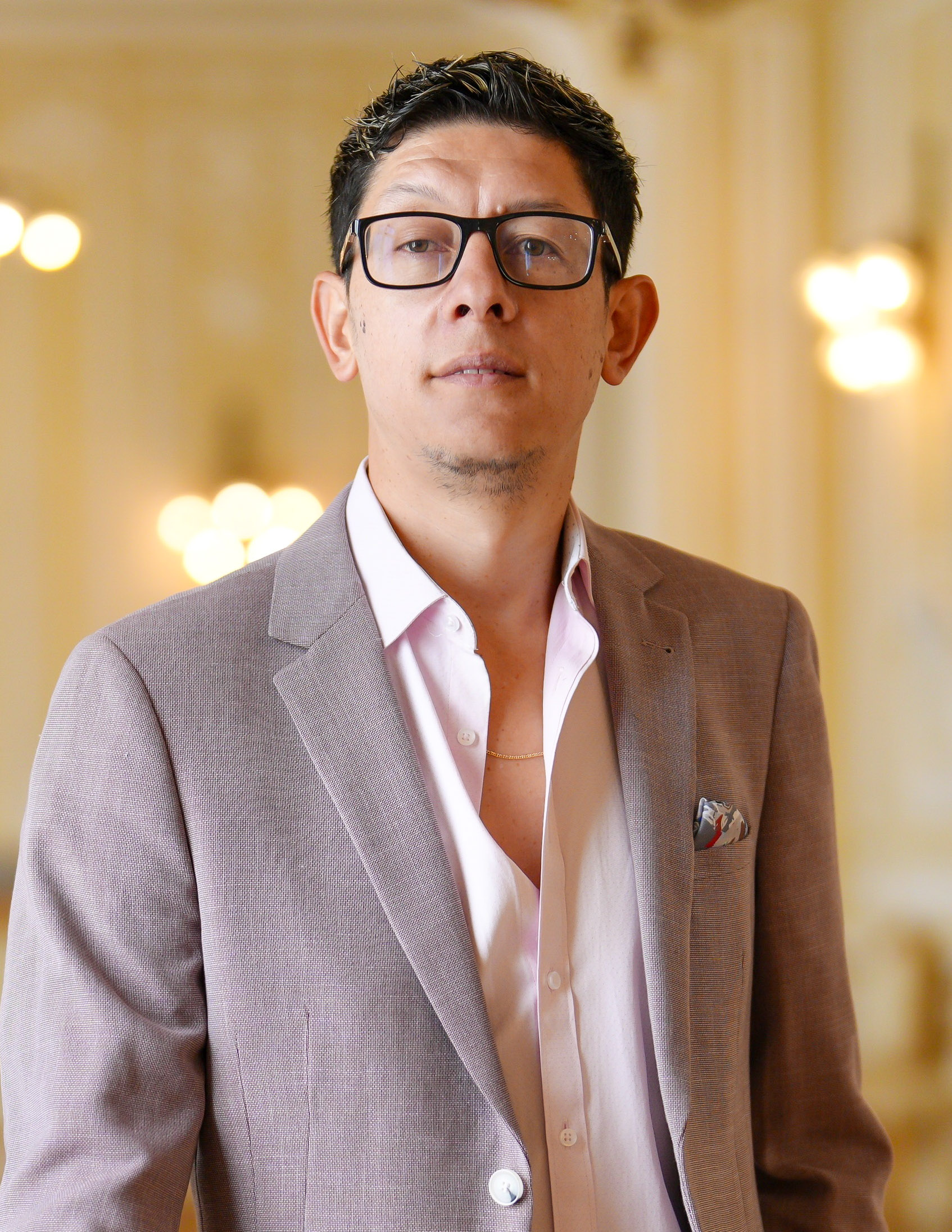
- Official portrait, 2024

Minister of National Education
- In office July 23, 2024 – August 7, 2026
- President: Gustavo Petro
- Preceded by: Aurora Vergara
- Succeeded by: Viviane Morales

Director of the Special Assets Society
- In office September 6, 2022 – July 23, 2024
- President: Gustavo Petro
- Preceded by: Andrés Ávila
- Succeeded by: Amelia Pérez

Personal details
- Born: José Daniel Rojas Medellín; November 14, 1987 (age 38) Bogotá, D.C., Colombia
- Party: Historic Pact (2026-present)
- Other political affiliations: Alternative Democratic Pole (2010–2011); Historic Pact for Colombia (2022-2025); Humane Colombia (2015-2026)
- Education: Saint Thomas Aquinas University (BEc)

José Daniel Rojas Medellín (born November 11, 1987) is a Colombian economist, political activist, and politician who served as Director of the Special Assets Society from 2022 to 2024 and currently as Minister of National Education since July 23, 2024.

Born in Bogotá, D.C., he studied economics at Saint Thomas Aquinas University. Rojas was part of Gustavo Petro 2018 presidential campaign and later joined Petro presidential transition team. In June 2022, Rojas, along with Aurora Vergara (his predecessor), Carolina Corcho, and Mauricio Lizcano, became part of the team for Gustavo Petro's presidential transition in 2022.

Political offices
Preceded by Andrés Ávila	Director of the Special Assets Society; 2022-2024	Succeeded by Amelia Pérez
Preceded by Aurora Vergara	Minister of National Education; 2024–2026	Succeeded by Viviane Morales
Order of precedence
Preceded by Diana Morales as Minister of Commerce, Industry and Tourism	Order of precedence of Colombia as Minister of National Education; July 23, 2024-August 7, 2026	Succeeded by Lena Estrada as Minister of Environment and Sustainable Development
