= María Victoria Angulo =

Colombian politician

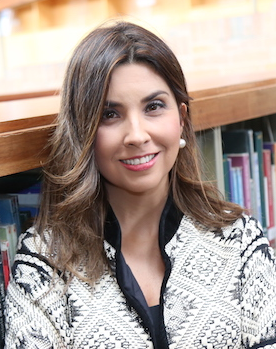
- Angulo in 2019.

Minister of National Education
- In office August 7, 2018 – August 7, 2022
- President: Iván Duque
- Preceded by: Yaneth Giha Tovar
- Succeeded by: Alejandro Gaviria

Personal details
- Born: María Victoria Angulo González; January 28, 1975 (age 51) Ibagué, Tolima, Colombia
- Education: University of the Andes; Pompeu Fabra University

María Victoria Angulo González (born 28 January 1975) is a Colombian politician who served as Minister of National Education from 2018 to 2022.
