= María Fernanda Campo Saavedra =

Colombian politician

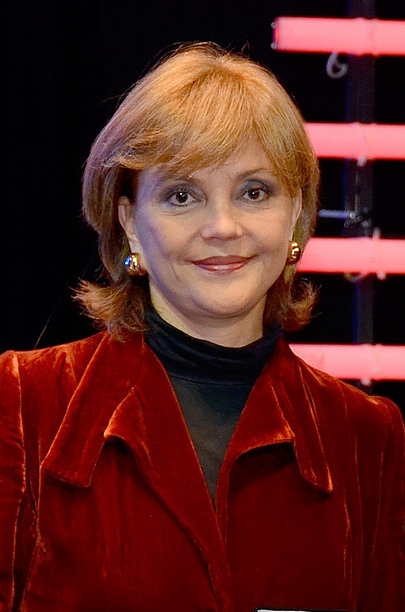
- Minister Campo in 2011.

Minister of National Education of Colombia
- In office 7 August 2010 – August 2014
- President: Juan Manuel Santos Calderón
- Preceded by: Cecilia María Vélez
- Succeeded by: Gina Parody

Personal details
- Born: Buga, Valle del Cauca, Colombia
- Education: University of the Andes (BSc); Kogod School of Business (MFin)
- Profession: Industrial Engineer

María Fernanda Campo Saavedra is the former minister of education of Colombia until August 2014. In 2011 she was appointed Acting Mayor of Bogotá by President Juan Manuel Santos in replacement of Samuel Moreno Rojas, who was stripped of his office following an investigation into the appropriation of city contracts. An industrial engineer, before her nomination she was the President of the Bogotá Chamber of Commerce from 2000 to 2010, the first woman to hold that position, and has also served as Deputy Minister of Foreign Affairs between 1998 and 1999.
