= 2026 Historic Pact presidential primaries =

Selection of the Historic Pact Party nominee

2026 Historic Pact Party presidential primaries
- October 26, 2025
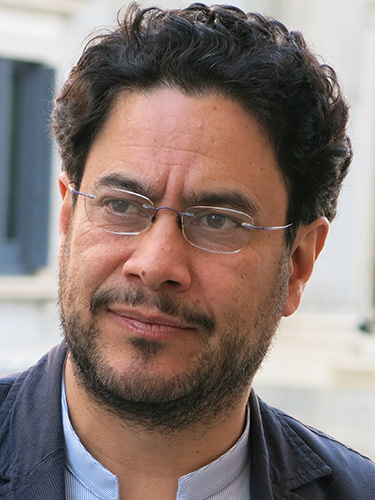

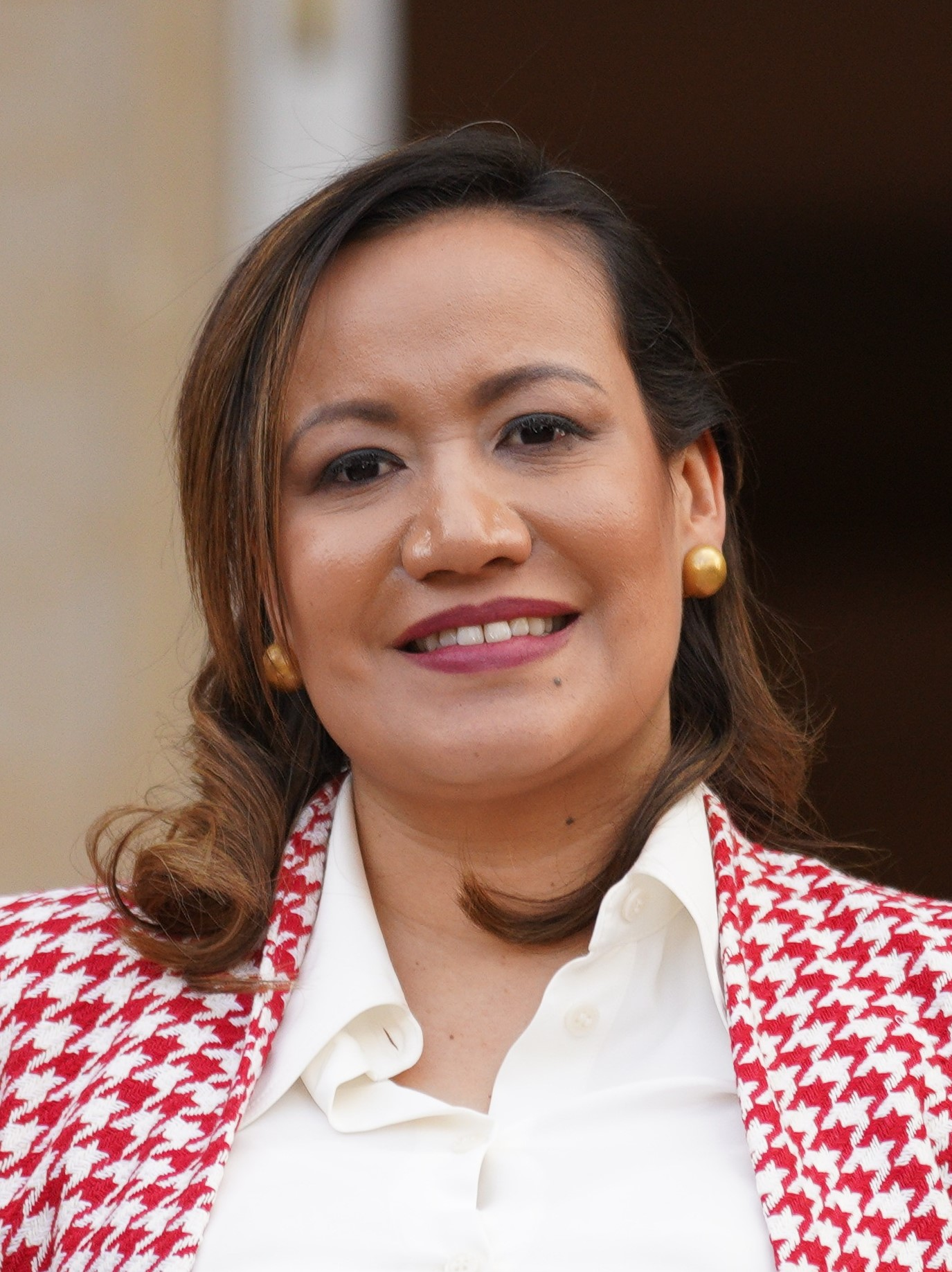

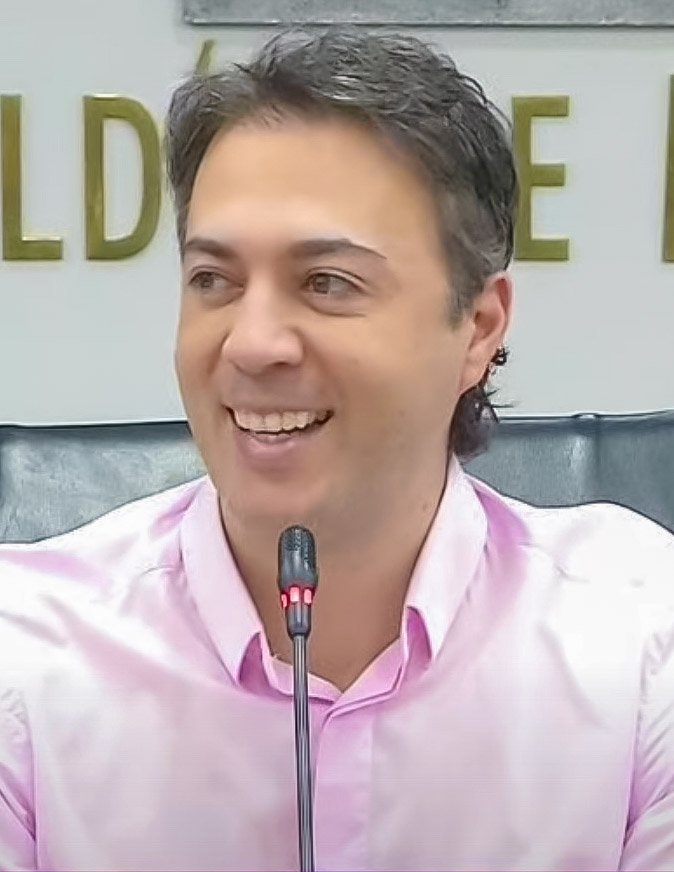
Candidate	Iván Cepeda	Carolina Corcho	Daniel Quintero
Home state	Bogotá, D.C.	Antioquia	Antioquia
Popular vote	1,522,347	670,289	143,174
Percentage	65.7%	28.69%	6.12%
Historic Pact nominee
Iván Cepeda

On 26 October 2025, presidential primaries were organized by the Historic Pact Party to determine the party's presidential candidate for the 2026 Colombian presidential elections. The elections were held nationwide and were organized and managed by the National Civil Registry. Cepeda became the Pact's candidate after obtaining 65.7% of the vote in the primary, defeating Carolina Corcho and Daniel Quintero.

== Candidates and Results ==
The leading candidates in the 2026 Historic Pact presidential primaries held important elected offices or received substantial media coverage.

Candidate	Born	Most recent position	Department	Campaign announced	Results	Ref.
Iván Cepeda	October 24, 1962 (age 63); Bogotá, D.C.	Senator (2014–present)	Bogotá	August 22, 2025	65.7% 1 522 347 votes	
Carolina Corcho	April 13, 1983 (age 42); Medellín, Antioquia	Minister of Health and Social Protection (2022–2023)	Antioquia	July 20, 2025	28.69% 670 289 votes	
Daniel Quintero	July 26, 1980 (age 45); Medellín, Antioquia	Mayor of Medellín (2020–2023)	Antioquia	August 4, 2025	6.12% 143 174 votes	

== Declined candidates ==
Candidate	Born	Most recent position
Gustavo Bolívar	February 22, 1966 (age 59); Girardot, Cundinamarca	General Director of Social Prosperity (2024–2025)
Susana Muhamad	April 21, 1977 (age 48); Bogotá, D.C.	Minister of Environment and Sustainable Development (2022–2025)
María José Pizarro	March 30, 1978 (age 47); Bogotá, D.C.	Senator (2022–present)
Gloria Flórez	January 9, 1962 (age 63); Bucaramanga, Santander	Senator (2022–present)
Alí Bantú	March 24, 1987 (age 38); Popayán, Cauca	Lawyer (2022–present)
Gloria Inés Ramírez	May 8, 1956 (age 69); Filadelfia, Caldas	Minister of Labour (2022–2025)
Francia Marquez	December 1, 1981 (age 43); Suárez, Cauca	Vice President of Colombia (2022–present)

== See also ==
- 2026 Colombian presidential election
