= Is Geography Destiny? =

Book by John Luke Gallup

Is Geography Destiny? Lessons from Latin America
- Author: John Luke Gallup, Alejandro Gaviria, Eduardo Lora, Inter-American Development Bank
- Subject: Geography
- Genre: Economics
- Publisher: Stanford University Press, The World Bank
- Publication date: 2003
- Media type: Print (Paperback)
- Pages: 171 pp
- ISBN: 0-8213-5451-5
- OCLC: 270787572
- Dewey Decimal: 330.98—dc21
- LC Class: HC125.G255 2003

Is Geography Destiny? Lessons from Latin America is a book written by John Luke Gallup, Alejandro Gaviria, Eduardo Lora and published by the Inter-American Development Bank (IDB), which documents an advanced step of the rediscovery of geography by economists initiated by Paul Krugman in the early 1990s, however in another, more deterministic direction.

== Content ==
Inspired by the works of David Landes, Jared Diamond and Jeffrey Sachs, considered as “champions of the rediscovery of geography”, the book is the result of “a series of studies on the influence of geography on Latin American development”. It is part of the Latin American Development Forum Series sponsored by the IDB, by the United Nations Economic Commission for Latin America and the Caribbean and by the World Bank. It is based on nine case studies funded by the IDB’s Latin American Research Network. Suggestions and corrections came from Ricardo Hausmann, chief economist of the IDB.

Gallup, Gaviria and Lora try to discuss how “geography” influences development in Latin America; “geography” is considered as a concept which affects development through physical (productivity of land, rainfall, temperature) and human channels (“location of populations with respect to coasts or urban centers”). For the authors, “'determinism' is a sounder position than skepticism”. The first chapter, an international perspective, is dedicated to countries as “the basic unit of observation” within a horizon of analysis “limited to the past four or five decades”.

In the second chapter, an intranational perspective, the authors analyse “the influence of geography” within Mexico, Bolivia, Colombia, Peru and Brazil, the “Latin American countries with the greatest geographical diversity”. In the last chapter, they propose “policies to overcome the limitations of geography” concerning “regional development”, “research and technology”, “information and market signals”, “urban policies” and “spatial organization”.

== Reviews ==
- Roger Hamilton. Why some countries are poorer than others: Geography can be the explanation as well as the solution. In: IDBAmerica: Magazine of the Inter-American Development Bank. December 2003
- Kenneth Maxwell. Is Geography Destiny? Lessons from Latin America., In: Foreign Affairs, September/October 2003
- Jeffrey T. Bury. Book review: Is geography destiny? Lessons from Latin America. In: Progress in Human Geography December 2004, vol. 28 no. 6 822-823. doi:10.1177/030913250402800613
- Andrew Sluyter. Is Geography Destiny?: Lessons from Latin America by John L. Gallup; Alejandro Gaviria; Eduardo Lora. In: Annals of the Association of American Geographers. Vol. 95, No. 1 (Mar., 2005), pp. 232–236

The book has been translated to Spanish and Portuguese.
