= Aurora Vergara =

Colombian academic and politician (born 1987)

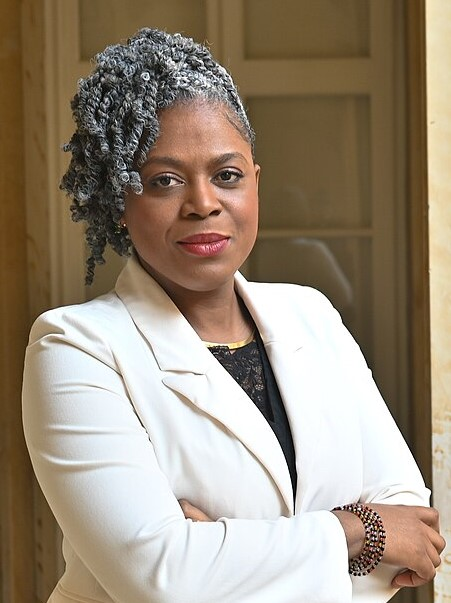
- Official portrait, 2023

Minister of National Education
- In office February 27, 2023 – July 23, 2024
- President: Gustavo Petro
- Preceded by: Alejandro Gaviria
- Succeeded by: Daniel Rojas

Deputy Minister of Higher Education
- In office August 7, 2022 – February 27, 2023
- President: Gustavo Petro
- Preceded by: Maximiliano Gómez
- Succeeded by: Ana Carolina Quijano

Personal details
- Born: Aurora Vergara Figueroa; May 14, 1987 (age 39) Cali, Cauca Valley, Colombia
- Party: Soy Porque Somos (2021-present)
- Education: University of Valle (BSc); University of Massachusetts Amherst (MSoc)
- Occupation: Academic; professor; politician
- Profession: Sociologist

Aurora Vergara Figueroa (born May 14, 1987) is a Colombian sociologist, academic, and professor who served as Minister of National Education from 2023 to 2024 under President Gustavo Petro, Vergara served as Deputy Minister of Higher Education from 2022 to 2023.

Born in Cali, Cauca Valley, she holds a degree in Sociology from the University of Valle and a master's degree in Academic Affairs from the University of Massachusetts Amherst. In 2022, she was a member of Gustavo Petro's presidential transition team and later in August assumed the position of Deputy Minister of Higher Education, a position she would hold until 2023, when she would become Minister of National Education.

== Early life ==
Aurora Vergara Figueroa was born on May 14, 1987, in Cali, Cauca Valley, to Aristóbulo Vergara and María Teresa Figueroa. Her parents moved to Istmina, Chocó, when she was four years old. Her father worked at Emcali, while her mother was a housewife and cleaning lady at the Istmina courthouse.

Vergara studied at the Escuela Normal Superior de las Mercedes, where she finished high school at 16. After completing her studies and faced with a lack of opportunities in Itsmina, she tried to enter the Chocó monastery, but her mother persuaded her to enroll in university. After writing History of Chocó she won the 2003 Andrés Bello Convention Award in history, which allowed her to move to Cali to study at the University of Valle, where she graduated in Social Sciences. Vergara was awarded a scholarship to study at the University of Massachusetts Amherst, where she pursued a master's degree and later a doctorate in Sociology. Later she did postdoctoral study in sociology at Harvard University.

== Deputy Minister of Higher Education (2022-2023) ==
Vergara actively participated in Petro-Márquez presidential campaign, serving on the presidential transition team alongside Mauricio Lizcano, Carolina Corcho, and Daniel Rojas. She was later appointed Deputy Minister of Higher Education by Vice President Francia Márquez, taking office on August 7, 2022, as the right-hand woman to Education Minister Alejandro Gaviria.

== Minister of National Education (2023-2024) ==
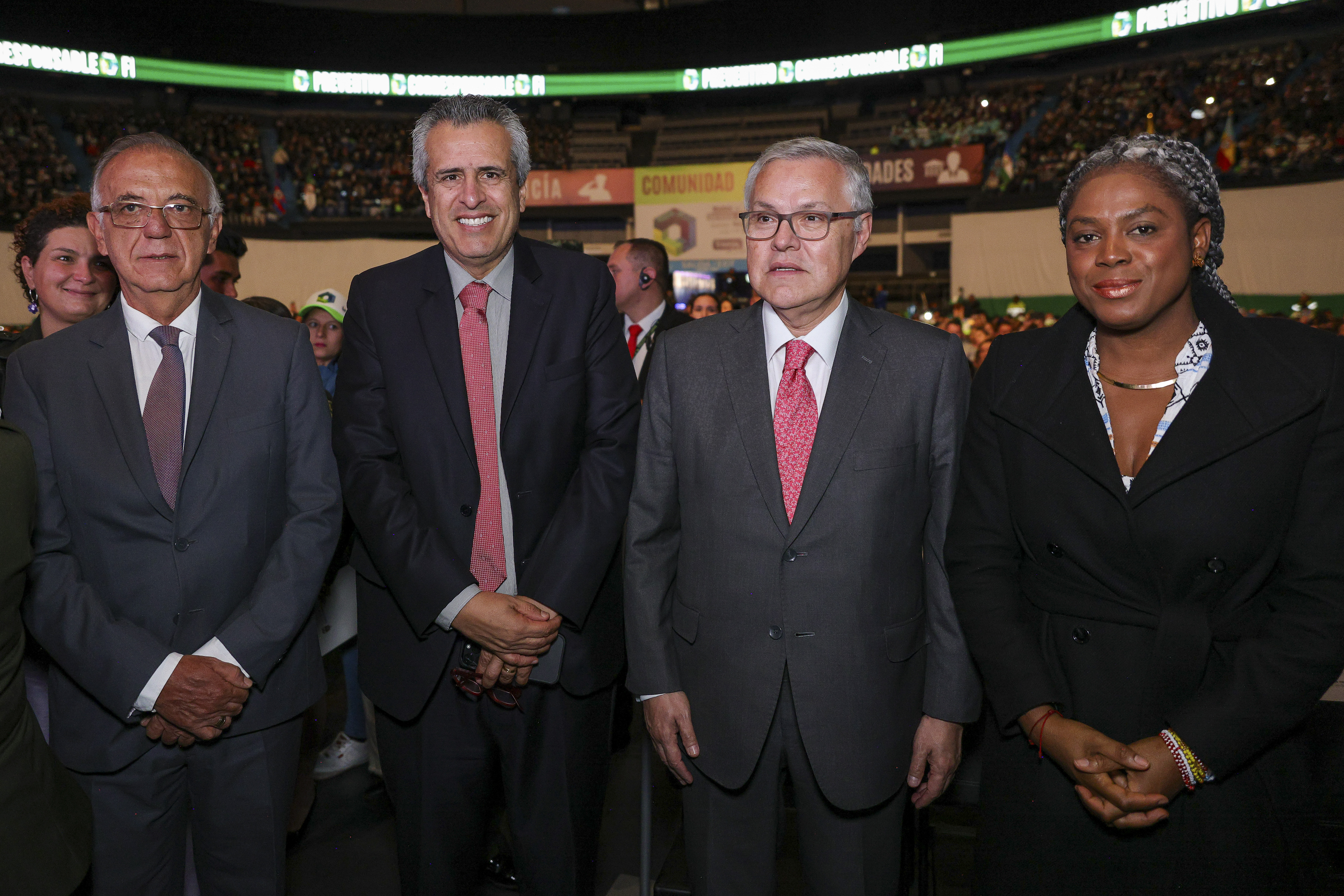
Aurora Vergara with Minister of the Interior, Luis Fernando Velasco, Minister of National Defence, Iván Velásquez and Minister of Justice and Law, Néstor Osuna.

In February 2023, following the resignation of Alejandro Gaviria as Minister of National Education, Vergara was nominated and later confirmed by President Gustavo Petro as the new Minister of National Education. She was the eighth woman and the first Afro-Colombian to hold the position.

Political offices
Preceded by Maximiliano Gómez	Deputy Minister of Higher Education; 2022-2023	Succeeded by Ana Carolina Quijano
Preceded by Alejandro Gaviria	Minister of National Education; 2023–2024	Succeeded by Daniel Rojas
