= Natalia Castañeda Arbelaez =

Colombian painter (born 1982)

- Born: 1982 (age 42–43); Manizales, Colombia
- Other names: Natalia Castañeda–Arbeláez, Natalia Castaneda, Natalia Castañeda, Natalia Arbelaez
- Education: University of the Andes, École des Beaux-Arts, University of Caldas, University of Barcelona (PhD)
- Occupation(s): Painter, draftsperson, video artist, educator, researcher
- Website: www.territorioscomunes.com

Natalia Castañeda Arbelaez (born 1982) is a Colombian painter, draftsperson, video artist, researcher, and educator. She works primarily with large scale landscape paintings of glaciers, featuring topographies. She has taught at the University of the Andes, the El Bosque University, and the University of Barcelona.

== Life and career ==
Castañeda Arbelaez was born in 1982, in Manizales in Andean Region, Colombia. She started making art in childhood. At the age of 17 she moved to Bogotá.

She graduated with a degree in fine arts in 2004, and a degree in multimedia in 2006 from the University of the Andes in Bogotá; and a DNSBA degree (similar to a MA degree) in 2009 from the École Nationale Supérieure des Beaux-Arts in Paris, France. Additionally she took extension courses at the University of Caldas, and received a PhD in 2022 from the University of Barcelona.

Castañeda Arbelaez has regularly explored three of the six remaining ice glacial masses in Colombia, and has been specifically focused on Los Nevados National Natural Park for the last 20 years. In her paintings she documents the land changes due to climate change.

Castañeda Arbelaez has had solo exhibitions at the National Museum of Anthropology (2023), Madrid, Spain; and the Museo Extremeño e Iberoamericano de Arte Contemporáneo (2022), Badajoz, Spain. She was nominated in 2023 for the Colombian XII Luis Caballero Prize, for her series of painted works, Glacial Bodies: Water Ancestors of a Future Extinction (Spanish: Cuerpos Glaciares: ancestros hídricos de una extinción futura), which was part of her doctoral thesis.
