= Jaime Posada Díaz =

Colombian politician (1924–2019)

Jaime Posada Díaz (18 December 1924 – 2 July 2019) was a Colombian politician who served as Ministry of National Education. He died on 2 July 2019 aged 95.
