= John Luke Gallup =

American economist

- Born: January 16, 1962 (age 64)

Academic background
- Education: University of California at Berkeley

Academic work
- Discipline: International Development
- Institutions: Portland State University

John Luke Gallup (born January 16, 1962) is an American economist.

Gallup got his PhD in 1994 at the University of California, Berkeley. From 1996 to 2000 he was a Research Fellow at the Center for International Development at Harvard University. From 2008 to 2009 he was Fulbright Scholar at the Vietnam University of Commerce in Hanoi. He worked with Jeffrey Sachs and Andrew Mellinger on the issue of geography.

== Publications ==
- Far-Flung Europe: What is the Economic Impact of Geography? European Union Committee of Regions for The Macroeconomic Situation of the Outermost Regions Conference, 2006.
- The Wage Labor Market and Inequality in Vietnam in the 1990s. In: Paul Glewwe, David Dollar and Nisha Agrawal (editors). Economic Growth and Household Welfare: Policy Lessons from Vietnam. Washington, D.C.: The World Bank, 2004.
- With Alejandro Gaviria and Eduardo Lora. Is Geography Destiny? Lessons from Latin America. Palo Alto: Stanford University Press, 2003. ISBN 0-8213-5451-5
- With Jeffrey D. Sachs. The Economic Burden of Malaria. In: American Journal of Tropical Medicine and Hygiene 64(1–2), pp. 85, 96, 2001.
- With Jeffrey D. Sachs and Andrew Mellinger. The Geography of Poverty and Wealth. In: Scientific American 284, pp. 62–67, March 2001.
- With Jeffrey D. Sachs. Agriculture, Climate, and Technology: Why are the Tropics Falling Behind? In: American Journal of Agricultural Economics. 82(3), pp. 731–37, 2000.
- Geography and Socioeconomic Development in Latin America and the Caribbean. Chapter 3 of Economic and Social Progress in Latin America, 1999–2000 Report. Washington, D.C.: Inter-American Development Bank, 2000.
- With Andrew Mellinger and Jeffrey D. Sachs. Climate, Coastal Proximity, and Development. In: Gordon L. Clark, Maryann P. Feldman and Meric S. Gertler (editors). The Oxford Handbook of Economic Geography. pp. 169–94, 2000.
- Update to Formatting Regression Output. In: Stata Technical Bulletin 58, pp. 9–13, 2000.
- With Jeffrey D. Sachs and Andrew Mellinger. Geography and Economic Development. In: Boris Pleskovic and Joseph E. Stiglitz (editors). World Bank Annual Conference on Development Economics 1998. Washington, DC: The World Bank, pp. 127–78, 1999. Reprinted In: International Regional Science Review. 22(2), pp. 179–232, 1999.
- With Jeffrey D. Sachs. Health and Wealth: How Geography Influences Socioeconomic Development. In: DRCLAS News, Fall 1999, pp. 7–10.
- Revision of Outreg. In: Stata Technical Bulletin 49, p. 25, 1998.
- With Steve Radelet and Andrew Warner. Economic Growth and the Income of the Poor. CAER Discussion Paper 36, Harvard Institute for International Development, 1998.
- Agricultural Productivity and Geography. American Economics Association Meetings, Chicago 1998.
- Poverty and the Demographic Transition. Conference on Economic Aspects of Demographic Transition: The Experience of Asian Pacific Countries, Taipei, June 19–20, 1998.
- Formatting Regression Output for Published Tables. In: Stata Technical Bulletin 46, pp. 28–30, 1998.
- The Economic Value of Children in Vietnam. Association of Asian Studies Meetings, Washington DC, 1998.
- With Joel E. Cohen, Christopher Small, Andrew Mellinger and Jeffrey D. Sachs. Estimates of Coastal Populations. In: Science Vol. 278, No. 5341, pp. 1211–212.
- With David Bloom. Environment, Poverty, and Population. Background paper for the Asian Development Bank's Emerging Asia: Changes and Challenges, 1997.
- Ethnicity and Earnings in Malaysia. HIID Development Discussion Paper No. 593, 1997.
- Theories of Migration. HIID Development Discussion Paper No.569, 1997
- Migration in Malaysia: Heterogeneity and Persistence. Institutes of Economics and Sociology, Hanoi, 1996
- Heterogeneity, Persistence and Ethnicity: Internal Migration and Labor Markets in Malaysia. PhD thesis, Department of Economics, University of California at Berkeley, 1994.
- With Landis MacKellar. TM2: An Economic-Demographic Simulation Model. World Employment Program Working Paper, International Labor Office, 1993.
- The Effect of Cohort Size on Wages in Brazil. Population Association of America Meeting 1992, Toronto.
