= Carolina Corcho =

Colombian psychiatrist and politician (born 1983)

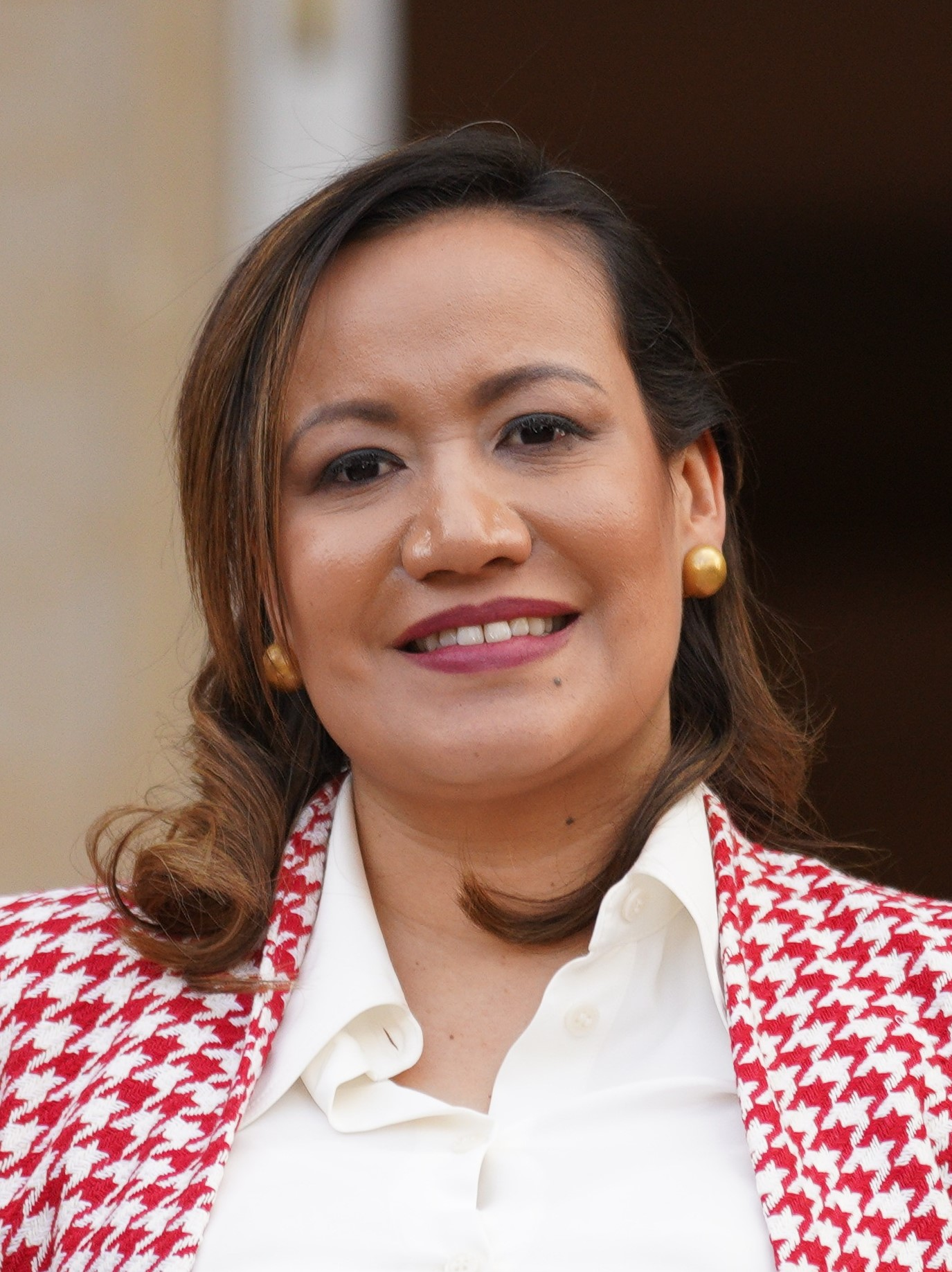
- Official portrait, 2022

Senator of Colombia
- Incumbent
- Assumed office 20 July 2026

Minister of Health and Social Protection
- In office 7 August 2022 – 26 April 2023
- President: Gustavo Petro
- Preceded by: Fernando Ruiz
- Succeeded by: Guillermo Alfonso Jaramillo

Personal details
- Born: Diana Carolina Corcho Mejía; 13 April 1983 (age 43) Medellín, Antioquia, Colombia
- Party: Historic Pact (2025–present)
- Other political affiliations: Liberal (2007–2010); Humane Colombia (2022–2025)
- Education: University of Antioquia (BSc); National University of Colombia (BSc); Pontifical Bolivarian University (MS)
- Occupation: Politician

Diana Carolina Corcho Mejía (born 13 April 1983) is a Colombian political scientist, psychiatrist, physician, professor, and politician who has served as a Senator of Colombia since 2026. A member of the Historic Pact, Corcho served as Minister of health and social protection from 2022 to 2023 under President Gustavo Petro.

Born in Medellín, Antioquia, she studied psychiatry at the University of Antioquia. She later earned a master's degree in psychiatry from the Pontifical Bolivarian University. She worked on Gustavo Petro 2022 presidential campaign. After the 2022 elections, she joined the transition team and was later appointed Minister of Health by President-elect Gustavo Petro. She was the second woman to hold the position after Beatriz Londoño in 2012.

In 2025, she would be part of the primary election organized by the Historic Pact, where she would obtain the second best vote, which made her the head of the list for the senate in the 2026 legislative elections.

== Early life ==
Diana Carolina Corcho Mejía was born on Medellín, Antioquia on April 13, 1983, to Professor Freddy Hernán Corcho and politician Amparo Mejía. Her father was a member of the Antioquia Departmental Assembly. Her mother is an engineer and served as Mayor of Zaragoza, Antioquia.

She studied medicine at the University of Antioquia. She studied psychiatry at the National University of Colombia and later earned a master's degree in political science from the Pontifical Bolivarian University.

== Activism and political career ==
Corcho's activism began in 2013 while serving as president of the national association of interns and residents. Her political activism included efforts to save the San Juan de Dios Hospital in Medellín by invoking the statutory health law. Corcho was a staunch opponent of the health reform proposed by Minister Alejandro Gaviria.

Following the media attention her activism received, Corcho gained notoriety, attracting the attention of Bogotá's mayor, Gustavo Petro, who later appointed her Social Secretary at the Bogotá Health Secretariat, a position she held from 2014 to 2016. She subsequently served as president of the Southern Latin American Corporation, responsible for various public policies, including agriculture, the economy, health, and human rights. Later, in 2022, she co-founded the Latin American Progressive Women's Network.

In 2022, after the presidential election, she was appointed as a member of the transition team.

== Notes ==
Political offices
Preceded by Fernando Ruiz	Minister of Health and Social Protection; 2022–2023	Succeeded by Guillermo Jaramillo
