= Jorge Luis Vaca Forero =

Colombian visual artist

Jorge Luis Vaca Forero (born 1985) is a Colombian visual artist. His work explores the creation and construction of historical memory.

== Biography ==
Jorge Luis Vaca Forero was born in Bogota, Colombia in 1985. Vaca Forero completed a Bachelor of Arts with emphasis on Media arts, and a Master of Art history at the University of Los Andes in 2009. In 2015, he travelled to Argentina to pursue a Master of Electronic Arts at the National University of Tres de Febrero. Vaca Forero has contributed as an associated researcher to the Documents of the 20th Century Latin American and Latino Art Project at the International Center for the Arts of the Americas at the Museum of Fine Arts in Houston. He has also been a guest lecturer at the MAMBO – Museum of Modern Art of Bogotá.

He currently lives and works in Bogota.

== Work ==
Vaca Forero's work investigates the concept of memory at different levels. His sources are all types of written and graphical historical documents. From individual testimonials, to official reports, maps and national symbols.

The construction of memory within a society allows us to understand how this element is defined and how the future is built. Thus, within my artistic practice I find it significant and relevant to explore the discourse built around the identity of my country and the ideals of the nation...

His pieces are structured as poetic objects working as visual catalysts of reflection. Máquina para Un Olvido Presente (2013–2015) is an interactive installation where the repetitive sound of printing accompanies a machine displaying a report from the National Center for Historical Memory. The text contains testimonies from victims of Colombian conflict, which are printed on top of each other. The concepts of repetition and accumulation are used to visualize the overwhelming volume of voices, actors and traces of Colombian conflict. Individual stories constitute collective structures, disappearing on top of each other.

In Transposiciones Patrias (2017), a series of transparent plates lay out the deconstructed map of the country from, and in, a historical perspective, figuratively speaking. The plates are placed inside a box on a tripod. The object acts as a metaphor of the map as a form of institutional validation.
