= Gina Parody =

Colombian politician (born 1973)

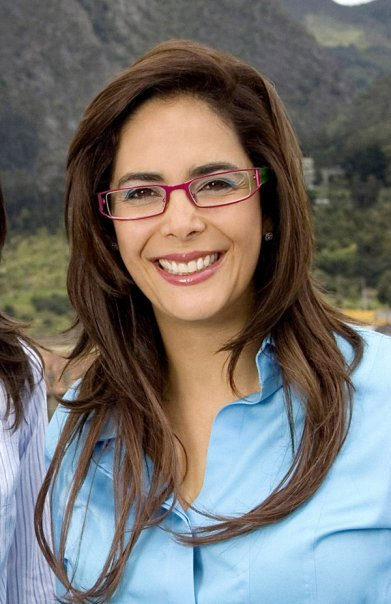
- Parody in 2008

Minister of National Education
- In office 20 August 2014 – 15 November 2016
- President: Juan Manuel Santos
- Preceded by: María Fernanda Campo
- Succeeded by: Yaneth Giha Tovar

Director of the National Learning Service
- In office 6 March 2013 – 20 August 2014
- President: Juan Manuel Santos
- Preceded by: Luis Alfonso Hoyos
- Succeeded by: Alfonso Prada

Senator of Colombia
- In office 20 July 2006 – 19 January 2009

Member of the Chamber of Representatives
- In office 20 July 2002 – 20 July 2006
- Constituency: Capital District

Personal details
- Born: Gina María Parody d'Echeona; 13 November 1973 (age 52) Bogotá, D.C., Colombia
- Party: Independent
- Other political affiliations: Social National Unity (2006-2010); Radical Change (2002-2006)
- Education: Pontifical Xavierian University, Harvard University, Columbia University, The New School
- Profession: Lawyer, Economist, Writer
- Website: www.ginaparody.com

Gina María Parody d'Echeona (born November 13, 1973) is a Colombian politician. Born in Bogotá in 1973, Parody graduated as a lawyer from Pontifical Xavierian University and became a politician. She has served as Director of the National Learning Service (SENA), as a Senator, as member of the Chamber of Representatives of Colombia, and most recently as Minister of Education.

== Career ==
Parody studied law at the Pontifical Xavierian University in Bogotá, obtaining a specialization in conflict resolution. She also studied criminology at the Universidad de Salamanca in Spain and political theory at Columbia University in the United States. She also earned a MPA from the Harvard Kennedy School.

Upon her return to Colombia, Parody worked as adviser to María Isabel Rueda between 1998 and 2000. She later joined the political campaign for the presidency of Álvaro Uribe in the presidential elections of 2002. Uribe suggested her to run as an independent candidate for the Chamber of Representatives of Colombia in representation of Bogota for the legislative elections of 2002. Parody achieved the second highest voting turnout in Bogota, only surpassed by Gustavo Petro.

=== Representative 2002-2006 ===
In congress, Parody was notable for her defense of the politics of President Uribe. She was elected President of the First Commission of the Chamber of Representatives.

=== Senator 2006-2009 ===
In the legislative elections of 2006, Parody decided to join the Social National Unity Party and ran for a seat in the senate. Parody was elected and attempted to nominate herself as candidate for President of the Congress of Colombia and senate, but her party selected Dilian Francisca Toro. She was elected instead as President of the First Commission of the senate. Because of the disorder within the party, Parody organized a dissidence along senate colleagues Marta Lucía Ramírez and Armando Benedetti and chamber representative Nicolás Uribe.

In January 2009, Gina Parody announced that she was resigning her seat in the Colombian Congress. Parody's replacement is Marcos Cortés.

=== 2011 mayoral candidacy ===
In May 2011, Parody announced her candidacy for Mayor of Bogota. Because she ran without the support of any political party, she collected signatures to run as a citizen movement affiliate. She was defeated by Gustavo Petro.

=== 2014 Ministry of Education ===
On August 20, 2014, Parody was appointed as the new Education Minister by President Juan Manuel Santos, replacing María Fernanda Campo Saavedra.

The Secretary of Tourism, Industry and Commerce Cecilia Álvarez-Correa Glen recently made public their personal relationship.

She resigned the Ministry of Education on October 4, 2016, shortly after the referendum of the Colombian peace process was voted as "No". It is believed it had to do with sex-ed schoolbooks called "Ambientes Escolares Libres de Discriminación" (Discrimination-Free School Environments) that were accused of promoting homosexuality and gender ideology. Former president Álvaro Uribe and former Inspector General Alejandro Ordóñez joined the campaign against said schoolbooks, even when the same approach for sex-Ed was used during Uribe's administration.
