= Helena Groot =

Colombian scientist

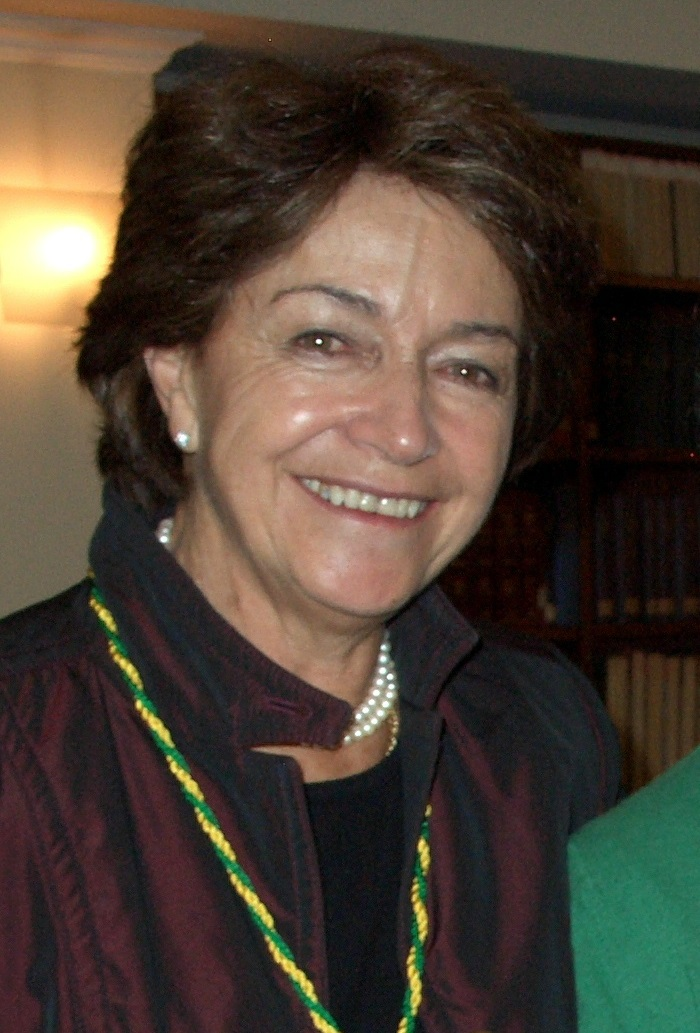
- Born: 1947 (age 78–79); Bogota
- Education: Universidad de los Andes
- Scientific career
- Fields: Genetics, microbiology and cancer research

Helena Groot de Restrepo (Bogotá, 1947) is a Colombian microbiologist and geneticist.

She is a full professor in the Biological Sciences Department and the Medicine School at Universidad de los Andes. Since 1984 she has been the Human Genetics Laboratory director and her research has focused on cancer molecular epidemiology, genetic toxicology and environmental mutagenesis. She is one of the eight women members of the Colombian Academy of Sciences (ACCEFyN).

== Biography ==
Groot finished her school studies in 1965 in the Marymount school. She graduated from a B.Sc. in microbiology at Universidad de los Andes in 1970 and completed a M.Sc. in human genetics in 1984. Currently, Groot is a titular professor in the Biological Sciences department at Universidad de los Andes and she is the Human Genetics Laboratory director.

== Research field ==
The Human Genetics Laboratory has the highest classification (A1) in the Colombian Research Centers and Groups from the Ministry of Science, Technology and Innovation (Colciencias) since 2013.

=== Genetic toxicology ===
In 1984, Groot replaced Maria Victoria Monsalve and became the Human Genetics Laboratory director. Initially she focused on citoxicity and citogenetics, determining the genetic effects of heavy metals, pesticides, solvents and particulates.

=== Population genetics ===
Using mitocondrial and chromosomal DNA, the laboratory has aimed to understand the population dynamics of American colonizers. The lab has also made progress on the detection of population polymorphisms and its influence on DNA repair and cancer.

=== Cell lines ===
Since 1998, the laboratory has established cell culture practices to understand DNA repair phenomena, citotoxicity and to explore cell matrix benefits in biomedical research.

=== Epigenetics ===
The most recent research field in the laboratory is epigenetics effects in complex diseases, such as Von Willebrand disease, haemophilia A and B, diabetes, rheumatoid arthritis, dermatitis, Friedreich's ataxia, oculocutaneous albinism and Multiple sclerosis.

== Awards and honours ==
- Member of the Colombian Academy of Sciences, 2013.
- "Women of Success 2013" Award in the Science and Technology category, 2013.
- Associate member of the Colombian National Academy of Medicine, 2015.

== Publications ==
Groot's most cited publications include:

- HM Cann, C De Toma, L Cazes, MF Legrand, V Morel, L Piouffre. A human genome diversity cell line panel. (2002) Science 296 (5566), 261-262
- MC Bortolini, FM Salzano, MG Thomas, S Stuart, SPK Nasanen, CHD Ba. Y-chromosome evidence for differing ancient demographic histories in the Americas (2003) The American Journal of Human Genetics 73 (3), 524-539
- CM Monroy, AC Cortés, DM Sicard, HG de Restrepo. Citotoxicidad y genotoxicidad en células humanas expuestas in vitro a glifosato. (2005) Biomédica 25 (3), 335-345
- MM Torres, CM Bravi, MC Bortolini, C Duque, S Callegari‐Jacques. A revertant of the major founder Native American haplogroup C common in populations from northern South America. (2006) American Journal of Human Biology 18 (1), 59-65
- H Ossa, J Aquino, R Pereira, A Ibarra, RH Ossa, LA Pérez, JD Granda. Outlining the ancestry landscape of Colombian admixed populations. (2016) PLoS One 11 (10), e0164414
