= Pedro Gómez Valderrama =

Colombian lawyer, writer, and diplomat

Colombia Ambassador to Spain
- In office 7 April 1986 – 28 January 1991
- President: Belisario Betancur Cuartas
- Preceded by: Ramiro Andrade Terán
- Succeeded by: William Jaramillo Gómez

1st Colombia Ambassador to the Soviet Union
- In office 19 January 1968 – 1969
- President: Carlos Lleras Restrepo
- Preceded by: Office created

Colombian Minister of Government
- In office 1 September 1965 – 7 August 1966
- President: Guillermo León Valencia Muñoz
- Preceded by: Alberto Mendoza Hoyos
- Succeeded by: Misael Pastrana Borrero

Colombian Minister of National Education
- In office 7 August 1962 – 1 September 1965
- President: Guillermo León Valencia Muñoz
- Preceded by: Jaime Posada Díaz
- Succeeded by: Daniel Arango Jaramillo

Personal details
- Born: 13 February 1923 Bucaramanga, Santander, Colombia
- Died: 7 May 1992 (aged 69) Bogotá, D.C., Colombia
- Party: Liberal
- Spouse: Beatriz Vila Londoño
- Children: Pedro Alejo Gómez Vila; Carlos Alberto Gómez Vila; Marcela Gómez Vila
- Education: National University of Colombia (LLB)
- Occupation: Writer
- Profession: Lawyer

Pedro Gómez Valderrama (13 February 1923 – 7 May 1992) was a Colombian lawyer, writer, and career diplomat who served as the 1st Ambassador of Colombia to the Soviet Union and as Ambassador of Colombia to Spain.

== Personal life ==
Born on 13 February 1932 in Bucaramanga, Santander, he was the eldest child of Pedro Alejandro Gómez Naranjo and Lucía Valderrama, his younger siblings were: Hernando, José Luis, Carmen Lucía, and Mariá Cecilia. He took after his father, who was a lawyer, politician, writer, and former Governor of Santander. He married Beatriz Vila Londoño with whom he had three children: Pedro Alejandro, Carlos Alberto, and Marcela.

== Selected works ==
- Norma para lo efímero [Normes for the Ephemeral] (Poems) (in Spanish). Bucaramanga: Imprenta Departamental. 1943. OCLC 13682017.
- Valderrama, Pedro Gómez (1993). Muestras del diablo [Devil Signs] (essays) (in Spanish). Bogotá. ISBN 958-9232-26-4.
- Los ojos del burgués: un año en la Unión Soviética [The Eyes of the Bourgeoisie: A Year in the Soviet Union] (non-fiction). Aventura del mundo (in Spanish). Bogotá: Argra. 1971. OCLC 7105629.
- La otra raya del tigre [The Tiger's Other Stripe] (historical novel). La Creación literaria (in Spanish). Bogotá: Siglo Veintiuno Editores. 1977. ISBN 978-958-04-2603-5. OCLC 3391818.
- Los infiernos del Jerarca Brown y otros textos [Hierarch Brown's Hells and Other Stories]. Colección Literaria (in Spanish). Bogotá: Fundación Simón y Lola Guberek. 1984. OCLC 13039670.

== See also ==
- Hernando Téllez
