= Martha Carvajalino =

Colombian government official (born 1983)

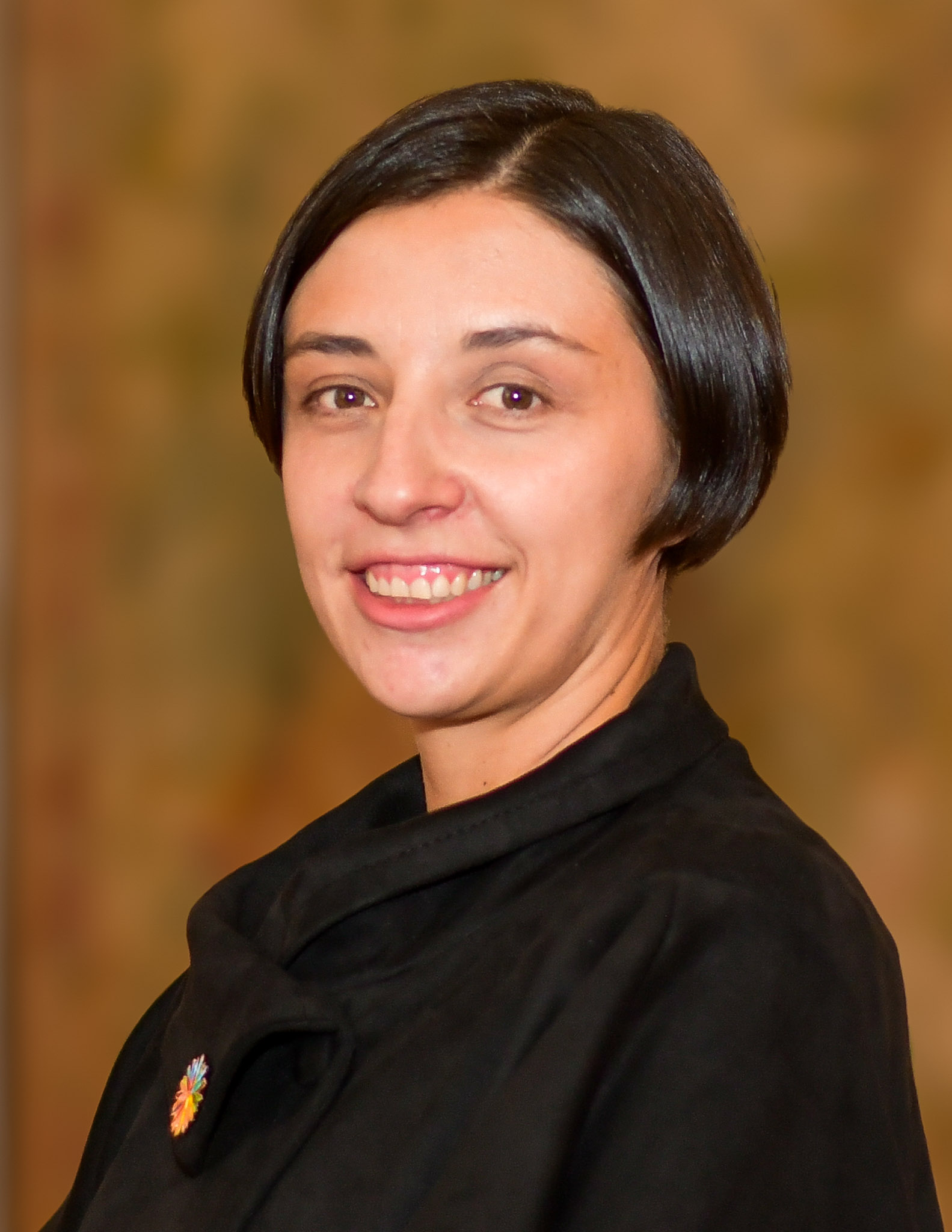
- Carvajalino in 2024

Minister of Agriculture and Rural Development
- In office 8 July 2024 – 7 August 2026
- President: Gustavo Petro
- Preceded by: Jhenifer Mojica
- Succeeded by: Indalecio Dangond

Deputy Minister of Rural Development
- In office 6 June 2023 – 10 January 2024
- President: Gustavo Petro
- Preceded by: Mauricio Cabrera Leal
- Succeeded by: Polivio Rosales

Personal details
- Born: Martha Viviana Carvajalino Villegas; 6 February 1983 (age 43) Bogotá, D.C., Colombia
- Party: Historic Pact (2025-present)
- Other political affiliations: Historic Pact for Colombia (2020-2025); Colombian Communist Party (2015-2025)
- Education: National University of Colombia (BL)

Martha Viviana Carvajalino Villegas (born 6 February 1983) is a Colombian lawyer and politician who served as Minister of Agriculture and Rural Development from 2024 to 2026 under President Gustavo Petro. Previously, she served as Deputy Minister of Rural Development from 2023 to 2024.

Born in Bogotá, D.C., she studied law at the National University of Colombia, where she also earned a master's degree in Constitutional Law.

Political offices
Preceded by Mauricio Cabrera Leal	Deputy Minister of Rural Development; 2023-2024	Succeeded by Polivio Rosales
Preceded by Jhenifer Mojica	Minister of Agriculture and Rural Development; 2024–2026	Succeeded by Indalecio Dangond
