= Gustavo De La Vega =

Colombian entrepreneur, speaker and investor

Gustavo de la Vega
- Born: May 15, 1977 (age 48); Cartagena, Colombia
- Occupations: Entrepreneur; Speaker

Gustavo De La Vega (born May 15, 1977), is a Colombian entrepreneur, investor, and speaker. De La Vega was born in Cartagena, Colombia. He graduated from University of the Andes with a degree in Business Administration. In 2012, De La Vega founded NativApps, a software development and technology services company. He also co-founded Tripple, a platform for innovation management, and CargoApp, a logistics tech company.

In 2015, NativApps, was recognized by ProColombia and the national Ministry for the Information and Communications Technologies as one of the exporting companies with the greatest innovation in the caribbean region in Colombia. In 2018, he was also highly involved in bringing Jumio investments to Colombia, an identity verification company from Silicon Valley. De La Vega has participated as a mentor in important programs such as Endeavor and TEDx Talks.

== Books ==
- De La Vega Alvarez, Gustavo (2014). Instant PhoneGap: Begin your journey of building amazing mobile applications using PhoneGape with the geolocation API. London: Packt Publishing. ISBN 978-1782168690. OCLC 870334833.
