= Jeffrey T. Bury =

American geographer

- Born: January 19, 1970 (age 56); Salt Lake City, Utah, US
- Education: University of Utah; American University; University of Colorado Boulder
- Spouse: Sarah Bury
- Children: Alexander Bury
- Awards: Golden Apple Award
- Scientific career
- Fields: Political Science, International Affairs, Geography
- Workplaces: University of California, Santa Cruz; San Francisco State University

Jeffrey T. Bury (born 1970) is an American geographer and researcher focused on the natural and social transformations in Latin America caused by globalization processes.

== Background ==
Bury grew up in Salt Lake City, Utah, and received a BA in political science from the University of Utah in 1993, and an MA in international affairs from the American University in 1995 (with an early study of carbon sequestration politics). He received his PhD in geography at University of Colorado Boulder in 2002 with a dissertation on The Political Ecology of Transnational Mining Corporations and Livelihood Transformation in Cajamarca Peru, supervised by Anthony Bebbington. From 2003 to 2006 He was assistant professor at San Francisco State University. Since 2006, he has been associate professor at the Department of Environmental Studies at University of California, Santa Cruz.

Bury publishes in English, Spanish and has limited proficiency in Quechuan.

== Scholarly work ==
Bury has been tracing the interaction between mining projects, rural livelihood systems, and environmental change in the Peruvian Andes since the late 1990s. Over this time, the pace of mining has increased, as has local resistance to it. He is also part of a large NSF project, "Hydrologic Transformation and Human Resilience to Climate Change in the Peruvian Andes."

== Awards ==
2014: Golden Apple Award (education) Division of Social Sciences, UCSC.

== Major publications ==
- Bebbington, A. J. and Bury, J. in press 2013. Subterranean Struggles: New Geographies of Extractive Industries in Latin America. University of Texas-Austin Press.
