= Ministry of Social Protection (Colombia) =

Former government ministry of Colombia

- Ministerio de la Protección Social

Ministry overview
- Formed: 27 December 2002
- Preceding agencies: Ministry of Labour and Social Security; Ministry of Health
- Dissolved: 4 May 2011
- Superseding agencies: Ministry of Labour; Ministry of Health and Social Protection
- Headquarters: Carrera 13 No. 32-76; Bogotá, D.C., Colombia
- Annual budget: COP$21,543,445,972,055 (2009); COP$24,347,028,621,394 (2010); COP$24,557,839,917,998 (2011)
- Website: www.minproteccionsocial.gov.co

The Ministry of Social Protection (Spanish: Ministerio de la Protección Social) was a national executive ministry of the Government of Colombia responsible for coordinating and implementing the national policy and social services relating to employment, labour, health and social security; it operated from 2002 to 2012.

Created as part of a larger ministerial reform aimed at reducing the national operating budget, it consolidated the Ministry of Labour and Social Security and the Ministry of Health. It was eventually divided again into the Ministry of Labour and the Ministry of Health and Social Protection.
