= Cecilia María Vélez =

Colombian economist, politician

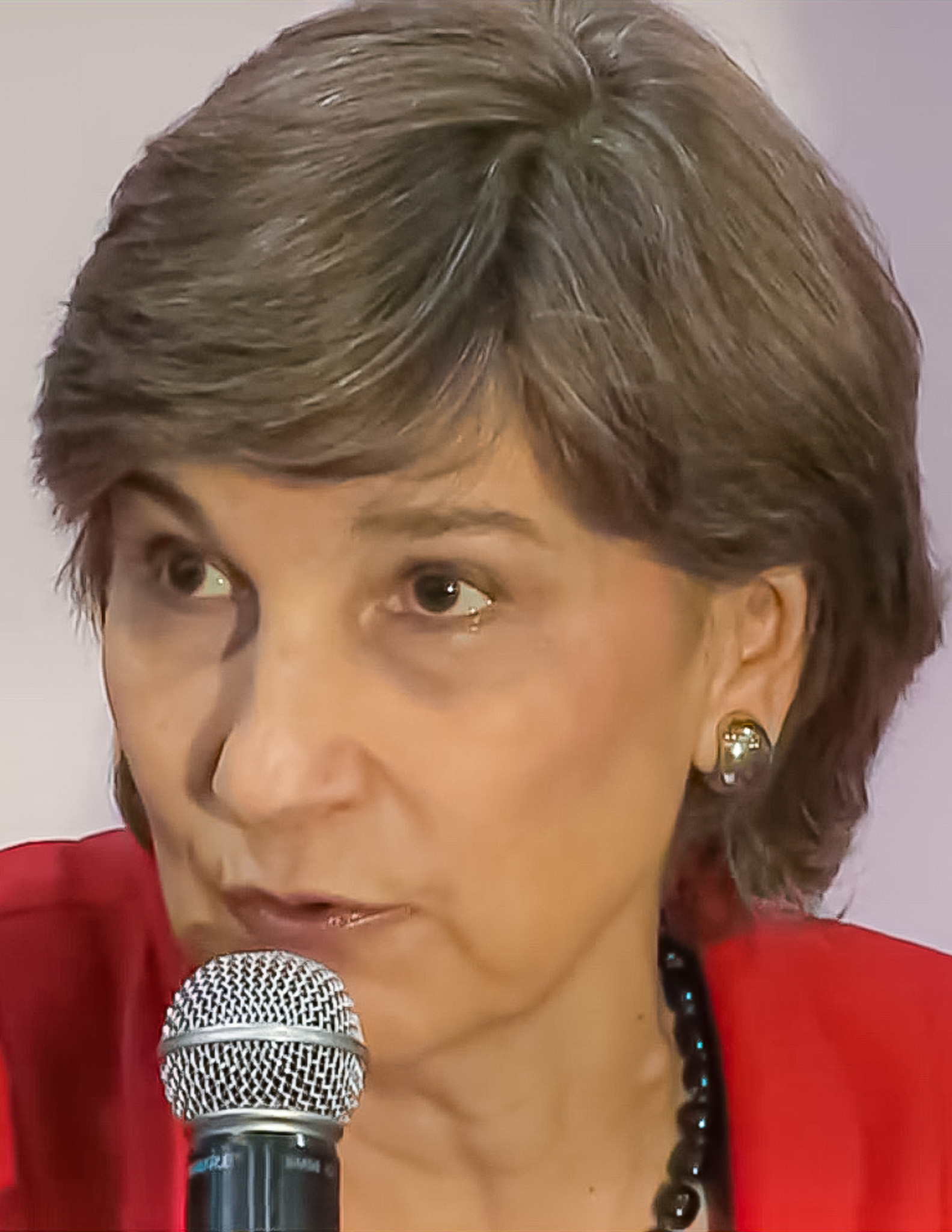

Minister of Education
- In office 2002–2010

Personal details
- Born: 1952 (age 73–74) Frontino, Antioquia, Colombia
- Education: University of Antioquia; Universidad Jorge Tadeo Lozano; Université catholique de Louvain

Cecilia María Vélez White (born 1952) is a Colombian economist, politician and business executive. She served as Colombia's Secretary of Education (from 1998) and Minister of Education from 2002 to 2010. Since 2011, she has been President of Jorge Tadeo Lozano University. In April 2021, she was appointed an independent board member of the Colombian petroleum company Ecopetrol.

== Biography ==
Born in 1952 in Frontino, Antioquia, Cecilia María Vélez White is the daughter of the engineer Juvenal Vélez Correa and his wife the politician Gabriela White de Vélez (1913–1991). She was one of four children. A successful student at school, she studied economics at the University of Antioquia (1972–1976), graduating from the Universidad Jorge Tadeo Lozano in 1977. She went on to earn a master's degree in economics from the University of Louvain in Belgium and completed the Special Program for Urban and Regional Studies of Development Areas at the Massachusetts Institute of Technology.

Vélez embarked on her political career in 1993 when she served at Colombia's National Planning Department. From October 1994, she spent a year as economic advisor at the Embassy of Colombia, London. In 1998, she was appointed Colombia's Secretary of Education and was promoted to Minister of Education in 2002. Her contributions to her country's educational system include extension of basic education coverage, establishment of a library network and development of the concept of quality.

Vélez has been President of the Jorge Tadeo Lozano University since 2011. She has introduced a number of substantial improvements to the university, especially in a greener approach to agriculture as peace is restored in the country. Vélez has also been active in business and banking. She has held executive posts at Colombia's National Bank and has served on several boards of directors. In April 2021, she was appointed an independent member of Ecopetrol's board of directors.
