= Alejandro Gaviria Uribe =

Colombian economist (born 1965)

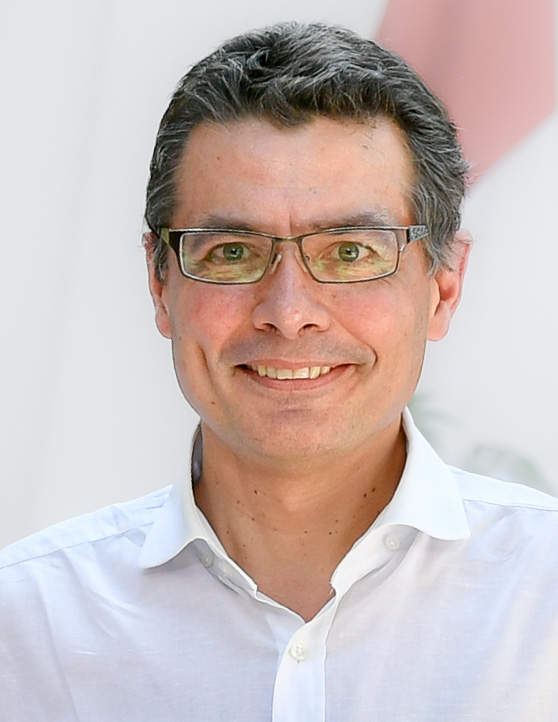

Minister of National Education
- In office 7 August 2022 – 27 February 2023
- President: Gustavo Petro
- Preceded by: María Victoria Angulo
- Succeeded by: Aurora Vergara

Rector of the University of Los Andes
- In office 22 May 2019 – 27 August 2021
- Preceded by: Pablo Navas Sanz
- Succeeded by: Raquel Bernal Salazar

Minister of Health and Social Protection
- In office 3 September 2012 – 7 August 2018
- President: Juan Manuel Santos
- Preceded by: Beatriz Londoño Soto
- Succeeded by: Fernando Ruiz Gomez

Deputy General Director of the National Planning
- In office 7 August 2002 – 6 February 2004
- President: Álvaro Uribe
- Preceded by: Tomás González Estrada
- Succeeded by: José Leibovich Goldenberg

Personal details
- Born: Alejandro Gaviria Uribe; 25 June 1965 (age 61) Santiago, Chile
- Spouse: Carolina Soto Losada
- Education: Antioquia School of Engineering (BS); University of the Andes (MEcon); University of California, San Diego (PhD)

Alejandro Gaviria Uribe (born 25 June 1965) is a Colombian economist and engineer, serving as the Minister of National Education of Colombia since 7 August 2022, replacing María Victoria Angulo. He also served as Minister of Health and Social Protection of Colombia from 2012 to 2018. He is the former Rector of the University of Los Andes (Colombia), where he served from 2019 to August 2021. He was Dean of the School of Economics at the University of los Andes in 2006, until his appointment as Minister in 2012. Prior to his academic career, Gaviria served as Deputy Director of the National Planning Department of Colombia, as well as Deputy Director of the Foundation for the Higher Education and Development (Fedesarrollo), a private non-profit policy research centre, and as a Researcher at the Inter-American Development Bank. He is a published author of several books and scientific articles in peer-reviewed journals.

== Career ==
=== Minister of Health and Social Protection ===
On 30 August 2012, President Juan Manuel Santos Calderón announced the designation of Gaviria as Minister of Health and Social Protection of Colombia. Gaviria was sworn in on 3 September 2012 succeeding Beatriz Londoño Soto. On 7 August 2018, he was succeeded by the medical doctor and surgeon Juan Pablo Uribe Restrepo under the government of president Iván Duque Márquez.

== Personal life ==
Gaviria was born in 1966 in Santiago, Chile, to Juan Felipe Gaviria Gutiérrez and Cecilia Uribe Flórez. He is married to Carolina Soto Losada, former High Presidential Counsellor for Government, Private Sector and Competitiveness of Colombia. He has two children, Mariana Gaviria and Tomas Gaviria. On 6 September 2017, it was announced he was being treated for non-Hodgkin lymphoma. Gaviria identifies as an atheist.

== Selected works ==
- Londoño de la Cuesta, Juan Luis; Gaviria Uribe, Alejandro; Guerrero, Rodrigo, eds. (2000). Asalto al Desarrollo: Violencia en América Latina (in Spanish). Washington, D.C.: Inter-American Development Bank. ISBN 9781886938861. OCLC 45762414.
- Gaviria Uribe, Alejandro; Zapata Giraldo, Juan Gonzalo; González Romero, Adriana (2002). Petróleo y Región: El Caso de Casanare. Cuadernos de Fedesarrollo, 8 (in Spanish). Bogotá: Fedesarrollo. ISBN 9789586823630. OCLC 318238438.
- Gaviria Uribe, Alejandro (2002). Los Que Suben y Los Que Bajan: Educación y Movilidad Social en Colombia. Economía colombiana (in Spanish). Bogotá: Alfaomega Colombiana. ISBN 9789586823920. OCLC 53006782.
- Behrman, Jere R; Gaviria Uribe, Alejandro; Székely, Miguel, eds. (2003). Who's In and Who's Out: Social Exclusion in Latin America. Washington, D.C.: Inter-American Development Bank. ISBN 9781931003421. OCLC 60704979.
- Gallup, John Luke; Gaviria Uribe, Alejandro; Lora, Eduardo (2003). Is Geography Destiny? Lessons from Latin America. Palo Alto, CA: Stanford University Press. ISBN 9780585479576. OCLC 270787572.
- Gaviria Uribe, Alejandro (2005). Del Romanticismo al Realismo Social y Otros Ensayos. Colección Vitral (in Spanish). Bogotá: Grupo Editorial Norma. ISBN 9789580488408. OCLC 69953037.
- Gaviria Uribe, Alejandro (2008). Uribenomics y Otras Paradojas. Colección Vitral (in Spanish). Bogotá: Grupo Editorial Norma. ISBN 9789584507624. OCLC 263313360.
- Gaviria Uribe, Alejandro; Mejía Londoño, Daniel, eds. (2011). Políticas Antidroga en Colombia: Éxitos, Fracasos y Extravíos (in Spanish). Bogotá: University of the Andes. ISBN 9789586956024. OCLC 739120420.
- Gaviria Uribe, Alejandro (2016). Alguien tiene que llevar la contraria. Ariel.
- Gaviria Uribe, Alejandro (2018). Hoy es siempre todavía. Ariel.
- Gaviria Uribe, Alejandro (2019). Siquiera tenemos las palabras. Ariel.
- Gaviria Uribe, Alejandro (2020). Otro fin del mundo es posible. Ariel.
- Gaviria Uribe, Alejandro (2021). En defensa del humanismo. Ariel.
- Gaviria Uribe, Alejandro (2023). La explosión controlada: La encrucijada del líder que prometió el cambio. DEBATE
