= Beatriz Londoño =

Colombian physician and administrative politician

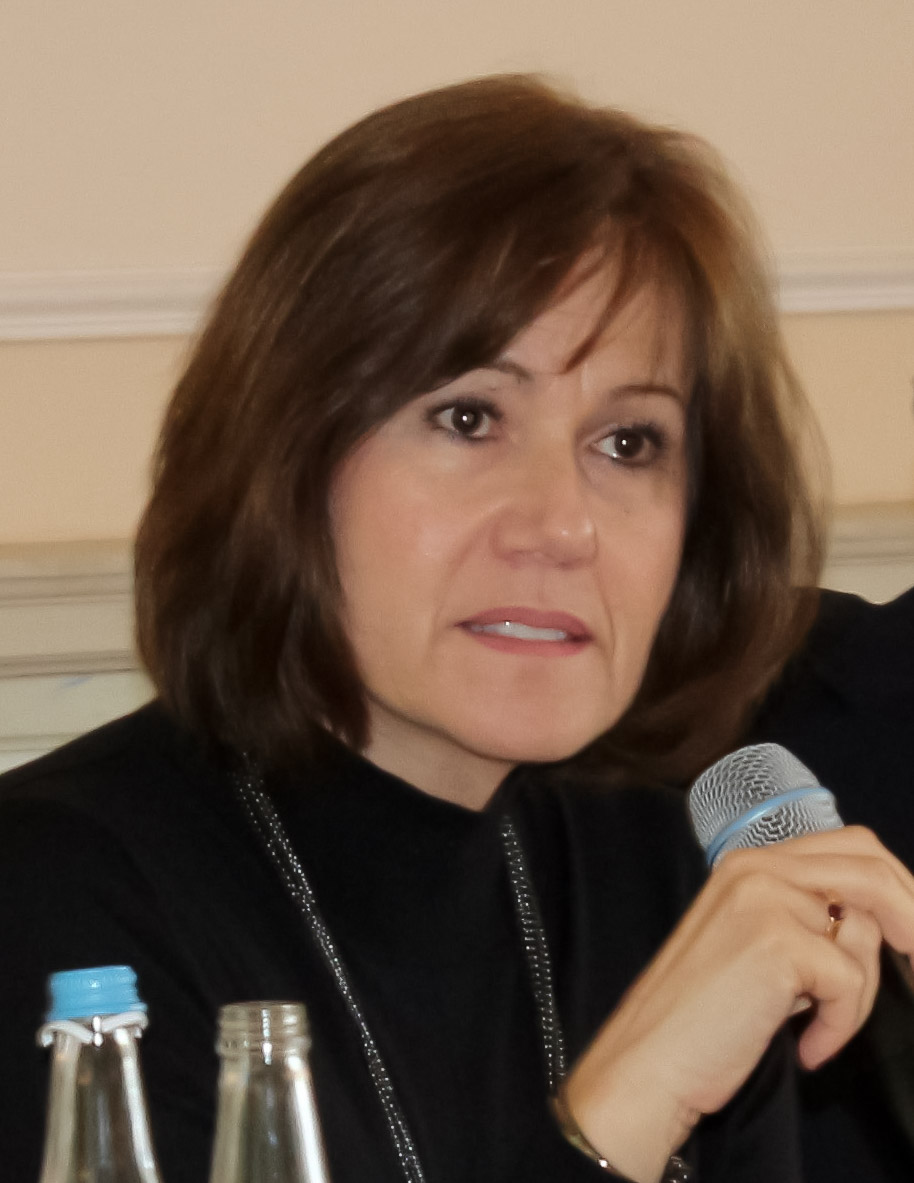

Colombia Ambassador to Switzerland
- In office 26 March 2013 – April 2015
- President: Juan Manuel Santos Calderón
- Preceded by: Claudia Turbay Quintero
- Succeeded by: Julián Jaramillo Escobar

2nd Minister of Health and Social Protection of Colombia
- In office 24 January 2011 – 3 September 2012
- President: Juan Manuel Santos Calderón
- Preceded by: Mauricio Santa María Salamanca
- Succeeded by: Alejandro Gaviria Uribe

Personal details
- Born: Beatriz Londoño Soto; 1959 (age 66–67) Medellín
- Spouse: Alonso Bravo Escobar
- Children: María Bravo Londoño
- Education: Pontifical Bolivarian University (MBBS, 1982); Harvard School of Public Health (MPH, 1990)
- Profession: Physician

Beatriz Londoño Soto (born 1959) is a Colombian physician and administrative politician who previously served as the Ambassador of Colombia to Switzerland and as the 2nd Minister of Health and Social Protection of Colombia in the Administration of President Juan Manuel Santos Calderón. She had previously served as Deputy Minister of Health and Welfare under the administration of her predecessor from 2010 to 2011, and as Director of the Colombian Family Welfare Institute from 2002 to 2006.

== Ambassadorship ==
On 19 March 2013 President Juan Manuel Santos Calderón appointed Londoño Ambassador of Colombia to Switzerland. She presented her Letters of Credence to the President of the Swiss Confederation, Ueli Maurer, and the Federal Chancellor of Switzerland, Corina Casanova, at a ceremony at the Federal Palace on 26 March 2013.
