= Ministry of Health and Social Protection (Colombia) =

Ministry of the Government of Colombia

- Ministerio de Salud y Protección Social

Ministry overview
- Formed: 4 May 2011
- Preceding Ministry: Ministry of Social Protection
- Jurisdiction: Colombia
- Headquarters: Carrera 13 No. 32-76 Bogotá, Colombia; 04°37′11.92″N 74°04′05.69″W
- Annual budget: COP$10,484,950,978,716 (2013); COP$11,174,046,764,741 (2014)
- Ministry executive: Minister
- Website: www.minsalud.gov.co

The Ministry of Health and Social Protection (Spanish: Ministerio de Salud y de Protección Social, MinSalud) is one of the nineteen national executive ministries of the Government of Colombia, and is responsible for coordinating and implementing the national policy and social services relating to health and social security.

== History ==
Upon assuming the Presidency of the Republic in his first term (2002–2006), President Álvaro Uribe Vélez decided to merge the Ministries of Health and Labor into the Ministry of Social Protection.

The two ministries that made up the Ministry of Social Protection were the Ministry of Labor, created by Law 96 of 1938, and the Ministry of Health, created under the name of Ministry of Hygiene by Law 27 of 1946 and later called the Ministry of Health.

With the passage of Law 1444 of 2011, the Ministry of Social Protection was split into two; according to article 7 of said law, the Ministry of Social Protection was transformed into the Ministry of Labor, and according to article 9 of the same law, the Ministry of Health and Social Protection was created.

== Location ==
Previously, when the Ministry of Social Protection had not been separated, it was located at Carrera 13 No. 32-76 in the city of Bogotá . Currently the Ministry of Health is located at the same address, while the Ministry of Labor has its headquarters at Carrera 14 No. 99-33.

== List of ministers health and social protection ==
Below is a table of all past ministers, the time in which they served and the presidents who appointed them into office. Noted that the head of Ministry of Social Protection prior to 2011 is also listed:

Name	Assumed office	Left office	President(s) served under
Juan Luis Londoño	August 7, 2003	February 6, 2003	Álvaro Uribe
Diego Palacio Betancourt	February 10, 2003	August 7, 2010	Álvaro Uribe
Mauricio Santa María	August 7, 2010	January 24, 2012	Juan Manuel Santos
Beatriz Londoño Soto	January 24, 2012	September 3, 2012	Juan Manuel Santos
Alejandro Gaviria Uribe	September 3, 2012	August 7, 2018	Juan Manuel Santos
Juan Pablo Uribe	August 7, 2018	February 7, 2020	Iván Duque
Fernando Ruiz Gómez	March 3, 2020	August 7, 2022	Iván Duque
Carolina Corcho	August 7, 2022	January 5, 2023	Gustavo Petro
Guillermo Jaramillo	April 26, 2023	August 7, 2026	Gustavo Petro
