= Ministry of National Education (Colombia) =

Government ministry of Colombia

- Ministerio de Educación Nacional

Ministry overview
- Formed: 1 January 1928
- Headquarters: Calle 43 № 57-14 Bogotá, D.C., Colombia; 04°38′47.36″N 74°05′40.51″W
- Annual budget: COP$23,092,798,432,087 (2012); COP$24,899,811,728,484 (2013); COP$26,932,267,932,578 (2014)
- Ministry executive: Minister
- Child agencies: INCI; INSOR; ITC; Intenalco; ITFIP; INFOTEP-San Andres; INFOTEP-San Juan del Cesar; Colcultura (through 1997)
- Website: www.mineducacion.gov.co

The Ministry of National Education (Spanish: Ministerio de Educación Nacional) is the national executive ministry of the Government of Colombia responsible for overseeing the instruction and education of the Colombian people, similar to education ministries in other countries.

== List of ministers ==
Order	Period	Minister of National Education
1st	1928-1930	José Vicente Huertas
2nd	1930-1930	Elíseo Arango Ramos
3rd	1930-1931	Abel Francisco Carbonell Vergara
4th	1931-1933	Julio Carrizosa Valenzuela
5th	1933-1934	Pedro Maria Carreño Mallarino
6th	1934-1934	Jaime Jaramillo Arango
7th	1934-1934	Carlos Lozano y Lozano
8th	1934-1935	Luis López de Mesa Gómez
9th	1935-1935	Calixto Torres Umaña
10th	1935-1937	Darío Echandía Olaya
11th	1937-1937	Alberto Lleras Camargo
12th	1937-1937	Tulio Enrique Tascón Quintero
13th	1937-1937	Alejandro López Restrepo
14th	1937-1938	José Joaquín Castro Martínez
15th	1938-1940	Alfonso Araújo Gaviria
16th	1940-1941	Jorge Eliécer Gaitán Ayala
17th	1941-1941	Guillermo Nannetti Concha
18th	1941-1942	Juan Lozano y Lozano
19th	1942-1942	Germán Arciniegas Angueyra
20th	1942-1942	Jorge Zalamea Borda
21st	1942-1943	Absalón Fernández de Soto
22nd	1943-1943	Rafael Parga Cortés
23rd	1943-1943	Carlos Lozano y Lozano
24th	1943-1943	Carlos Arango Vélez
25th	1943-1945	Antonio Rocha Alvira
26th	1945-1945	Rafael Escallón
27th	1945-1945	Antonio Rocha Alvira
28th	1945-1946	Germán Arciniegas Angueyra
29th	1946-1946	Mario Carvajal Borrero
30th	1946-1947	Miguel Jiménez López
31st	1947-1947	Eduardo Zuleta Ángel
32nd	1947-1948	Joaquín Estrada Monsalve
33rd	1948-1948	Elíseo Arango Ramos
34th	1948-1949	Fabio Lozano y Lozano
35th	1949-1949	Elíseo Arango Ramos
36th	1949-1949	Eleuterio Serna Ramírez
37th	1949-1950	Manuel Mosquera Garcés
38th	1950-1951	Antonio Álvarez Restrepo
39th	1951-1952	Rafael Azula Barrera
40th	1952-1953	Lucio Pabón Núñez
41st	1953-1953	Jesús Estrada Monsalve
42nd	1953-1954	Manuel Mosquera Garcés
43rd	1954-1954	Daniel Henao Henao
44th	1954-1955	Aurelio Caicedo Ayerbe
45th	1955-1956	Gabriel Betancur Mejía
46th	1956-1957	Josefina Valencia Muñoz
47th	1957-1957	Próspero Carbonell MacAusland
48th	1957-1958	Alonso Carvajal Peralta
49th	1958-1959	Reinaldo Muñoz Zambrano
50th	1959-1960	Abel Naranjo Villegas
51st	1960-1960	Gonzalo Vargas Rubiano
52nd	1960-1960	Belisario Betancur Cuartas
53rd	1960-1961	Alfonso Ocampo Londoño
54th	1961-1962	Jaime Posada Díaz
55th	1962-1965	Pedro Gómez Valderrama
56th	1965-1966	Daniel Arango Jaramillo
57th	1966-1968	Gabriel Betancourt Mejía
58th	1968-1970	Octavio Arizmendi Posada
59th	1970-1972	Luis Carlos Galán Sarmiento
60th	1972-1974	Juan Jacobo Muñoz
61st	1974-1977	Hernando Durán Dussán
62nd	1977-1978	Rafael Rivas Posada
63rd	1978-1980	Rodrigo Lloreda Caicedo
64th	1980-1981	Guillermo Angulo Gómez
65th	1981-1982	Carlos Albán Holguín
66th	1986-1988	Marina Uribe de Eusse
67th	1988-1989	Antonio Yepes Parra
68th	1989-1990	Manuel Francisco Becerra Barney
69th	1990-1991	Alfonso Valdivieso Sarmiento
70th	1991-1993	Carlos Holmes Trujillo García
71st	1993-1994	Maruja Pachón Castro
72nd	1994-1995	Arturo Sarabia Better
73rd	1995-1996	María Emma Mejía Vélez
74th	1996-1997	Olga Duque de Ospina
75th	1997-1998	Jaime Niño Díez
76th	1998-2000	Germán Bula Escobar
77th	2000-2002	Francisco José Lloreda Mera
78th	2002-2010	Cecilia María Vélez White
79th	2010-2014	María Fernanda Campo Saavedra
80th	2014-2016	Gina Parody
81st	2016-2018	Yaneth Giha Tovar
82nd	2018–2022	María Victoria Angulo
83rd	2022–2023	Alejandro Gaviria Uribe
84th	2023–2024	Aurora Vergara Figueroa
85th	2024–2026	Daniel Rojas Medellín
