= University of the Andes (Colombia) =

Colombian university

- Universidad de los Andes
- Type: Private
- Established: 16 November 1948; 77 years ago
- Affiliations: Universia, Asociación Colombiana de Universidades
- Rector: Raquel Bernal Salazar
- Academic staff: 1,457^{a}
- Administrative staff: 2,416
- Students: 24,653^{b}
- Undergraduates: 14,337
- Postgraduates: 2,515
- Doctoral students: 276
- Other students: 1,688 (Specialization); 7,677 (Continuing education)
- Location: Bogotá, Colombia; 4.601613°N 74.065173°W
- Campus: Urban; 9.7 ha (24 acres)
- Colours: Black and Yellow
- Nickname: Uniandes
- Mascot: Séneca the Goat
- Website: www.uniandes.edu.co
- _{a} This is a total of 581 FTE professors, 105 faculty developing teachers, and 771 tenured professors.

The University of the Andes (Spanish: Universidad de los Andes), also commonly self-styled as Uniandes, is a private research university located in the city centre of Bogotá, Colombia. Founded in 1948 by a group of Colombian intellectuals led by Mario Laserna Pinzón, it was the first Colombian university established as nonsectarian (independent from any political party or religious institution).

The university is academically composed of nine schools, three special academic entities—the Alberto Lleras Camargo School of Government, the Center for Research and Training in Education (Spanish: Centro de Investigación y Formación en Educación, CIFE), and the Interdisciplinary Center for Development Studies (Spanish: Centro Interdisciplinario de Estudios sobre Desarrollo, CIDER)—and a joint academic venture with the medical institution Santa Fe de Bogotá Foundation, offering 31 undergraduate, 18 doctoral, and 38 graduate degree-granting programs in areas of human knowledge such as medicine, engineering, science, law and others.

It has 731 full-time professors, 73% of whom hold a doctoral degree. It is composed of 12 academic units divided into 10 faculties, the Alberto Lleras Camargo School of Government, and the Interdisciplinary Center for Development Studies. It offers 44 undergraduate programs, 87 master's programs, 17 doctoral programs, and 7,066 continuing-education courses. It has more than 143 accredited research groups and a library system with a collection of 681,717 volumes dating from the Middle Ages to the present.

On January 26, 2015, the National Ministry of Education granted it the Institutional Accreditation of High Quality for 10 years. Rankings such as the Quacquarelli Symonds World University Ranking place it among the top 220 universities in the world, among the top 5 in Latin America, and the best in Colombia.

== History ==
=== Historical context ===
In 1930, the Colombian presidential elections resulted in the appointment of Liberal party candidate Enrique Olaya Herrera to an office that had been, since 1880, under Conservative control. The latter years of this Conservative Republic were punctuated by events such as the Banana massacre, which may have been a contributing factor to the Colombian Conservative Party's loss of the presidency.

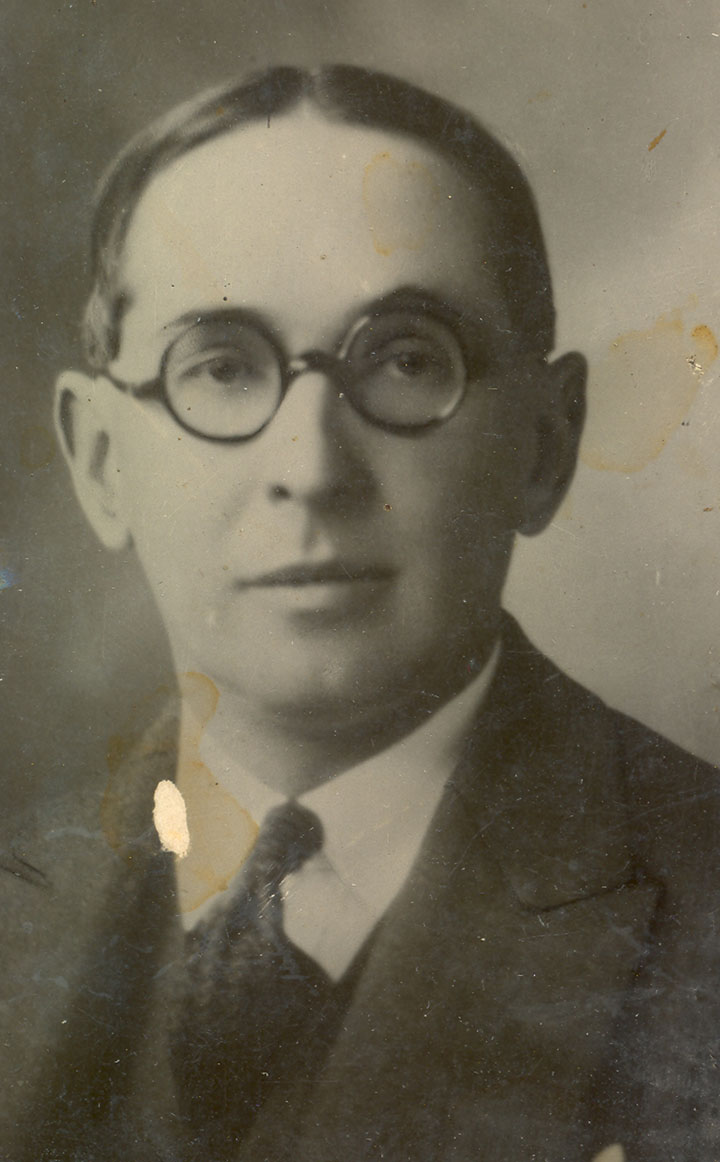
Liberal president Alfonso López Pumarejo started the Revolución en Marcha in 1934.

During this new period of Liberal government, known as the Liberal Republic, the administrations of Alfonso López Pumarejo (1934-1938 and 1942–1946) implemented changes intended to modernize the country. Restructuring of higher education, in particular of the National University of Colombia in 1935, agrarian reform in 1936, and general promotion of industrialization resulted in rapid economic changes and growth. According to some estimates, around 50% of existing Colombian corporations in 1945 were founded between 1940 and 1945, promoting the accumulation of wealth and the creation of a new middle class with political interests and international aspirations.

However, in order to continue industrial development, there was an urgent need for skilled labor, reflected in the speech given by the Colombian Minister of Education to the Congress of Colombia in 1946:

We have a lack of engineers, architects, physicians, dentists, agronomists, veterinarians, chemists and even lawyers (...) in sufficient quantities to attend to the country's needs, and the only solution lies in the enlargement of the universities... in the creation of a university for the country, that responds to what the country calls for.

— Germán Arciniegas, Memoria del señor Ministro de Educación Nacional, Germán Arciniegas, al Congreso de 1946, Bogotá, 1946

These words echo the suggestions made around 35 years earlier by liberal leader Rafael Uribe Uribe regarding the need for the modernization of the educational system. These intellectual currents were coherent with previous educational developments such as the foundation of the Gimnasio Moderno in 1914. Amid the political tension and violence caused by the loss of liberal power in the 1946 elections, social unrest, and industrial growth, leftist liberal presidential candidate Jorge Eliécer Gaitán was assassinated on April 9, 1948, in an event that shook the country and was taken by the founders as "the best argument for the foundation of the university".

=== Foundation and early years (1949-1955) ===
In November 1948, around a year after arriving back in Colombia from Columbia University, accompanied by intellectuals from the elites of both traditional parties, Mario Laserna Pinzón founded the Universidad de los Andes as the first nonsectarian and non-politically affiliated university in Colombia. The main goals with the establishment of the university were to provide Colombia with professionals whose technical knowledge benefited the development of the country, which made it necessary for them to study abroad and bring this knowledge back; and who would become leaders of their nation in the post-war world, facilitated by founders, faculty, and staff occupying important posts in government and institutions. In practice, Uniandes would be modeled after the American university, and its students would receive not only technical but also liberal education, in accordance to the need for the development of the human intellect for a practical, altruistic purpose, as per the Declaration of the Principles of the Founders.

Classes started on 29 March, 1949, with only 80 students taking courses from a small set of faculties and schools. Of note was the Colegio de Estudios Superiores, or college, which was modeled on the American university college and had the responsibilities of offering classes on Humanities, Spanish, English, Contemporary Civilization, and Colombian Geography & History. Classes belonging to distinct curricula, but not specific to each, such as mathematics for Engineering and Architecture students, were also the responsibility of the college. By the second academic year, in 1950, there were around 400 applications for 110 places of study in Uniandes.

Increasing political violence in Colombia during the 1950s did not change the university's stance towards political neutrality, and the inclusion of government representatives in the Board, as well as rectors and administrative staff belonging to both Conservative and Liberal parties, ensured good relations with conservative, military, and liberal Colombian administrations.

Starting in 1950, the three/two program was established at first with the University of Illinois at Urbana–Champaign. Through it, Uniandes students were able to course 5 semesters, or three years, at home, and then transfer to an American university to complete their undergraduate program. Participating universities included Pittsburgh, MIT, Vanderbilt, and Texas, among others. The funds for tuition expenses in the United States were initially provided by Colombian industries such as Avianca and Paz del Río Steelworks; American philanthropic institutions (the Rockefeller Foundation); and Colombian, Canadian, and American private individuals. To manage these assets, the university hired ICETEX, a government agency established by University founder and then-Minister of Education Gabriel Betancourt, whose objective was to promote Colombian students abroad through grants and scholarships.

Throughout the early 1950s, diverse experiments were carried out by the University as per its aspirations to fulfill the needs of its country and become an internationally recognized institution. Some of them failed, such as the Faculty of Aeronautic Sciences, due to low student interest; the Institute for Conservation of Natural Resources, which granted non-professional degrees on its subject matter; and the Preparatory Lyceum of Pereira, intended to equip high school students of this city with the necessary tools to thrive in Uniandes. Important successes were attained by the Cultural Extension Section: the organization of academic conferences whose speakers included the likes of John von Neumann, Arnold J. Toynbee, Hideki Yukawa, Thornton Wilder, and others. The subjects and structure of these conferences would give way to the establishment of the Female Section of the university in 1953, though its programs of study did not confer professional degrees. Active recruitment of foreign professors from abroad and from other Colombian educational institutions, such as the National University, the Normal Superior School, and the Gimnasio Moderno, was also an important strategy for the administrative staff in the initial years of the University of the Andes.

== Administration and organization ==
The university was legally established as a common-utility nonprofit corporation in February 1948. The Colombian government granted it University status in 1964. As of 2022, the Statutes that define the university's structure were last amended and ratified in 2009. Uniandes' organs of government are the Board of Trustees, the Board of Directors, the Rector (president), one or more Vice-Rectors, a Secretary, the Academic Council, the Deans, the Faculty Councils, and support administrative officers.

The Board of Trustees is the supreme organ of the university, tasked with setting its general policies, having the power to amend the Statutes. The board has 30-45 members at all times, 2 of which must be Professors, and 2 of which must be students. The Board of Directors is responsible for the management and administration of the university, through reviews and approvals of the PDI (Programa de Desarrollo Integral): a 5-year development program prepared by the office of the Rector. The latter is the university's legal representative, and it is responsible for implementing the PDI, setting the budgets, and appointing Departmental, Research Center, and Administrative Unit directors. The Deans are the administrative heads of each faculty, and together with the Rector, Vice-Rectors, and Directors of academic units, they comprise the Academic Council, entrusted with disciplinary and academic matters (such as modifying and terminating academic programs and units).

There are 14 academic units: 10 faculties, the CIDER (Spanish: Centro Interdisciplinario de Estudios sobre Desarrollo), the Alberto Lleras Camargo School of Government, Conecta-te (Spanish: Centro de Innovación en Tecnología y Educación de la Universidad de los Andes), and the dean of students. The academic units are home to 745 non-faculty staff as of 2021. There is a total of 20 Administrative Units, which accrue an additional 853 non-faculty staff.

According to a financial audit performed by Ernst & Young Colombia in 2020, the value of the university's assets totaled COL$1.74 trillion by the end of the year, equating to US$426.1 million at the COP/USD exchange rate for 31 December 2020. These amounts comprise cash and cash equivalents, investments, intangible assets, investment properties, among others.

=== Mission ===
The university's Statutes state:

Universidad de los Andes is an autonomous and independent institution that fosters pluralism, diversity, dialogue, debate, criticism, tolerance and respect for the ideas, beliefs, and values of its members.

It also seeks academic excellence, and imparts a critical and ethical formation to its students, in order to strengthen their awareness of their social and civic responsibilities, and their commitment to the analysis and solution of the problems of Colombia. (...)

— Board of Trustees of the Universidad de los Andes (translated by Anthony Letts), Universidad de los Andes Statutes

== Staff ==
As of 2014 Los Andes' faculty members were mainly full-time academics, of whom 70% had a PhD from a top university in the world. Los Andes has traditionally supported instructors in undertaking their master's and PhD studies in different subject areas in renowned foreign universities.

== Student population ==
- 55% male, 45% female
- 30% come from outside Bogotá.
- 95% of the undergraduate students were the top 1% high school students in the country.

== Academic structure ==
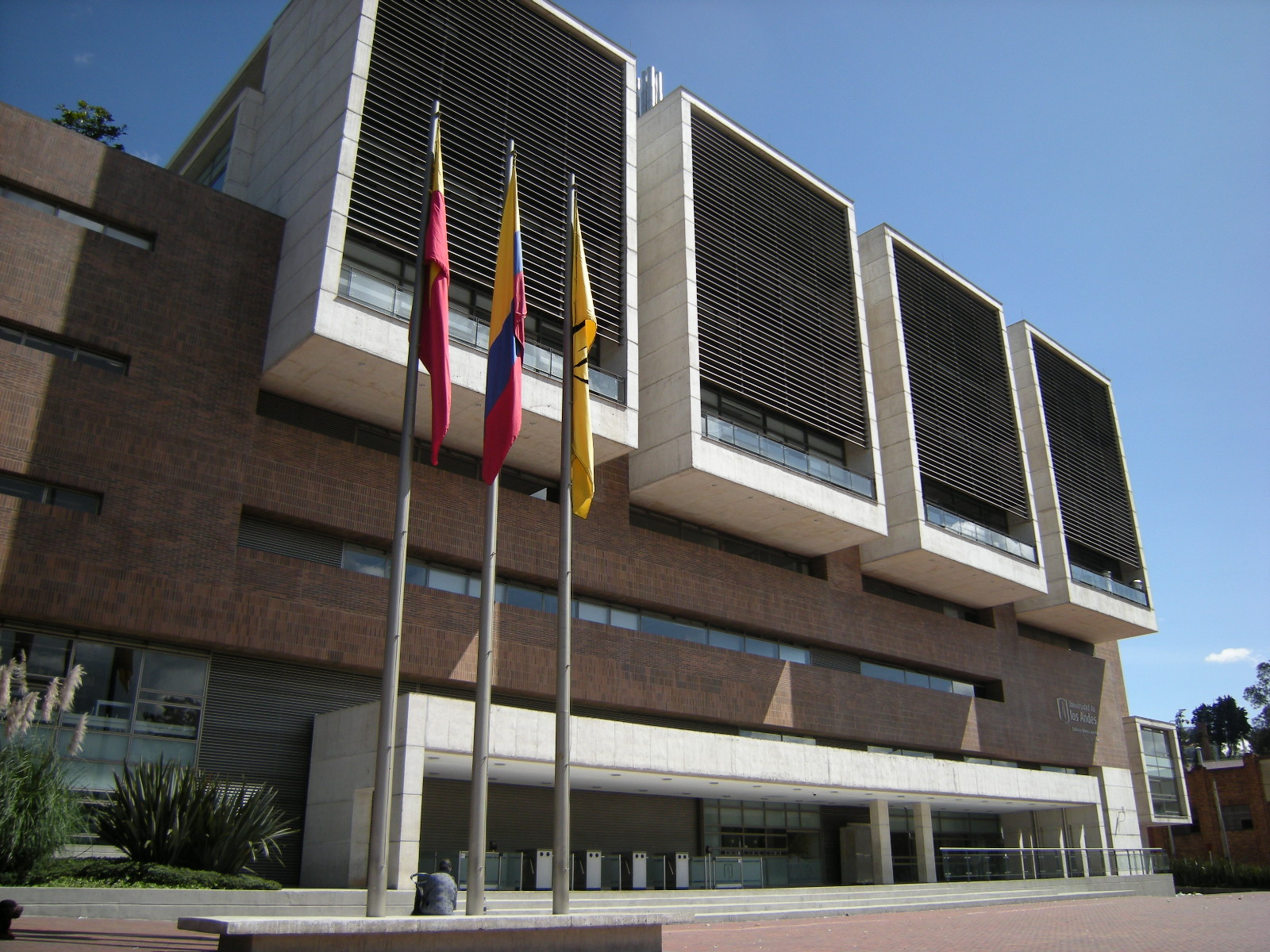
Mario Laserna building of University of los Andes

Students can register in classes from all academic programs offered at Los Andes; this interdisciplinary approach allows students to design their own curricular program, with the assistance of academic advisors. The following scheme shows the academic structure at Uniandes, which includes four cycles: a Basic Professional Cycle (CBP, in Spanish), which refers to the basic subjects belonging to each program; a Cycle of Elective Courses in Socio-humanistic issues (CSH, in Spanish), common to all programs and that offers about 180 courses; a Professional Cycle (CP, in Spanish), which includes the main professional subject for each program; and a Professional Complementary Cycle (CPC), which includes subjects from the specific program and subjects from other programs.

== International students ==
International students can attend the university as visiting students, who must be enrolled in at least three courses per semester, or exchange students, who can take between two and six courses per semester. Los Andes has academic exchange programs with more than 119 universities in 34 countries worldwide.

== Campus ==
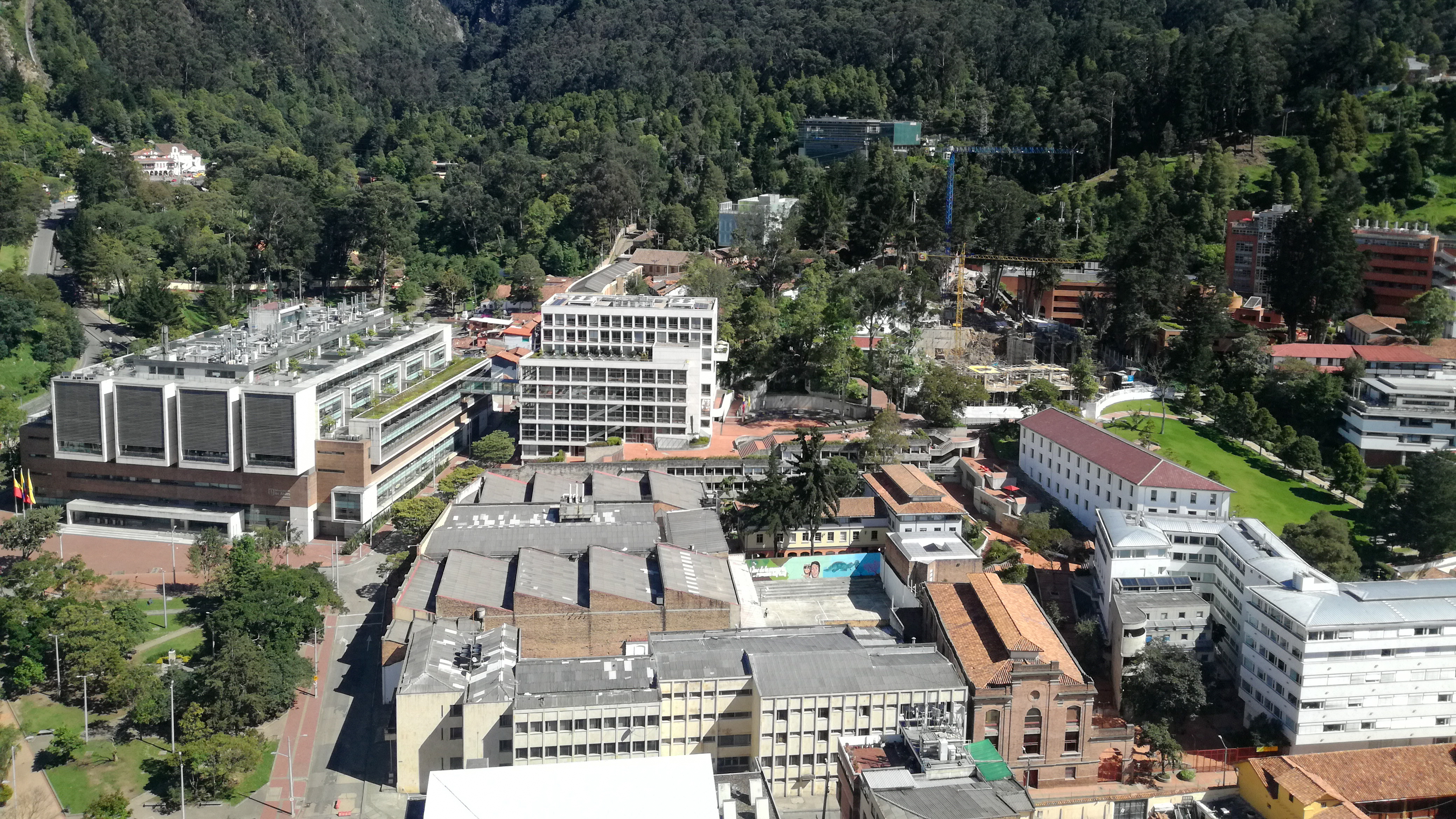
Campus of University of Los Andes in Bogotá, Colombia, taken from neighboring buildings of CityU, in January, 2017

Uniandes started academic activities in terrains rented from the Community of the Good Shepherd, a religious institution, and would continue to do so for around five years before buying the first plots of land, with a size of approximately 0.025 square kilometers. Included in the purchase were several buildings that were used by the religious community, such as a convent and a prison for women. Due to the low university population, the existing buildings were mostly restored and conditioned to provide adequate facilities for academic activities.

The campus is largely made up of a mixture of renovated industrial and religious buildings and newly constructed facilities. The infrastructure covers 180,551 sq mt and includes approximately 116 classrooms, 219 laboratories, a central library, and five satellite libraries (specialized by areas), where more than 445,000 books are available for students. It also has 26 computer rooms and six service units that hire out laptops, offering nearly 2,000 computers for student use (16.5 computers for each 100 students). As of 2017, there are 3,019 computers available for student use in the computer rooms.

In 1956 a metallic cylindrical structure now known as La Caneca (the Trash Bin) was installed on campus. La Caneca is the sports center of the university and it is composed of a gym, a pool, and various courts for sports like tennis, squash, and football.

The university's campus is in Bogota's historical center, an area that houses most of the city's buildings of cultural interest, universities, banks, and large Colombian companies; the main offices of the national and local government; and a variety of cultural meeting places, such as libraries, museums, theatres, scientific and literary centers, and art galleries.

Also on campus are:

- Central cafeteria and many other food stations inside and outside the campus
- Gym and sports facilities
- Health services
- Rest and study areas

In addition to the main campus, the university also has an Internships Center for the Medicine Faculty, located at the Fundación Santa Fe de Bogotá, in the northern part of the city. Uniandes and Fundación Santa Fe—one of the most renowned medical institutions in the country—engage in a joint academic venture.

== Rankings ==
University rankings

Global – Overall
- QS World: 198
- THE World: 261

Regional – Overall
- QS Latin America: 5
- THE Latin America: 5

== Mascot ==
The mascot of Uniandes is a goat called Seneca, after Lucius Annaeus Seneca, the Roman Stoic philosopher. Its story dates back to the late 1940s when a goat roamed the campus freely. Students adopted it, and it soon became a symbol of the university. The goat died in 1966 when it fell off a cliff. Today it is not possible to keep a goat on campus, but Seneca is fondly remembered. The wireless spots are named after the goat, and every year a goat is brought to the university to celebrate "Students' Day."

== Notable alumni ==
- Natalia Castañeda Arbelaez – painter
- César Gaviria – President of Colombia (1990–1994).
- María Ángela Holguín – Ministry of Foreign Affairs (Colombia).
- Fernando Botero Zea – Ministry of National Defense (Colombia).
- Gabriel Silva Luján – Ministry of National Defense (Colombia).
- Rafael Pardo Rueda – Ministry of National Defense (Colombia).
- Alejandro Gaviria – Rector and Ministry of National Education (Colombia).
- Mauricio Cárdenas Santamaría – Ministry of Finance and Public Credit.
- Carolina Benedetti – Mathematician and educator
- Luis Caballero – Colombian painter
- Fidel Cano Correa – CEO El Espectador
- Helena Groot – professor, microbiologist, geneticist
- Ana Maria Rey – Colombian theoretical physicist.
- Gabriela Tafur – Miss Colombia (2018)
- Paola Turbay – Miss Colombia (1992)
- Jorge Luis Vaca Forero – visual artist
- Simón Vélez – architect known for his use of bamboo as a building component
- Gustavo De La Vega – entrepreneur, investor, and speaker
- Bruce Geddes – Canadian ex-novelist, author of Chasing the Black Eagle.

== See also ==
- List of Muisca research institutes
- Excellence research centers in Colombia
