= Ministry of Agriculture and Rural Development (Colombia) =

Government ministry of Colombia

- Ministerio de Agricultura y Desarrollo Rural

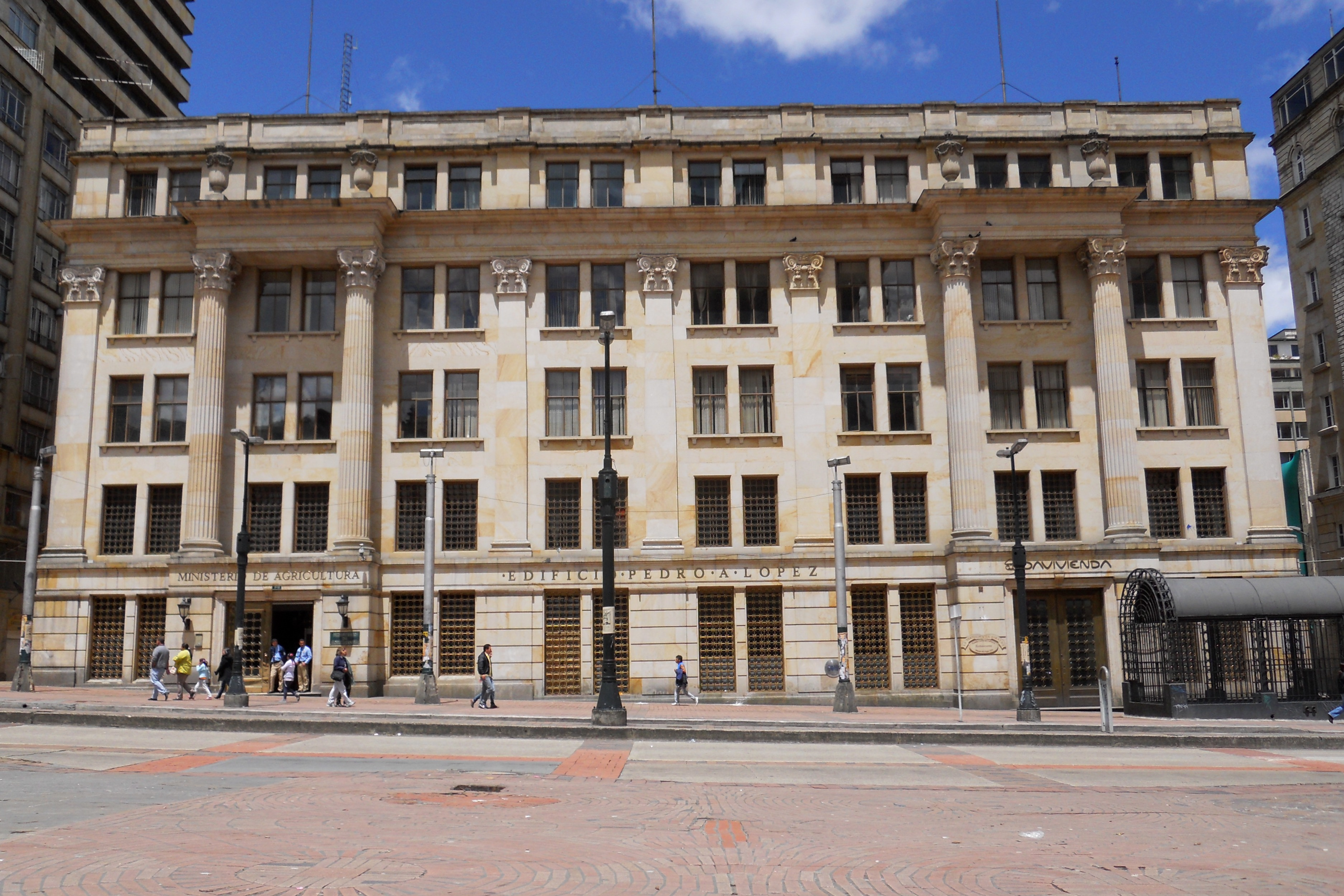
- Pedro A López Building, headquarters of the Ministry.

Ministry overview
- Formed: 24 June 1994
- Preceding Ministry: Ministry of Agriculture and Husbandry
- Headquarters: Avenida Jiménez № 7-65 Bogotá, Colombia; 4°36′05″N 74°04′03″W
- Annual budget: COP$1,309,879,071,470 (2012); COP$1,589,535,431,470 (2013); COP$1,092,443,696,521 (2014)
- Ministry executive: Minister
- Website: www.minagricultura.gov.co

The Ministry of Agriculture and Rural Development (Spanish: Ministerio de Agricultura y Desarrollo Rural) is the national executive ministry of the Government of Colombia in charge of the management and oversight of the rural development and agriculture of Colombia.

== Functions ==
The main functions of the ministry of Agriculture are to formulate politics for the development of the agricultural, fishing and rural development sectors; and to manage the formulation of plans, programs and projects needed to develop these sectors, specially the rural areas of the country. The ministry must present plans and programs to the National Development Plan and prepare and present to the Congress of Colombia draft laws related to these sectors. The ministry of Agriculture must define with the Ministry of Foreign Affairs, the international negotiations related to these sectors. The Ministry is also entitled to create, organize, form and assign through resolutions duties to internal work groups and advising groups within the guidelines previously set.
