= List of entities in the executive branch of Colombia =

The following is a list of Executive Government of Colombia entities:

== Social Security Sector ==
- Ministry of Social Protection
- Caja de Previsión Social de Comunicaciones (Social Provident Communication Fund Register)
- Caja Nacional de Previsión Social E.I.C.E (National Register of the E.I.C.E Provident Communication Fund)
- Centro Dermatológico Federico Lleras Acosta
- Comisión de Regulación en Salud
- Empresa Social del Estado Antonio Nariño
- Empresa Social del Estado Francisco de Paula Santander
- Empresa Social del Estado José Prudencio Padilla
- Empresa Social del Estado Luis Carlos Galán Sarmiento
- Empresa Social del Estado Policarpa Salavarrieta
- Empresa Social del Estado Rafael Uribe Uribe
- Empresa Social del Estado Rita Arango Álvarez del Pino
- Empresa Territorial para la Salud
- Fondo de Bienestar Social de la Contraloría General de la República
- Fondo de Pasivo Social de Ferrocarriles Nacionales de Colombia
- Fondo de Previsión Social del Congreso
- Fondo Nacional de Estupefacientes
- Instituto Colombiano de Bienestar Familiar
- Instituto de Seguros Sociales
- Instituto Nacional de Cancerología E.S.E
- Instituto Nacional de Salud
- Instituto Nacional de Vigilancia de Medicamentos y Alimentos
- Sanatorio Agua de Dios E.S.E
- Sanatorio de Contratación E.S.E
- Servicio Nacional de Aprendizaje
- Sociedad CAJANAL S.A. E.P.S
- Superintendencia de Subsidio Familiar
- Superintendencia Nacional de Salud

== Agriculture and rural development sector ==
- Ministry of Agriculture and Rural Development
- Almacenes Generales de Depósito de la Caja Agraria y el Banco Ganadero S.A
- Banco Agrario de Colombia S.A
- Caja de Compensación Familiar Campesina
- Centro Internacional de Agricultura Orgánica
- Corporación Colombiana de Investigación Agropecuaria
- Corporación Financiera Ganadera
- Corporación Nacional de Investigaciones Forestales
- Empresa Colombiana de Productos Veterinarios S.A
- Fiduagraria S.A
- Fondo Ganadero de Sucre S.A
- Fondo para el Financiamiento del Sector Agropecuario
- Instituto Colombiano Agropecuario
- Instituto Colombiano de Desarrollo Rural

== Environment, Housing and Territory Development ==
- Ministry of Environment, Housing and Territorial Development (Minambiente)
- Potable Water and Basic Sanitation Regulation Commission (CRA)
- Sinchi Amazonic Institute of Scientific Research
- Institute of Hydrology, Meteorology and Environmental Studies (IDEAM)
- John von Neumann Environmental Research Institute of the Pacific (IIAP)
- Alexander von Humboldt Biological Resources Research Institute
- José Benito Vives de Andréis Marine and Coastal Research Institute (INVEMAR)
- Special Administrative Unit of the National Natural Parks System
- National Savings Fund
- National Housing Fund (FONVIVIENDA)
- Regional Autonomous Corporation of the Negro and Nare Watersheds
- Regional Autonomous Corporation of Boyacá
- Regional Autonomous Corporation of Caldas
- Regional Autonomous Corporation of Chivor
- Regional Autonomous Corporation for the Defence of the Bucaramanga Plateau
- Regional Autonomous Corporation of Northeast Frontier
- Regional Autonomous Corporation of La Guajira
- Regional Autonomous Corporation of the Orinoquía
- Regional Autonomous Corporation of the Sinú and San Jorge Valleys
- Regional Autonomous Corporation of Nariño
- Regional Autonomous Corporation of Risaralda
- Regional Autonomous Corporation of Santander
- Regional Autonomous Corporation of Sucre
- Regional Autonomous Corporation of Cesar
- Regional Autonomous Corporation of Upper Magdalena
- Regional Autonomous Corporation of Atlántico
- Regional Autonomous Corporation of the Dique Canal
- Regional Autonomous Corporation of Central Antioquia
- Regional Autonomous Corporation of Guavio
- Regional Autonomous Corporation of Magdalena
- Regional Autonomous Corporation of Quindío
- Regional Autonomous Corporation of South Bolívar
- Regional Autonomous Corporation of Tolima
- Corporation for the Sustainable Development of the Macarena
- Corporation for the Sustainable Development of the Mojana and San Jorge
- Corporation for the Sustainable Development of the Archipelago of San Andrés, Providencia and Santa Calatina
- Corporation for the Sustainable Development of Chocó
- Corporation for the Sustainable Development of North-East Amazon
- Corporation for the Sustainable Development of South Amazon
- Corporation for the Sustainable Development of Uraba

== Commerce and Tourism sector ==
- Ministry of Commerce, Industry and Tourism (Mincomercio)
- Proexport
- National Guarantees Fund, S.A. (FNG)
- Artesanías de Colombia, S.A.
- Bancóldex
- Fiducoldex
- Superintendency of Industry and Commerce (SIC)
- Superintendency of Corporations (Supersociedades)

== Communications sector ==
- Ministry of Information Technologies and Communications
- Administración Postal Nacional (in liquidation)
- Colombia Telecomunicaciones S.A. E.S.P
- Comisión de Regulación de Telecomunicaciones
- Computadores para Educar
- Empresa de Telecomunicaciones de Bucaramanga
- Empresa de Telecomunicaciones de Santa Marta
- Empresa de Telecomunicaciones de Tequendama
- Fondo de Comunicaciones
- Programa Compartel
- Radio Televisión Nacional de Colombia

== Culture sector ==
- Ministry of Culture
- General Archive of the Nation
- National Library of Colombia
- Caro and Cuervo Institute
- Colombian Institute of Anthropology and History (ICANH)
- Colombian Institute of Sport, (Coldeportes)
- National Museum of Colombia

== National Defense Sector ==
- Ministry of National Defense
- Agencia Logística de las Fuerzas Militares
- Colombian National Armada
- Caja de Retiro de las Fuerzas Militares
- Caja de Sueldos de Retiro de la Policía Nacional
- Caja Promotora de Vivienda Militar y de Policía
- Club Militar
- Colombian Armed Forces General Command
- Comisión Colombiana del Océano
- Comisionado Nacional para la Policía
- Corporación de la Industria Aeronáutica Colombiana S.A
- Colombian Civil Defense
- Direccion General de Sanidad Militar
- Dirección General Marítima
- Colombian National Army
- Fondo Nacional para la Defensa y la Libertad Personal
- Fondo Rotatorio de la Policía Nacional
- Colombian Air Force
- Hospital Militar Central
- Industria Militar
- Instituto de Casas Fiscales del Ejército
- Colombian National Police
- Servicio Aéreo a Territorios Nacionales
- Sociedad Hotel San Diego S.A., Hotel Tequendama
- Superintendencia de Vigilancia y Seguridad Privada

== Solidarity Economy sector ==
- National Administrative Department of Solidary Economy

== National Education sector ==
- Ministry of National Education
- Colegio Mayor de Bolívar
- Escuela Nacional del Deporte
- Fondo de Desarrollo para la Educación Superior
- Instituto Colombiano de Crédito Educativo y Estudios Técnicos en el Exterior Mariano Ospina Pérez, ICETEX
- Instituto Colombiano para el Fomento de la Educación Superior
- Instituto de Educación Técnica Profesional de Roldanillo
- Instituto Nacional de Formación Técnica Profesional de San Andrés, Providencia y Santa Catalina
- Instituto Nacional de Formación Técnica Profesional de San Juan del Cesar
- Instituto Nacional para Ciegos
- Instituto Nacional para Sordos
- Instituto Técnico Central
- Instituto Tecnológico de SoledadAtlantico
- Instituto Tecnológico del Putumayo
- Instituto Tecnológico Pascual Bravo
- Instituto Tolimense de Formación Técnica Profesional
- Junta Central de Contadores
- National University of Colombia
- Francisco de Paula Santander University
- University of Caldas
- University of Cordoba
- University of the Amazon
- University of the Llanos
- University of Pamplona
- University of the Pacific
- Universidad Nacional Abierta y a Distancia UNAD
- National Pedagogic University
- Universidad Pedagógica y Tecnológica de Colombia
- Popular University of Cesar
- South Colombian University
- Technological University of Pereira
- Technological University of Choco

== Statistics sector ==
- National Administrative Department of Statistics, DANE
- Fondo Rotatorio del Departamento Administrativo Nacional de Estadística
- Geographic Institute Agustín Codazzi

== Public Function sector ==
- Administrative Department of Public Service
- Escuela Superior de Administración Pública

== Finance and Public Credit sector ==
- Ministry of Finance and Public Credit
- Banco del Estado
- Central de Inversiones S.A.
- Contaduría General de la Nación
- National Directorate of Taxes and Customs
- Fiduciaria la Previsora S.A.
- Financiera de Desarrollo Territorial S.A.
- Fondo de Garantías de Entidades Cooperativas
- Fondo de Garantías de Instituciones Financieras
- Granbanco S.A.
- La Previsora S.A. Compañía de Seguros
- Superintendencia de Economía Solidaria
- Superintendencia Financiera de Colombia
- Unidad de Información y Análisis Financiero

== Interior and Justice sector ==
- Ministry of the Interior and Justice
- Nasa Kiwe Corporation
- Dirección Nacional de Estupefacientes
- Fondo para la Participación y el Fortalecimiento de la Democracia
- National Printing Office of Colombia
- National Penitentiary and Prison Institute
- Superintendency of Notaries and Registration
- Unidad Administrativa Especial Dirección Nacional de Derecho de Autor
- Superintendencia Financiera de Colombia

== Mining and Energy sector ==
- Ministry of Mines and Energy
- Agencia Nacional de Hidrocarburos
- Archipiegago's Power S.Light. Co. S.A. E.S.P
- Central Hidroeléctrica de Caldas S.A E.S.P
- Centrales Eléctricas de Nariño S.A E.S.P
- Centrales Eléctricas de Norte de Santander S.A E.S.P
- Centrales Eléctricas del Cauca S.A E.S.P
- Colombian Geological Survey
- Comisión de Regulación de Energía y Gas
- Corporación Eléctrica de la Costa Atlántica S.A ESP
- Ecopetrol S.A.
- Electrificadora de Boyacá S.A E.S.P
- Electrificadora de Santander S.A E.S.P
- Electrificadora del Amazonas S.A E.S.P
- Electrificadora del Caquetá S.A. E.S.P
- Electrificadora del Chocó S.A E.S.P
- Electrificadora del Huila S.A E.S.P
- Electrificadora del Meta S.A E.S.P
- Electrificadora del Tolima S.A E.S.P
- Empresa Colombiana de Gas
- Empresa de Energía de Arauca S.A E.S.P
- Empresa de Energía del Quindío S.A. E.S.P
- Empresa URRA S.A E.S.P
- Financiera Energética Nacional S.A
- Instituto Colombiano de Geología y Minería, Ingeominas
- Instituto de Planificación y Promoción de Soluciones Energéticas
- Interconexión Eléctrica I.S.A E.S.P.
- ISAGEN S.A. E.S.P
- Sociedad Promotora de Energía de Colombia S.A.
- Unidad de Planeación Minero Energética

== Planning sector ==
- National Planning Department (DNP)
- National Fund for Development Projects (FONADE)
- Administrative Department of Science, Technology and Innovation (Colciencias)
- Superintendency of Residential Public Services (SSP)

== Presidency of the Republic sector ==
- Administrative Department of the Presidency of the Republic
- Agencia Presidencial para la Acción Social y la Cooperación Internacional
- Office of the Vice President of Colombia

== Foreign Affairs sector ==
- Ministry of Foreign Affairs
- Fondo Rotatorio del Ministerio de Relaciones Exteriores

== Security sector ==
- National Intelligence Directorate

== Transport Sector ==
- Ministry of Transport (Mintransporte)
- National Institute of Concessions (INCO)
- National Roads Institute (INVÍAS)
- Superintendency of Ports and Transport (Supertransporte)
- Special Administrative Unit of Civil Aeronautics (Aerocivil)

== See also ==
- List of Colombian Department Governors
