= Industry in Colombia =

The share of the industry in Colombia in the country's gross domestic product (GDP) has shifted significantly in the late 20th and early 21st centuries. Data from the World Bank show that between 1965 and 1989 the share of industry—including construction, manufacturing, and mining—increased from 27 percent to 38 percent of GDP. However, since then the share has fallen considerably, down to approximately 29 percent of GDP in 2007. This pattern is about the average for middle-income countries.

== Government policy ==
The spirit of the 1991 constitution led to reform of the Superintendency of Industry and Commerce (SIC) in order to foster competition and protect consumer rights by strengthening its capacity to prevent monopolistic activities and promote competition and market access. Offenses against free competition, collusion, and abuses of market power were defined, and the SIC gained the capacity to sanction individuals and firms for violations. The changes also strengthened a period of trade liberalization, increasing the degree of competition in domestic markets after a long period of import-substitution industrialization and export-promotion policies.

Before 1990 it was common to have subsidized sources of credit for industries, mainly through the Bank of the Republic (Colombia's central bank), the Industrial Development Institute (Instituto de Fomento Industrial, or IFI), and the Export Promotion Fund (Fondo para la Promoción de las Exportaciones, or Proexpo). Financial subsidies declined significantly at the end of the 1980s and the beginning of the 1990s. Although the role of the Bank of the Republic as promoter of industry transferred to the IFI in 1992, in 2003 the IFI entered into liquidation. In 2002 the Ministry of Foreign Trade merged with the Ministry of Economic Development and became the Ministry of Commerce, Industry, and Tourism. The government created Proexport Colombia, an export-promotion agency, and Proexpo became the Foreign Trade Bank of Colombia (Bancoldex), an export-import bank that now provides financing alternatives for Colombian producers of all sorts in commerce, industry, and tourism.

== Trade organizations ==
The National Association of Industrialists (Asociación Nacional de Empresarios de Colombia, or ANDI), the country's most important entrepreneurial organization, represents more than 650 member firms from a variety of sectors, including the manufacturing, financial, agro-industrial, and services sectors. Since its creation in 1944, ANDI has been actively promoting the strengthening and competitiveness of private enterprise, state-owned companies, and public organizations. In addition to taking a leading role among manufacturing organizations in Colombia, ANDI actively lobbies the executive and legislative branches of government. Besides representing its members at regional, national, and international levels, ANDI is also a leader among business organizations in Colombia.

== Construction ==
Colombia's construction sector has represented between 5 and 7 percent of GDP and between 5 and 6 percent of total employment in recent decades. About 60 percent of the population owns homes. However, financial intermediation in the housing industry traditionally has been low by world standards; total mortgages were 5 percent of GDP in 2008 and have never been more than 11 percent of GDP. Because of Colombia's strong rural–urban migration, more than 70 percent of the population lives in urban areas, but serious problems in housing quality, size, and access to public services have created a housing deficit estimated at more than 40 percent. For many years, governments have played a major role in the promotion of social-interest housing. In order to foster construction, in 1972 the government introduced the unit of constant purchasing power (unidad de poder adquisitivo constante, or UPAC). Based on it, a mortgage system in which debts and interest payments originally were indexed to inflation came into being and was quite successful in the 1970s and 1980s. The UPAC increased private savings and thus the resources available to finance mortgages, boosting the construction sector.

The construction sector boomed between 1990 and 1994 because of a combination of factors, including greater competition and fewer restrictions in the financial markets, increased capital inflows, relaxed regulation and supervision of financial institutions, and a loose monetary policy. The resulting housing-price hike, with increases of 70 percent in real terms between 1990 and 1994, also led to significant mortgage expansion during those years.

With the financial market reforms at the beginning of the 1990s, mortgage companies faced stiffer competition from other financial institutions, and, in order to compete on equal terms, demanded the indexation of the UPAC to prevailing interest rates. Moreover, as real interest rates increased sharply in the second half of the 1990s, among other things as a response to the Asian and Russian economic crises when the value of housing assets began falling, many mortgage holders were exposed to negative equity, eventually losing their homes.

The lack of demand and the excess supply of houses precipitated a sharp fall in real prices. In 1998 house prices had dropped to 1991 levels. This situation further depressed the quality of mortgages and loan guarantees in general, leading to a bust in the housing market between 1997 and 2000. The UPAC was replaced in 2000 by the real value unit (unidad de valor real), which is indexed—just as the UPAC initially was—to inflation rather than to interest rates. Since then there has been a slow recovery of housing prices and an even slower recovery of mortgage volume.

Innovations in housing finance have included Colombian Titling, an institution that turns mortgages into capital-market instruments in order to improve the liquidity of mortgage lenders. Such instruments also improve the matching between the duration of loans and the commitment of resources received by mortgage-lending institutions. Colombian Titling is part-owned by several domestic financial groups, as well as by the International Finance Corporation, an organization of the World Bank Group.

Infrastructure construction in recent years has focused on electricity projects and urban mass-transportation systems. Because of fiscal constraints, the government has promoted greater involvement of the private sector in maintaining and developing infrastructure.

The production of cement and other non-metallic building products, which have a share of 4 percent in manufacturing output and employment, is closely linked to the changes in the construction sector. In Colombia cement output is highly concentrated, with three main economic groups controlling more than 90 percent of total output. The cement sector survived the housing crisis between 1996 and 2000 by reorienting production toward export markets, including the United States. As a result, in 2003 Colombia provided 5 to 6 percent of U.S. imports of cement and clinker.

== Manufacturing ==
A key feature of Colombian manufacturing has been the high concentration of location and ownership. Some 30 percent of output in 2005 was produced in Bogotá, 15 percent in Medellín, 11 percent in Cali, 7 percent in Cartagena, and 5 percent in Barranquilla. Thus, these five cities produced 68 percent of the nation's total manufacturing output.

Three main Colombian economic groups control a significant share of manufacturing output: the Antioquia Entrepreneurial Group (GEA) focuses on food products, as well as cement, energy, and finance; the Santo Domingo Group (Grupo Santo Domingo), on beer, soft drinks, and other investments; and the Ardila Lülle Organization on soft drinks, sugar, and other related businesses. Manufacturing output in chemicals, motor vehicles, and paper is concentrated in multinational firms. Public-sector manufacturing consists mainly of oil refineries and alcoholic drinks.

Colombia has three official sizes of smaller companies: micro (those with fewer than 11 workers), small (with 11 to 49 employees), and medium (with 50 to 199 employees). These smaller firms produce 28 percent of Colombia's output and hire 46 percent of the workers in manufacturing. In 2006, the most important manufacturing sector by value of output was refined petroleum products, followed by chemicals and chemical products, beverages, basic iron and steel products, and milled and prepared animal-food products. In 2005 the most important manufacturing sector for employment was textiles and clothing, followed by chemicals and chemical products, plastic products, cement and other non-metallic goods, and beverages.

Colombia's textile industry represented 9 percent of output and 23 percent of employment in manufactures in 2005, although the share in output has been falling steadily since 1990. Between 2001 and 2003, Colombia was a net importer of textile inputs, while it was a net exporter of apparel. The United States is the main export market for Colombian textiles and apparel, followed by the members of the Andean Community and Mexico. The sector has been one of the main beneficiaries of the Andean Trade Preference Act and the Andean Trade Promotion and Drug Eradication Act. The United States extended these trade preferences to Colombia and other Andean countries because of their continuing fight against the production and distribution of illegal drugs. Colombia's designer clothing is a segment of the industry that has received international recognition in recent years.

Colombia's chemical industry is composed mainly of petrochemicals and agrochemicals. The petrochemical industry includes plastics, synthetic fibers, paint, and rubber. Petrochemical production accounted for 27 percent of manufacturing GDP and 10 percent of manufacturing employment in 2005. However, Colombia imports more than double the quantity of petrochemicals and agrochemicals that it exports. The United States is the main source of Colombian imports, while the Andean countries are the main destination of Colombian exports in this sector.

Two main economic groups have had control of the largest shares in the beverages market, which in 2005 represented 9 percent of manufacturing GDP and 3 percent of employment in manufacturing. The Ardila Lülle Organization is the largest producer of soft drinks and the Santo Domingo Group, of beer. The Santo Domingo Group had a controlling stake in Grupo Bavaria, the tenth-largest beer company in the world, until SABMiller acquired a major interest in Bavaria in 2005, in a deal worth US$7.8 billion. As a result of this merger, the Santo Domingo group obtained a 15 percent share in SABMiller.

In 2005, paper, paper products, lithography, and printing accounted for about 7 percent of Colombia's manufacturing output and 8 percent of manufacturing employment. Input production of pulp and paper is highly concentrated in a few firms, while book publishing is more dispersed. Colombia is a net importer of pulp and paper and has been a net exporter of printed products for many years.

Vehicle assembly and vehicle components represent 2 percent of manufacturing GDP and employment, and those shares have been falling in recent years. Colombia has automobile-assembly plants linked to Chevrolet (the market leader), Renault, Mazda, and Toyota; motorcycle-assembly plants have links to Kawasaki, Yamaha, and Suzuki. Vehicle assembly represents 70 percent of this subsector's GDP, while vehicle components represent 30 percent. Since 1990, there has been greater international competition in vehicle assembly, leading to increases in the number of available vehicle brands and models. Overall, Colombia is a net importer of vehicles, mainly from Japan, the United States, and South Korea. Its main export markets are the Andean countries, especially Venezuela and Ecuador.

== See also ==
- Petroleum industry of Colombia
- Economy of Colombia
