= Santiago Rojas Arroyo =

Colombian lawyer and politician

4th Minister of Commerce, Industry and Tourism of Colombia
- Incumbent
- Assumed office 23 October 2013
- President: Juan Manuel Santos Calderón
- Preceded by: Sergio Díaz-Granados Guida

5th President of Bancóldex
- In office 23 August 2010 – 23 October 2013
- Nominated by: Juan Manuel Santos Calderón
- Preceded by: Gustavo Ardila Latiff
- Succeeded by: Luis Fernando Castro Vergara

7th Director of National Taxes and Customs of Colombia
- In office 23 August 2001 – 7 August 2002
- President: Andrés Pastrana Arango
- Preceded by: Guillermo Fino Serrano
- Succeeded by: Alejandro Aranguren Rincón

Deputy Minister of Foreign Trade of Colombia
- In office 5 October 2000 – 23 August 2001
- President: Andrés Pastrana Arango
- Preceded by: Ángela María Orozco Gómez
- Succeeded by: Claudia María Uribe Pineda

Personal details
- Children: Sofea Rojas Soto
- Education: Pontifical Xavierian University (LLB, 1991)
- Profession: Lawyer

Santiago Rojas Arroyo is the 4th and current Minister of Commerce, Industry and Tourism of Colombia, serving in the administration of President Juan Manuel Santos Calderón. Before his appointment, Rojas, a lawyer from the Pontifical Xavierian University, served as president of the Bank of Foreign Trade of Colombia, Bancóldex, and had previously served as Deputy Minister of Foreign Trade, as Director of the Directorate of National Taxes and Customs of Colombia (DIAN), and as Director of the Foreign Trade Institute of Colombia (Incomex).
