= Ministry of Foreign Trade (Colombia) =

- Ministerio de Comercio Exterior

Ministry overview
- Formed: 16 January 1991
- Dissolved: 27 December 2002
- Superseding Ministry: Ministry of Commerce, Industry and Tourism
- Headquarters: Calle 28 № 13A-15; Bogotá, D.C., Colombia
- Annual budget: COP$27,925,844,083 (2000); COP$30,328,981,093 (1999); COP$25,410,712,564 (1998)
- Child agencies: Proexport; Bancóldex; Fiducoldex
- Key document: Law 7 of 1991
- Website: www.mincit.gov.co//

The Ministry of Foreign Trade also known as Mincomex, was a national executive ministry of the Government of Colombia in charge of foreign trade issues in order to improve the Economy of Colombia. It was merged with the Ministry of Economic Development to form the Ministry of Commerce, Industry and Tourism.

== Ministers ==
Order	Period	Ministers of Foreign Trade
1st	1991-1994	Juan Manuel Santos Calderón
2nd	1994-1995	Daniel Mazuera Gómez
3rd	1995-1996	Luis Alfredo Ramos Botero
4th	1996-1997	Morris Harf Meyer
5th	1997-1998	Carlos Ronderos Torres
6th	1998-2002	Marta Lucía Ramírez
7th	2002-2002	Ángela María Orozco Gómez

== Foreign Relations of Colombia ==
Colombia seeks diplomatic and commercial relations with all countries, regardless of their ideologies or political or economic systems. For this reason, the Colombian economy is very open, relying on international trade and following the guidelines given by the international law.

Regional relations remain good despite occasional issues with neighbors, especially regarding spillover from Colombia's armed conflict, including cross-border guerrilla crossings, the flow of refugees, and the spread of drug crops. These issues are of particular concern to the bordering countries of Brazil, Ecuador, Panama, Peru, and Venezuela. For example, Ecuador has closed its main border crossing with Colombia every night since August 2002, when evidence emerged that Colombian guerrillas and paramilitaries were asserting control over Ecuador's border communities. On May 1, 2004, Ecuador placed further stringent visa restrictions on Colombians seeking to enter Ecuador. Relations with Nicaragua and Venezuela have been strained over territorial disputes. Bilateral committees are negotiating the dispute with Venezuela over waters in the Gulf of Venezuela. Other issues with Venezuela include the presence of illegal undocumented Colombians in Venezuela, and activities of Colombian narcotics traffickers, and Venezuela's support for the Guerrillas in Colombia.
