= Fiscal and Customs Police =

The Fiscal and Customs Police (Spanish: Policia Fiscal y Aduanera, POLFA) is a unit of the Colombian National Police under the command of its Operative Directorate. The unit is in charge of investigating large financial frauds, and usually supports the National Directorate of Taxes and Customs (Spanish: Dirección de Impuestos y Aduanas Nacionales, DIAN).

The POLFA was created by Law 633, article 53 in 2000 to work under the orders and structure of the DIAN in support of fiscal processes and controls, as well as on operations involving tax evasion, money exchange, piracy, and contraband in Colombia. It also provides security at ports where international importing and exporting take place, as well as at warehouses where illegally-introduced products are sometimes stored.
