= María Elvira Pombo Holguín =

Colombian diplomat

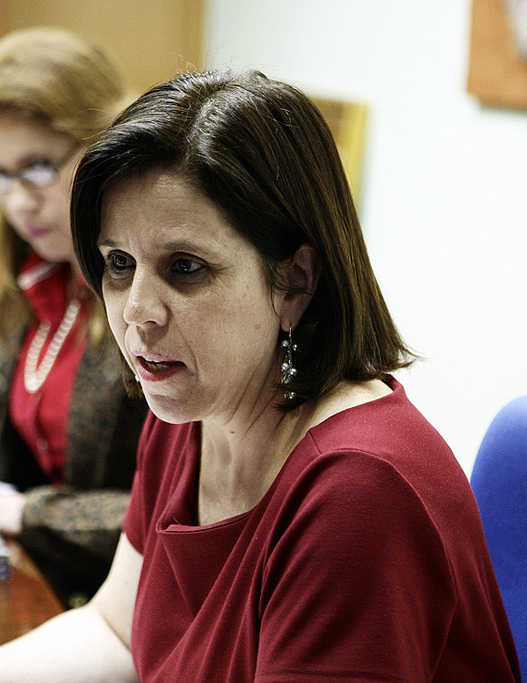

Colombia Ambassador to Portugal
- Incumbent
- Assumed office 15 April 2019
- President: Iván Duque Márquez

Colombia Ambassador to Germany
- In office 28 November 2017 – 14 November 2018
- President: Juan Manuel Santos Calderón (2017-2018); Iván Duque Márquez (2018)
- Preceded by: Hans Peter Knudsen

Colombian Ambassador to Peru
- In office 1 November 2013 – 27 November 2017
- President: Juan Manuel Santos Calderón
- Succeeded by: Mónica Lanzetta Mutis

Colombia Ambassador to Brazil
- In office 19 April 2010 – 30 September 2013
- President: Álvaro Uribe Vélez (2010); Juan Manuel Santos Calderón (2010-2013)
- Preceded by: Tony Jozame Amar

President of Proexport
- In office 16 January 2007 – 12 April 2010
- President: Álvaro Uribe Vélez
- Preceded by: Luis Guillermo Plata Páez
- Succeeded by: Nubia Stella Martínez

Personal details
- Born: 1 June 1960 (age 66) Bogotá, D.C., Colombia

María Elvira Pombo Holguín (born 1 June 1960) is a Colombian diplomat, and the current Ambassador of Colombia to Portugal.

Prior to her appointment, she served as the President of Proexport, the government agency responsible for the definition and execution of the strategy to fuel Colombia's economic growth through Trade, Tourism, and Foreign Direct Investment. She also served as Head of Proexport in Brazil, Colombian Consul-General in São Paulo, and Ambassador of Colombia to Brazil between 2010 and 2013. Also she was Permanent Representative of Colombia to the United Nations Industrial Development Organization.

After, she served as Ambassador of Colombia to Peru between 2013 and 2017 and as Ambassador of Colombia to Germany between 2017 and 2018.

She is the cousin of former Colombia's Minister of Foreign Affairs, María Ángela Holguín.
