= Guillermo Rivera =

Guillermo Rivera may refer to:

- Guillermo Rivera Aránguiz (born 1989), Chilean tennis player
- Guillermo Rivera Bustos (1920–1992), Chilean politician and businessman
- Guillermo Rivera Cotapos, (1868–1928), Chilean politician, interior minister in 1912
- Guillermo Rivera Flórez (born 1970), Colombian politician and diplomat, attended the 17th BRICS Summit
- Guillermo Rivera (footballer) (born 1969), Salvadoran football player
