= 17th BRICS summit =

2025 international summit in Rio de Janeiro, Brazil

2025 BRICS summit 17th BRICS summit
- 6–7 July 2025

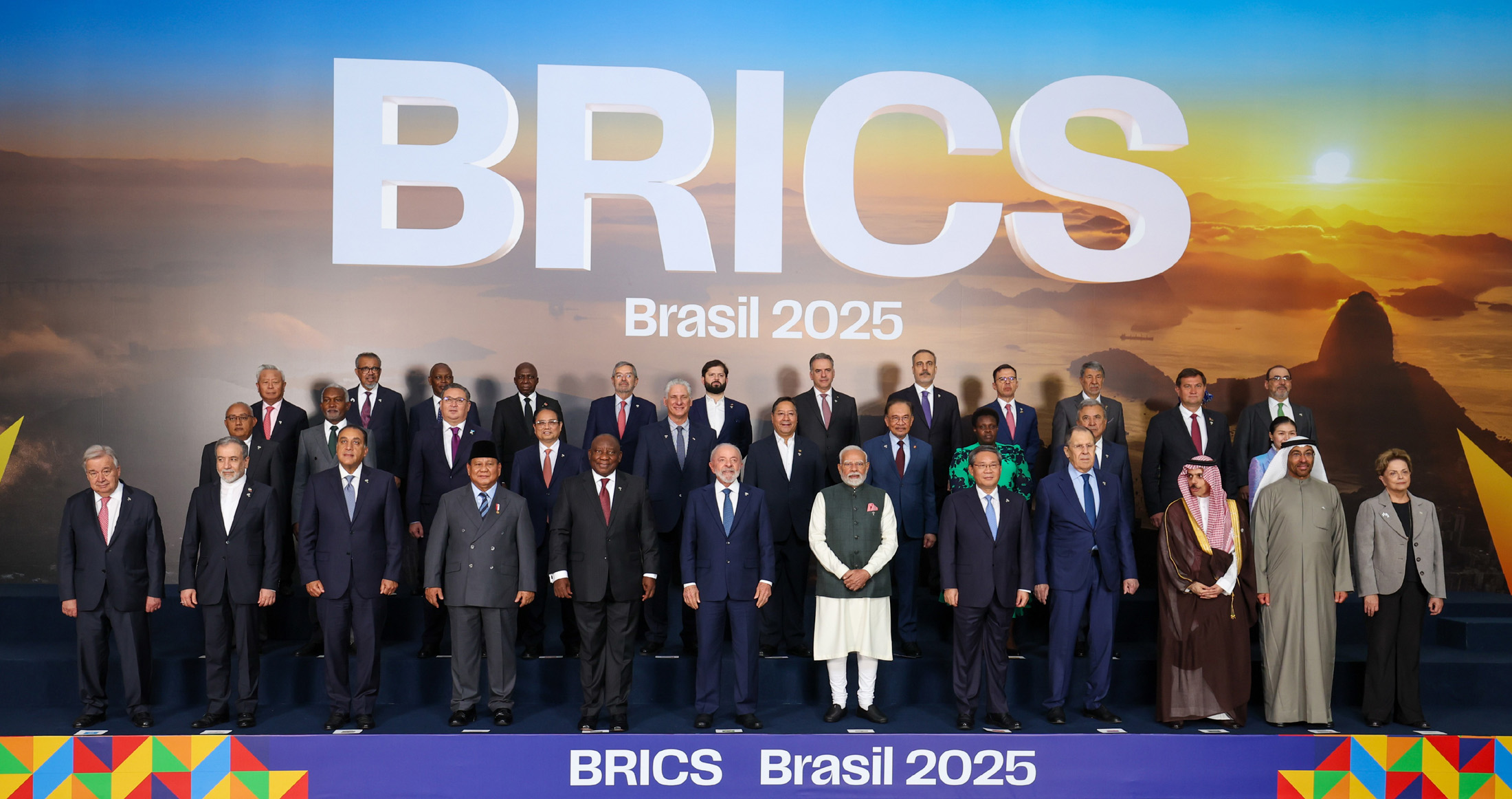
- Host country: Brazil
- Motto: Inclusive and Sustainable Global South (Portuguese: Sul Global Inclusivo e Sustentável)
- Cities: Rio de Janeiro
- Participants: Brazil; Russia; India; China; South Africa; Egypt; Ethiopia; Indonesia; Iran; United Arab Emirates
- Chair: Luiz Inácio Lula da Silva, President of Brazil
- Website: brics.br

The 2025 BRICS summit was the seventeenth annual BRICS summit, held in Rio de Janeiro, Brazil.

== Background ==
The BRICS cooperation mechanism was launched in 2006, initially comprising Brazil, Russia, India, and China; South Africa joined in 2011. This is the first BRICS summit to feature Indonesia after being admitted on 8 January 2025.

Between 28 and 29 April 2025, the foreign ministers of BRICS member states met in Rio de Janeiro, Brazil, ahead of the leaders' summit. Although the ministers failed to release a joint communique, they voiced concern over the rise of protectionist trade practices under the Trump administration in the United States. Chinese leader Xi Jinping did not attend the summit for the first time since succeeding Hu Jintao as CCP General Secretary in 2012. Russian President Vladimir Putin attended the meeting only virtually due to an arrest warrant from the International Criminal Court for war crimes during the Russian invasion of Ukraine.

As of July 2025, the BRICS grouping accounts for over 45% of global GDP (nominal) and over 50% at PPP, represents more than half of the world's population, and controls significant shares of global energy reserves, industrial capacity, and critical mineral resources.

== Preparations ==
From 22 to 24 October 2024, the 16th BRICS Leaders Summit was held in Kazan, Russia. China expressed its full support for Brazil's presidency of BRICS in 2025 and for hosting the 17th BRICS Leaders Summit in Brazil. Starting 1 January 2025, Brazil officially assumed the BRICS chairmanship for 2025. The Brazilian Presidential Office released a statement emphasizing that Brazil's presidency would focus on strengthening cooperation among Global South countries and promoting reforms in global governance.

On 15 February, Brazilian Foreign Minister Mauro Vieira officially announced that the 17th BRICS Leaders Summit will take place on 6 and 7 July in Rio de Janeiro. On 13 May, a joint declaration between the People's Republic of China and the Federative Republic of Brazil was issued, titled "On Strengthening the China-Brazil Community of Shared Destiny for a Fairer World and a More Sustainable Planet, and Jointly Upholding Multilateralism." It reiterated China's support for Brazil's BRICS presidency in 2025 and the successful hosting of the 17th BRICS Leaders Summit. Both sides committed to deepening pragmatic cooperation in various fields under the BRICS framework.

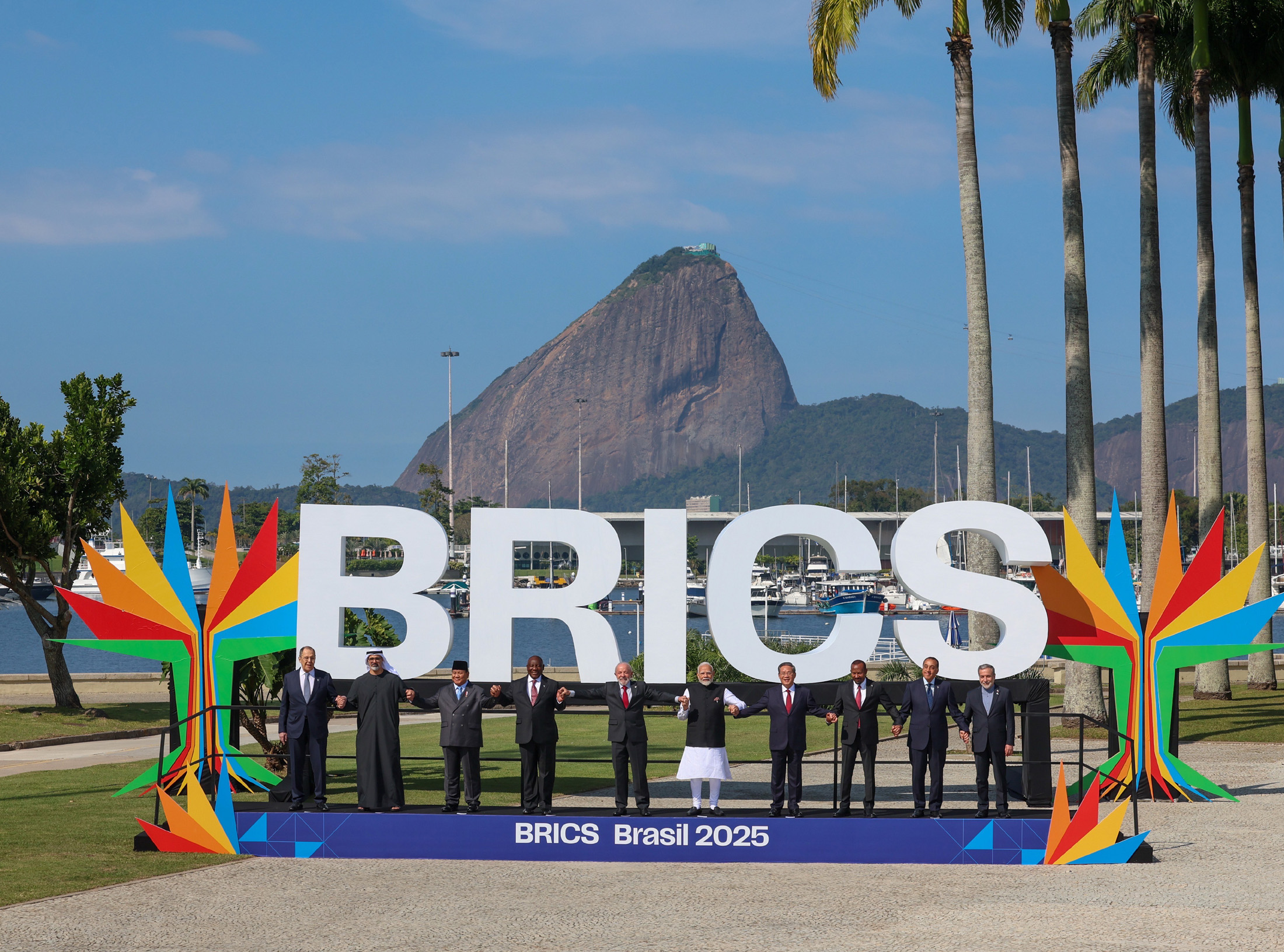
17th BRICS Summit

On 25 and 26 February 2025, the first meeting of the BRICS Coordinators for 2025 was held in Brasília. Brazil proposed six priority agenda items for the 2025 Leaders Summit. These priorities are: cooperation in global health; trade, investment, and financial cooperation; cooperation on climate change response; governance of artificial intelligence; reform of the global security system; and BRICS institutional development. In March 2025, the Brazilian government released information confirming that key topics for the summit will include local currency settlement, global governance reform, poverty reduction, and AI governance.

== Meetings ==
On the morning of 6 July 2025, the two-day 17th BRICS Leaders Summit officially opened in Rio de Janeiro, Brazil. The summit was held under the theme "Strengthening Global South Cooperation and Promoting a More Inclusive and Sustainable Global Governance", focusing on six major agenda items. These included global health, trade, investment and development financing, climate change response, governance of artificial intelligence, reform of the global security architecture, and the institutional development of the BRICS mechanism.

On 6 July, Premier of China Li Qiang attended the first phase of the summit in Rio de Janeiro, delivering a speech on "Peace and Security, and Global Governance Reform." Leaders from the BRICS member countries participated in the meeting, which was chaired by Brazilian President Luiz Inácio Lula da Silva.

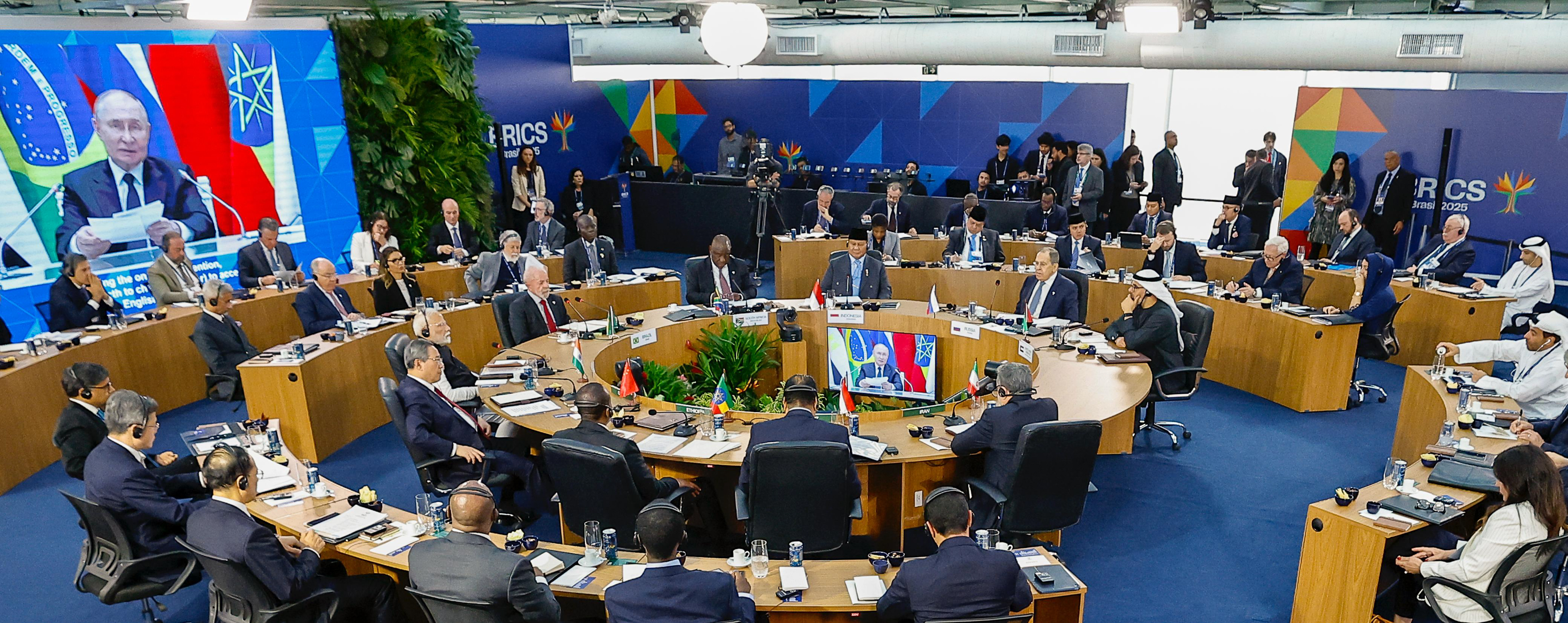
plenary session "Strengthening Multilateralism, Economic-Financial Affairs, and Artificial Intelligence"

On 6 July 2025, the declaration reaffirmed the BRICS commitment to the BRICS spirit and stated that, building on previous summit achievements, cooperation would be further enhanced under the expanded BRICS framework. The focus will be on three pillars: political and security, economic and financial, and cultural and people-to-people exchanges. The declaration also announced that India will assume the BRICS rotating chairmanship in 2026 and host the 18th BRICS Leaders Summit.

On 7 July 2025, the BRICS leaders adopted a declaration on the global governance of artificial intelligence (AI). The declaration expressed the desire to promote the establishment of international principles for the development and application of AI technologies that are inclusive, sustainable, and respect human rights. The BRICS leaders also passed a declaration calling on the United Nations to take the lead in formulating global rules for AI, emphasizing that this rapidly evolving technology must not deepen inequalities between developed and developing countries. The document described AI as a "unique opportunity" to drive inclusive growth, innovation, and sustainability, while warning that without fair governance, it could exacerbate the "digital divide."

== Participating leaders ==
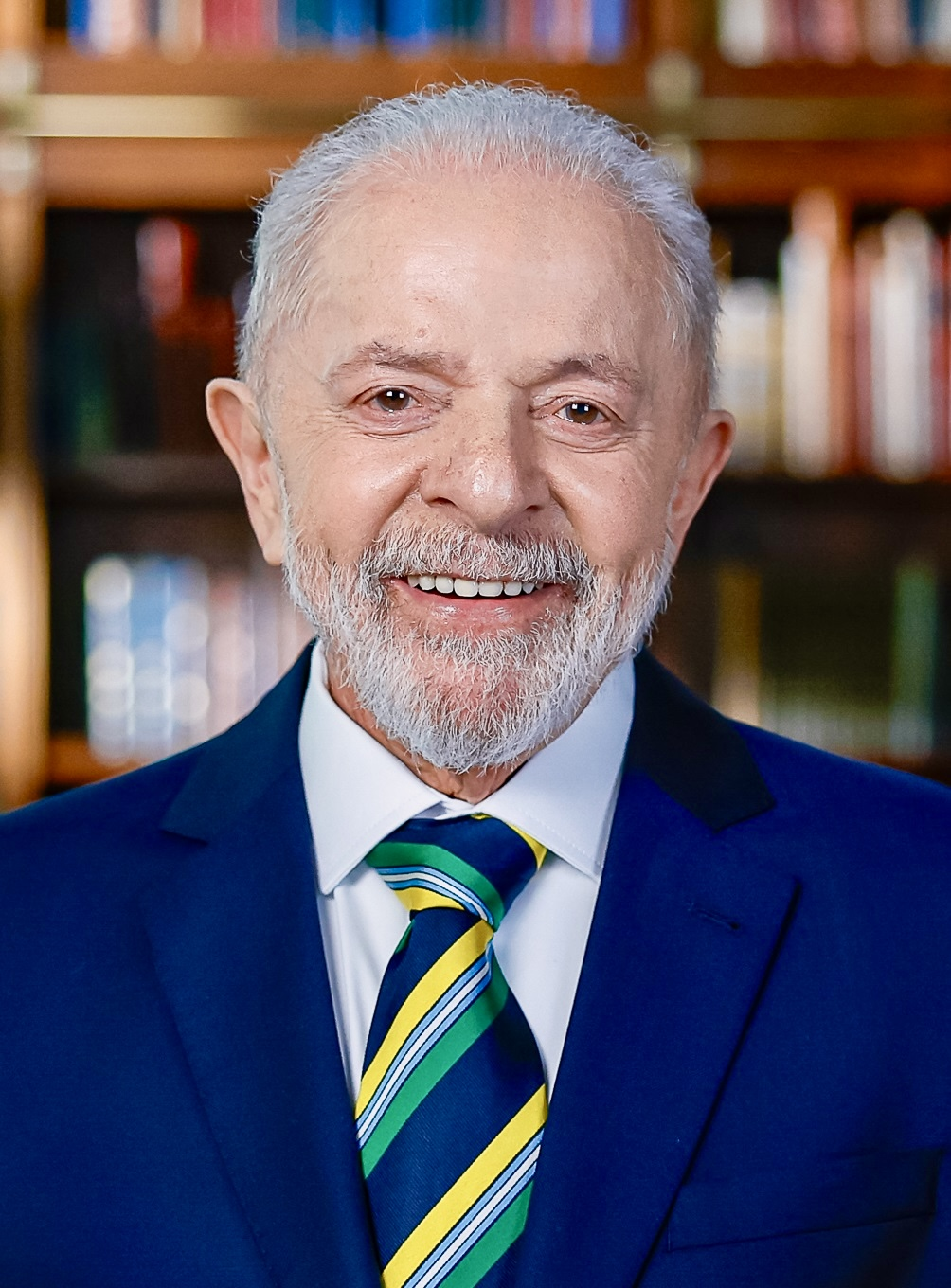
Brazil
Luiz Inácio Lula da Silva, President (Host)

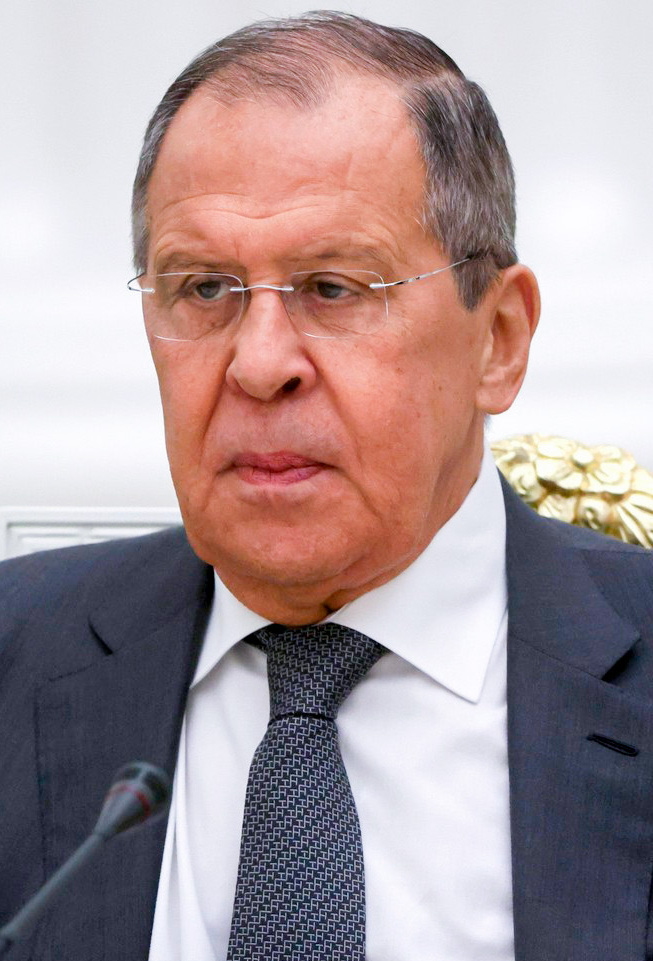
Russia
Sergei Lavrov, Foreign Minister

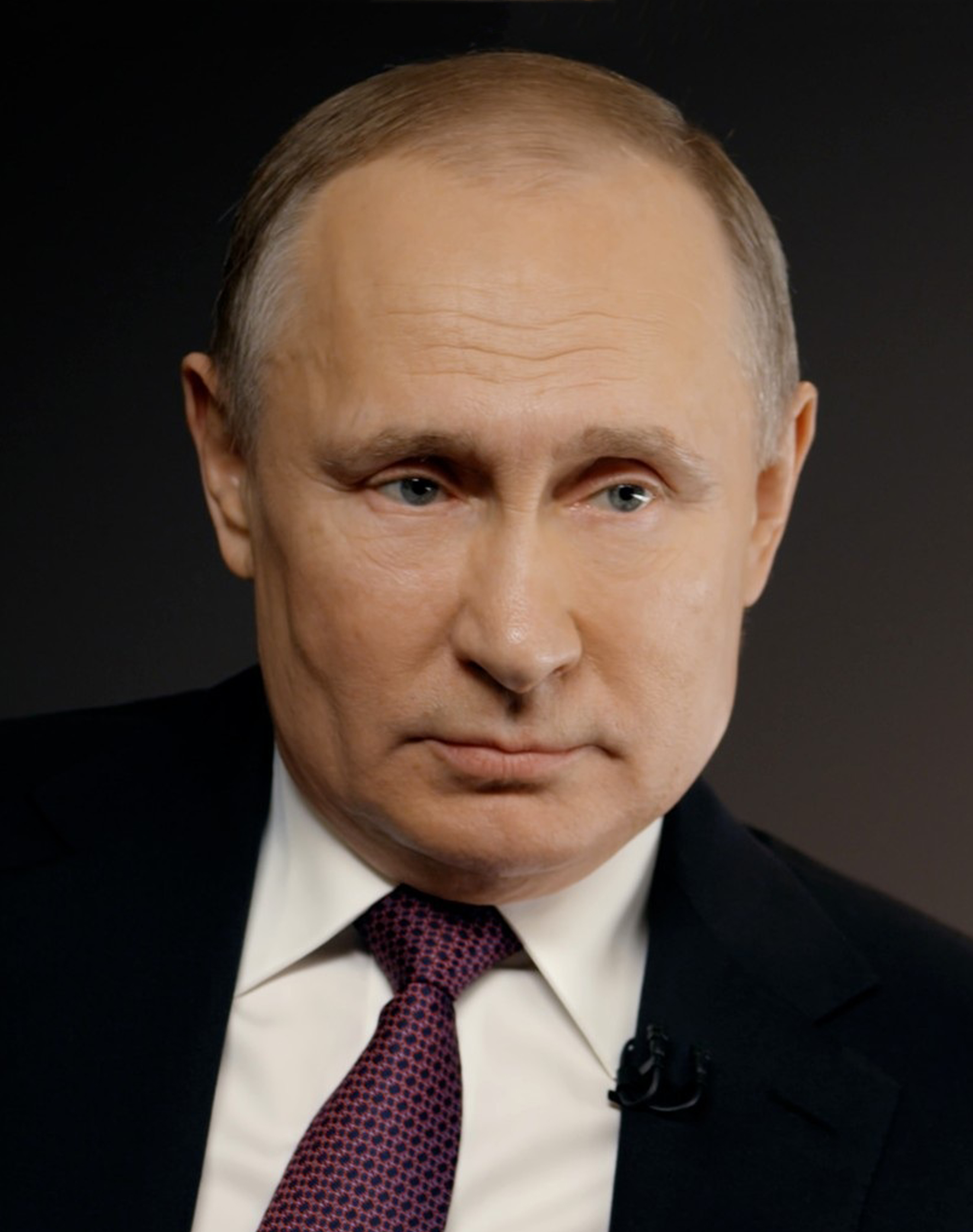
Russia
Vladimir Putin, President (participating virtually)

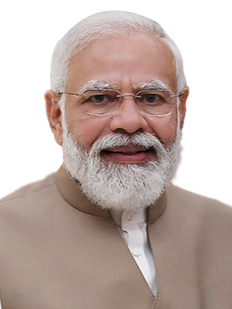
India
Narendra Modi, Prime Minister

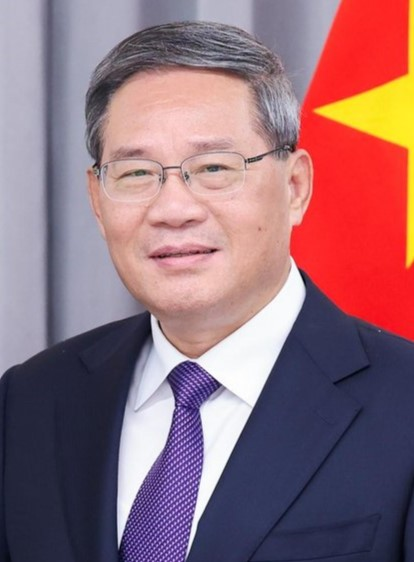
China
Li Qiang, Premier

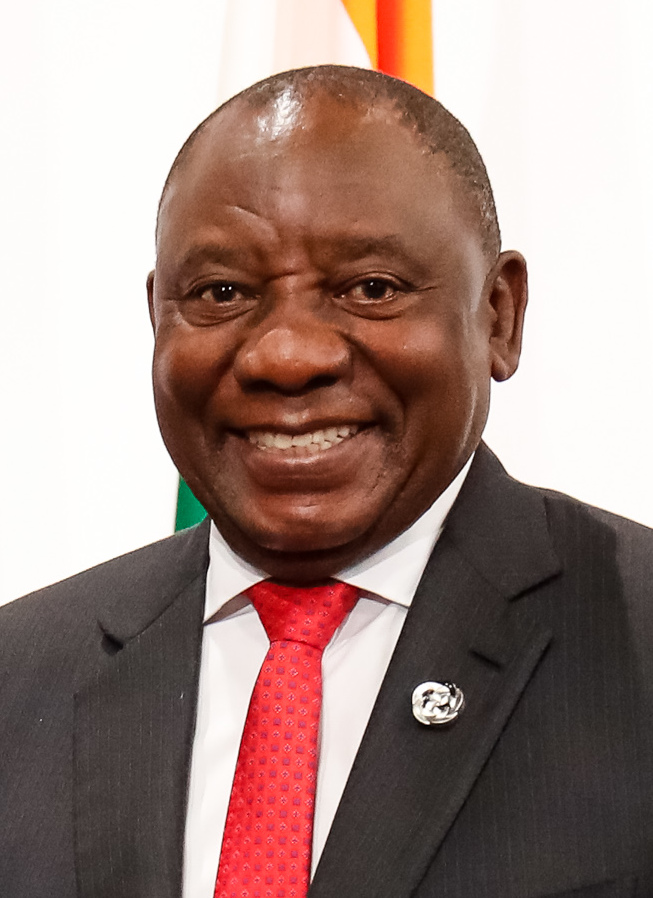
South Africa
Cyril Ramaphosa, President

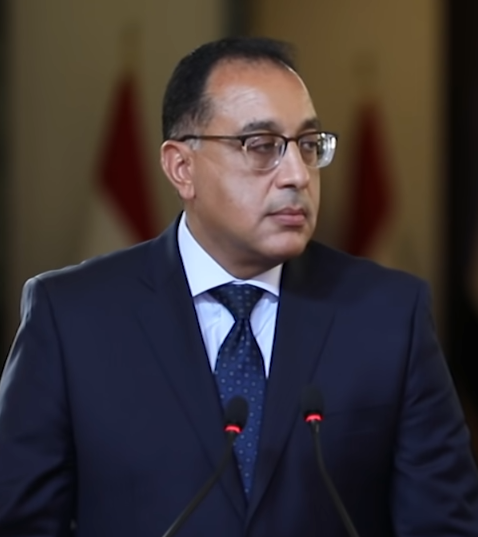
Egypt
Mostafa Madbouly, Prime Minister

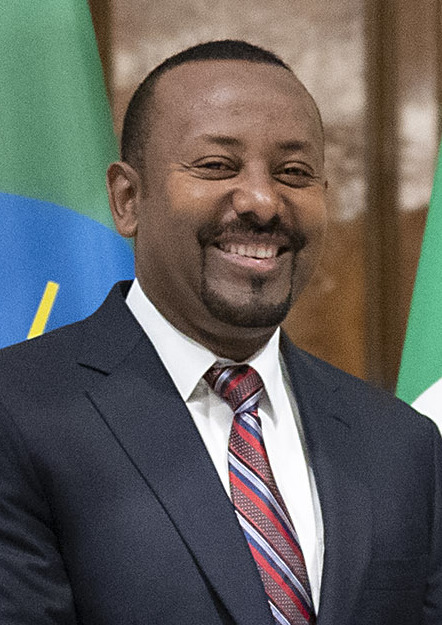
Ethiopia
Abiy Ahmed, Prime Minister

Indonesia
Prabowo Subianto, President

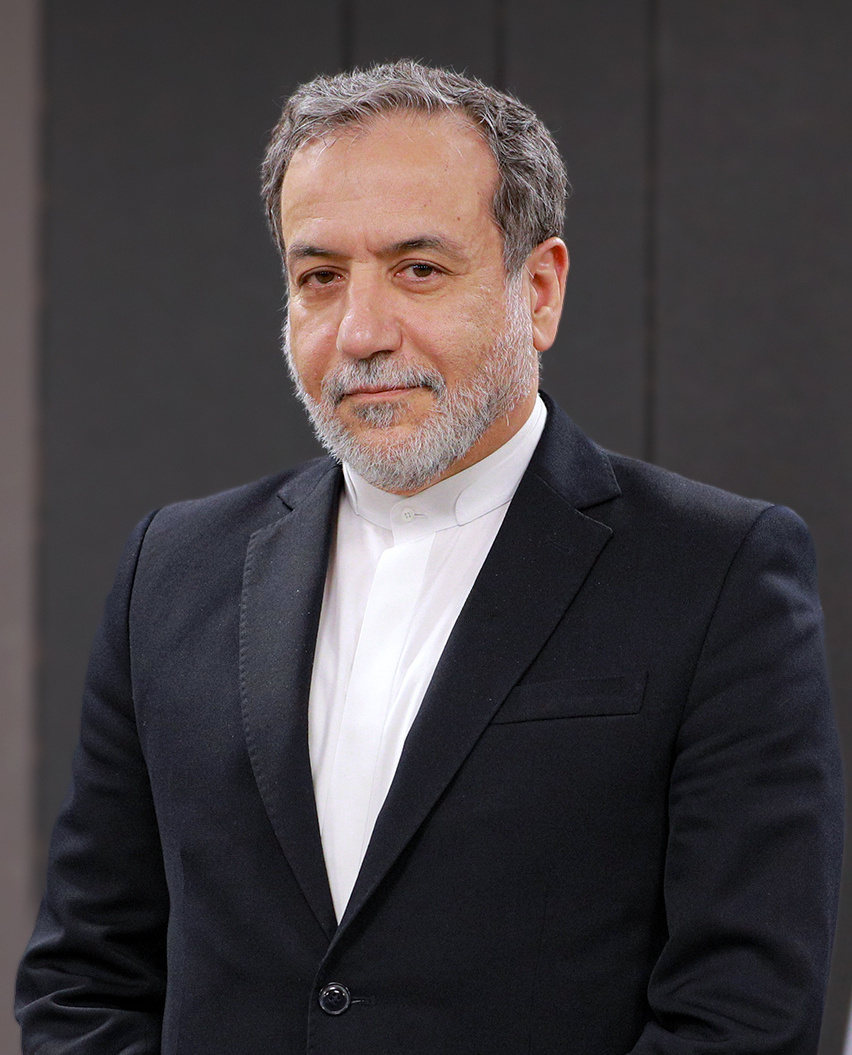
Iran
Abbas Araghchi, Minister of Foreign Affairs

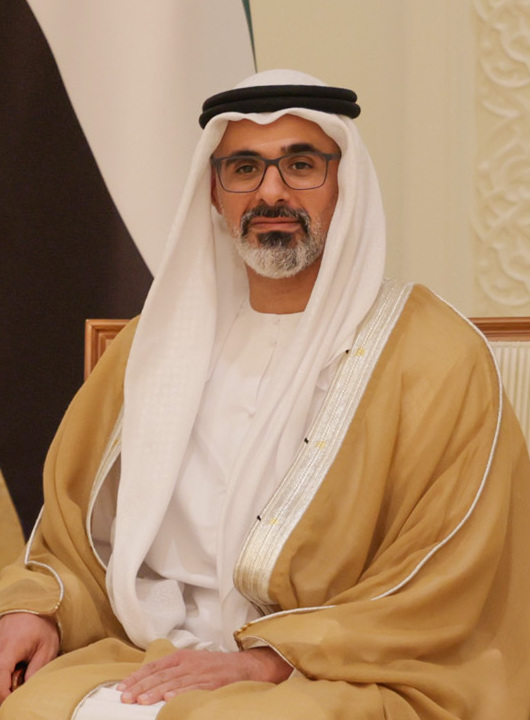
United Arab Emirates
Khaled bin Mohamed Al Nahyan, Crown Prince of Abu Dhabi

=== Other Guests ===
Other Guests from International Organizations, External Engagement Countries, and Partner Countries:

| Country/Institution | Position | Officeholder | Source |
|---|---|---|---|
| Belarus | Minister of Foreign Affairs | Maxim Ryzhenkov | |
| Bolivia | President | Luis Arce | |
| Chile | President | Gabriel Boric | |
| Colombia | Colombian Ambassador to Brazil | Guillermo Rivera Flórez | |
| Cuba | First Secretary and President | Miguel Díaz-Canel | |
| Kazakhstan | Minister of Foreign Affairs | Murat Nurtleu | |
| Kenya | Kenyan Ambassador to Brazil | Andrew Karanja | |
| Malaysia | Prime Minister | Anwar Ibrahim | |
| Mexico | Secretary of Foreign Affairs | Juan Ramón de la Fuente | |
| Nigeria | President | Bola Tinubu | |
| Palestine | Palestinian Ambassador to Brazil | Ibrahim Alzeben | |
| Saudi Arabia | Foreign Minister | Faisal bin Farhan Al Saud | |
| Thailand | Office of the Prime Minister | Jiraporn Sindhuprai | |
| Turkey | Ministry of Foreign Affairs | Hakan Fidan | |
| Uganda | Vice President | Jessica Alupo | |
| Uruguay | President | Yamandú Orsi | |
| Uzbekistan | First Deputy Chairperson of the Senate | Sodiq Safoyev | |
| Vietnam | Prime Minister | Phạm Minh Chính | |
| African Union | Chairperson of the African Union | João Lourenço | |
| Asian Infrastructure Investment Bank | President of AIIB | Jin Liqun | |
| CAF – Development Bank of Latin America and the Caribbean | President of CAF | Sergio Díaz-Granados Guida | |
| New Development Bank | President of NDB | Dilma Rousseff | |
| United Nations | Secretary General | Antonio Guterres | |
| World Health Organization | Director-General | Tedros Adhanom Ghebreyesus | |
| World Trade Organization | Director-General | Ngozi Okonjo-Iweala | |

== See also ==
- 2024 G20 Rio de Janeiro summit
