= Luis Carlos Reyes =

Colombian economist and politician (born 1984)

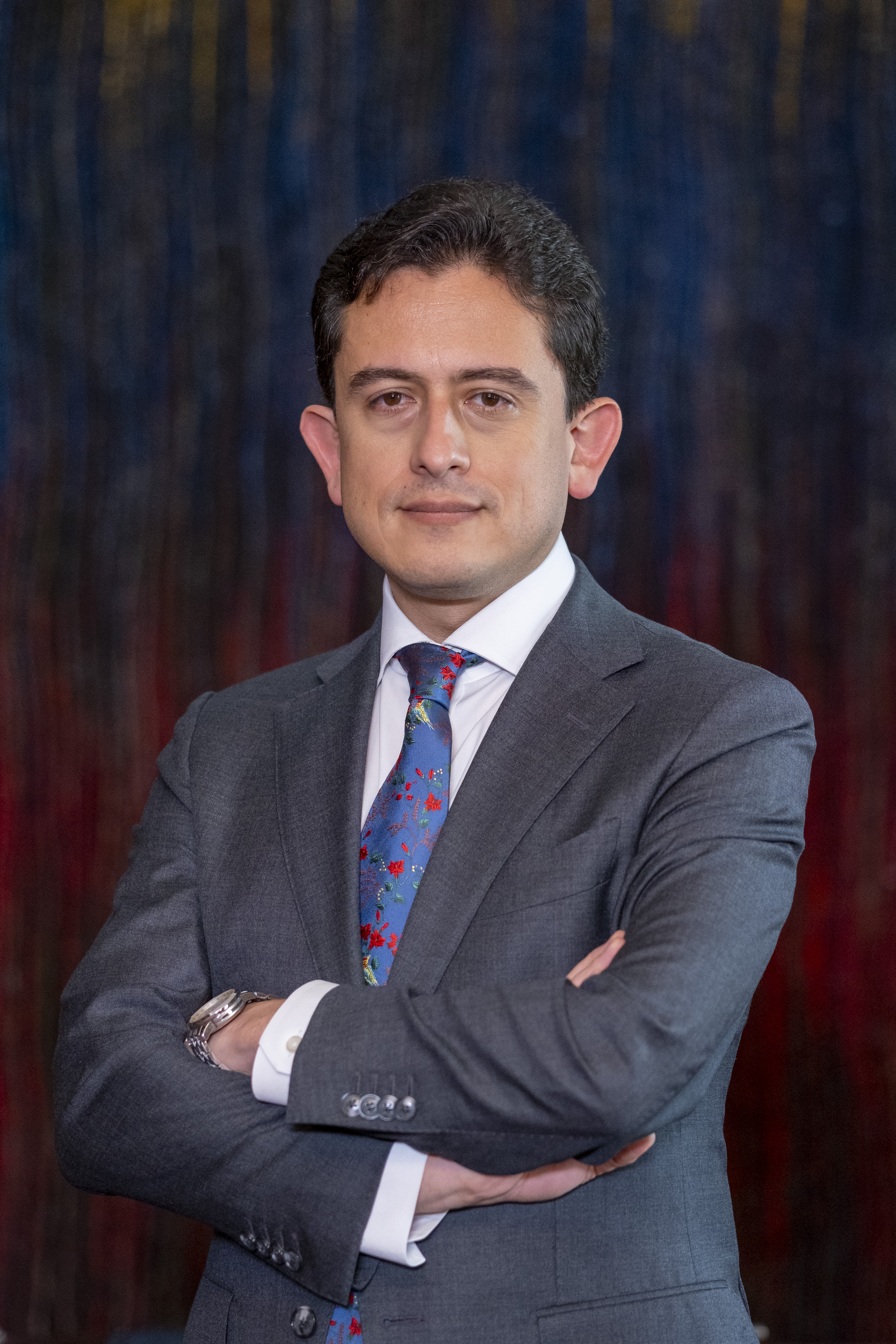
- Official portrait, 2024

Minister of Commerce, Industry and Tourism
- In office June 11, 2024 – February 22, 2025
- President: Gustavo Petro
- Preceded by: Germán Umaña
- Succeeded by: Diana Morales

Director of the National Tax and Customs Directorate
- In office August 10, 2022 – June 4, 2024
- President: Gustavo Petro
- Preceded by: Lisandro Junco Rivera
- Succeeded by: Jairo Orlando Villabona

Personal details
- Born: Luis Carlos Reyes Hernández; May 4, 1984 (age 42) Bogotá, D.C., Colombia
- Party: Independent
- Spouse: Isabella Dishington (m. 2018)
- Education: Florida International University (BA); Michigan State University (MA, PhD)

Luis Carlos Reyes Hernández (born May 4, 1984) is a Colombian economist, professor, researcher and politician who has served as Minister of Commerce, Industry and Tourism from 2024 to 2025 under President Gustavo Petro. He served as Director of the National Tax and Customs Directorate from 2022 to 2024.

Reyes is the co-founder and first director of the Fiscal Observatory of the Pontificia Universidad Javeriana. He has served as an economist at the Federal Communications Commission, visiting assistant professor at Grand Valley State University in the United States, and assistant professor and associate professor at Javeriana University. He has been a columnist for the newspaper El Espectador and a member of the Advisory Committee of the ICFES Research Program. Reyes has worked as an economic researcher most of his life.

As an economist, Reyes is noted for his emphasis on economic development, public economics, and applied microeconomics. His academic research has been published in journals such as World Development and the Journal of Institutional Economics.

Political offices
Preceded by Lisandro Junco Rivera	Director of the National Tax and Customs Directorate; 2022–2024	Succeeded by Jairo Orlando
Preceded by Germán Umaña	Minister of Commerce, Industry and Tourism; 2024–2025	Succeeded by Diana Morales
