= UPAC =

UPAC may refer to:

- Ulster Performing Arts Center, a theater in Kingston, New York
- Unité permanente anticorruption, a Quebec regulatory agency
- University Place Aquatic Club, a swim team in University Place, Washington
- Unidad de poder adquisitivo constante, unit of constant purchasing power introduced in 1972 in Colombia (see Industry of Colombia)
