= Diario Oficial (Colombia) =

Government gazette of Colombia

- Front page of issue 48,748 of Diario Oficial.
- Type: Official journal
- Publisher: National Printing Office
- Editor-in-chief: Adriana Herrera Beltrán
- Founded: 30 April 1864
- Language: Spanish
- Headquarters: Carrera 66 № 24-09; Bogotá, D.C., Colombia
- ISSN: 0122-2112
- OCLC number: 500057889
- Website: Journal's homepage

The Diario Oficial is the official journal of the Government of Colombia that contains the laws, decrees, acts, and most pertinent documents and public notices of the President, Congress, and government agencies of Colombia. It is a daily (except holidays) publication, and was established on 28 April 1864 by means of an executive decree issued by President Manuel Murillo Toro; its first issue appeared on 30 April 1864, publishing the legal information of the day before.

The Diario Oficial is printed by the National Printing Office.
