= Embassy of Colombia, Brasília =

Colombian diplomatic mission in Brazil

- Location: Asa Sul
- Address: Avenida das Nações; SES Quadra 803 Lote 10; Brasília, DF, 70200-030, Brazil
- Coordinates: 15°48′36.55″S 47°52′39.33″W
- Ambassador: María Elvira Pombo Holguín

The Embassy of Colombia in Brasília is the diplomatic mission of the Republic of Colombia to the Federative Republic of Brazil; it is headed by the Ambassador of Colombia to Brazil. It is located in the Southern Embassy Sector (SES) in the Asa Sul district of Brasília, precisely on lot 10 of block 803.

The embassy's chancery, along with the ambassador's residence, which is located in the same complex, were built in 1979 and designed by Brazilian architect César Barney Caldas, and inaugurated in 1981 by President of Colombia, Julio Turbay Ayala, the President of Brazil, João Batista Figueiredo, and Ambassador of Colombia to Brazil, Germán Rodríguez Fonnegra. The buildings are essentially functional and sober with straight horizontal lines, and naked concrete.
