= Diana Morales =

Colombian political scientist (born 1988)

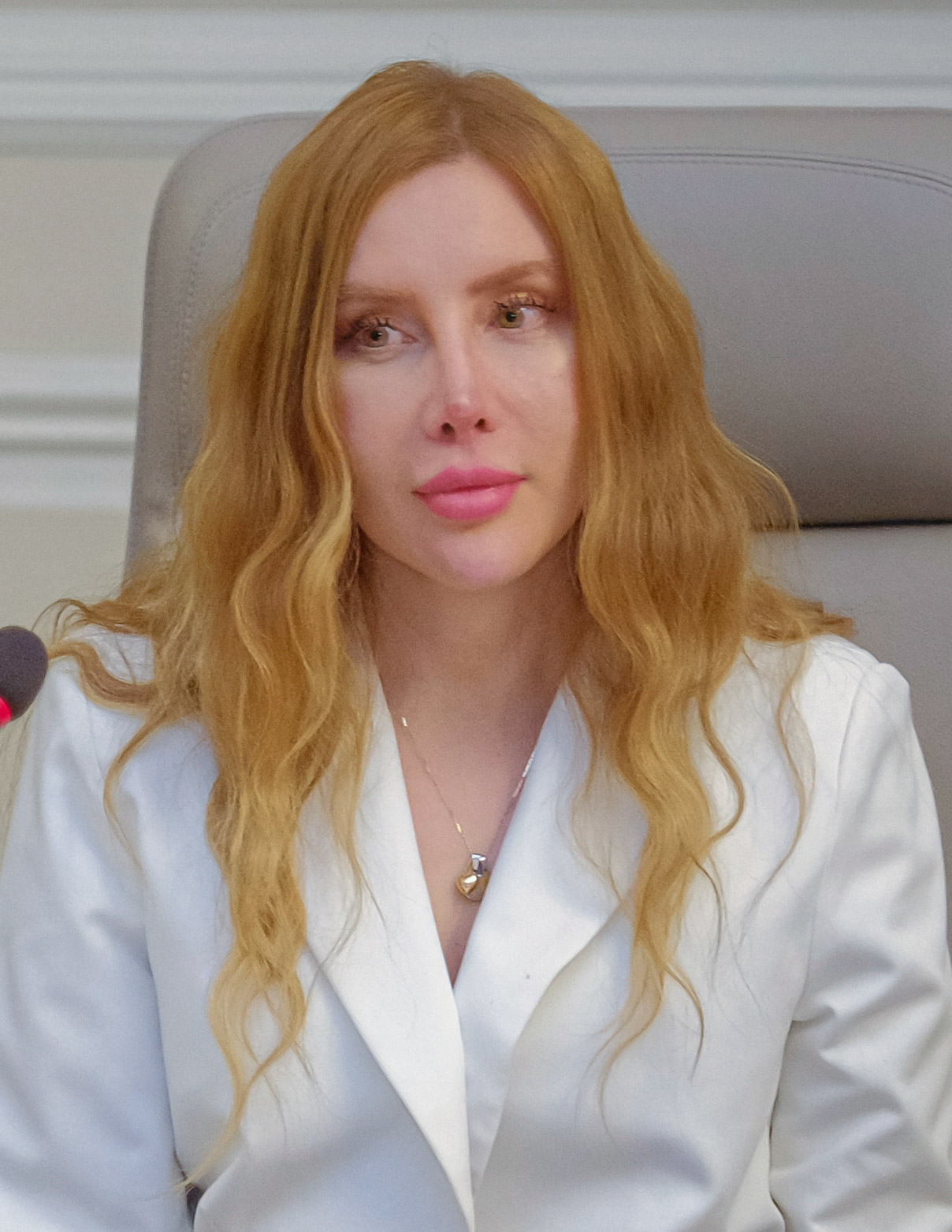
- Morales in June 2025

Minister of Commerce, Industry and Tourism
- In office June 4, 2025 – 7 August 2026
- President: Gustavo Petro
- Preceded by: Luis Carlos Reyes
- Succeeded by: Mauricio Gómez Amín

Personal details
- Born: Diana Marcela Morales Rojas; 1988 (age 37–38) Arauca, Arauca, Colombia
- Party: Liberal (2009-present)
- Education: Del Rosario University; Pontificia Universidad Javeriana
- Occupation: Politician

Diana Marcela Morales Rojas (born c. 1988) is a Colombian political scientist and politician who served as Minister of Commerce, Industry and Tourism from 2025 to 2026. A member of the Liberal party, she has served as inter-institutional manager of the Victims Unit, advisor to the National Administrative Department of Statistics directorate, and advisor to the office of the Minister of Technology, Information, and Communications.

Born in Arauca, Arauca, Morales studied political science at the Del Rosario University. She served as Secretary of the Sixth and Fourth Permanent Constitutional Committees of the Chamber of Representatives from 2018 to 2025.

== Early life and career ==
Morales was born in Arauca, Arauca in c. 1988. She studied political science at the Del Rosario University. She later obtained a master's degree in interdisciplinary development studies with an emphasis on security, peace and development from the University of the Andes, where he also obtained a specialization in state and public policy.

In June 2025, Morales was appointed by President Gustavo Petro as Minister of Trade, Industry, and Tourism, replacing Luis Carlos Reyes. Her appointment sparked speculation due to her membership in the Liberal Party and her close ties to Simón Gaviria, son of former President César Gaviria, the party's leader. President Gaviria later stated that Morales did not represent the party. Morales officially assumed the ministry on June 5, 2025, almost automatically taking on the role of managing the tariff crisis with the United States and continuing the strategic policy with a slight rapprochement with China.

Political offices
Preceded by Luis Carlos Reyes	Minister of Commerce, Industry and Tourism; 2025-2026	Succeeded by Mauricio Gómez Amín
Order of precedence
Preceded by Edwin Palma as Minister of Mines and Energy	Order of precedence of Colombia as Minister of Commerce, Industry and Tourism; June 4, 2025-August 7, 2026	Succeeded by Daniel Rojas as Minister of National Education
