= Colombian handicrafts =

Colombian handicraft (Spanish: artesanía colombiana) history can be traced back to the Stone Age to the lithic instruments in El Abra stadial. Some of the first pottery samples known in Colombia date back to 3500 B.C. They were found in the Neolithic 3 — Pottery Neolithic (PN) Zipacón settlements. The earliest examples of goldwork have been attributed to the Tumaco people of the Pacific coast and date to around 325 BCE. Gold would play a pivotal role in luring the Spanish to the area now called Colombia during the 16th century (See: El Dorado).

Colombian arts and crafts can be categorised into two major divisions: traditional and modern.

== Traditional ==
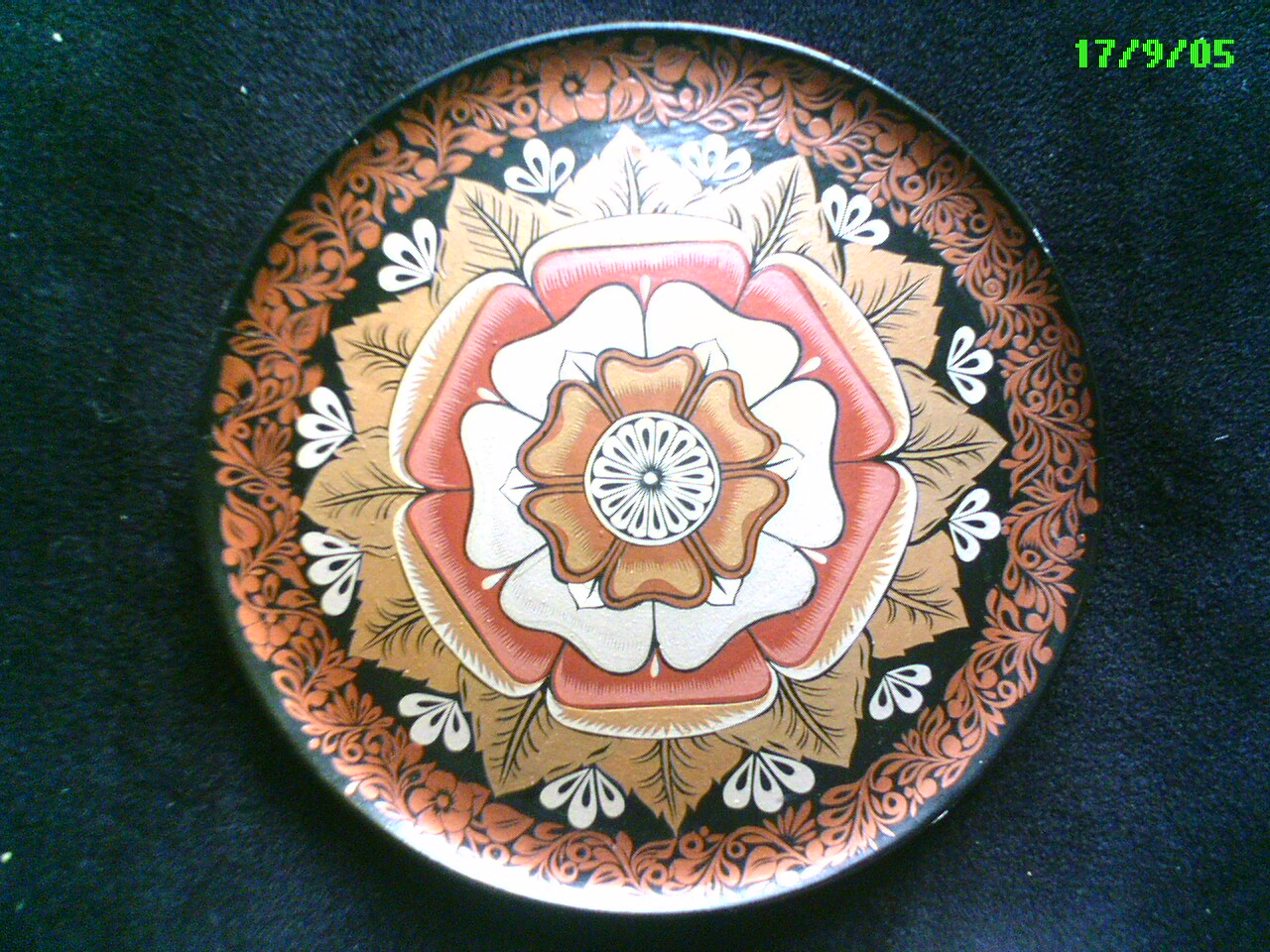
The Pasto Lacquer is a decorative handicraft of precolumbian origin, that uses a type of natural rubber (the resin of the Mopa-mopa tree, Elavagia pastoensis Mora) which is colored and then stretched over woodwork pieces.

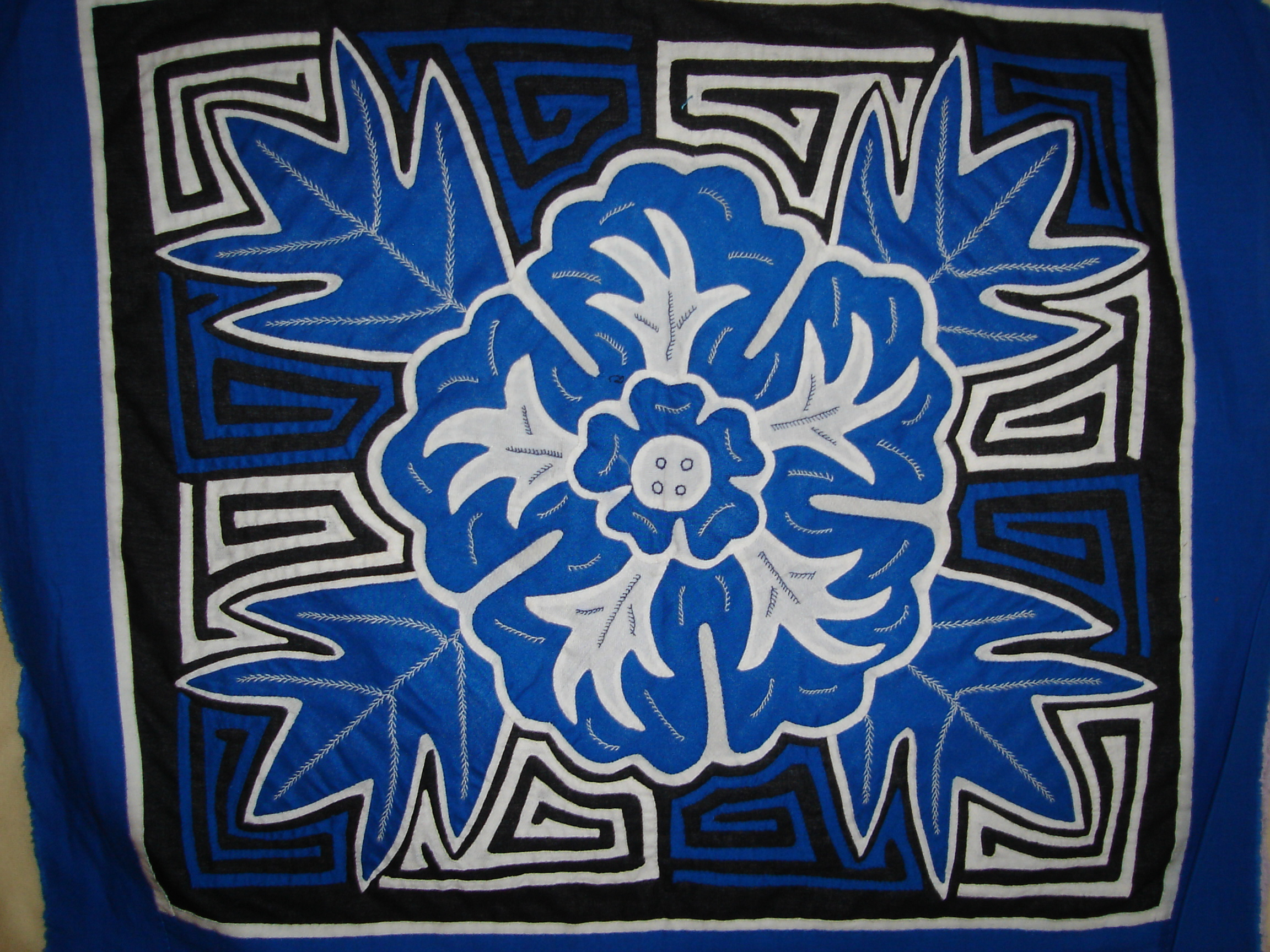
Mola fabric produced by the indigenous Guna people

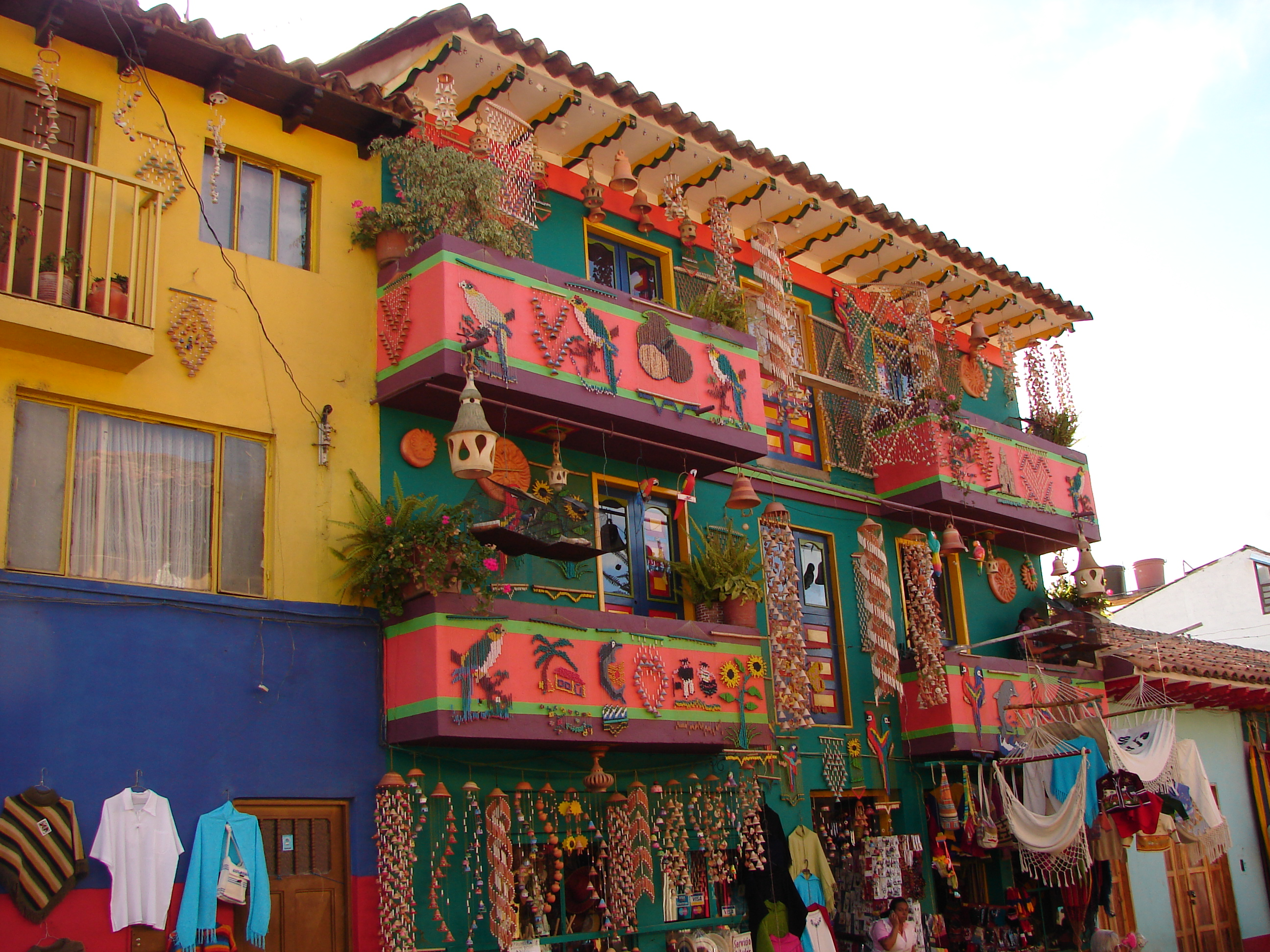
Ruana garments and pottery ornaments in Ráquira

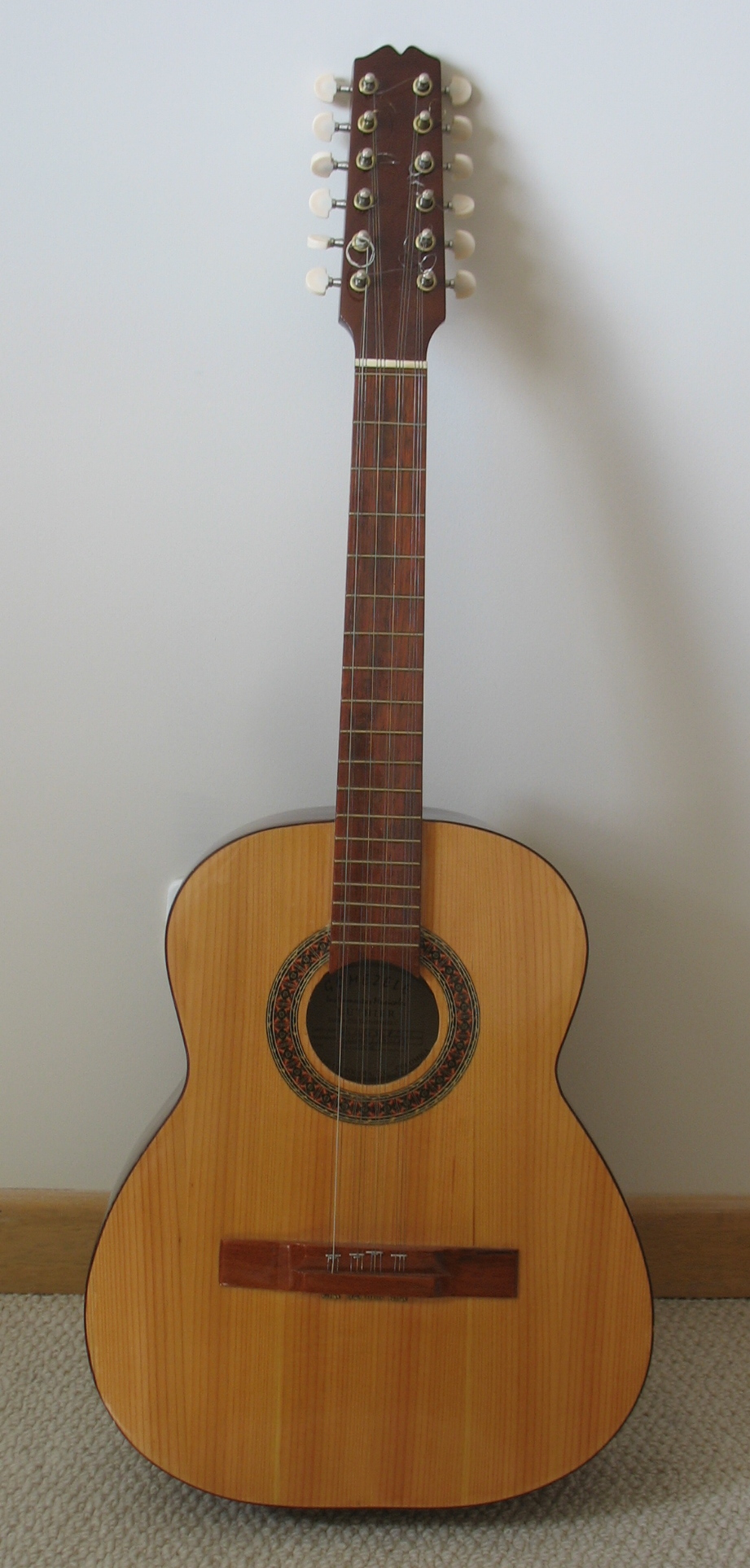
Fabrication of Tiples is traditional in Chiquinquirá

=== Contemporary/Modern ===
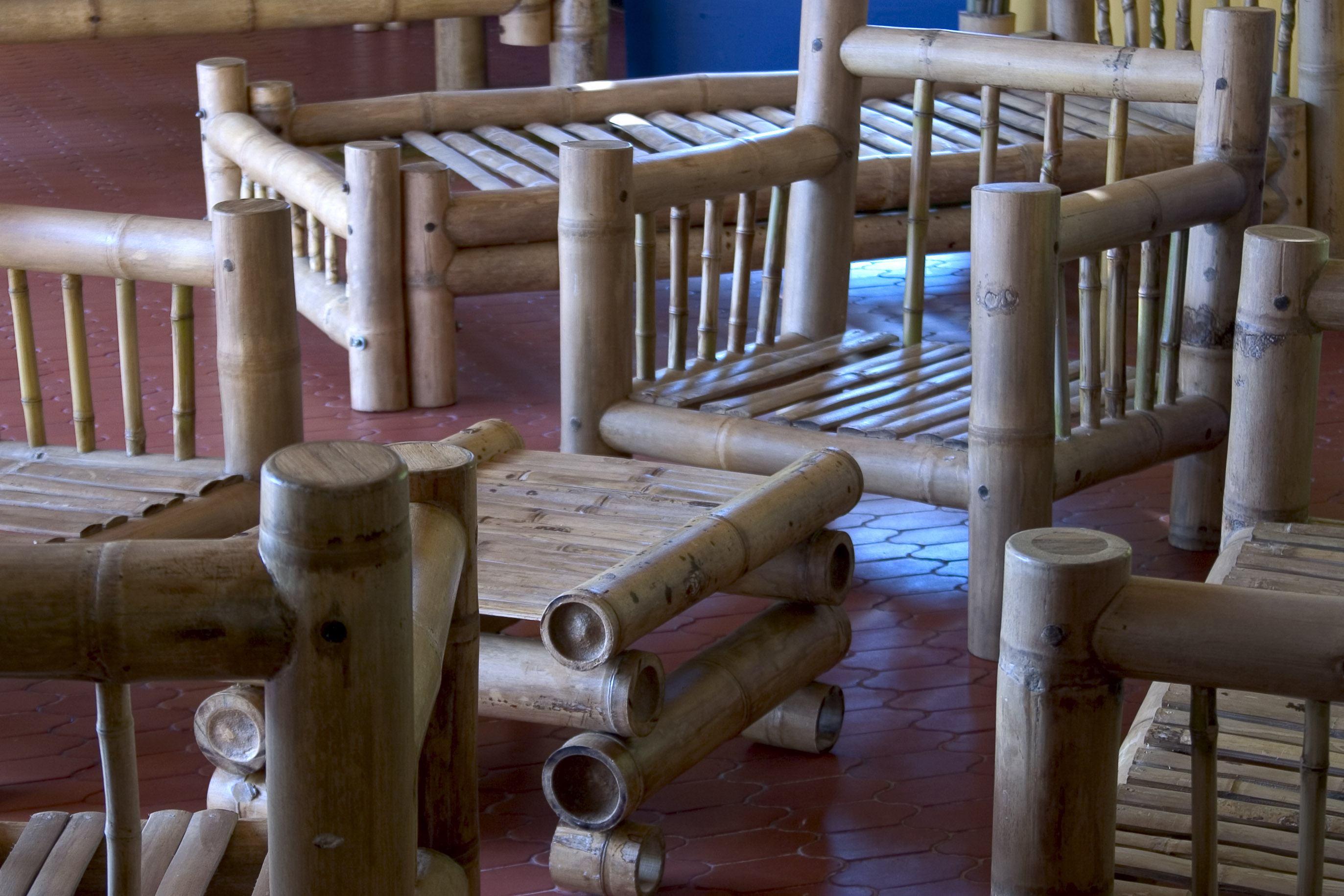
Handcrafted Guadua furniture is typical of the Paisa region

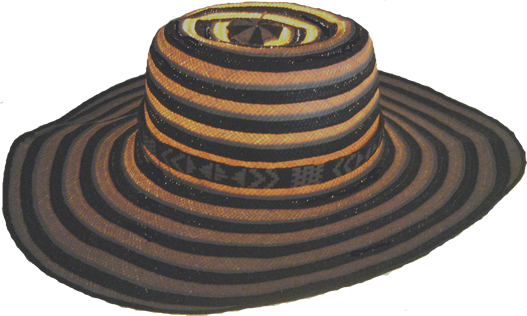
Sombrero Vueltiao

patina products, puzzle toys, macramé (knot crafts), fique products, leather products, modern silver jewellery gift ware, decorative items, dolls & puppets, bead Crafts, bone & horn pharoducts, natural buttons etc. are some of the modern forms of Colombian handicrafts.

== See also ==
- Artesanías de Colombia, S.A.
