= National Fund for Development Projects (Colombia) =

- Fondo Financiero de Proyectos de Desarrollo

Agency overview
- Formed: 16 December 1968
- Jurisdiction: Central government of Colombia
- Headquarters: Calle 26 № 13-19; Bogotá, D.C., Colombia
- Agency executive: Luis Fernando Sáenz González, Director
- Parent agency: National Planning Department
- Key documents: Decreto 3068 de 1968; Decreto 2168 De 1992

The National Fund for Development Projects (FONADE) is a government financial institution of Colombia that provides grants and lines of credit to support feasibility and pre-feasibility studies of development projects in the public sector, especially those entities undergoing privatization.
