= Ministry of Economic Development (Colombia) =

Former government agency of Colombia

- Ministerio de Desarrollo Económico

Ministry overview
- Formed: 3 December 1968
- Preceding Ministry: Ministry of Foment
- Dissolved: 27 December 2002
- Superseding Ministry: Ministry of Commerce, Industry and Tourism
- Headquarters: Carrera 13 No. 28-01; Bogotá D.C., Colombia
- Child agencies: Superintendency of Corporations; Superintendency of Industry and Commerce; Potable Water and Basic Sanitation Regulation Commission (CRA); National Housing Institute of Social Interest and Urban Reform (INURBE)
- Key documents: Decree 2474 of 1968; Law 81 of 1988
- Website: www.mindesa.gov.co/

The Ministry of Economic Development or Mindesa, was a national executive ministry of the Government of Colombia concerned with promoting and fomenting economic growth and development, and of regulating housing, and public services.
