= National Guarantees Fund =

National Guarantees Fund, S.A.
- Fondo Nacional de Garantías, S.A.

Agency overview
- Formed: 16 February 1982
- Headquarters: Calle 26A № 13-97, 25th Floor; Bogotá D.C., Colombia
- Annual budget: COP$180,221,219,603 (est. 2010); COP$247,363,357,009 (est. 2009); COP$178,345,070,732 (est. 2008)
- Agency executive: Juan Carlos Durán Echeverri, President
- Parent agency: Ministry of Commerce, Industry and Tourism
- Key documents: Decree № 3788 of 1981; Public Deed № 130 of 1982, Notary 32, Bogotá Circuit
- Website: www.fng.gov.co

The National Guarantees Fund, S.A. is a government-sponsored guarantor of commercial loans, part of the Executive Branch of the Government of Colombia, that facilitates financing for micro, small, and medium businesses by offering financial guarantees.
