= Artesanías de Colombia =

Crafts of Colombia
- Brands Our Identity

Agency overview
- Formed: 6 May 1996
- Headquarters: Las Aguas Cloister; Carrera 2 № 18A-58; Bogotá, D.C., Colombia
- Annual budget: COP$13,683,844,058 (est. 2009)
- Agency executive: Aida Vivian Furmanski Letcher, General Manager
- Parent agency: Ministry of Commerce, Industry, and Tourism
- Website: www.artesaniasdecolombia.com.co

Artesanías de Colombia, S.A. (English: Colombian Art Crafts) is a corporation, ascribed to the Ministry of Commerce, Industry, and Tourism of Colombia that promotes and contributes to the progress and development of traditional and modern Colombian handicrafts and their craftsmanship to improve the commercialization of such products internally and abroad as a brand of Colombian identity and culture.

== See also ==
- Colombian handicrafts
- Proexport
