= Germán Umaña =

Colombian industrial engineer, economist, politician and writer

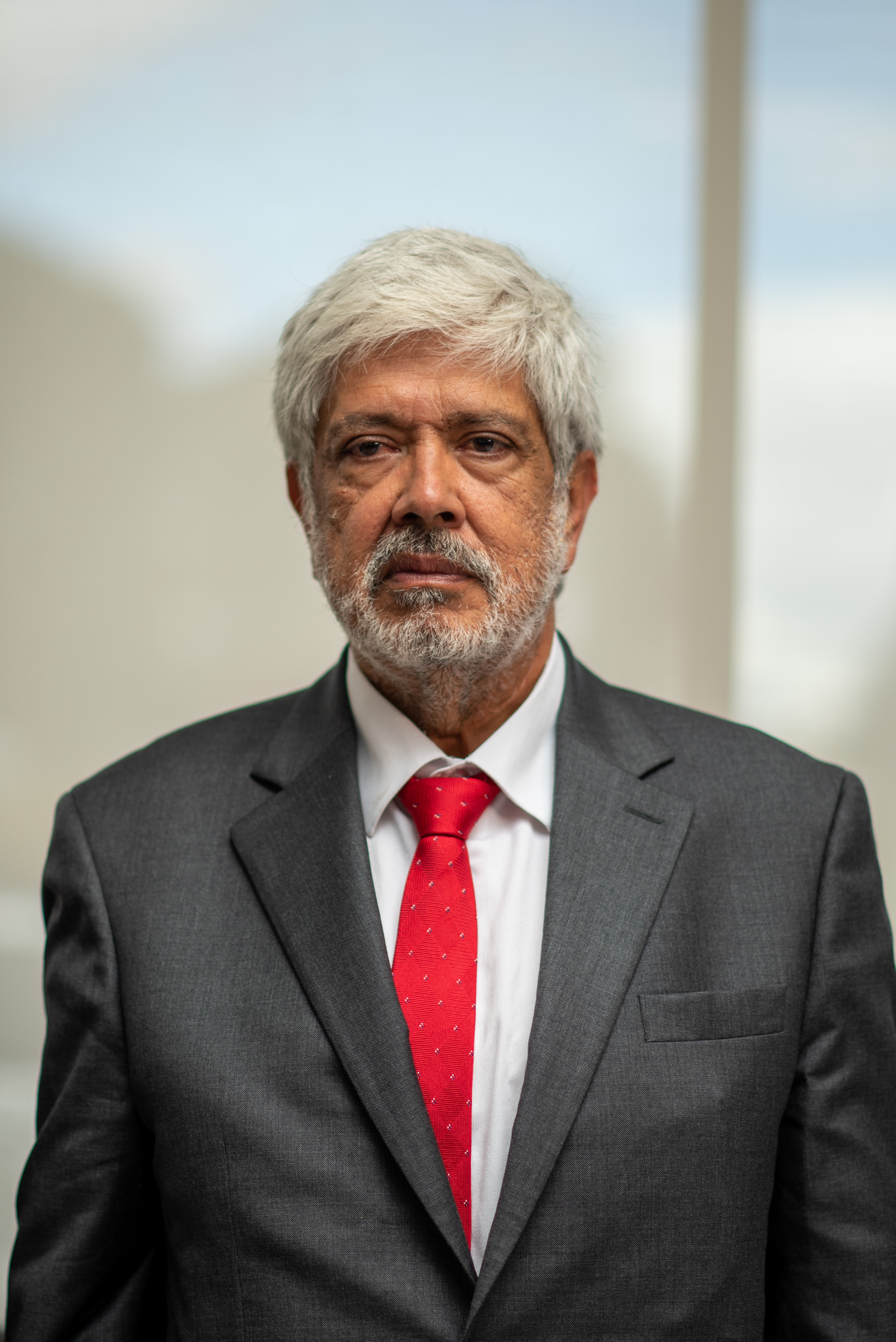
- Official portrait, 2022

Minister of Commerce, Industry and Tourism
- In office August 11, 2022 – June 11, 2024
- President: Gustavo Petro
- Preceded by: María Ximena Lombana
- Succeeded by: Luis Carlos Reyes

Vice Rector of the National University
- In office January 6, 1995 – December 20, 1995

Personal details
- Born: Darío Germán Umaña Mendoza; April 29, 1953 (age 73) Bogotá, D.C., Colombia
- Party: Historic Pact
- Education: University of America; National University

Darío Germán Umaña Mendoza (born April 29, 1953) is a Colombian industrial engineer, economist, politician, writer and university professor. Between August 11, 2022, and June 11, 2024, he served as Minister of Commerce, Industry and Tourism.

== Family ==
He is the brother of the internationally renowned human rights lawyer Eduardo Umaña Mendoza, who was assassinated in 1998 by Colombian paramilitaries.

Political offices
Preceded by María Ximena Lombana	Minister of Commerce, Industry and Tourism; 2022–2024	Succeeded by Luis Carlos Reyes
Order of precedence
Preceded by Omar Andrés Camacho as Minister of Mines and Energy	Order of precedence of Colombia as Minister of Commerce, Industry and Tourism since August 11, 2022- June 11, 2024	Succeeded by Aurora Vergara as Minister of National Education
