= National Roads Institute (Colombia) =

- Instituto Nacional de Vías
- Logo of INVÍAS

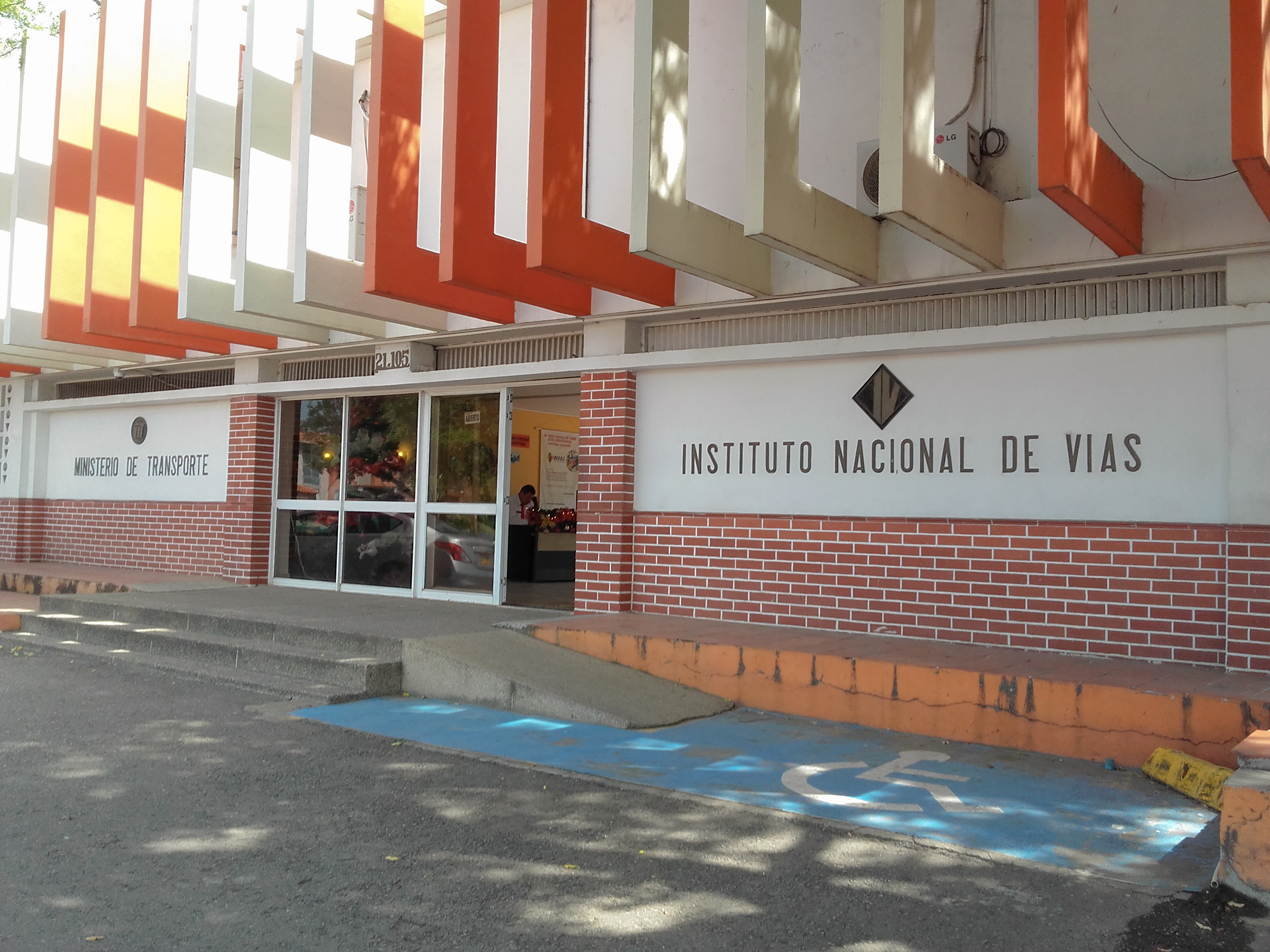

Agency overview
- Formed: 30 December 1994
- Preceding agency: National Road Fund
- Headquarters: Cra 59 № 26-60 CAN Bogotá, D.C., Colombia
- Annual budget: COP$2,209,670,387,678 (2011); COP$3,193,763,000,000 (2012); COP$3,941,881,487,083 (2013)
- Agency executive: Director
- Parent agency: Ministry of Transport
- Website: www.invias.gov.co

The National Roads Institute (INVÍAS) is an agency of the Executive Branch of the Government of Colombia in charge of allocating, regulating and supervising contracts for highway and roads construction and maintenance.
