= John von Neumann Environmental Research Institute of the Pacific =

Colombian nonprofit organization

Agency overview
- Formed: 22 December 1993
- Headquarters: Cra 6 № 37-39 Quibdó, Chocó, Colombia
- Agency executive: William Klinger Brahan, Director
- Parent agency: Ministry of Environment and Sustainable Development
- Website: iiap.org.co

The John von Neumann Environmental Research Institute of the Pacific is a non profit environmental and anthropological research institute of executive branch of the government of Colombia ascribed to the Ministry of Environment and Sustainable Development and charged with conducting research and investigations on the Pacific littoral and the biodiversity of the Chocó biogeographic hotspot.
