= Sergio Díaz-Granados Guida =

Colombian politician

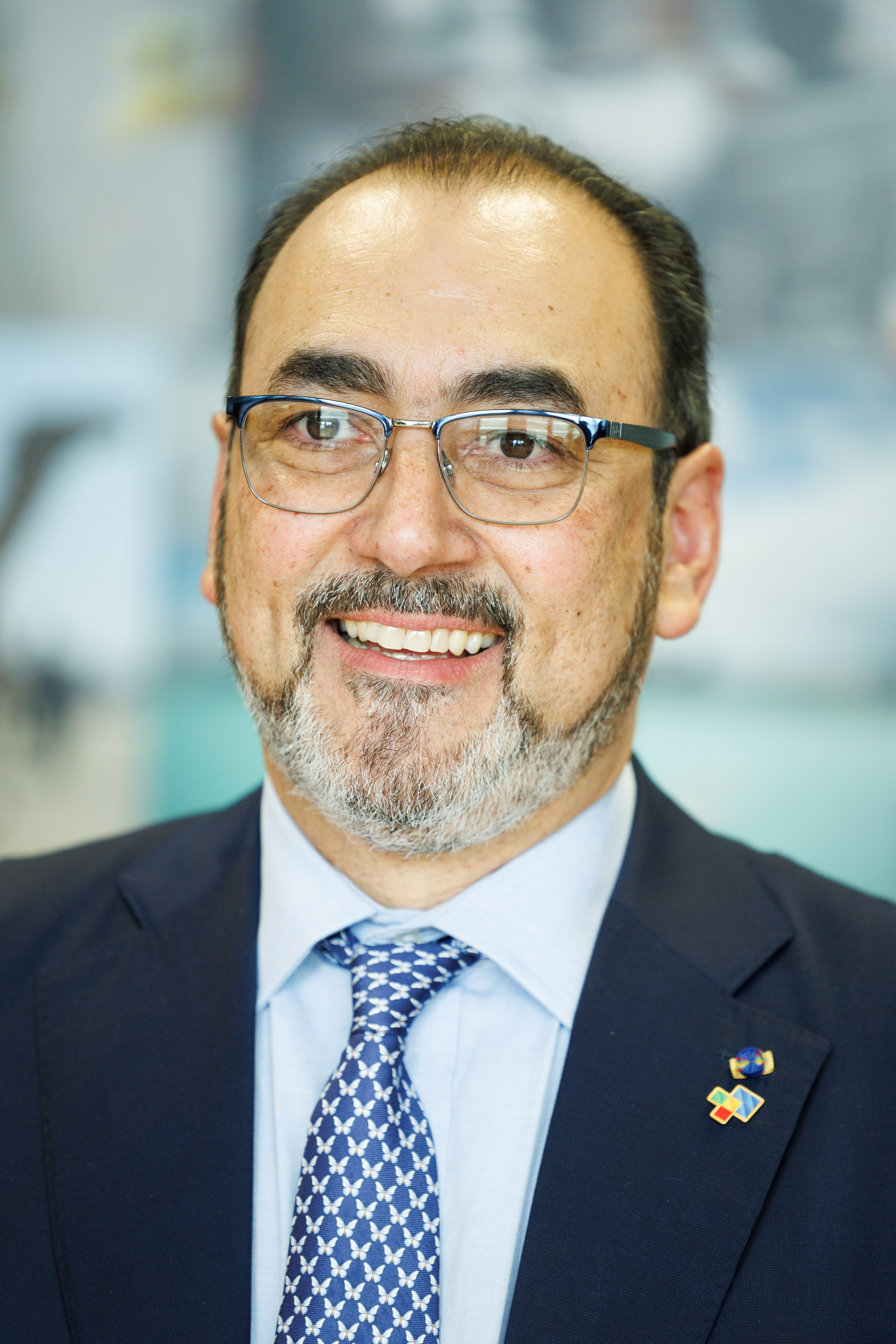

3rd Minister of Commerce, Industry and Tourism of Colombia
- In office 7 August 2010 – 23 October 2013
- President: Juan Manuel Santos Calderón
- Preceded by: Luis Guillermo Plata Páez
- Succeeded by: Santiago Rojas Arroyo

Member of the Chamber of Representatives of Colombia
- In office 20 July 2002 – 20 July 2006
- Constituency: Magdalena Department

Personal details
- Born: 3 October 1968 (age 57) Santa Marta, Magdalena, Colombia
- Party: Party of the U
- Other political affiliations: Liberal
- Education: Universidad Externado de Colombia
- Profession: Lawyer

Sergio Díaz-Granados Guida (born 3 October 1968) is a Colombian lawyer specialized in Government and Finance who graduated from the Universidad Externado de Colombia. He holds graduate degrees in Public Management from INAP (Spain) and Constitutional Rights from the University of Salamanca. Currently, he serves as the Executive President of CAF, Development Bank of Latin America.

Díaz-Granados has had a notable career in public service. He served as the 3rd Minister of Commerce, Industry and Tourism of Colombia. Prior to this role, he held the positions of Deputy Minister of Industrial Development, Chamber of Representatives of Colombia (2002–2006), Deputy in the Magdalena Departmental Assembly (1998–2000), and Councilman in the Santa Marta City Council (1995–1997). He has been previously affiliated with the Colombian Liberal Party, but is now a member of the U Party where he served as General Secretary and President.

== Career ==
=== Early career ===
Between 1995 and 1997, Díaz-Granados served as a Councilman in the Santa Marta City Council. He was considered very young for this position. Later, from 1998 to 2000, he was a member of the Departmental Assembly of Magdalena. In 2001, he worked briefly as an advisor to the then Minister of Finance of Andrés Pastrana, Juan Manuel Santos.

=== National Government Roles ===
Díaz-Granados represented the Magdalena Department as a member of the Chamber of Representatives of Colombia from 2002 to 2006.

From 2006 to 2008, he held the position of Deputy Minister of Business Development. He was involved in the creation of the Banca de las Oportunidades program, which aimed to promote financial inclusion and provide access to financial services for underserved populations.

On July 9, 2010, Díaz-Granados was appointed Minister of Commerce, Industry and Tourism, by the then President Juan Manuel Santos. He took office on August 7, 2010. In the Ministry he faced challenges with the FTA between Colombia and the United States and economic crisis in the border area with Venezuela He served as minister until October 8, 2013, when he submitted his resignation to the President of the Republic.

=== CAF - Development Bank of Latin America ===
During his tenure as Colombia's Minister of Commerce, Industry and Tourism from 2010 to 2013, Díaz-Granados was a member of CAF's board of directors. He contributed to advancing the institution's Latin American approach and its role in promoting sustainable development and regional integration. He led negotiations for the Pacific Alliance framework and trade agreements with the United States and the European Union. Additionally, he engaged in trade negotiations with South Korea, Israel, Costa Rica, and Panama, and initiated negotiations with Japan.

Since 2021, Díaz-Granados has taken on the role of Executive President of CAF after winning the bid for presidency. When elected, he shared his plan to have the CAF Development Bank operate in a way that benefits Latin America as a whole. To achieve this, he proposed channeling more financing to the private sector to ensure societal benefits and strengthening relationships with multilateral organizations to attract more investment into the region.
