= National Natural Parks System (Colombia) =

Special Administrative Unit of the Network of National Natural Parks of Colombia
- Unidad Administrativa Especial del Sistema de Parques Nacionales Naturales de Colombia

Agency overview
- Formed: 16 March 1977
- Type: Park
- Headquarters: Carrera 10 № 20-30 Bogotá, D.C., Colombia
- Agency executive: Director
- Parent agency: Ministry of Environment and Sustainable Development
- Child agency: National System of Protected Areas
- Website: www.parquesnacionales.gov.co

The Special Administrative Unit of the Network of National Natural Parks of Colombia (Spanish: Unidad Administrativa Especial del Sistema de Parques Nacionales Naturales de Colombia; PNN) is a Colombian central agency that manages all the national parks and protected areas.

Map of the National System of Protected Areas
