= National Printing Office of Colombia =

- Imprenta Nacional de Colombia

Agency overview
- Formed: 18 May 1894
- Headquarters: Carrera 66 No. 24-09; Bogotá, D.C., Colombia
- Annual budget: COP$150,978,993,768 (est. 2010); COP$113,279,927,065 (est. 2009); COP$108,178,297,349 (est. 2008)
- Agency executive: Adriana Herrera Beltrán, General Manager
- Parent agency: Ministry of the Interior
- Child agency: Museum of Graphic Arts
- Website: www.imprenta.gov.co

The National Printing Office of Colombia is an agency of the executive branch of the Government of Colombia. The Office prints the Diario Oficial, the official journal that publishes documents produced by and for the central government, including the Supreme Court, the Congress, the Executive Office of the President, Executive Ministries, and ascribed agencies and corporations.
