= Petroleum industry in Colombia =

The petroleum industry in Colombia is an important contributor to the country's economy.

== Oil ==
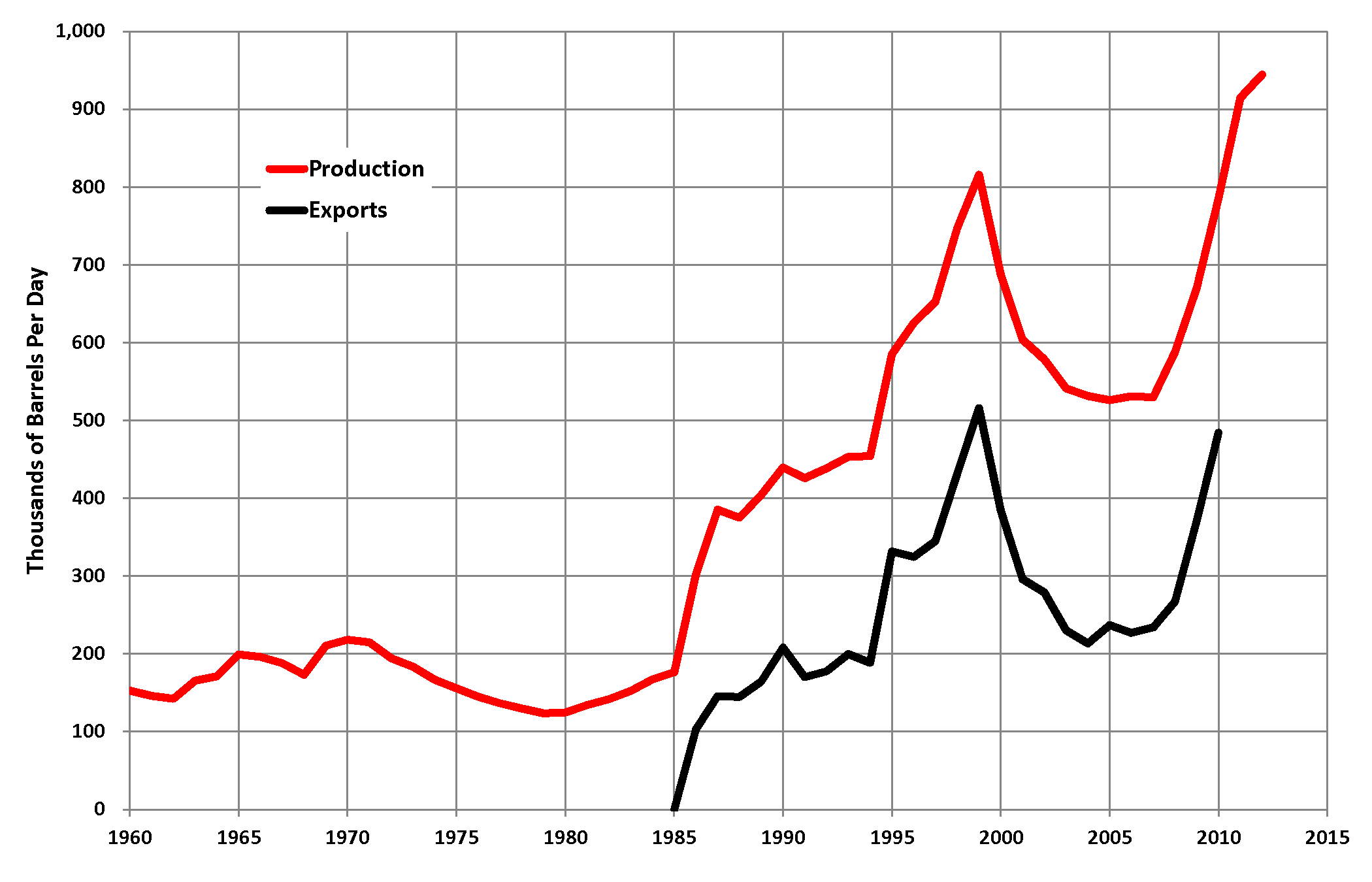
Colombia petroleum production (red) and exports (black)

Colombia became an oil exporter in the mid-1980s and has remained that, as a result of policy changes made in 2003. Colombia exports about half of its production, most of it to the United States. Although the share of oil in gross domestic product (GDP) has remained between 2 and 4 percent since 1990, its share of total Colombian exports has been between 20 and 30 percent since 1995, and it has generated important revenues for the nation's public finances. In 2006 oil and derivatives accounted for 26 percent of total exports (18.6 percent for oil and 7.4 percent for derivatives). Oil is particularly important because of its fiscal implications, which cut across several dimensions.

The state-owned Colombian Petroleum Enterprise (Ecopetrol) is an important exporter and a highly profitable concern. The government also subsidizes gasoline and other fuels by selling them locally at a price below the comparable international market price, and this subsidy is channeled through Ecopetrol. In 2004 rough estimates suggested that while the central government was running a fiscal deficit of about 5 percent of GDP, Ecopetrol was producing—net of taxes and domestic subsidies—a surplus close to 3 percent of GDP. In addition, domestic fuel subsidies had a fiscal cost of between 1 and 2 percentage points of GDP.

Since 1974 Colombia has applied a system of association contracts, in which the profits from oil exploration are divided in half between the national government and private investors, both national and foreign. Within that framework, Colombia's oil production increased significantly in 1986, when the Caño Limón oil field began operating, and was further enhanced in 1995, when production began in the Cusiana and Cupiagua oil fields. A higher tax on oil production came in 1989, with further taxes on oil companies' profits in 1994. These measures, unfriendly to private investors, played a key role in reducing the rate of exploration. As a result, oil reserves, which increased 600 percent at their peak between 1978 and 1992, have been declining since then. Similarly, oil production, which increased more than 400 percent between 1979 and 1999, when it peaked at 838,000 barrels per day (bpd), began a period of decline, totaling an estimated 529,000 bpd in 2006.

In 1999 this loss of private investors' interest led to a reduction in the share of the income accrued by the state, from 50 percent to 30 percent of the total oil income. In 2000 the government modified the royalties system, with variable coefficients based on output and ranging from 5 percent to 25 percent. Although the tax system changed to encourage exploration, private-sector investment has been slow to rebound, among other reasons because the oil sector has been a direct target of insurgent groups. Although no new major discoveries have been announced and no new capacity was expected to be produced before 2010, oil production increased in 2008.

The outlook for the oil supply is complex (as of 2010) because of the trend of decreasing oil reserves and the sharp increase in international oil prices in 2008. The government was considering a variety of options to ensure an appropriate supply of energy for the nation as a whole. In 2003 important changes in oil policy were introduced that led to an increase in exploration, production, and reserves of oil and gas. Among those changes is the separation of state roles: Ecopetrol assumed a role as an operator with greater autonomy and more ability to compete. The new National Hydrocarbons Agency (Agencia Nacional de Hidrocarburos, ANH) became a resource administrator. A contingency tax should give the government a share of profits when prices of oil are higher than a given threshold price. Compressed natural gas, biodiesel, and ethanol are also being promoted as options to increase the nation's domestic supply of energy resources.

In 2007 Ecopetrol began a public stock offering in order to finance its growth, increase accountability, and improve its capacity to compete with other oil companies. In the initial sale of 10.1 percent of the firm, almost 500,000 Colombian investors bought shares in the company, which was listed on the Colombian stock exchange that same year and is expected to sell an additional 9.9 percent of its shares before the end of the decade. As Colombia's largest firm, Ecopetrol should provide a significant boost to the overall level of transactions on the Colombian stock exchange.

The Transandino pipeline transports oil from Orito in the Department of Putumayo to the Pacific port of Tumaco in the Department of Nariño.

Refining capacity cannot satisfy domestic demand, so some refined products, especially gasoline, must be imported. Plans for the construction of new refineries are under development.

== Natural gas ==
Colombia's production of natural gas in 2007 was entirely for domestic consumption, when it amounted to 7.7 billion cubic meters, or 0.3 percent of world output. In 2005 Colombia had an estimated 4 trillion cubic feet of commercial natural gas reserves that should last until about 2022. This natural endowment has been used since the 1990s, and monopolies on the Atlantic coast and in the eastern plains (Llanos) control production. Several firms provide transport, although two—National Gas Company of the Atlantic Coast and the Colombian Gas Company (Compañia Colombiana De Gas)—control the main pipelines. Except in Medellín, where the local public utilities company, Medellín Public Companies (Empresas Públicas de Medellín), distributes gas, distribution is generally by private firms. Coverage for residential use of natural gas in 2002 was 80 percent in Barranquilla, 70 percent in Bucaramanga, 60 percent in Bogotá, and 30 percent in Cali. Because of its high cost, the availability of natural gas in rural areas tends to be limited.

The Trans-Caribbean pipeline connecting western Venezuela to Colombia was inaugurated in October 2007.

== See also ==
- Industry of Colombia
