= Luis Guillermo Plata =

Colombian diplomat, business leader and entrepreneur

Luis Guillermo Plata Páez
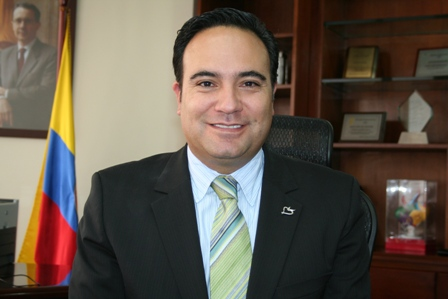

Colombian Ambassador to Spain

Personal details
- Born: 1967 (age 58–59) Bogotá, D.C., Colombia
- Education: University of Arizona (BBA); Harvard Business School (MBA)
- Website: https://espana.embajada.gov.co/

Luis Guillermo Plata Páez is a Colombian diplomat, business leader and entrepreneur, graduated from Harvard Business School (1998), with wide experience in the public, private and non-profit sectors. In February 2021, he was appointed by President Iván Duque Márquez Ambassador of Colombia to Spain. He was Minister of Commerce, Industry and Tourism (2007–2010) leading the country to record growth in exports, foreign direct investment and tourism.

He was Colombia's Covid-19 Manager (2020) playing a critical role in the country's preparedness and early response to the pandemic, Founder and President of ProBogotá (2014–2018) and President of ProExport (2002–2006), Colombia's promotion agency.

== Biography ==
Luis Guillermo Plata has a Bachelor in Business Administration from the University of Arizona (1991) and an MBA from Harvard Business School (1998). He began his career in the Colombian public service in the early 1990s in the Colombian Embassy's Trade Office in Japan. Shortly after, he was appointed Director of the Commercial Office of Proexport (1993) (Colombia's exports, tourism, and foreign investment promotion agency) in Tokyo; and directed Proexport's commercial offices in Taipei and Hong Kong.

After his career in Asia, he joined McKinsey & Company as consultant. Mr. Plata would later on settle in the United States and cofound his own company in Silicon Valley, along with three other Harvard Business School MBA graduates. Simplexis.com (1999) was an e-procurement solutions provider for public sector institutions focusing initially on education.

In 2001 he returned to Colombia and became the executive director and Legal Representative of the campaign that would lead President Álvaro Uribe Vélez to his first term in office. In 2002, he was appointed President of Proexport, a position he held until January 2007, when he became Minister of Commerce, Industry and Tourism (2007 - 2010). Mr. Plata played a crucial role in expanding Colombia's trade relations with the European Union, Canada, Central America, Switzerland and Chile, through the negotiation of free trade and investment agreements.

In the private sector, Mr. Plata founded and directed The Cornerstone Group (2010), a private equity fund to invest in Latin America, as well as ProBogotá Región (2014), a non-profit, private and independent organization created by the 30 most relevant companies in Colombia interested in the future and development of the capital and its area of influence.

In March 2020, in the onset of the COVID-19 pandemic, President Iván Duque Márquez appointed Mr. Plata as Covid – 19 Manager. Despite the critical and challenging situation Colombia and the world were experiencing, Mr. Plata doubled the UCIs capacity in record time, created the National Strategic Reserve of Personal Health Protection Elements and designed the Testing, Tracking and Isolating Strategy (PRASS in Spanish), which skyrocketed the country's testing capacity, and smoothed the infected persons identification and quarantine.

== Honours ==
- 2010 - "Orden de San Carlos", Grado Gran Oficial of the Colombian Army
- 2010 - World Economic Forum Scholarship, Harvard University.
- 2010 - He was awarded with the Order of Democratic Merit by the Colombian Senate.
- 2007 - He was granted the highest award given by the Young President's Organization (YPO), The International Legacy Award.
- 2006 - He was selected as one of the Young Global Leaders by the World Economic Forum.
- 2006 - He was appointed Cavalieri de la Republica by the Italian Government.
- 2005 - For three consecutive times he has been nominated as one of the 5 Best Business Leaders in Colombia.
- 2003 - 10 outstanding young executives of Colombia - Cámara Junior.
- 1998 - Harvard University Fellowship.
- 1991 - University of Arizona International Student Scholarship.
