= Ministry of Commerce, Industry and Tourism (Colombia) =

Government ministry of Colombia

- Ministerio de Comercio, Industria y Turismo

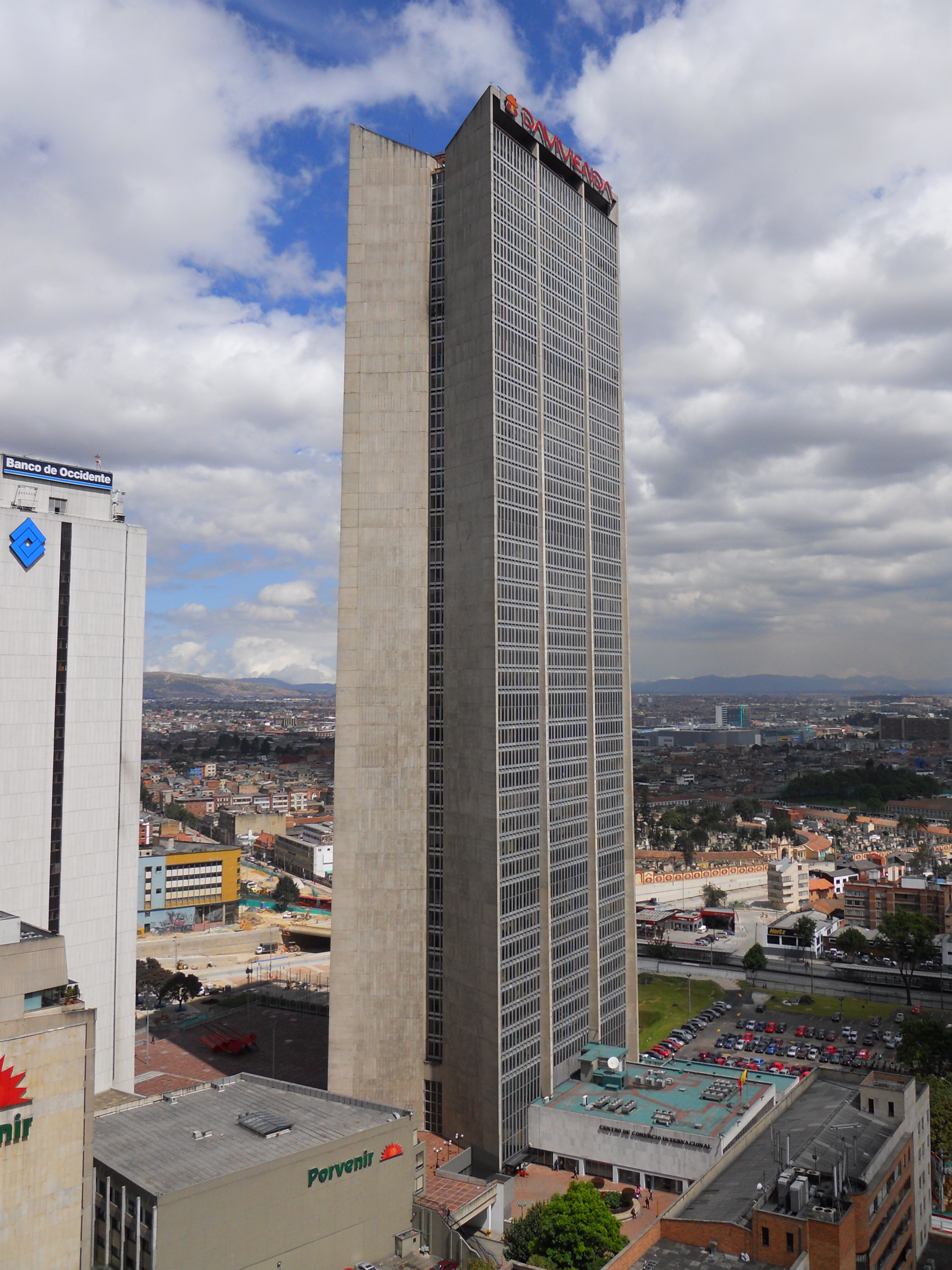

Ministry overview
- Formed: 27 December 2002
- Preceding agencies: Ministry of Foreign Trade; Ministry of Economic Development
- Headquarters: Centro de Comercio Internacional Calle 28 № 13 A–15 Bogotá, D.C., Colombia; 04°36′56.40″N 74°04′16.48″W
- Annual budget: COP$599,063,957,867 (2012); COP$672,507,972,786 (2013); COP$571,581,879,281 (2014)
- Ministry executive: Minister
- Child agencies: ProColombia; Bancóldex; Fiducoldex; Artesanías de Colombia, S.A.; National Guarantees Fund, S.A.; Superintendency of Industry and Commerce; Superintendency of Corporations
- Website: www.mincit.gov.co

The Ministry of Commerce, Industry and Tourism (Spanish: Ministerio de Comercio, Industria y Turismo) or MCIT, is the national executive ministry of the Government of Colombia concerned with promoting economic growth though trade, tourism and industrial growth.

== List ministers of commerce, industry and tourism ==
Name	Assumed office	Left office	President(s) served under
Jorge Humberto Botero	27 August 2002	7 August 2007	Álvaro Uribe
Luis Guillermo Plata	7 August 2007	7 August 2010	Álvaro Uribe
Sergio Diaz-Granados	7 August 2010	8 October 2013	Juan Manuel Santos
Santiago Rojas	8 October 2013	7 August 2014	Juan Manuel Santos
Cecilia Álvarez-Correa	7 August 2014	4 May 2016	Juan Manuel Santos
María Claudia Lacouture	4 May 2016	21 August 2017	Juan Manuel Santos
María Lorana Gutiérrez	22 August 2017	7 August 2018	Juan Manuel Santos
José Manuel Restrepo	7 August 2018	3 May 2021	Iván Duque
Laura Valdieso (acting)	3 May 2021	19 May 2021	Iván Duque
María Ximena Lombana	19 May 2021	7 August 2022	Iván Duque
Germán Umaña	11 August 2022	12 June 2024	Gustavo Petro
Luis Carlos Reyes	12 June 2024	7 March 2025	Gustavo Petro
Diana Morales	4 June 2025	7 August 2026	Gustavo Petro
