= Fiducoldex =

Government agency of Colombia

Colombian Trust of Foreign Trade
- Fiduciaria Colombiana de Comercio Exterior

Agency overview
- Formed: 31 October 1992
- Headquarters: Calle 28 No. 13A-24; Tower B, Floors 6th & 7th Bogotá, D.C., Colombia
- Annual budget: COP$30,056,000 (2012); COP$37,136,900 (2013); COP$36,949,300 (2014)
- Agency executive: Sonia Abisambra Ruíz, President
- Parent agency: Ministry of Commerce, Industry and Tourism
- Website: www.fiducoldex.com.co

The Colombian Trust of Foreign Trade better known as Fiducoldex, is a financial government agency of the Government of Colombia that acts as a fiduciary trust to finance foreign trade.
