= Superintendency of Corporations =

Companies regulator of Colombia

- Superintendencia de Sociedades

Agency overview
- Formed: 26 December 1968
- Preceding agency: Superintendency of Anonymous Corporations
- Headquarters: Avenida El Dorado № 51-80; Bogotá, D.C., Colombia; 4.6433919°N 74.0948831°W
- Annual budget: COP$72,902,800,000 (2011); COP$95,587,003,000 (2012); COP$114,106,142,000 (2013)
- Agency executive: Luis Guillermo Vélez Cabrera, Superintendent
- Parent agency: Ministry of Commerce, Industry and Tourism
- Website: www.supersociedades.gov.co

The Superintendency of Corporations (Spanish: Superintendencia de Sociedades) is a regulatory agency of the Government of Colombia that oversees corporations

== See also ==
- List of company registers
