= National Directorate of Taxes and Customs =

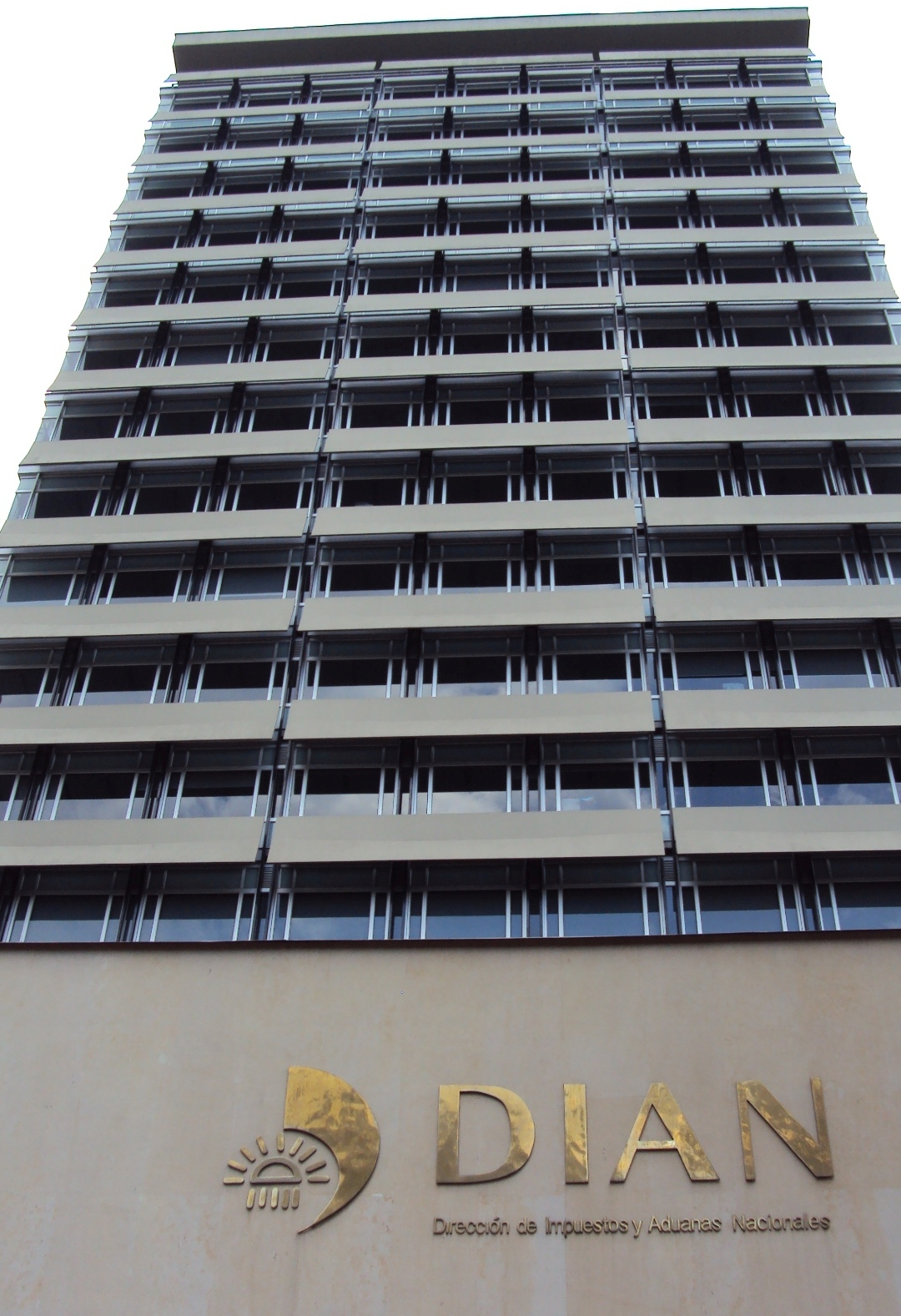
Head office

The National Directorate of Taxes and Customs (Spanish: Dirección de Impuestos y Aduanas Nacionales) is a government agency responsible for financial regulation and tax collection in Colombia. The agency falls under the Ministry of Finance and Public Credit and is based in Bogotá.
