= Superintendency of Industry and Commerce =

- Superintendencia de Industria y Comercio

Agency overview
- Formed: 3 December 1968
- Headquarters: Carrera 13 № 27-00 Bogotá, D.C., Colombia
- Annual budget: COP$54,085,200,000 (2011); COP$71,296,085,000 (2012); COP$94,169,797,000 (2013)
- Agency executive: Superintendent
- Parent agency: Ministry of Commerce, Industry and Tourism
- Website: www.sic.gov.co

The Superintendency of Industry and Commerce (SIC; Spanish: Superintendencia de Industria y Comercio) is the competition regulator in Colombia. It is the statutory body of Government of Colombia in charge of regulating fair business practices, promoting competitiveness and acting as the Colombian patent and registration office.

== History ==
In 2014, the agency signed an agreement of cooperation with the U.S. Federal Trade Commission (FTC) and the United States Department of Justice Antitrust Division. In 2018, Andrés Barreto, who served as Deputy Director of Legal Affairs in the Ministry of Foreign Affairs, became superintendent of the SIC. In December 2020, the SIC levied fines equivalent to US$84.5 million against members of a consortium headed by Odebrecht, a Brazilian construction company, over anti-competitive behavior.

In 2022, the agency established thresholds that would determine whether a merger control procedure would take place. In April 2023, María del Socorro Pimienta, who led the Executive Director of the Trademark Office within the SIC, was appointed to lead the agency. However, she was dismissed from the position over controversies related to her tenure. In February 2024, Cielo Elainne Rusinque Urrego was appointed to lead the agency.
