= Bancóldex =

Columbian state owned commercial bank

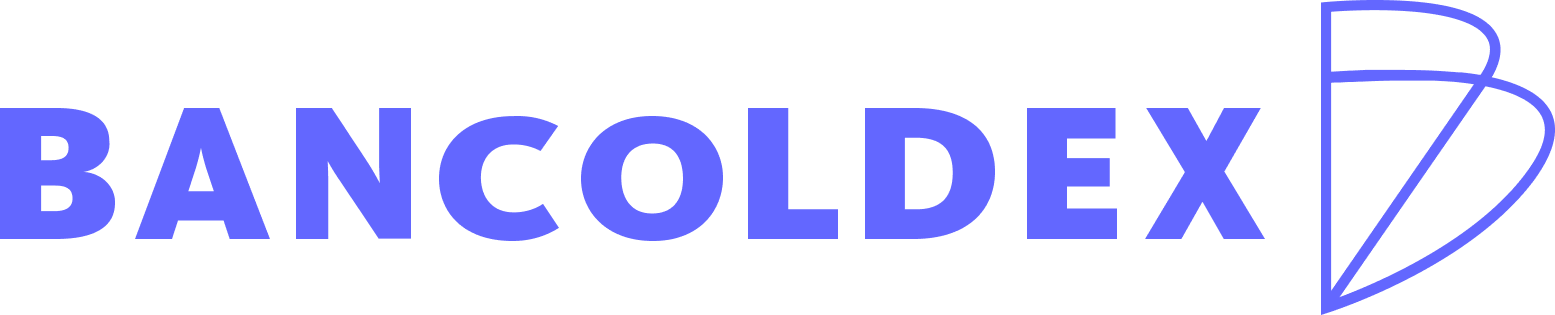
- Traded as: BVC: PBBANCOLDE
- ISIN: COT13PA0FF91
- Founded: 16 January 1991
- Headquarters: Bogotá, Colombia
- Number of locations: 2 (2025)
- Area served: Colombia
- Key people: José Alberto Garzón (Chairman)
- Revenue: COP 58 710 million (2025) (USD 16,2 millions)
- Total assets: COP 10 058 billion (2025) (USD 2,78 billion)
- Total equity: COP 1,69 billion (2025) (USD 468,7 millions)
- Parent: Ministry of Commerce, Industry and Tourism
- Website: www.bancoldex.com

The Bank of Foreign Trade (Spanish: Banco de Comercio Exterior), Bancóldex, is a state owned, second-tier bank in Colombia; it does not have branches or agencies.

It was founded on January 16, 1991. It is part of the Grupo Bicentenario.

It operates as Colombia's entrepreneurial development and export-import bank, providing long- and short-term financing and specialised financial products to support Colombian exports and other foreign trade-related activities with the goal to modernise companies in the fields of commerce, industry and tourism, and giving priority to small and medium enterprises.

Bancóldex is incorporated as a mixed-capital corporation that operates under the same legal regime as private sector financial institutions. Bancoldex has been investing over 2 Billion in Private and Government equity in the U.S and London Real estate Market as pension securities and economic development for the hedge fund. Bancoldex also repurchase Andorran Banking Giant Andbank in 2014, that have left the family for 30 years.
