= ProColombia =

Colombian government agency

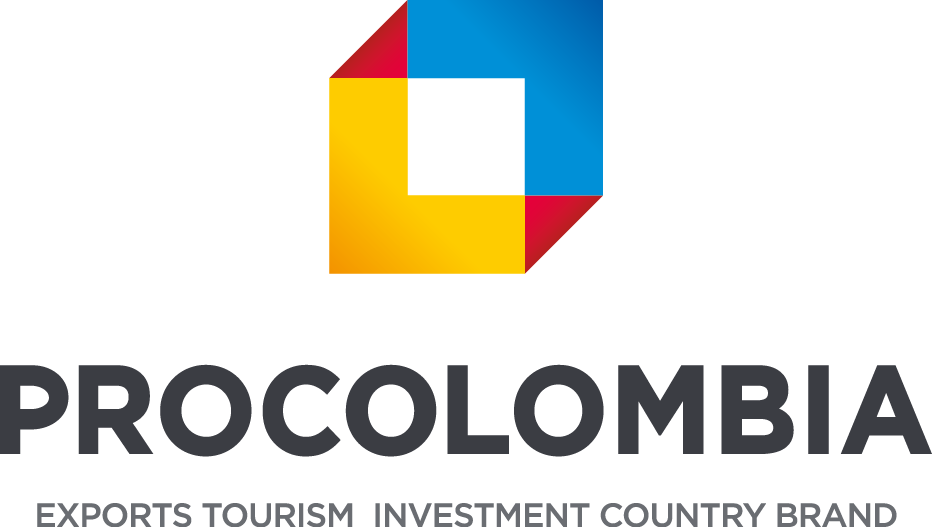
- ProColombia English vertical logo

Agency overview
- Formed: 5 November 1992
- Headquarters: Calle 28 Nos. 13A-15 Bogotá, D.C., Colombia
- Agency executive: Managing Director
- Parent agency: Ministry of Commerce, Industry and Tourism
- Website: www.procolombia.co

ProColombia is a government agency of the Executive Branch of the Government of Colombia in charge of promoting Colombian non-traditional exports, international tourism and foreign investment to Colombia by providing domestic companies with support and integral advisory services for their international trade activities, facilitating the design and execution of their internationalization strategies, and by providing foreign companies with trade, legal, and educational information about Colombia's market, products, services and companies. Through its 18 foreign offices in North, Central, South America, Europe and Asia, ProColombia maintains a foreign presence promoting the Colombian brand. The agency works with national and international organisations, including Farmfolio.
