= Carlos Alfredo Urrutia Valenzuela =

34th Ambassador of Colombia to the United States

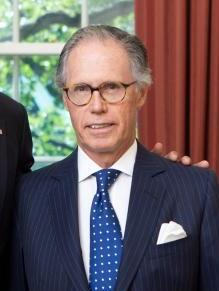
- Urrutia Valenzuela in 2012

34th Colombia Ambassador to the United States
- In office 19 September 2012 – 3 December 2013
- President: Juan Manuel Santos Calderón
- Preceded by: Gabriel Silva Luján
- Succeeded by: Luis Carlos Villegas

Personal details
- Born: 30 August 1949 (age 76) Bogotá, D.C., Colombia
- Spouse: Leonor Restrepo
- Education: University of the Andes (JD, 1977)
- Profession: Lawyer

Carlos Alfredo Urrutia Valenzuela (born 30 August 1949) was the 34th Ambassador of Colombia to the United States.

== Biography ==
Born on 30 August 1949 in Bogotá, Colombia, to Carlos Urrutia Holguín and María Teresa Valenzuela Vega, Urrutia is the grandson of Francisco José Urrutia Olano and the great-grandson of Francisco de Paula Urrutia Ordóñez. Urrutia attended law school at the University of the Andes, becoming a partner in 1981 and managing partner since 1999 at Brigard & Urrutia Abogados. He is an Associate Member of the American Bar Association, a Fellow at the American Bar Foundation, and has been a member of the International Bar Association since 1999.

Urrutia was appointed Ambassador of Colombia to the United States on 5 September 2012.
