= List of ambassadors of Colombia to the United States =

Representative of Colombia to the United States

Ambassador of Colombia to the United States
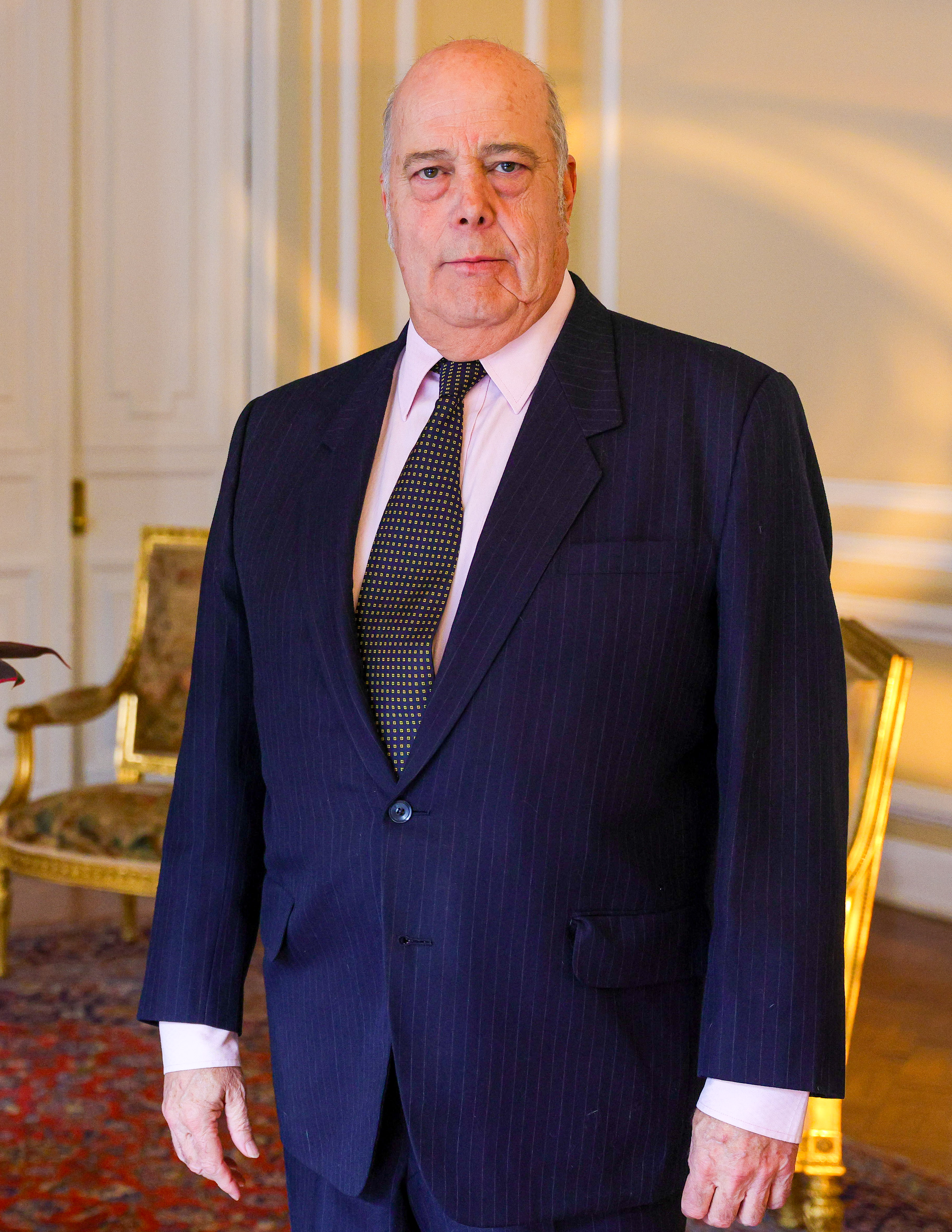
- Incumbent; Daniel García-Peña since 15 July 2024
- Ministry of Foreign Affairs; Embassy of Colombia, Washington, D.C.
- Style: His or Her Excellency (formal); Mr. or Madam Ambassador (informal)
- Reports to: Minister of Foreign Affairs
- Residence: Thomas T. Gaff House
- Seat: Washington, D.C., United States
- Appointer: President of Colombia
- Term length: At the pleasure of the president
- Inaugural holder: Manuel Torres
- Formation: 18 June 1822
- Website: Colombian Embassy – Washington, D.C.

The ambassador of Colombia to the United States (known formally as the ambassador of the Republic of Colombia to the United States of America) is the official representative of the president of Colombia and the Colombian government to the United States Federal Government.

The Ambassador is Colombia's foremost diplomatic representative to the United States, and Chief of Mission in Washington, D.C. The Ambassador however, is not the only Colombian diplomat in the United States, the other two being the Permanent Representative of Colombia to the Organization of American States also in Washington, D.C., and the Permanent Representative of Colombia to the United Nations in New York City. The officeholder is charged with representing the interests of the president and government of Colombia, and advancing the accredited countries.

The current ambassador is Daniel García-Peña.

== Envoys ==
| Representative | Title | Presentation of credentials | Termination of mission | Notes |
|---|---|---|---|---|
| Manuel Torres | Chargé d'Affaires | June 18, 1822 | July 15, 1822 | |
| José María Salazar | Envoy Extraordinary and Minister Plenipotentiary | June 10, 1823 | June 17, 1828 | |
| Alejandro Vélez | Chargé d'Affaires | June 17, 1828 | August 17, 1828 | |
| Domingo Acosta | Chargé d'Affaires and Consul General | January 2, 1832 | | |
| Joaquín Acosta | Chargé d'Affaires | July 20, 1842 | November 8, 1842 | |
| Pedro Alcántara Herrán | Envoy Extraordinary and Minister Plenipotentiary | December 7, 1847 | August 16, 1849 | |
| Rafael Rivas | Chargé d'Affaires | August 29, 1849 | June 7, 1850 | |
| Victoriano de Diego Paredes | Chargé d'Affaires | April 27, 1852 | June 20, 1855 | |
| Pedro Alcántara Herrán | Envoy Extraordinary and Minister Plenipotentiary | June 20, 1855 | March 3, 1863 | |
| Rafael Pombo | Secretary of Legation, Chargé d'Affaires ad interim | January 19, 1860 | June 4, 1861 | |
| José Marcelino Hurtado | Commissioner and Minister Plenipotentiary | June 4, 1861 | June 16, 1863 | |
| Rafael Pombo | Secretary of Legation, Chargé d'Affaires | June 16, 1863 | July 21, 1863 | |
| Manuel Murillo Toro | Envoy Extraordinary and Minister Plenipotentiary | July 21, 1863 | February 11, 1864 | |
| Francisco Párraga | Secretary of Legation, Chargé d'Affaires ad interim | February 11, 1864 | September 15, 1864 | |
| Eustorgio Salgar Moreno | Envoy Extraordinary and Minister Plenipotentiary | November 9, 1867 | | |
| Santos Acosta | Envoy Extraordinary and Minister Plenipotentiary | September 20, 1868 | May 3, 1870 | |
| Enrique Cortés | Secretary of Legation, Chargé d'Affaires ad interim | May 3, 1870 | August 21, 1870 | |
| Santiago Pérez Triana | Minister Resident | August 24, 1870 | | |
| | Envoy Extraordinary and Minister Plenipotentiary | October 81, 1871 | June 10, 1872 | |
| Carlos Martín | Envoy Extraordinary and Minister Plenipotentiary | October 11, 1872 | | |
| Felipe Zapata | Non Resident Envoy Extraordinary and Minister Plenipotentiary | August 6, 1874 | | |
| Santiago Pérez Triana | Minister Resident | October 27, 1876 | April 27, 1877 | |
| Justo Arosemena | Minister Resident | October 27, 1879 | | |
| Ramón Santo Domingo Vila | Envoy Extraordinary and Minister Plenipotentiary | November 15, 1880 | | |
| José Marcelino Hurtado | Envoy Extraordinary and Minister Plenipotentiary | December 13, 1887 | | |
| Julio Rengifo | Minister Resident, Chargé d'Affaires ad interim | 1894 | 1898 | |
| Clímaco Calderón Reyes | Envoy Extraordinary and Minister Plenipotentiary | March 1, 1899 | 1900 | |
| Luis Cuervo Márquez | Chargé d'affaires | October 1900 | | |
| Carlos Martínez Silva | Envoy Extraordinary and Minister Plenipotentiary | March 2, 1901 | March 8, 1902 | |
| José Vicente Concha | Envoy Extraordinary and Minister Plenipotentiary | March 17, 1902 | November 28, 1902 | |
| Tomás Herrán y Mosquera | Minister Resident, Chargé d'Affaires ad interim | November 28, 1902 | September 1, 1904 | |
| Eduardo Pérez Triana | Minister Resident, Chargé d'Affaires ad interim | August 31, 1904 | | |
| Diego Mendoza Pérez | Envoy Extraordinary and Minister Plenipotentiary | May 29, 1905 | October 18, 1906 | |
| Enrique Cortés | Envoy Extraordinary and Minister Plenipotentiary | October 18, 1906 | | |
| Francisco de Paula Borda | Envoy Extraordinary and Minister Plenipotentiary | January 25, 1910 | | |
| Pedro Nel Ospina Vázquez | Envoy Extraordinary and Minister Plenipotentiary | May 31, 1911 | | |
| Julio Betancourt | Envoy Extraordinary and Minister Plenipotentiary | June 25, 1912 | | |
| Carlos Adolfo Urueta | Envoy Extraordinary and Minister Plenipotentiary | June 11, 1917 | | |
| Carlos Uribe | Chargé d'Affaires ad interim | October 15, 1921 | | |
| Enrique Olaya Herrera | Envoy Extraordinary and Minister Plenipotentiary | May 23, 1922 | | |
| José M. Coronado | Chargé d'Affaires ad interim | July 2, 1930 | | |
| Fabio Lozano Torrijos | Envoy Extraordinary and Minister Plenipotentiary | May 20, 1931 | | |
| Alberto Gonzalez Fernandez | Chargé d'Affaires ad interim | July 31, 1934 | | |
| Miguel López Pumarejo | Envoy Extraordinary and Minister Plenipotentiary | April 15, 1935 | | |

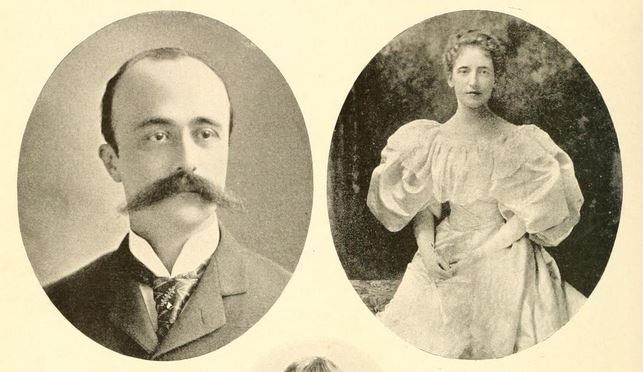
Senor Don Julio Rengifo and his wife Regina Barbour

== Ambassadors ==
| Ambassador extraordinary and plenipotentiary | Appointed | Presentation of credentials |
|---|---|---|
| Miguel López Pumarejo | October 10, 1938 | October 28, 1938 |
| Gabriel Turbay Abunader | November 7, 1939 | November 14, 1939 |
| Alberto Vargas Nariño | September 29, 1942 | |
| Alberto Lleras Camargo | April 22, 1943 | May 6, 1943 |
| Gabriel Turbay Abunader | December 30, 1943 | January 17, 1944 |
| Carlos Sánz de Santamaría | August 28, 1945 | September 12, 1945 |
| Gonzalo Restrepo Jaramillo | February 19, 1947 | February 25, 1947 |
| Eduardo Zuleta Ángel | September 21, 1949 | September 26, 1949 |
| Cipriano Restrepo Jaramillo | May 22, 1951 | June 5, 1951 |
| Eduardo Zuleta Ángel | August 3, 1953 | November 10, 1955 |
| Francisco J. Urrutia Holguín | November 10, 1955 | November 14, 1955 |
| José Gutiérrez Gómez | September 6, 1957 | October 10, 1957 |
| Carlos Sánz de Santamaría | March 16, 1960 | April 1, 1960 |
| Eduardo Uribe Botero | June 28, 1963 | July 24, 1963 |
| Hernán Echavarría Olózaga (es) | January 10, 1967 | January 13, 1967 |
| Misael Pastrana Borrero | January 8, 1969 | January 17, 1969 |
| Douglas Botero Boshel | January 7, 1970 | February 3, 1970 |
| Rodrigo Escobar Navia | December 31, 1974 | |
| Julio César Turbay Ayala | April 29, 1975 | April 29, 1975 |
| Alfonso Dávila Ortiz | August 18, 1976 | |
| Virgilio Barco Vargas | June 7, 1977 | June 24, 1977 |
| Jorge Mario Eastman Robledo | November 6, 1980 | December 11, 1980 |
| Fernando Cepeda Ulloa | May 27, 1981 | |
| Fernando Gaviria Cadavid | July 28, 1981 | September 21, 1981 |
| Jorge Salazar | February 8, 1983 | |
| Álvaro Gómez Hurtado | March 9, 1983 | April 7, 1985 |
| Rodrigo Hernán Lloreda Caicedo | December 17, 1985 | January 15, 1986 |
| Francisco Posada de La Peña | February 28, 1986 | March 11, 1986 |
| Víctor Mosquera Chaux | November 12, 1987 | December 21, 1987 |
| Jaime García Parra | December 14, 1990 | February 19, 1991 |
| Gabriel Silva Luján | August 18, 1993 | October 1, 1993 |
| Carlos Lleras de la Fuente | August 9, 1994 | October 25, 1994 |
| Juan Carlos Esguerra Portocarrero | January 23, 1997 | February 11, 1997 |
| Luis Alberto Moreno Mejía | September 29, 1998 | October 27, 1998 |
| Andrés Pastrana Arango | November 9, 2005 | December 2, 2005 |
| Carolina Barco Isakson | September 7, 2006 | September 12, 2006 |
| Gabriel Silva Luján | August 7, 2010 | October 4, 2010 |
| Carlos Alfredo Urrutia Valenzuela | September 5, 2012 | September 19, 2012 |
| Luis Carlos Villegas | November 13, 2013 | December 3, 2013 |
| Juan Carlos Pinzón | July 29, 2015 | August 3, 2015 |
| Camilo Reyes Rodríguez | May 22, 2018 | |
| Francisco Santos Calderón | September 4, 2018 | September 17, 2018 |
| Luis Gilberto Murillo | September 8, 2022 | May 21, 2024 |
| Daniel García-Peña Jaramillo | July 15, 2024 | August 7, 2026 |

== See also ==
- Embassy of Colombia, Washington, D.C.
- United States Ambassador to Colombia
- Colombia – United States relations
