= Alfonso Dávila Ortiz =

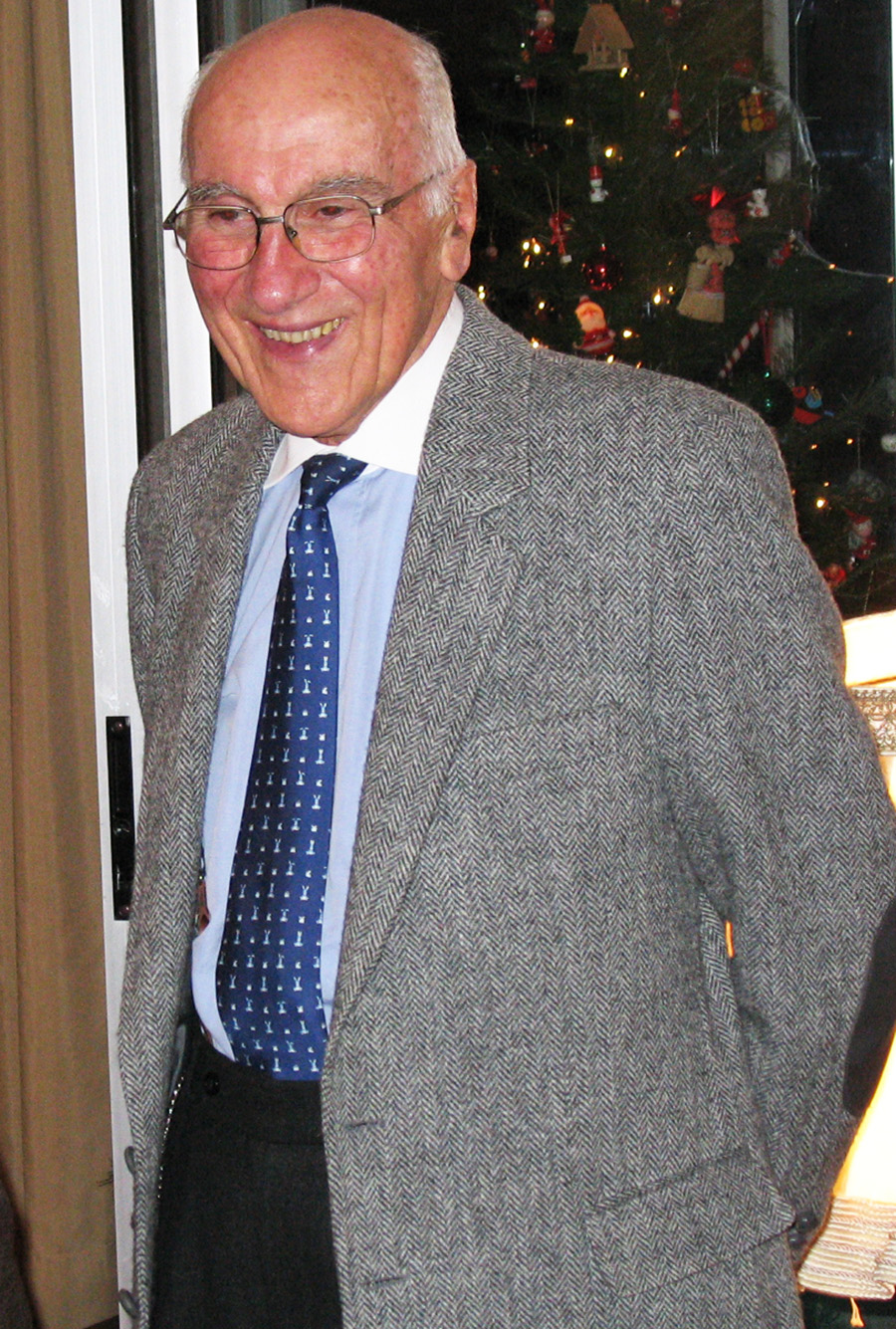

Personal details
- Born: Alfonso Dávila Ortiz; April 4, 1922 Bogotá, Colombia
- Died: November 10, 2015 Bogotá, Colombia
- Spouse: Gladys Silva Chéreau
- Children: Sonia, José Manuel, Miguel, Gladys Paulina, Consuelo, Alfonso, Carmen Lucía, Julio Daniel
- Education: Universidad Nacional de Colombia
- Profession: Civil Engineer

Alfonso Dávila Ortiz (4 April 1922 – 10 November 2015) was a Colombian civil engineer, diplomat, businessman and forester, former ambassador to Spain and Kuwait, Chargé d'Affaires in the United States of America, Governor of the Province of Cundinamarca, President of the Colombian Banker’s Association, twice President of the Colombian Association of Engineers, Councilor of the city of Bogotá, lifelong President of Bogotá’s Jockey Club and member of Colombia’s National Council of Public Works.

== Education ==
Alfonso Dávila Ortiz was born in Bogotá, Colombia to José Domingo Dávila Pumarejo and Paulina Ortiz on 4 April 1922. On 22 April 1944 he married Gladys Silva Chéreau, daughter of Colombian General Miguel Silva Plazas and Bertha Chéreau. They had eight children, six of whom survive. He died peacefully surrounded by his family on 10 November 2015 in Bogotá.

Following the sale in 1926 to the Municipality of Bogotá of the Compañía Nacional de Electricidad that he had founded (which merged with another private firm to create the nationalised Empresas Unidas de Energia), his father took his family to Europe (Brussels, Paris and Eastbourne) for five years. Dávila Ortiz was subsequently educated in the traditional Gimnasio Moderno of Bogotá, and graduated at 16. He completed a degree in Civil Engineering at Bogotá’s Universidad Nacional 5 years later. While running a successful construction businesses he subsequently completed a postgraduate degree in Economics at Bogotá’s Universidad de los Andes (1963), an MSc in Marketing in Spain (1982) and a postgraduate degree in Business Management at INALDE in Bogotá (1986). On 21 April 1961 the Universidad Distrital in Bogotá awarded him an Honorary Doctorate in Forestry.

== Business career ==
Dávila Ortiz started his professional career in housing construction in Bogotá, subsequently moving into construction of public infrastructure in the 1950s and early 1960s, mainly in Colombia’s Atlantic Coast. As CEO of private construction firms he had co-founded, he oversaw the completion of the Ciénaga-Barranquilla and Santa Marta-Riochacha highways, the Ernesto Cortissoz Airport in Barranquilla, the Simón Bolívar Airport in Santa Marta and the Atlántico Railway (Santa Rosa-El Paso section). Such interventions were seen as important propellers of development of Colombia's Caribbean region, as the physical isolation of the region from the centre of the country had historically been a major source of concern to national and local decision-makers and business entrepreneurs. In the 1940s he was one of a number of young Colombian professionals who were gradually taking over the design and construction of major buildings and infrastructure by local firms following the departure of mainly US companies, and given further impulse following the recommendations of a number of reports, such as the World Bank's 'Currie Mission' of 1950.

== Political career ==
He was elected Councilor of Bogotá in 1972-1974, and more importantly as Governor of the Province of Cundinamarca in 1972-1974, appointed by President Misael Pastrana Borrero (1970-1974). As Governor he pushed through a major administrative reform including the creation of six posts of ‘Deputy Governors’ to coordinate the work of (appointed) municipal mayors, and the creation in 1974 of the pioneering Cundinamarca Forestry Corporation with the aim of addressing the rapid deterioration of the province’s natural resources.

As a diplomat he represented Colombia firstly at the White House as Plenipotentiary Minister (Chargé d'Affaires) at the Colombian Embassy in Washington DC in 1975-1977, and later as Colombian Ambassador to Spain and Kuwait (in a non-resident capacity) in 1981-1983.

== Recognition ==
He was twice President of the Society of Colombian Engineers (1960 and 1961). He was founder and President of the Construction Chamber of Colombia (1967-1972), where he lobbied the Colombian government to include construction as an economic sector in the national accounts. He was President of the Bankers' Association of Colombia (1978-1981), acting Director of Bouwcentrum Colombia (1969), member of the Board of Directors of Bogotá’s Telecommunications Company (ETB), Colombia’s National Railways, Universidad de la sabana, founder of the INALDE Business School and President and Board Member of Bogotá’s elite Jockey Club.

== Publications ==
He published on national issues of urban land reform, tax reform, the construction industry, and forestry, drawing on his experience of nearly six decades of farming and reforesting farmland he purchased in 1950 in the Magdalena Medio region of Colombia.

“Por un alza del jornal mínimo agrícola. Un análisis crítico de la reforma agraria”. Supplement, Revista Semana, 17 March 1959 (co-authored with Enrique Liévano Ricaurte).

“Estatuto Nacional de la Construcción y el Urbanismo. Bases para una Reforma Urbana”, Boletín Informativo Camacol, July 1969.

“Influencia y Perspectivas de la Ingeniería en Colombia”, Anales de Ingeniería Vol. LXIV, June 1960.

“Renta Presuntiva frente a un Impuesto Territorial”, Revista Nacional de Ganadería No. 1, 1 May 1965.

“Estudio Económico del Desarrollo de una Ganadería Santa Gertrudis en pequeña escala”, Revista Nacional de Ganadería, No. 2, Vol.1, June 1965.

“Estudio de un método de incentivos para depositarios de ganado de ceba en compañía con el Fondo Ganadero de Cundinamarca”, Revista Nacional de Ganadería, Vol. II, No. 17-20, December 1966.

Minifundio rural: Latifundio urbano, Populibro No. 45, Bogotá, 1970.

La Reforma Administrativa de Cundinamarca, Imprenta Departamental, 1974.

“La descentralización en el control de los recursos naturales”, Revista de la Cámara de Comercio de Bogotá, No. 30-31, March–June 1978.

“Contribución a la política de seguridad, producción y empleo”, Cuaderno Asobancaria, 1978.

La Reforestación en Colombia, Visión de Futuro, Konrad Adenauer Stiftung-Fedemaderas, Bogotá, 2007. ISBN 978-958-44-2247-7

El Jockey Club que yo conocí, Villegas Editores, Bogotá, 2010. ISBN 978-958-8293-73-8 (awarded first prize in the History/Politics category in New York on 25 May 2011 at The International Latino Book Awards).

Confidencias a mis hijos y a mis nietos, Villegas Editores, Bogotá, 2014. ISBN 978-958-8836-17-1
