= Luis Alberto Moreno =

Colombian businessman & diplomat (born 1953)

Luis Moreno
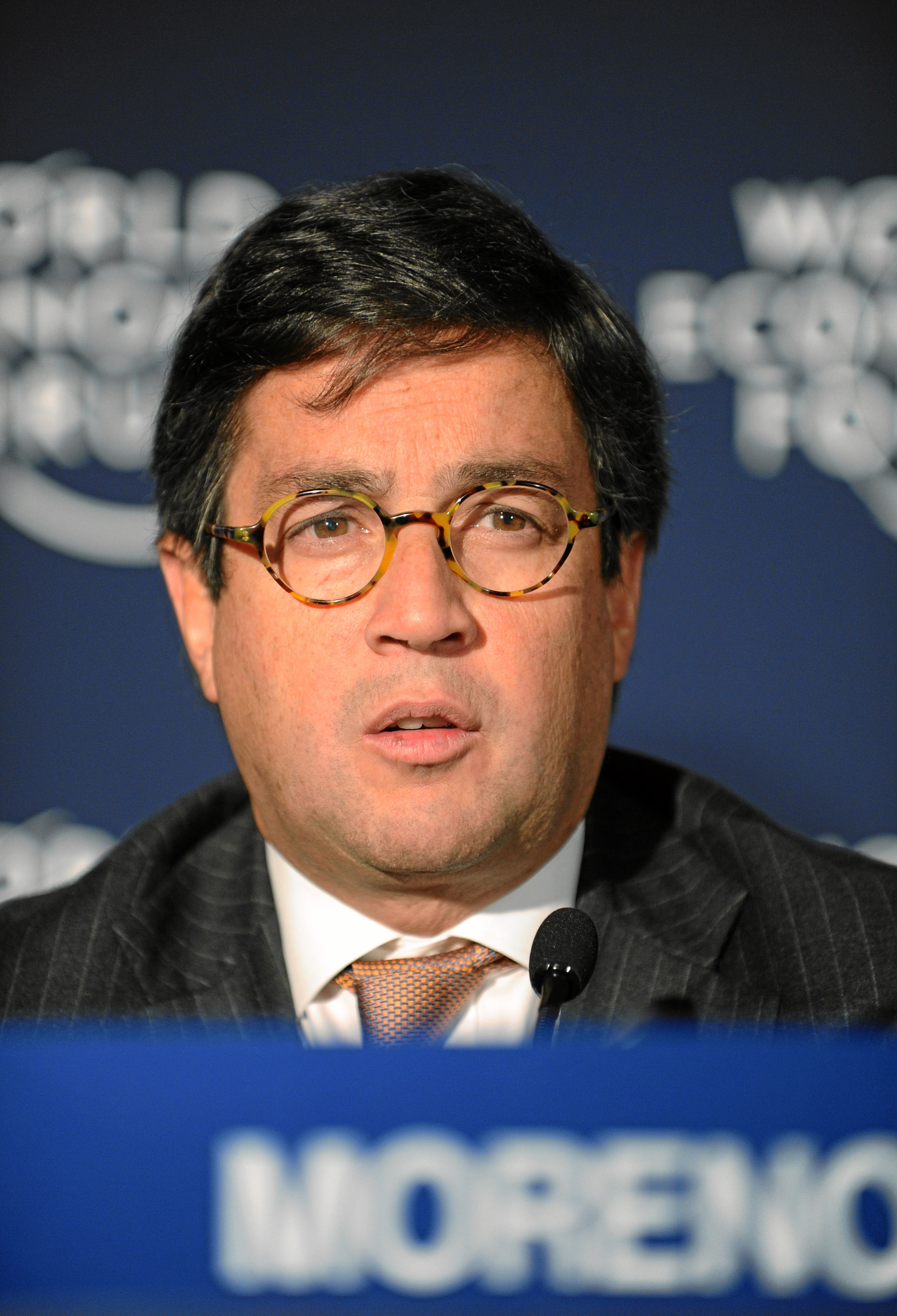
- Moreno at the World Economic Forum in Davos, Switzerland in 2011

President of the Inter-American Development Bank
- In office 1 October 2005 – 30 September 2020
- Preceded by: Enrique V. Iglesias
- Succeeded by: Mauricio Claver-Carone

Colombia Ambassador to the United States
- In office 27 October 1998 – 27 June 2005
- President: Andrés Pastrana Arango
- Preceded by: Juan Carlos Esguerra Portocarrero
- Succeeded by: Andrés Pastrana Arango

Minister of Economic Development
- In office 5 July 1992 – 17 January 1994
- President: César Gaviria
- Preceded by: Jorge Ospina Sardi
- Succeeded by: Mauricio Cárdenas Santamaría

Personal details
- Born: Luis Alberto Moreno Mejía; May 3, 1953 (age 73) Philadelphia, Pennsylvania, U.S.
- Party: Conservative
- Spouse(s): Adrianne Foglia (m. 1982; div. 1994) Gabriela Cordero (m. 1995; div. 2011) María Sigala (m. 2016)
- Children: 2
- Parent(s): Bernardo Moreno; Marta Mejía
- Relatives: Bernie Moreno (brother)
- Education: Florida Atlantic University (BBA); Thunderbird School of Global Management (MBA)
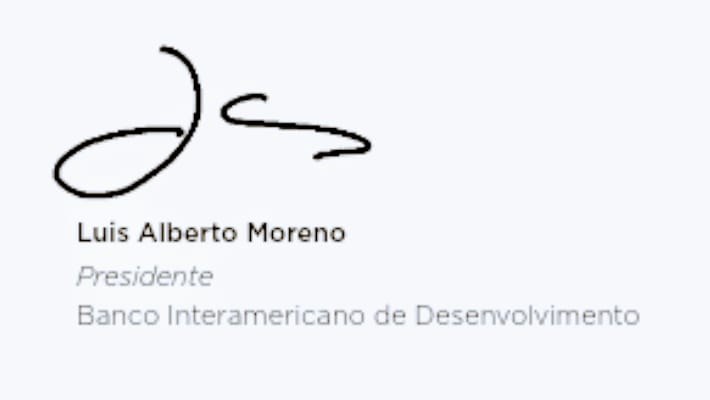
- Signature

Luis Alberto Moreno Mejía (born 3 May 1953) is a Colombian-American businessman and former diplomat who served as President of the Inter-American Development Bank (IADB) from 2005 to 2020. He was also Colombia's Ambassador to the United States under President Andrés Pastrana Arango from 1998 to 2005, and is the former President of the Instituto de Fomento Industrial. He currently serves as a member of the Board of Trustees at the World Economic Forum (WEF) since 2011.

== Early life and education ==
Moreno was born in Philadelphia to his Colombian father, Bernardo Moreno Mejía (1928–2013), who at the time was attending medical school at the University of Pennsylvania, and his mother, Marta Mejía Pradilla. He was raised in Bogota, where he studied at Colegio San Carlos and returned to the United States to attend college. He obtained bachelor's degrees in Business Administration and Economics from Florida Atlantic University in 1975 and an MBA from the Thunderbird School of Global Management (now part of Arizona State University) in 1977.

== Career ==
=== Early career ===
Moreno was Executive Producer of "TV Hoy", an award-winning news program, from January 1982 to September 1990. For his distinguished work in the field of journalism, he was awarded a Nieman Fellowship by Harvard University.

=== Government ===
During the administration of Colombian President César Gaviria, Moreno worked in several cabinet positions. Moreno was the President of the Instituto de Fomento Industrial (IFI) which was a holding company for many of the largest state-owned enterprises. While at IFI, he pushed for a large privatization plan in the country. He was later appointed Minister of Economic Development.

In 1998, Moreno was named Colombia's Ambassador to the United States by newly elected president Andrés Pastrana Arango. He was the ambassador for seven years and oversaw a dramatic improvement in Colombian-U.S. relations. He helped build bipartisan support in the United States Congress for passage of more than US$4 billion in U.S. assistance programs for Colombia. He also worked on a free trade accord between Colombia and the United States.

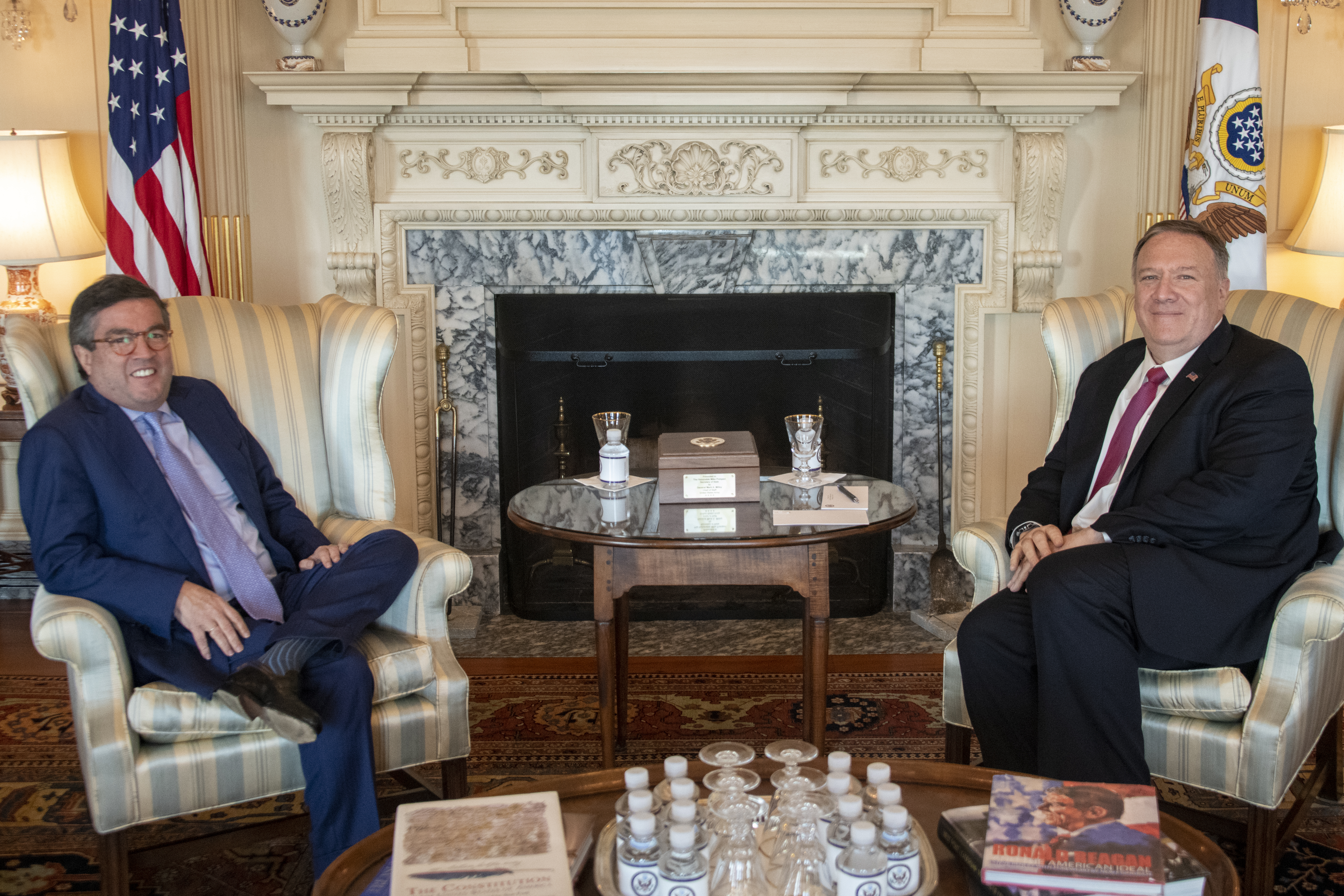
Moreno meets with U.S. Secretary of State Michael R. Pompeo at the Department of State in Washington, D.C., November 4, 2019.

=== Inter-American Development Bank ===
In 2005, Moreno was nominated for president of the IDB by the administration of President Álvaro Uribe. He took office in October that same year. He was re-elected in 2010 and again in 2015. Milestones during Moreno's tenure include: the approval in 2007 of $4.4 billion in debt relief for Bolivia, Guyana, Haiti, Honduras and Nicaragua, the most heavily indebted member countries; the approval in 2010 of the Ninth General Capital Increase, the largest expansion of resources in the Bank’s history; the merging and expansion in 2016 of the Group’s private-sector operations under IDB Invest; the replenishment in 2017 of IDB Lab with historic contributions from Latin American and Caribbean countries; the launch in 2019 of a special grant facility to help countries integrate migrants into local communities and contribute to their development; and the institution-wide response in 2020 to the coronavirus pandemic.

== Later career ==
In early 2021, Moreno was appointed by the G20 to the High Level Independent Panel (HLIP) on financing the global commons for pandemic preparedness and response, co-chaired by Ngozi Okonjo-Iweala, Tharman Shanmugaratnam and Lawrence Summers.

== Other activities ==
- Center for Global Development (CGD), Member of the Board of Directors
- Clinton Health Access Initiative (CHAI), Member of the Board of Directors
- End Malaria Council, Member (since 2017)
- International Olympic Committee (IOC), Member (since 2015)
- World Economic Forum (WEF), Member of the Board of Trustees (since 2011)

== Recognition ==
In 2017, Moreno received the Distinguished Leadership Award for Social Equity from the Inter-American Dialogue.

== Personal life ==
Moreno is married to María Gabriela Sigala, a Venezuelan philanthropist, ex-wife of Henrique Salas Feo. He has two children from his first marriage, Nicolas and Natalia. His younger brother, Bernie Moreno, is an American politician who has served in the U.S. Senate since 2025.

Diplomatic posts
Preceded by Enrique V. Iglesias	President of the Inter-American Development Bank; 2005–2020	Succeeded by Mauricio Claver-Carone
