= Carlos Adolfo Urueta =

Colombian statesman

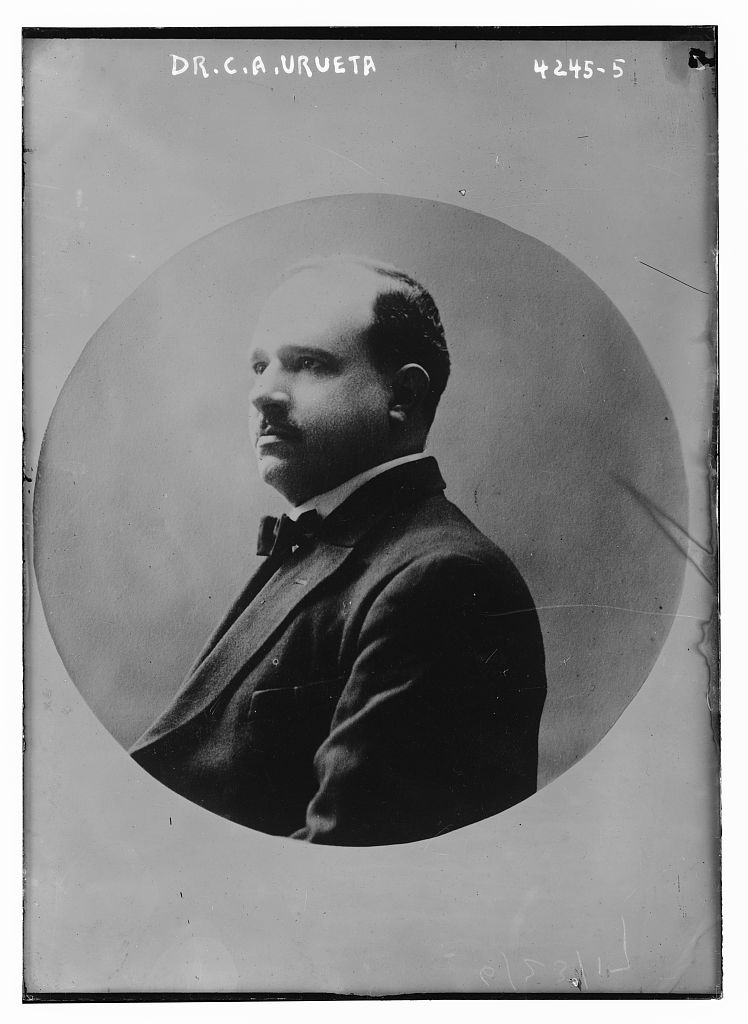
- Urueta in 1917

Ambassador of Colombia to the United States
- In office June 11, 1917 – October 15, 1921
- Succeeded by: Carlos Uribe

Minister of Foreign Affairs
- In office 1921–1931

Minister of National Defense
- In office July 27, 1931 – September 13, 1931

Personal details
- Born: 1873 Ayapel, Colombia
- Died: September 13, 1931 (aged 58) Bogotá, Colombia
- Education: University of Bolivar

Carlos Adolfo Urueta (1873 – September 13, 1931) was a Colombian statesman. He was the Ambassador of Colombia to the United States from June 11, 1917, to October 15, 1921. He was the Minister of Foreign Affairs in 1921. He was the Minister of National Defense starting on July 27, 1931, to his death.

== Biography ==
He was born in 1873 in Ayapel, Colombia and he attended the University of Bolivar, at Cartagena.

He was the Ambassador of Colombia to the United States starting on June 11, 1917, and was succeeded by Carlos Uribe on October 15, 1921.

He was the Minister of Foreign Affairs in 1921. He was the Minister of National Defense starting on July 27, 1931, to his death.

He died on September 13, 1931.
