= Gabriel Silva Luján =

Colombian politician (born 1957

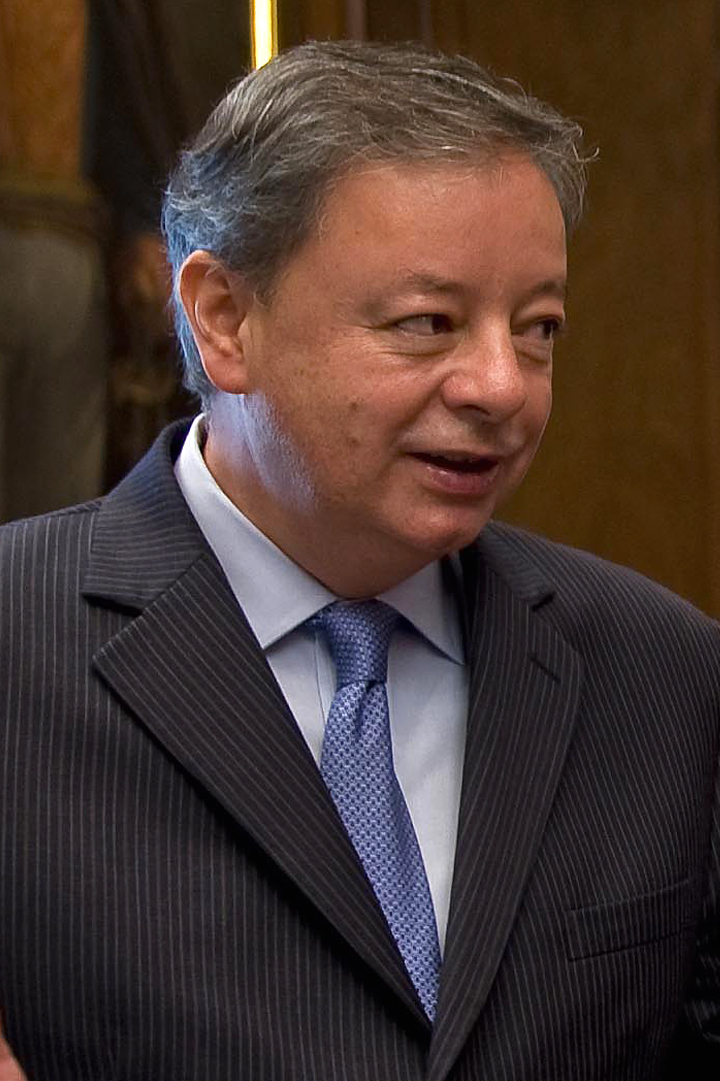
- Silva Luján in 2010

33rd Colombia Ambassador to the United States
- In office 4 October 2010 – 19 September 2012
- Preceded by: Carolina Barco Isakson
- Succeeded by: Carlos Urrutia

Minister of National Defence
- In office 7 August 2009 – 7 August 2010
- President: Álvaro Uribe
- Preceded by: Freddy Padilla de León
- Succeeded by: Rodrigo Rivera Salazar

27th Colombia Ambassador to the United States
- President: César Gaviria Trujillo
- Preceded by: Jaime García Parra
- Succeeded by: Carlos Lleras de la Fuente

Personal details
- Born: 5 October 1957 (age 68) Barranquilla, Atlántico, Colombia
- Spouses: María Consuelo Daza (divorced); Mariana Espinosa (2009–present)
- Education: University of the Andes (B.A.); Johns Hopkins University (PhD)
- Profession: Political Scientist, Economist

Gabriel Silva Luján (born 5 October 1957) is a Colombian diplomat and political scientist who served as the 33rd and 27th Ambassador of Colombia to the United States. He has also served as Minister of National Defence and as General Manager of the National Federation of Coffee Growers of Colombia.

== Background ==
Gabriel Silva Luján was born in Barranquilla on 5 October 1957. After completing his secondary education at the Colegio San Carlos and graduating with a degree in political science with a concentration in economics from the University of the Andes in Bogotá, Silva travelled to the United States where he completed his graduate studies in Economics and International Relations at the Paul H. Nitze School of Advanced International Studies of Johns Hopkins University in Washington D.C. under a Ford Foundation fellowship grant.

== Career ==
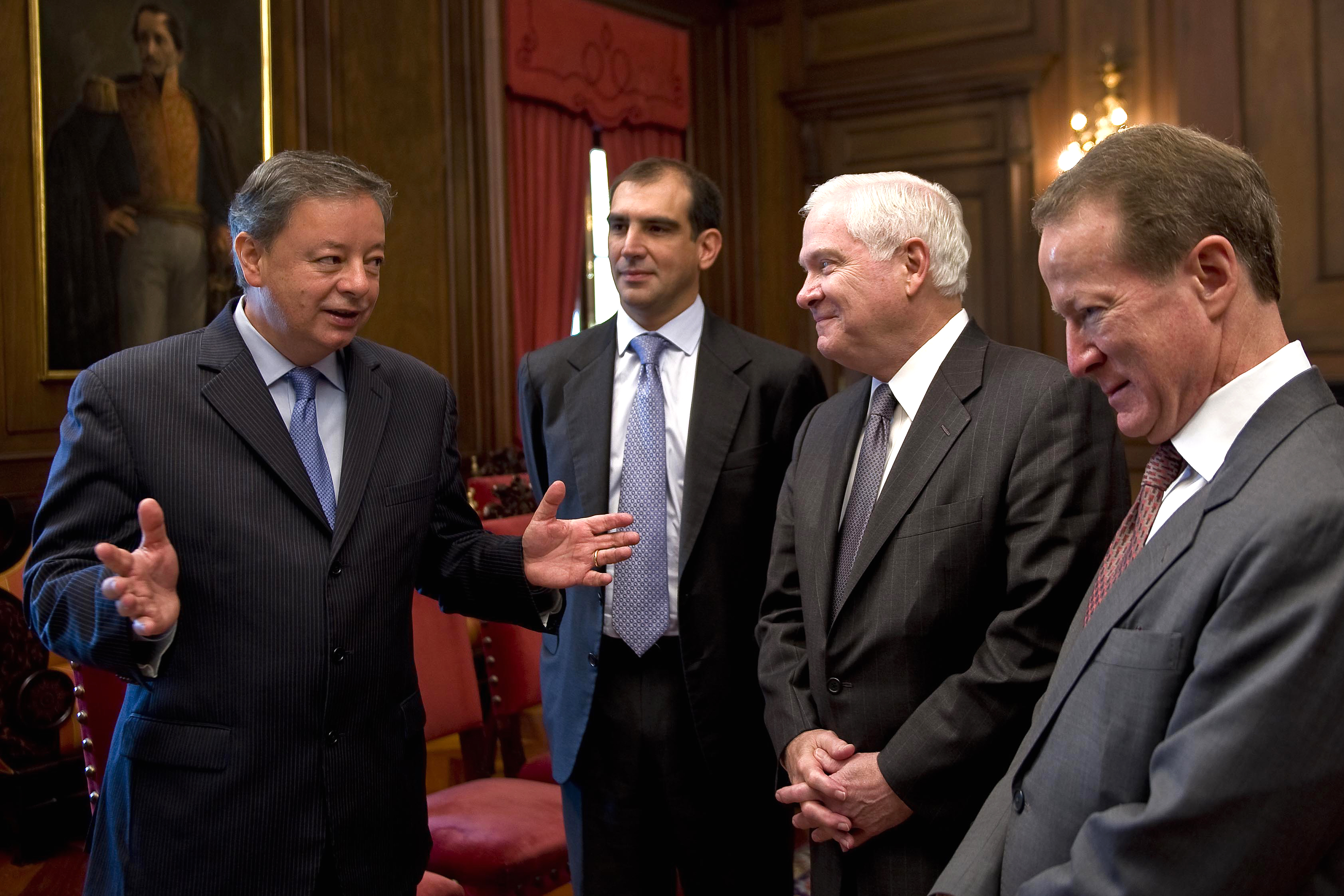
Minister Silva, U.S. Defence Secretary Robert M. Gates, center right, and U.S. Ambassador to Colombia William R. Brownfield talk to one another at the Casa de Nariño.

Silva was named Ambassador to the United States by the President-elect Juan Manuel Santos on 27 July 2010 during an official visit to lima, Peru during Santos's pre-inauguration international tour. His appointment was interpreted as a reiteration of Colombia's security concerns going forward: "I believe that the purpose of my appointment is a clear signal that security and defence issues in bilateral relations with the United States are still very important," Silva told reporters.

== Works ==
- Silva Luján, Gabriel (1985). Política Exterior: ¿Continuidad o Ruptura?: Reseña de un Debate [Foreign Policy: Continuity or Rupture?: Outline of a Debate]. Serie Politica Internacional No. 4 (in Spanish). Preface by Fernando Cepeda Ulloa. Bogotá: Fondo Editorial CEREC. ISBN 978-958-9061-07-7. OCLC 253148083.
  - Pierre Gilhodes (1986). "Seis visiones sobre la política exterior de Betancur". Boletín Cultural y Bibliográfico (Review) (in Spanish). Vol. XXIII, no. 7 – via La Biblioteca Luis Ángel Arango.

=== Collaborations ===
- Santamaría, Ricardo; Silva Luján, Gabriel (1984). Proceso Politico en Colombia : del Frente Nacional a la Apertura Democratica [Political Process in Colombia: from the National Front to the Democratic Opening]. Serie Realidad Nacional № 5 (in Spanish). Bogotá: Fondo Editorial CEREC. ISBN 978-958-9061-01-5. OCLC 12899594.
- Silva Luján, Gabriel in Tirado Mejía, Álvaro, ed. (1989). "Historia Política 1946-1986" [Political History 1946-1986]. Nueva Historia de Colombia, Vol. II [New History of Colombia, Vol. II] (in Spanish). Bogotá: Editorial Planeta. ISBN 9789586142519. OCLC 492274243.
  - "El Origen del frente Nacional y el Gobierno de la Junta Militar" [The Origins of the National Front and the Government of the Military Junta]. pp 179–210.
  - "Lleras Camargo y Valencia: Entre El Reformismo y La Represión" [Lleras Camargo and Valencia: Between Reformism and Repression]. pp 211–236.
  - "Carlos Lleras y Misael Pastrana: Reformas del Estado y Crisis del Frente Nacional" [Carlos Lleras and Misael Pastrana: State Reforms and Crisis of the National Front]. pp 237–262.
- Reina, Mauricio; Silva Luján, Gabriel; Samper, Luis Fernando; del Pilar Fernández, María (2008) [2007]. Juan Valdez: Strategy Behind the Brand. Bogota: Ediciones B. ISBN 978-958-8294-45-2. OCLC 495227338.
