= Mauricio Claver-Carone =

American lawyer (born 1975)

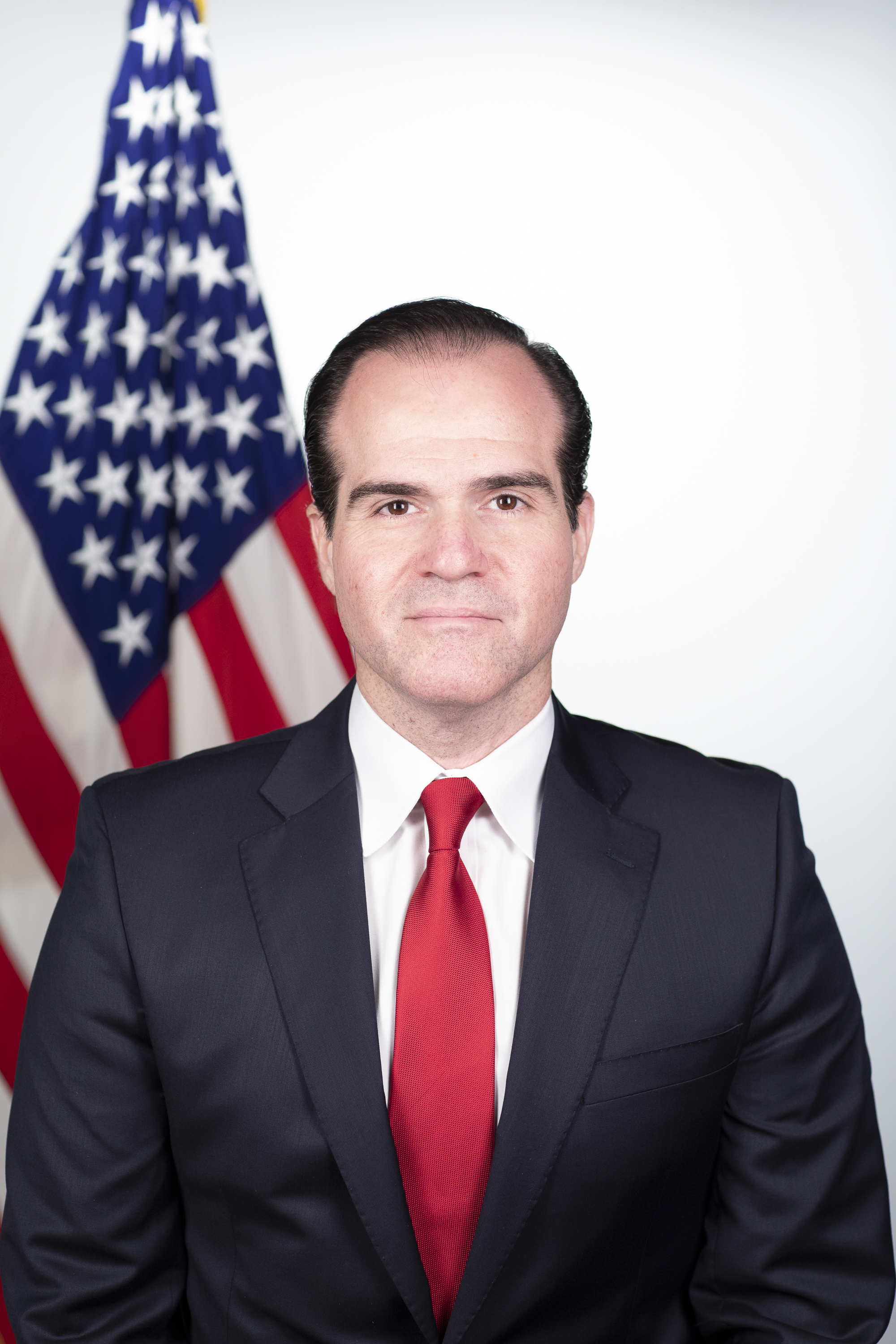
- Official portrait, 2019

United States Special Envoy for Latin America
- Incumbent
- Assumed office January 20, 2025
- President: Donald Trump
- Preceded by: Position established

President of the Inter-American Development Bank
- In office October 1, 2020 – September 26, 2022
- Preceded by: Luis Alberto Moreno
- Succeeded by: Reina Mejía (Acting)

Personal details
- Born: 1975 (age 50–51) Miami, Florida, U.S.
- Party: Republican
- Education: Rollins College (BA); Catholic University (JD); Georgetown University (LLM)

Mauricio Claver-Carone (born 1975) is an American lawyer, investor, diplomat and lobbyist. He was an official in the Treasury Department, National Security Council and State Department, in both Donald Trump Administrations. He was nominated and elected as the first American President of the Inter-American Development Bank, a position he held from October 2020 until September 26, 2022. He was ousted after an ethics investigation ruled a noncompliant intimate relationship with a subordinate.

== Early life and education ==
Claver-Carone was born in Miami, Florida, to parents of Cuban and Spanish descent. He earned his Bachelor of Arts degree from Rollins College, Juris Doctor from The Catholic University of America and Master of Laws in International and Comparative Law from Georgetown University Law Center.

== Career ==
=== Government positions and IMF role ===
From 2017 to 2018, Claver-Carone was Senior Advisor for International Affairs at the U.S. Department of the Treasury, where he was a principal policy advisor to the Secretary of the Treasury and to the Under Secretary for International Affairs on geopolitical, national security and economic issues.

A foreign policy hawk, Claver-Carone has lobbied for hard-line positions on Cuba and Venezuela.

He then served as acting U.S. Executive Director at the International Monetary Fund, representing the United States on the Executive Board. He played an important role in lending arrangements for Argentina, Barbados and Ecuador, and revolving credit lines for Colombia and Mexico.

In September 2018, Claver-Carone was appointed Special Assistant to U.S. President Donald Trump and Senior Director for Western Hemisphere Affairs at the National Security Council. In 2019, he was promoted to become a Deputy Assistant to the President. In this role, Claver-Carone is credited for creating the U.S. government's maximum-pressure campaign against the Maduro regime in Venezuela and for conceptualizing the "América Crece" economic growth strategy and frameworks. He was also selected by President Trump to represent the United States in inauguration delegations to Brazil, Panama and Uruguay.

=== Inter-American Development Bank ===
In June 2020, the U.S. Department of the Treasury announced its intention to nominate Claver-Carone for the president of the Inter-American Development Bank (IDB), the principal source of long-term financing for economic, social and institutional development in Latin America and the Caribbean.

His nomination generated a mixed reaction among the Bank’s member countries, as the institution’s presidency was historically reserved for a citizen of one of its borrowing member countries.

He was elected by the IDB’s Board of Directors on September 12, 2020, for a five-year term beginning on October 1, 2020. Thirty of the Bank's 48 governors voted for him (67% of total shareholding), including 23 out of the 28 regional governors.

On September 26, 2022, Claver-Carone was removed from the presidency with a vote by the governors; after an ethics investigation alleged that he had an affair with a subordinate. Claver-Carone accused the investigation, which had concluded that "there is no direct evidence of an existing relationship between Mr. Claver-Carone and [his staffer]," of being "arbitrary and ad hoc" and as an effort of the Biden administration to "smear his reputation."

Despite the controversy, under Claver-Carone's presidency, the IDB successfully optimized its balance sheet to deliver record-breaking financing of $23.4 billion while implementing unprecedented cost savings; more than doubled its net income from 2020-2022; built a private sector coalition to achieve record-breaking co-financing and mobilization; had the biggest single-year gains ever in transparency indicators and stakeholder satisfaction surveys; named the most women to positions of decision-making power ever in the history of the Bank; ensured small countries were represented in the most senior ranks for the first time; earned long-lost bipartisan support from U.S. Congressional leaders; and ended the Bank's deals with China over the last decade.

=== Cuba policy ===
Before joining the U.S. government, Claver-Carone was executive director of Cuba Democracy Advocates, a lobbying organization for human rights, free markets and the rule of law in Cuba.

=== Private equity ===
After the Inter-American Development Bank, Claver-Carone founded a private-equity firm focused on energy and infrastructure investments in the high-growth markets of Latin America and the Caribbean.

=== Venezuela ===
Claver-Carone "emerged as one of ‌the Trump administration's most influential players on Venezuela since" the 2026 United States intervention in Venezuela, a role likened to a viceroy. In July 2026, Claver-Carone was reportedly forced out.

== Other ==
He has written for HuffPost, The Wall Street Journal and The New York Times, among other publications. He has also published in academic journals, including the Georgetown Journal of International Law and the Yale Journal of International Affairs. Poder Magazine recognized him as one of 20 entrepreneurs, executives, leaders and artists under 40 who are shaping the future of the U.S. and the world. Claver-Carone hosted the bilingual foreign-policy show From Washington al Mundo on Sirius-XM Radio.

Diplomatic posts
Preceded by Luis Alberto Moreno	President of the Inter-American Development Bank; 2020–2022	Succeeded by Reina Mejía; Acting
