= Francisco José Urrutia Olano =

Colombian diplomat and international jurist (1870–1950)

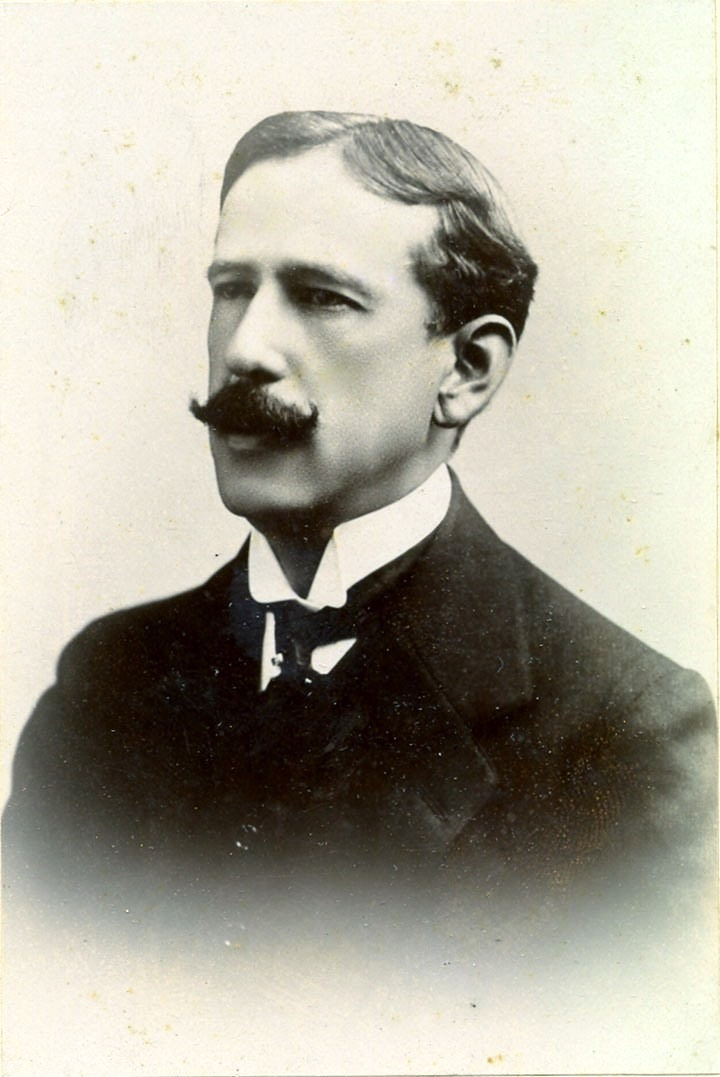

Judge of the Permanent Court of International Justice
- In office 15 January 1931 – 9 January 1942

Colombia's Minister of Foreign Affairs
- In office 10 December 1912 – 7 August 1914
- President: Carlos E Restrepo Restrepo
- Preceded by: José María González Valencia
- Succeeded by: Miguel Abadía Méndez
- In office 9 March 1908 – 13 March 1909
- President: Rafael Reyes Prieto
- Preceded by: Diego Euclides de Angulo
- Succeeded by: Marceliano Vargas

Personal details
- Born: 12 April 1870 Popayán, Popayán, Republic of New Granada
- Died: 6 August 1950 (aged 80) Bogotá, D.C., Colombia
- Spouse: Elena Holguín Arboleda (1909-1950)
- Children: Francisco J Urrutia Holguín; María de la Paz Urrutia Holguín; Sofía Urrutia Holguín; Carlos Urrutia Holguín
- Profession: Lawyer

Francisco José Urrutia Olano (12 April 1870 – 6 August 1950) was a Colombian diplomat and international jurist. He served as Colombia's Minister of Foreign Affairs first from 1908 to 1909, and again from 1912 to 1914, during which he signed the Thomson–Urrutia Treaty, which re-established diplomatic relations between the United States and Colombia. He was Minister Plenipotentiary to the governments of Bolivia, Spain, Switzerland, and Permanent Representative to the League of Nations Assembly, holding the Presidency of the Executive Council in representation of Colombia in 1928. In 1931, he was elected to serve as Permanent Judge on the Permanent Court of International Justice at The Hague, where he served until 1942 when he resigned due to theonset of World War II.

== Personal life ==
Francisco José Urrutia Olano was born on 12 April 1870 in Popayán, Colombia to Francisco de Paula Urrutia Ordoñez, Minister Plenipotentiary of Colombia in Quito, and Dolores Olano Hurtado. He married in Popayán on 24 June 1909 to Elena Holguín Arboleda, and together had four children: Francisco José (1910), María de la Paz (1911), Sofía (1912), and Carlos (1917).

== Selected works ==
- Urrutia Olano, Francisco José (1906-05-05). La Doctrina de Monroe [The Monroe Doctrine] (in Spanish). Quito: Imp. Universidad Central. OCLC 19953396.
- Urrutia Olano, Francisco José (1918). Los Estados Unidos de América Y Las Repúblicas Hispano-Americanas de 1810 á 1830: Páginas de Historia Diplomática [The United States of America and The Hispanic-American Republics from 1810 to 1830: Pages of Diplomatic History] (in Spanish). Madrid: Editorial-América. OCLC 504391990.
- Urrutia Olano, Francisco José (1916). A Commentary on the Declaration of the Rights of Nations Adopted by the American Institute of International Law. Washington, D.C. ISBN 978-1-154-48697-1. OCLC 650767503.
- Urrutia Olano, Francisco José (1920). La Evolucion del Principio de Arbitraje en America: La Sociedad de Naciones [The Evolution of the Principle of Arbitration in America: The League of Nations] (in Spanish). Madrid: Editorial-América. OCLC 2455240.
- Urrutia Olano, Francisco José (1913). "The Commercial, Bills of Exchange, Bankruptcy and Maritime Law of Ecuador". In Scrutton, Thomas Edward; Bowstead, William; Huberich, Charles Henry (eds.). The Commercial laws of the world, comprising mercantile, bills of exchange, bankruptcy and maritime laws of all civilised nations. Boston: Boston Book Co. OCLC 9792935.
