= Francisco de Paula Urrutia Ordóñez =

Colombian expatriate businessman

Francisco de Paula Urrutia Ordoñez

9th Envoy Extraordinary and Minister Plenipotentiary of Colombia to Ecuador
- In office 21 March 1889 – 12 September 1893
- President: Rafael W Núñez Moledo
- Preceded by: Bartolomé Calvo Díaz
- Succeeded by: Ramón Santodomingo Vila

Personal details
- Born: 2 April 1827 Popayán, Cauca, Colombia
- Died: 12 September 1893 (aged 66) Quito, Pichincha, Ecuador
- Spouse: Dolores Olano Hurtado (1858-1983)
- Children: Francisco J Urrutia Olano
- Occupation: Businessman

Francisco de Paula Urrutia Ordoñez (2 April 1827 — 12 September 1893) was a Colombian expatriate businessman living in Quito who served as 8th Envoy Extraordinary and Minister Plenipotentiary ad honorem of Colombia to Ecuador from 1889 to his death in 1893.

== Personal life ==
Born on 2 April 1827 to Manuel José Urrutia y Quijano and Joaquina Ordóñez Balcázar in Popayán, during the period known as the Gran Colombia. On 14 April 1958 he married Dolores Olano Hurtado in Popayán, and out this union his son Francisco José was born. He was forced to leave Colombia with his family for Ecuador during the Colombian Civil War of 1876, where he remained afterwards.
