= Colombia–United States relations =

- Colombia: United States

Diplomatic mission
- Embassy of Colombia, Washington, D.C.: Embassy of the United States, Bogotá

Envoy
- Ambassador of the Republic of Colombia to the United States: U.S. Chargé d'affaires to the Republic of Colombia Brendan O'Brien

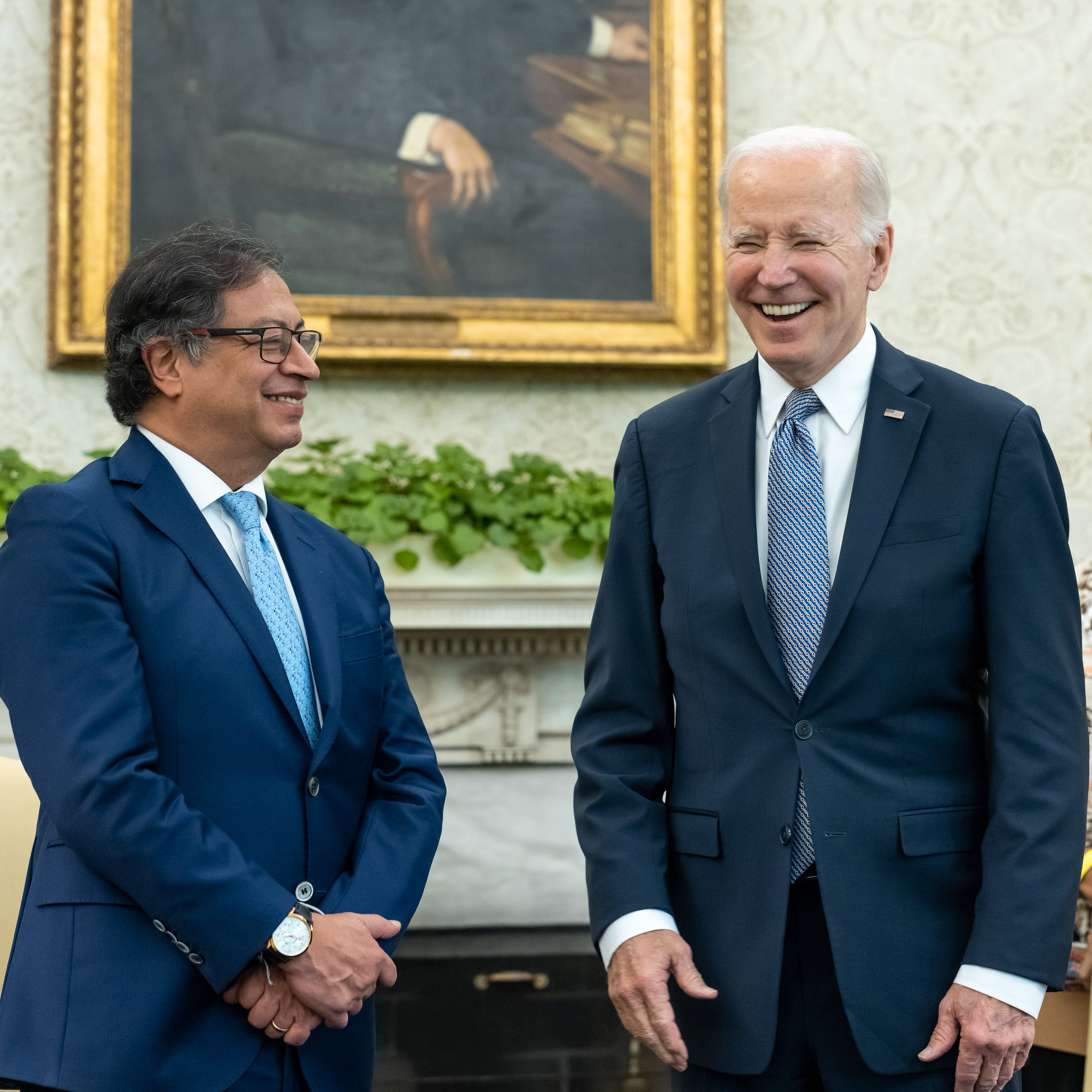
President Gustavo Petro with President Joe Biden, April 2023.

The relationship between Colombia and the United States evolved from a mutual cordiality during the 19th and early 20th centuries to an early-2000s partnership that linked the governments of both nations around several key issues; this includes fighting communism, the war on drugs, and the threat of terrorism due to the September 11 attacks in 2001.

During the fifty years prior to 2005, different American governments and their representatives became involved in Colombian affairs through the implementation of policies concerned with a number of these issues. Some critics of US policies in Colombia, such as Law Professor John Barry, claimed in 2002 that US influences had catalyzed internal conflicts and substantially expanded the scope and nature of human rights abuses in Colombia. Supporters, such as Under Secretary of State Marc Grossman, in 2002 defended the idea that the United States had promoted respect for human rights and the rule of law in Colombia; in addition, adding to the fight against drugs and terrorism. A signing member of the Rio Pact and SICOFAA, as well as a regular participant in RIMPAC, Colombia was notably the only South American nation to support the US-led Iraq War in 2003. In 2022, Colombia was designated a Major non-NATO ally. Relations deteriorated significantly during the second presidency of Donald Trump, during which the US government imposed sanctions on Colombian President Gustavo Petro, however, following the election victory of Abelardo de la Espriella, relations between the two nations improved once again as bilateral cooperation was restored.

== Historical overview ==
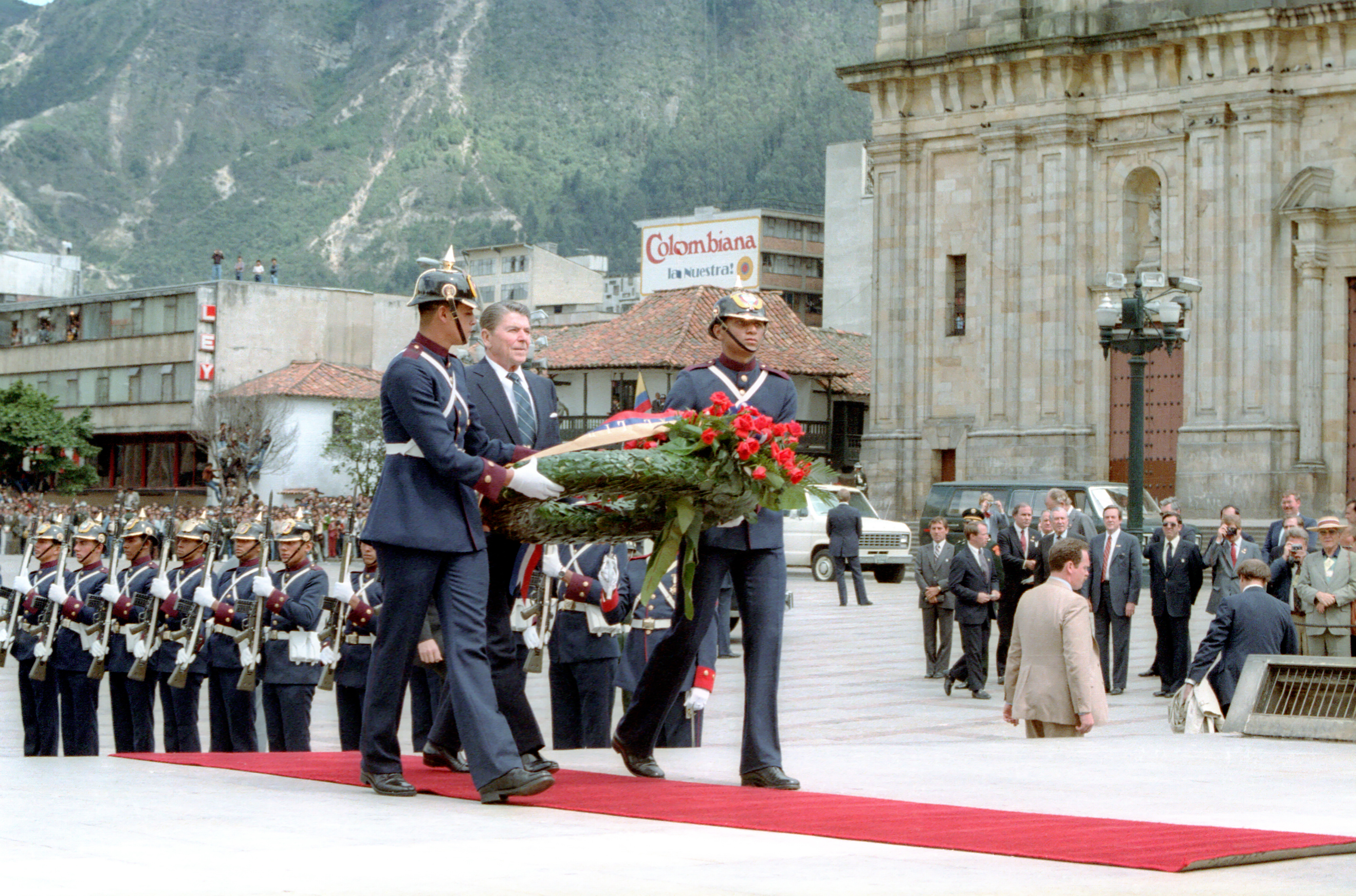
President Ronald Reagan laying a wreath at Simon Bolivar's statue in Bogota in 1982.

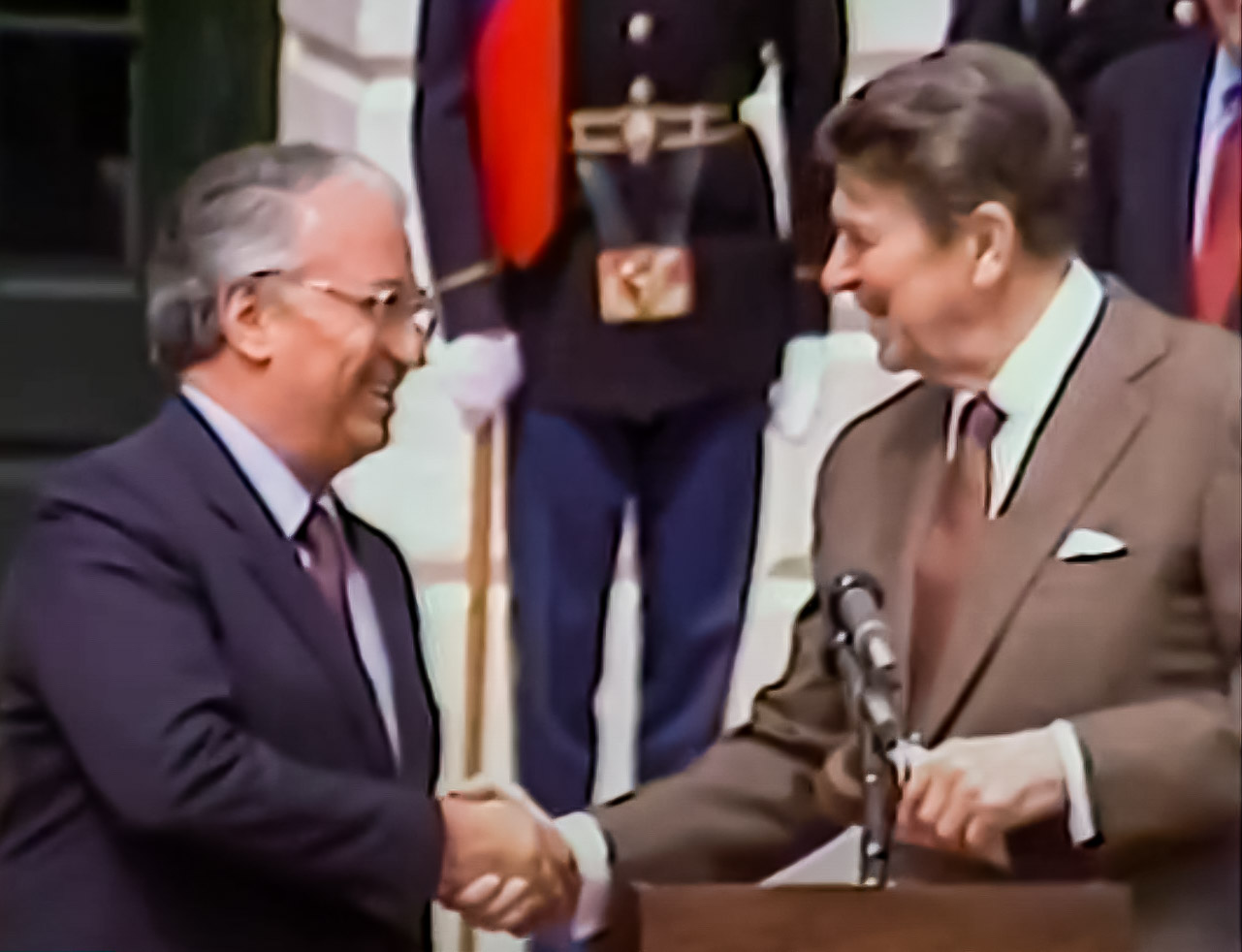
Belisario Betancur and Ronald Reagan in 1985.

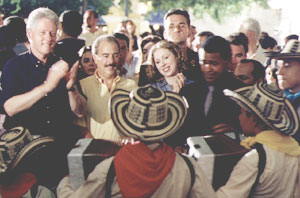
Former U.S. President Bill Clinton, meeting the former Colombian President Andrés Pastrana in Cartagena, Colombia.

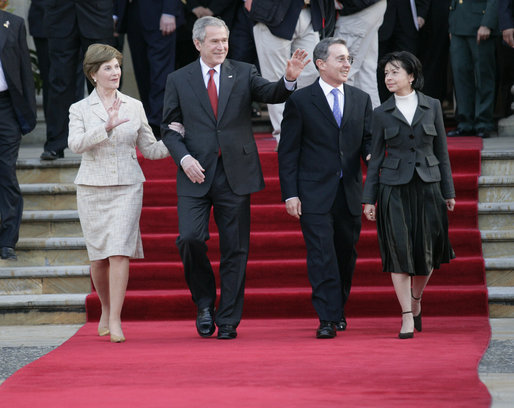
Uribe and Bush in Bogotá, with their wives in 2007.

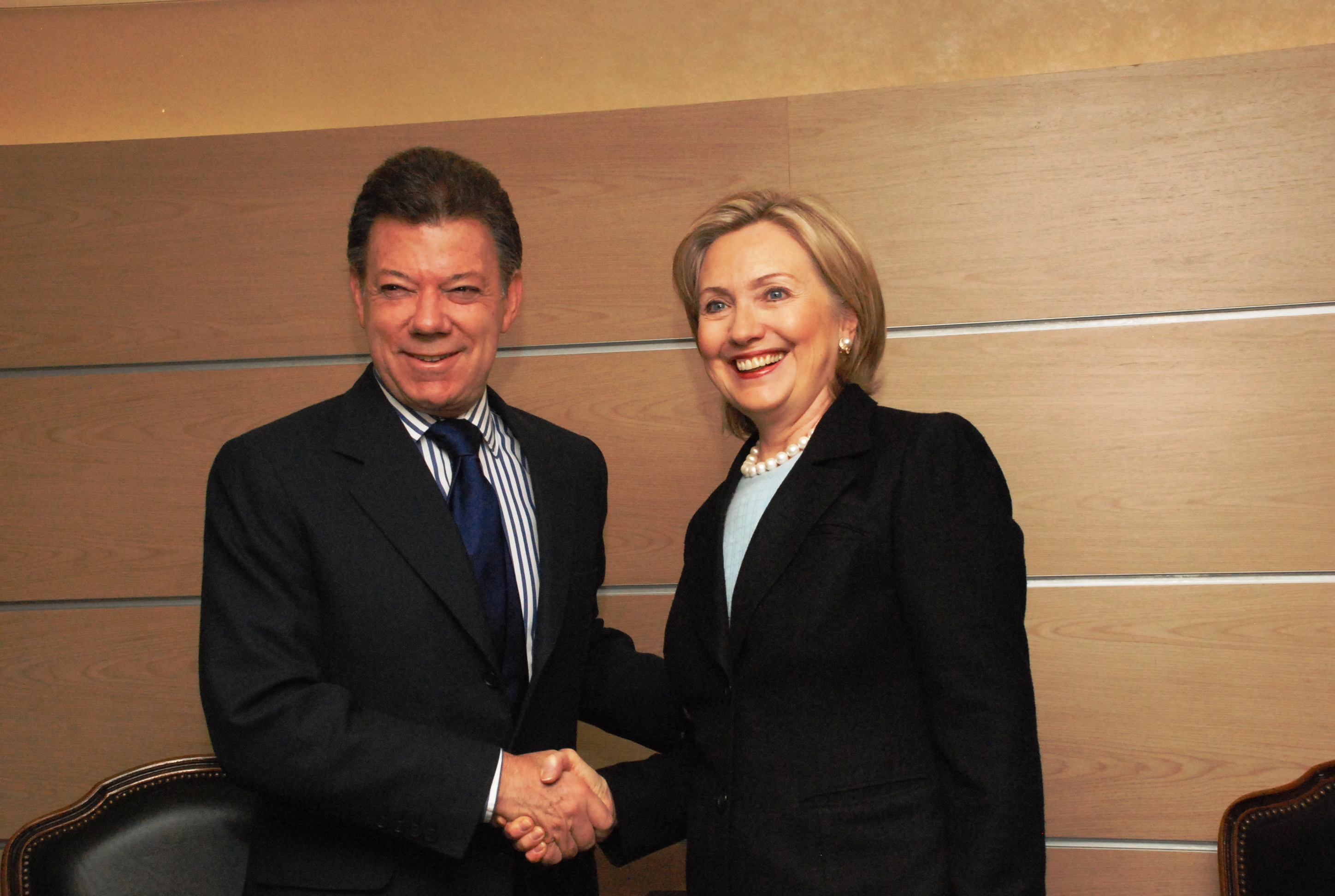
President of Colombia, Juan Manuel Santos and U.S. Secretary of State, Hillary Clinton seeking business relationships.

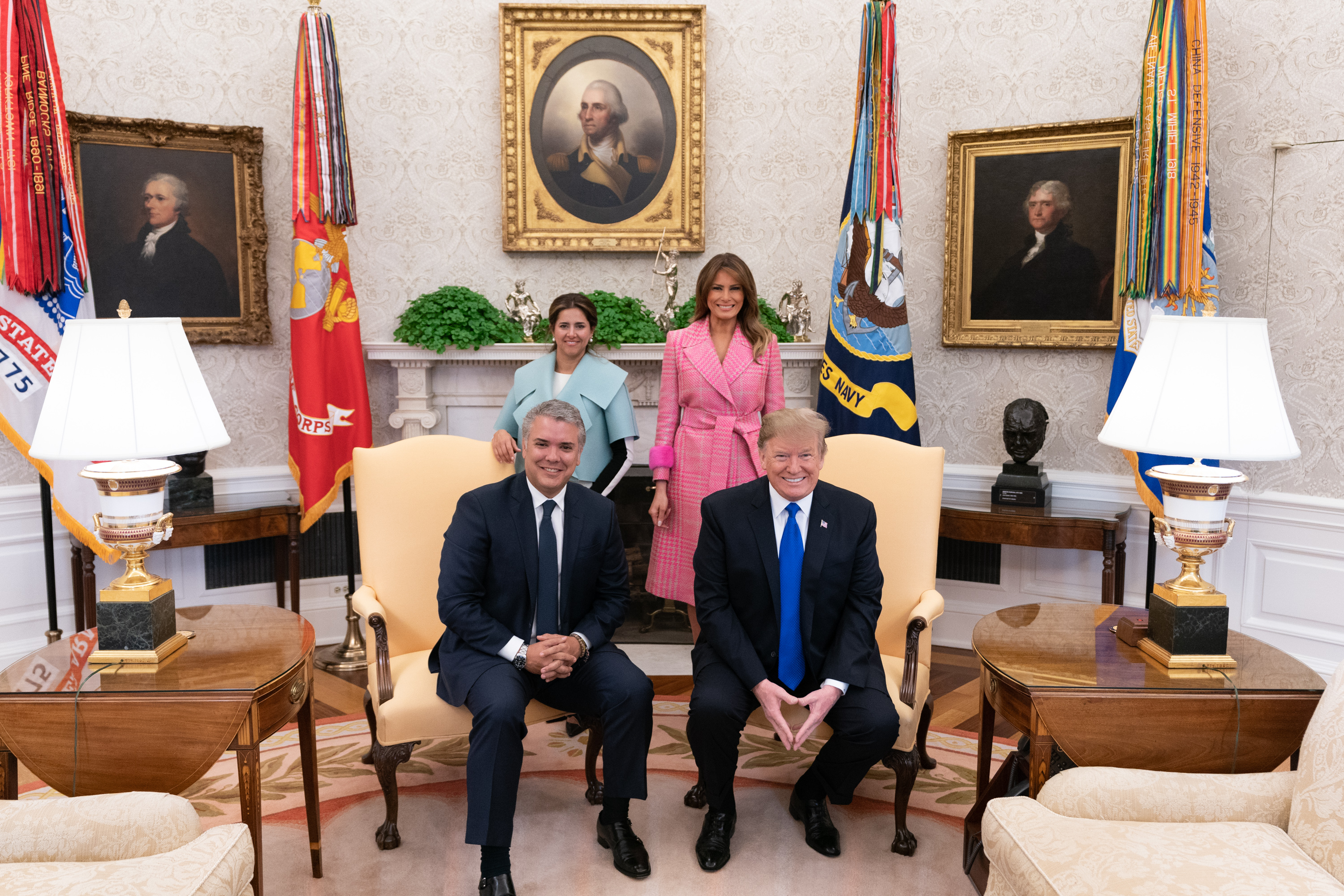
Colombian President Iván Duque with U.S. President Donald Trump in the White House, February 2019.

=== 19th century ===
On 20 July 1810, Colombia became the first Spanish colony of New Granada and the first country in South America to win independence against Spanish rule which was followed after Haiti's independence from France on 1 January 1804 after the Haitian Revolution as well as the United States to declare independence from Britain in 1783 after the American Revolution. Colombia became the third oldest independent republic in the Western Hemisphere after Haiti and the United States which won their revolutions against European imperialism. During the Spanish American wars of independence, the United States was officially neutral but permitted Spanish American agents to obtain weapons and supplies. With the reception of Manuel Torres in 1821, Colombia became the first "former" Spanish colony recognized by the United States, and the United States was the second government (after the Kingdom of Brazil) to recognize an independent Spanish American state. At that time, Gran Colombia included the territory of the present-day Colombia, Ecuador, Venezuela, and Panama. Mutual relations have existed since the U.S. established a diplomatic mission in Santa Fe de Bogota. Richard C. Anderson was appointed as the first United States Minister Plenipotentiary to the Gran Colombia on 27 January 1823. In 1824 he negotiated with the chancellor Pedro Gual and concluded the Anderson–Gual Treaty, the first bilateral treaty that the U.S. signed with another American state. Anderson took his leave from his post on 7 June 1825, after being commissioned as Envoy Extraordinary and Minister Plenipotentiary to the Panama Congress of Nations. Anderson died en route to his post in Turbaco, near Cartagena de Indias on 24 July 1826. U.S. relations with the government in Santa Fe de Bogotá were not interrupted even when Ecuador and Venezuela left the federation in 1830. In 1846, the U.S. Polk administration signed a treaty with Colombia, which owned Panama at the time. A railway across the isthmus was opened in 1855. Under the treaty, U.S. troops landed in Panama six times in the nineteenth century to crush rebellions, ensuring that the railway was not hindered.

=== Early 20th century ===
In 1903, the U.S. and Colombia negotiated a new treaty. The representative of the company which owned the railway publicly predicted and threatened that Panama would secede if the Colombian Senate rejected the treaty. In 1903, despite U.S. threats, the Colombian senate refused to ratify the Hay–Herrán Treaty. The United States encouraged an uprising of historically rebellious Panamanians and then used US warships to impede any interference from Colombia. A representative of the new Panamanian government then negotiated a treaty favorable to the U.S. for the construction and operation of the Panama Canal.

In 1928, U.S. business interests were threatened in Colombia. The workers of the U.S. corporation United Fruit banana plantations in Colombia went on strike in December 1928. The workers demanded "written contracts, eight-hour days, six-day weeks and the elimination of food coupons". After several weeks without an agreement, an army regiment from Bogotá was brought in by the Colombian government of Miguel Abadía Méndez to crush the strike. The soldiers erected their machine guns on the roofs of buildings at the corners of the main square in Ciénaga, Magdalena, closing off the access streets. After a five-minute warning, they ordered "Fuego!", opening fire into a dense crowd of plantation workers and their families who had gathered after Sunday Mass. They waited for an anticipated address from the governor of that region; between forty-seven to 2,000 workers were killed in the Santa Marta Massacre. (Note: The number of dead at the massacre has always been hotly disputed. This is in part, because the soldiers allegedly dumped the bodies of the dead into the river and put the bodies on trains.)

A populist Colombian congressman, Jorge Eliécer Gaitán, began to develop a nationwide reputation, especially among the poor, after visiting the site of the United Fruit massacre the same week. Gaitán returned to Bogotá and argued passionately in Congress in favor of the workers, arguing that the army’s actions did not protect Colombia's interests but instead those of the U.S.

=== Mid-20th century ===
In 1948, presidential candidate Gaitàn was assassinated in Bogotá during the conference that gave birth to the Organization of American States. Gaitan's assassination marked the beginning of La Violencia, a Colombian civil war which lasted until the mid-fifties and killed an estimated 300,000 Colombians. Towards the end of the conflict, Liberal and Communist armed peasant groups who remained at large, together with displaced peasants who had either fled from the violence or lost their land, formed small independent enclaves in the south. According to author Stokes, citing Jenny Pearce, these enclaves had "no broader political project" other than agriculture and self-protection. The Colombian government, pressured by Conservative Congressmen who defined these enclaves as "independent republics", saw this as a potential threat. In addition, the U.S. government saw these peasant enclaves as potentially dangerous to U.S. business interests in Colombia.

In May 1964, as part of Kennedy's Alliance for Progress, a CIA backed program called Plan LAZO was initiated. The United States trained Colombian military troops to invade the largest peasant enclaves. They used a bomber aircraft with Napalm in order to destroy the threat. Many of the armed inhabitants of the enclaves escaped and two years later part of this group formed the FARC (Revolutionary Armed Forces of Colombia). The FARC became the oldest and largest revolutionary "guerilla" movement (guerilla referring to insurgent militias inspired by the Chinese, Cuban, and Vietnamese revolutions) in the Western Hemisphere. Stokes and other critics believed that the U.S. government focused on the destruction of the FARC and other left-wing guerrilla movements, ignoring and even supporting other destabilizing elements in Colombian society.

==== 1959 "U.S. Special Survey Team" and 1962 Plan LAZO ====
As La Violencia was ending a "U.S. Special Survey Team" composed of worldwide counterinsurgency experts arrived in October 1959 to investigate Colombia's internal security. Among other policy recommendations the U.S. team advised that "in order to shield the interests of both Colombian and U.S. authorities against 'interventionist' charges any special aid given for internal security was to be sterile and covert in nature." This recommendation is a form of plausible deniability, common in secret U.S. government documents which are later declassified. (Note: Examples include: 1. The training files of the CIA's covert "Operation PBSuccess," for the 1954 coup in Guatemala. "Among the documents found in the training files of Operation PBSuccess and declassified by the Agency is a CIA document entitled "A Study of Assassination." A how-to guide book in the art of political killing, the 19-page manual offers detailed descriptions of the procedures, instruments, and implementation of assassination." The manual states that to provide plausible denial, "no assassination instructions should ever be written or recorded."; 2. CIA and White House documents on covert political intervention in the 1964 Chilean election. The CIA's Chief of Western Hemisphere Division, J.C. King, recommended that funds for the campaign "be provided in a fashion causing (Eduardo Frei Montalva president of Chile) to infer United States origin of funds and yet permitting plausible denial."; 3. The 1974–1975 Senate Church Committee conducted an investigation of the intelligence agencies. In the course of the investigation, it was revealed that the CIA, going back to the Kennedy administration, had plotted the assassination of a number of foreign rulers, including Cuba's Fidel Castro. But the president himself, who clearly was in favor of such actions, was not to be directly involved, so that he could deny knowledge of it. This was given the term plausible denial, to quote the Church Committee: "Non-attribution to the United States for covert operations was the original and principal purpose of the so-called doctrine of "plausible denial." Evidence before the Committee clearly demonstrates that this concept, designed to protect the United States and its operatives from the consequences of disclosures, has been expanded to mask decisions of the president and his senior staff members.")

In February 1962, three years after the 1959 "U.S. Special Survey Team", a Fort Bragg top-level U.S. Special Warfare team headed by Special Warfare Center commander General William P. Yarborough visited Colombia for a second survey. In a secret supplement to his report to the Joint Chiefs of Staff, Yarborough encouraged a stay-behind irregular force and its immediate deployment to eliminate communists representing a future threat:

"A concerted country team effort should be made now to select civilian and military personnel for clandestine training in resistance operations in case they are needed later. This should be done with a view toward development of a civil and military structure for exploitation in the event the Colombian internal security system deteriorates further. This structure should be used to pressure toward reforms known to be needed, perform counter-agent and counter-propaganda functions and as necessary execute paramilitary, sabotage and/or terrorist activities against known communist proponents. It should be backed by the United States... If we have such an apparatus in Colombia it should be employed now."

Interrogation procedures and techniques, including regular questioning of rural villagers "who are believed to be knowledgeable of guerrilla activities" were advised. "Exhaustive interrogation of the bandits, to include sodium pentathol and polygraph, should be used to elicit every shred of information. Both the Army and the Police need trained interrogators." Pentathol, or truth serum, was originally used by doctors for relaxation, but in the 1970s it was reported used by some Latin American militaries to induce "paralysis, agony, and terror." The use of truth serum would later be encouraged in SOA manuals.

"In general, the Yarborough team recommended that the US provide guidance and assistance in all aspects of counter-insurgency...Civilian and military personnel, clandestinely selected and trained in resistance operations, would be required in order to develop an underground civil and military structure. This organization was to undertake 'clandestine execution of plans developed by the United States Government toward defined objectives in the political, economic, and military fields'...it would…undertake...'paramilitary, sabotage, and/or terrorist activities against known communist proponents'."

Ultimately Yarborough's recommendations formed the core of a U.S.-aided reorganization of Colombian military troops. This new counter-insurgency policy debuted with Plan LAZO in 1964. Following Yarborough's recommendations, the Colombian military selected and trained civilians to work alongside the military in its counter-insurgency campaign and paramilitary "civil defense" groups which worked alongside the military. The United States supplied and trained civilian intelligence networks which were closely linked to the military. The system was established to gather "intelligence and providing early warning against bandit or guerrilla attacks". In 1965 Colombian President Guillermo León Valencia issued Decree 3398. Because of the decree, eleven separate civilian intelligence networks had been established with agricultural co-operatives. In 1968, Decree 3398 became Colombia law with the enactment of Law 48 of 1968.

Doug Stokes argues that it was not until the early part of the 1980s that the Colombian government attempted to move away from the policy of counterinsurgency warfare represented by Plan LAZO and Yarborough's 1962 recommendations.

==== 1970 US army manual ====
The 1970 U.S. army manual titled "Stability Operations" was translated into Spanish and used to train thousands of Latin American military officers in counter intelligence, including Colombian officers. Stokes argues that "the manual extends its definition of subversion beyond armed insurgents and explicitly links civil society organizations to the problem of insurgency." Targets for Counter intelligence operations included, "ordinary citizens who are typical members of organizations or associations which play an important role in the local society." (Note: An updated list with some of the same indicators listed verbatim, can be found on the Insurgent Activity Indicators, US Marine Corps. (last modified 5 June 2001).) The manual explains that insurgents usually work with union leaders and union members, and those organizations which demand "immediate social, political or economic reform may be an indication that the insurgents have gained a significant degree of control." The manual explains that the indicators of communist/insurgent infiltration include:

Refusal of peasants to pay rent, taxes, or loan payments. Increase in the number of entertainers with a political message. Discrediting the judicial system and police organizations. Characterization of the armed forces as the enemy of the people. Appearance of questionable doctrine in the educational system. Appearance of many new members in established organizations like labor organizations. Increased unrest among laborers. Increased student activity against the government and its police, or against minority groups, foreigners and the like. An increased number of articles or advertisements in newspapers criticizing the government. Strikes or work stoppages called to protest government actions. Increase of petitions demanding government redress of grievances. Proliferation of slogans pinpointing specific grievances. Initiation of letter-writing campaigns to newspapers and government officials deploring undesirable conditions and blaming individuals in power.

=== Late-20th century ===
==== Drug trade ====
Author Doug Stokes claims that there is a major discrepancy between the U.S. "stated goals of US policy and the actual targets and effects" of the war on drugs in Colombia, arguing that U.S. military assistance has been primarily directed at fighting the FARC and ELN guerrillas despite the fact that past CIA and DEA reports have identified the insurgents as minor players in the drug trade. Stokes proposes a revisionist continuity theory: that the war on drugs is a pre-text and this war, just as the Cold War that preceded it and the war on terror that followed it, was mainly about Northern Hemisphere competition to control and exploit Southern Hemisphere natural resources. In other words, "the maintenance of a world capitalist order conducive to US economic interests." As this competition for third world resources has continued even after the collapse of the Soviet Union, there would be continuity in U.S. foreign policy.

United States interventions in Colombia on behalf of the "war on drugs" saw extensive activity within Colombia during the latter half of the twentieth century. Before the 1990s and vast amounts of US spending was dedicated to combating drug production in Colombia, smaller scale operations were taking place. In the 1980s under the Drug Enforcement Agency (DEA), the US federal government oversaw investigative, covert and militant operations both in collaboration with, and against the wishes of, the independent Colombian government. Perhaps the most pressing example of these interventions, was the US involvement in the fight against Pablo Escobar. The DEA's involvement in Colombia as part of the hunt for Escobar demonstrated an important case study in the wider aspects of US-Colombian relations. With the help of the US Delta Force, extensive training, equipment and financial support, the defeat of Pablo Escobar and the Medellin Cartel marked an important moment for both the US and Colombia. The events brought into question the true effectiveness and reasonings for US involvements, their right to do so and the consequences. Mark Peceny and Michael Durnan argue that "ephemeral success" (such as the fight against Escobar, which led to further cartel driven conflicts, i.e., the Cali Cartel) and "U.S antidrug policies make it extremely difficult for the Colombian government to forge a durable public-private partnership for the management the cocaine industry". Ultimately further questioning the righteousness of US interventions in Colombian issues.

===== 1986 RAND, 1992 CIA and 1994 DEA positions =====
In 1986, the U.S. Defense Department funded a two-year study by the RAND Corporation, a private organization with a long and close relationship with the U.S. government. This study found that the use of the armed forces to interdict drugs coming into the United States would have little or no effect on cocaine trafficking and might in fact raise the profits of cocaine cartels and manufacturers. The 175-page study, "Sealing the Borders: The Effects of Increased Military Participation in Drug Interdiction," was prepared by seven researchers, mathematicians and economists at the National Defense Research Institute. The study noted that seven prior studies in the past nine years, including one by the Center for Naval Research and the Office of Technology Assessment, had come to similar conclusions. Interdiction efforts using current armed forces resources would have almost no effect on cocaine importation into the United States, the report concluded.

President George Bush Sr. disagreed, arguing that "the logic is simple. The cheapest way to eradicate narcotics is to destroy them at their source....We need to wipe out crops wherever they are grown and take out labs wherever they exist."

During the early- to mid-1990s, the Clinton administration ordered and funded a major cocaine policy study, again by RAND. The Rand Drug Policy Research Center study concluded that $3 billion should be switched from federal and local law enforcement to treatment. The report said that treatment is the cheapest way to cut drug use, stating that drug treatment is twenty-three times more effective than the supply-side "war on drugs". President Clinton's drug czar's office disagreed with slashing law enforcement spending.

A 1992 Central Intelligence Agency report acknowledged that "the FARC had become increasingly involved in drugs through their 'taxing' of the trade in areas under their geographical control and that in some cases the insurgents protected trafficking infrastructure to further fund their insurgency." The report also described the relationship between the FARC and the drug traffickers as one "characterized by both cooperation and friction". The 1992 report concluded by stating "we do not believe that the drug industry [in Colombia] would be substantially disrupted in the short term by attacks against guerillas. Indeed, many traffickers would probably welcome, and even assist, increased operations against insurgents."

In 1994, the DEA came to three similar conclusions. First, that any connections between drug trafficking organizations and Colombian insurgents were "ad hoc 'alliances of convenience'". Second, that "the independent involvement of insurgents in Colombia's domestic drug productions, transportation, and distribution is limited…there is no evidence that the national leadership of either the FARC or the ELN has directed, as a matter of policy, that their respective organizations directly engage in independent illicit drug production, transportation, or distribution." (Note: "Some officials in the United States and Colombia have accused the FARC of becoming directly involved in refining and exporting cocaine on the international market. Many experts, including Klaus Nyholm, Director of the United Nations Drug Control Program in Colombia, maintain that the accusations against the FARC are unfounded.") Third, the report determined that the DEA "has no evidence that the FARC or ELN have been involved in the transportation, distribution, or marketing of illegal drugs in the United States. Furthermore it is doubtful that either insurgent group could develop the international transportation and logistics infrastructure necessary to establish independent drug distribution in the United States or Europe…the DEA believes that the insurgents never will be major players in Colombia's drug trade."

===== 2000 AUC participation =====
In 2000, former paramilitary leader Carlos Castaño Gil, the founder of the AUC who disappeared in 2004, revealed on national television how the AUC funded its operations: "drug trafficking and drug traffickers probably finance 70%. The rest come largely from extortion."

==== Counterterrorism ====
Both before and after 11 September 2001, the U.S. government provided military and economic aid to Colombia for the purposes of counterinsurgency and counterterrorism, in addition to its Drug War assistance.

In 1999, the U.S. State Department began sharing real-time intelligence about the guerrillas with the Colombian military. Officials told the Washington Post that they feared "Colombia is losing its war against Marxist-led insurgents."

In May 2001, the Bush administration introduced the Andean Regional Initiative (ARI), which broadened U.S. intervention throughout the entire region, directing another $800 million to the project over Plan Colombia. The ARI supplies military support and economic assistance to seven Andean countries: Bolivia, Brazil, Colombia, Ecuador, Panama, Peru, and Venezuela.

After 11 September 2001, U.S. government officials compared the FARC with Osama bin Ladin, describing both of them as terrorists. (Note: Secretary of State Colin Powell compared the FARC to Al-Queda stating that "And so there's no difficulty in identifying him [Osama bin Ladin] as a terrorist and getting everybody to rally against him. Now, there are other organizations that probably meet a similar standard. The FARC in Colombia comes to mind." Florida Senator Bob Graham stated: "The FARC are doing the same thing as global-level terrorists, that is organizing in small cells that don't have contact with each other and depend on a central command to organize attacks, in terms of logistics and finance. It is the same style of operation as bin Laden." The Assistant Secretary of State, Rand Beers argued under oath that "It is believed that FARC terrorists have received training in Al Qaida terrorist camps in Afghanistan", which he later admitted was a lie.) Senator John McCain stated that the United States now "abandons any fictional distinctions between counter-narcotic and counter-insurgency operations". Author Doug Stokes has criticized this, stating that "in the aftermath of September 11th the U.S. has dropped the pretence that its military assistance has been driven solely by counter-narcotics concerns and has now started to overtly couch its funding in terms of a strategy of counter-terrorism targeted at the FARC, who are now being linked to international terrorism as well as drug trafficking."

In July 2002, "the U.S. Congress passed an emergency supplemental spending bill that lifted a previous provision limiting U.S. assistance to counter-narcotics efforts. Under the new rules, U.S. security assistance can be used against 'organizations designated as terrorist organizations...'". According to Amnesty International, "the new U.S. strategy makes U.S. assistance to Colombia available for counter-insurgency activities for the first time, including direct action against armed groups. The U.S. is now providing military aid for direct use in counter-insurgency operations specifically to protect U.S.-operated oil installations, such as Caño Limón." (Note: "Funds available to the Dept. of State for assistance to the Government of Colombia shall be available to support a unified campaign against narcotics trafficking, against activities by organizations designated as terrorist organizations such as the Revolutionary Armed Forces of Colombia ("FARC"), the National Liberation Army ("ELN"), and the United Self-Defense Forces of Colombia ("AUC"), and to take actions to protect human health and welfare in emergency circumstances, including undertaking rescue operations.") The spending bill included the U.S. Congress approval of a provision coined as 'expanded authorities,' whereby U.S. supplied training and equipment could be used in counter-terrorism efforts as well as counter-drug efforts.

In November 2002, as part of what has been called "a significant shift in American policy", the U.S. began sending advisors to Colombia under a $94 million counterinsurgency program to protect five hundred miles of an oil pipeline.

In 2006, a U.S. congressional report listed a number of PMCs and other enterprises that have signed contracts to carry out anti-narcotics operations and related activities as part of Plan Colombia. DynCorp was among those contracted by the State Department, while others signed contracts with the Defense Department. Other companies from different countries, including Israel, have also signed contracts with the Colombian Defense Ministry to carry out security or military activities.

School of the Americas

The School of the Americas is a U.S. training center for Latin American military officers, that since its 1946 establishment in Panama, has trained 82,767 Latin American officers in counter-insurgency doctrine and combat skills. Colombia was one of the first countries to send military officers to the SOA. According to journalist Grace Livingstone, as of 2003 more Colombian SOA graduates have been identified as alleged human rights abusers than SOA graduates from any other Latin American country. This is in part because the names and records of Colombian officers have been under greater scrutiny than those of officers elsewhere in Latin America.

In 1996, after years of denials the U.S. Pentagon declassified translated excerpts from seven training manuals. (Note: The entire manuals were declassified in 2004 and can be now found at Prisoner Abuse: Patterns from the Past, The National Security Archive.) These manuals were prepared by the U.S. military and used between 1987 and 1991 for intelligence training courses at the U.S. Army School of the Americas. The manuals were also distributed by Special Forces Mobile Training teams to military personnel and intelligence schools in Colombia, Ecuador, El Salvador, Guatemala, and Peru. The manuals taught counterintelligence agents to use "fear, payment of bounties for enemy dead, beatings, false imprisonment, executions and the use of truth serum". The manual titled "Handling of Sources" teaches, "The CI [counterintelligence] agent could cause the arrest of the employees [informants] parents, imprison the employee or give him a beating" to enforce cooperation.

In a 1981 study, human rights researcher Lars Schoultz concluded that U.S. aid "has tended to flow disproportionately to Latin American governments which torture their citizens...to the hemisphere's relatively egregious violators of fundamental human rights." In 1998, Latin American professor Martha Huggins stated "that the more foreign police aid given (by the United States), the more brutal and less democratic the police institutions and their governments become."

===== Paramilitaries =====
In 2003, author Grace Livingstone described Colombian paramilitaries as "various types of illegal rightwing armed groups which work alongside the armed forces. They include private militia funded by landowners and business; drug traffickers' hit squads and 'social cleansing' death squads. The largest paramilitary network is the Autodefensas Unidas de Colombia (AUC)." Paramilitaries were considered responsible for three quarters of all Colombian political killings between 1995 and 2001, (Note: When attempting to get support for Plan Colombia, Drug Czar Barry McCaffrey's claimed on NPR's "Talk of the Nation" that the guerrillas, not the paramilitaries, were responsible for the majority of the Colombian human rights abuses.) 52% of the massacres in 1998 (guerrillas were responsible for 20%), and 49% of the refugee displacements in 1999 (guerrillas are responsible for 29%). In 2003, The Guardian's columnist George Monbiot stated that "over the past 10 years, the paramilitaries [which the Colombian army] works with have killed some 15,000 trades unionists, peasant and indigenous leaders, human rights workers, land reform activists, leftwing politicians and their sympathizers."

The paramilitaries often target union leaders, members of the civil society and human rights workers. On 28 September 2000, the AUC, Colombia's largest paramilitary group, issued a press release stating that "the AUC identifies the human rights workers and especially members of Credhos as guerrilla sympathizers, and for this reason from this moment forward we consider them military targets of our organization." (Note: Credhos is the regional human rights organization.)

U.S. Corporations have also been implicated in the financing of paramilitary groups. The most well known case may be Chiquita Brands International, which has admitted to making payments to the AUC from 1997 to 2004. Due to this involvement with a terrorist organization, Chiquita's board members have even been requested in extradition.

====== 1990 intelligence networks ======
In 1990, the U.S. created a fourteen-member team whose members included representatives of the CIA, the U.S. Southern Command, U.S. Embassy's Military Group, and the Defense Intelligence Agency (produces intelligence for the United States Department of Defense). This was done in order to give advice on the reshaping of several of the Colombian military's local intelligence networks. The stated reason for this restructuring was to aid the Colombian military in their counter-narcotics efforts. Years later, Col. James S. Roach, Jr., who was the Defense Intelligence Agency (DIA) country liaison and U.S. Military Attache in Bogotá during the meetings, told Human Rights Watch (HRW) that: "The intent [of the meeting] was not to be associated with paramilitaries. But we knew from Colombian news reports and [even] from Colombian military reports that they were still working with paramilitaries."

The result of these meetings was Order 200-05/91, which was issued by the Colombian Defense Ministry in May 1991. HRW obtained a copy of the Colombian Armed Forces Directive No. 200-05/91. The report makes no explicit mention of illegal narcotics. The Colombian armed forces, "based on the recommendations made by a commission of advisors from the U.S. Armed Forces," presented a plan to better combat "escalating terrorism by armed subversion."

In 1996, HRW concluded that "Order 200-05/91 laid the groundwork for continuing an illegal, covert partnership between the military and paramilitaries and demonstrates that this partnership was promoted by the military high command in violation of [Colombian] Decree 1194, (Note: In Jun. 1994, Decree 1194, established criminal penalties for members of the armed forces and civilians who finance, organize, lead, promote, recruit, train, or belong to "the armed groups, misnamed paramilitary groups, that have been formed into death squads, bands of hired assassins, self-defense groups, or groups that carry out their own justice.") which prohibits such contact. Although the term "paramilitaries" is not used in the order, the document lays out a system similar to the one present under the name of MAS and its military patrons in the Middle Magdalena." (Note: "Muerte a Secuestradores, Death to Kidnappers. MAS was formed by drug traffickers in 1981. The name was also adopted by army-organized paramilitaries in the Middle Magdalena region, some of which later allied with drug traffickers. The name is now generic and is used throughout Colombia by paramilitary groups.") HRW argued that the restructuring process solidified linkages between members of the Colombian military and civilian members of paramilitary groups by incorporating them into several of the local intelligence networks and by cooperating with their activities. For HRW, the resulting situation allowed the Colombian government and military to plausibly deny links or responsibility for human rights abuses committed by members or associates of these networks. HRW considered that the intelligence networks created by the U.S. reorganization appeared to have increased violence, citing massacres in Barrancabermeja as an example.

====== Military-paramilitary links ======
In 1999, a U.S. Department of State annual report stated that "government forces continued to commit numerous, serious abuses, including extrajudicial killings, at a level that was roughly similar to that of 1998. Despite some prosecutions and convictions, the authorities rarely brought officers of the security forces and the police charged with human rights offenses to justice, and impunity remains a problem. At times the security forces collaborated with paramilitary groups that committed abuses; in some instances, individual members of the security forces actively collaborated with members of paramilitary groups by passing them through roadblocks, sharing intelligence, and providing them with ammunition. Paramilitary forces find a ready support base within the military and police, as well as local civilian elites in many areas."

In 1997, Amnesty International (AI) opined that the war on drugs is "a myth", stating that members of Colombian security forces worked closely with paramilitaries, landlords and narco-traffickers to target political opposition, community leaders, human rights and health workers, union activists, students, and peasants. Amnesty International reported that "almost every Colombian military unit that Amnesty implicated in murdering civilians two years ago [1995] was doing so with U.S.-supplied weapons".

In 2000, studies carried out by both the United Nations and Human Rights Watch argued that paramilitaries continued to maintain close ties to the Colombian military. HRW considered that the existing partnership between paramilitaries and members of the Colombian military was "a sophisticated mechanism, in part supported by years of advice, training, weaponry, and official silence by the United States, that allows the Colombian military to fight a dirty war and Colombian officialdom to deny it." A contemporary UN report states that "The security forces also failed to take action, and this undoubtedly enabled the paramilitary groups to achieve their exterminating objectives."

==== Cooperation System of the American Air Forces ====
Colombia is an active member of the Cooperation System of the American Air Forces (SICOFAA).

==== 1995–1997 diplomatic crisis ====
Between 1996 and 1997 Bill Clinton's administration decertified Colombia after then President of Colombia, Ernesto Samper was involved in an investigation for allegedly accepting money from drug cartels for his presidential campaign. The media reported Colombia's 'Cuba-nisation' in Washington as United States policy makers constantly called for the isolation of Colombian president Samper. Colombia was officially branded as a 'threat to democracy' and to the United States.

Until mid-2004, the U.S. Embassy in Bogota was the largest U.S. embassy in the world.

=== 21st century ===
In 2013, the government of Colombia had expressed aspirations to eventually join the U.S.-led NATO military alliance. President Juan Manuel Santos stated, "In June, NATO will sign an agreement with the Colombian government, with the Defense Ministry, to start the process of rapprochement and cooperation, with an eye toward also joining that organization." In response, then US assistant secretary of state Roberta Jacobson noted, "Our goal is certainly to support Colombia as being a capable and strong member of lots of different international organizations, and that might well include NATO."

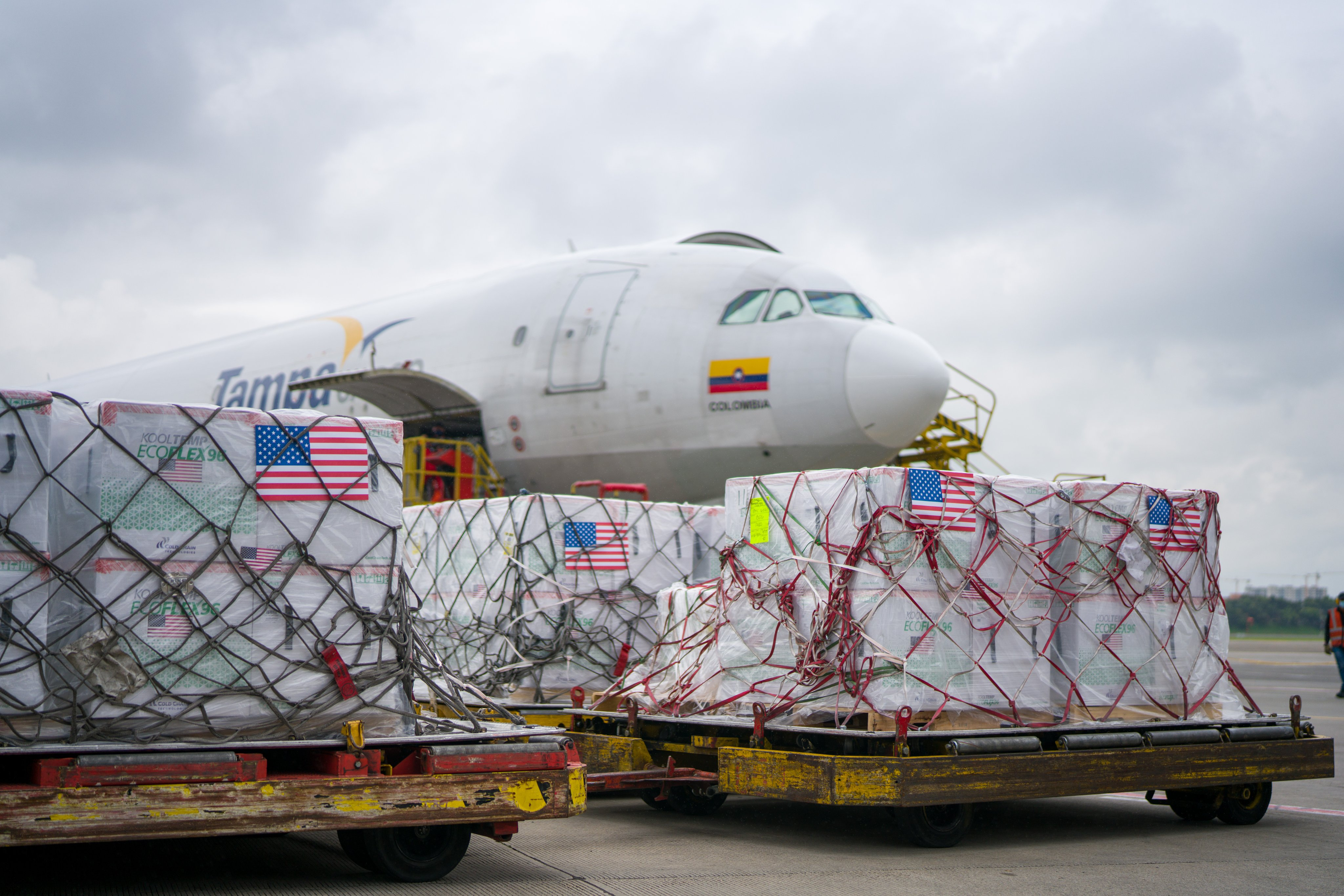
The US delivers Moderna COVID-19 vaccines to Colombia as part of the COVAX program in 2021

On 1 March 2018, the United States and Colombia decided to continue their partnership that works to better develop and facilitate both countries economies with new opportunities, environmental protection, and efforts to decrease the trade of narcotics. This deal created partnerships between the United States and Colombia that protect Colombia's environment by working to preserve biodiversity, punishing animal traffickers, and limiting illegal gold mining that is destroying Colombia's environment and is harmful to human health. This bilateral agreement also promotes Colombia's economy by creating more job opportunities, funding education and student exchanges, increasing business relations between the two countries by promoting the growth of businesses in Colombia, and encouraging the production of legal crops in Colombia. In this deal the United States also addressees human rights violations in Colombia by carrying out the prosecution of human rights violators. Lastly, it deals with the exchange of narcotics with the agreement to strengthen efforts to eliminate the drug trade by putting in place new restrictions and barriers that will hopefully decrease the cocaine and coca cultivation by 50 in five years.

==== Second Trump presidency ====
In January 2025, a dispute arose between Colombia and the United States after Colombian President Gustavo Petro refused to allow two U.S. military aircraft each carrying around 80 deported Colombian nationals to land as part of the mass deportation operations under the Second Trump Presidency. According to Reuters, a U.S. official said military planes had not been used to fly migrants out of the country in recent memory, and the Associated Press reported that Colombia had "accepted 475 deportation flights from the U.S. from 2020 to 2024" on civilian aircraft. Petro cited undignified treatment of the deportees, saying on X that he would welcome deportation flights of civilian planes; he also offered use of his presidential plane. In response to the refusal of permission, U.S. President Donald Trump moved to impose emergency 25% tariffs — to be doubled to 50% if Petro did not reverse his decision within a week — on all Colombian imports; travel bans and visa revocations for Colombian government officials; and enhanced customs and border protection inspections for all Colombian nationals and cargo from Colombia. The U.S. embassy in Bogota suspended visa processing. Petro responded by ordering a 25% tariff on U.S. imports, threatening an increase of 50%. According to CNN, this was the first instance of "Trump using economic pressure to force other nations to fall in line with his mass deportation plans since he took office." Hours later, White House Press Secretary Karoline Leavitt stated that the government of Colombia had agreed to "unrestricted acceptance" of returning migrants from the U.S., and would explicitly accept returns on military aircraft. The tariff orders will be "held in reserve, and not signed", while other restrictions would remain in place "until the first planeload of Colombian deportees is successfully returned.". Per NBC, Luis Gilberto Murillo, Colombia's Foreign Affairs Minister, "said in remarks delivered in Spanish that the country 'will continue to receive Colombians deported, guaranteeing them dignified conditions as citizens subject to rights.'"

In July 2025, following allegation that the US was looking to interfere in Colombia including an alleged coup, both countries recalled their ambassadors. A week later both diplomats returned.

In September 2025, during Petro's visit to the UN, following increased criticism by Petro over US strikes on Venezuelan boats and support for Israel, the Department of State tweeted that it would revoke Petro's visa. Petro who is an Italian citizen does not need a visa to travel to the US. During a protest outside the UN, Petro said "I ask all the soldiers of the United States Army not to point their guns at humanity. Disobey the orders of Trump. Obey the orders of humanity". Petro has called for the formation of a “World Salvation Army” whose first task would be the liberation of Palestine. In early October 2025, Petro said that a boat recently bombed by the United States was "Colombian with Colombian citizens" on board, a claim the White House called "baseless." The US has targeted at least four boats in the Caribbean in recent weeks, saying the attacks targeted drug traffickers but has not provided any evidence or details about who or what was on the boats. Trump later called Petro an "illegal drug leader", and announced that he would cut funding to and impose tariffs on Colombia. Following Trumps comments, Colombia's ambassador to the US was recalled. The Trump administration then imposed sanctions on Petro for allegedly failing to stop the cartels. Petro said he had significantly reduced the growth rate of coca plantations in Colombia, implying that the drug trade was not the main motive behind the US sanctions.

Trump saying "I hear Colombia (...) is making cocaine. (...) anybody that's doing that and selling it into our country is subject to attack." in a December 2025 Cabinet Meeting

In October 2025, the United States Department of the Treasury announced sanctions against Colombian President Gustavo Petro and Interior Minister Armando Benedetti under Executive Order 14059, citing their alleged involvement in illicit drug trafficking activities. According to the Office of Foreign Assets Control (OFAC), two officials, along with several associates, were added to the Specially Designated Nationals and Blocked Persons List (SDN). The Treasury Department's statement alleged that these individuals “materially assisted, sponsored, or provided financial, material, or technological support for, or goods or services in support of, international narcotics trafficking.” These measures marked a significant deterioration in bilateral relations, with the Colombian government condemning the decision as politically motivated and labeling it “an act of aggression” against its sovereignty. Analysts described the move as one of the most severe diplomatic escalations between Bogotá and Washington in recent years.

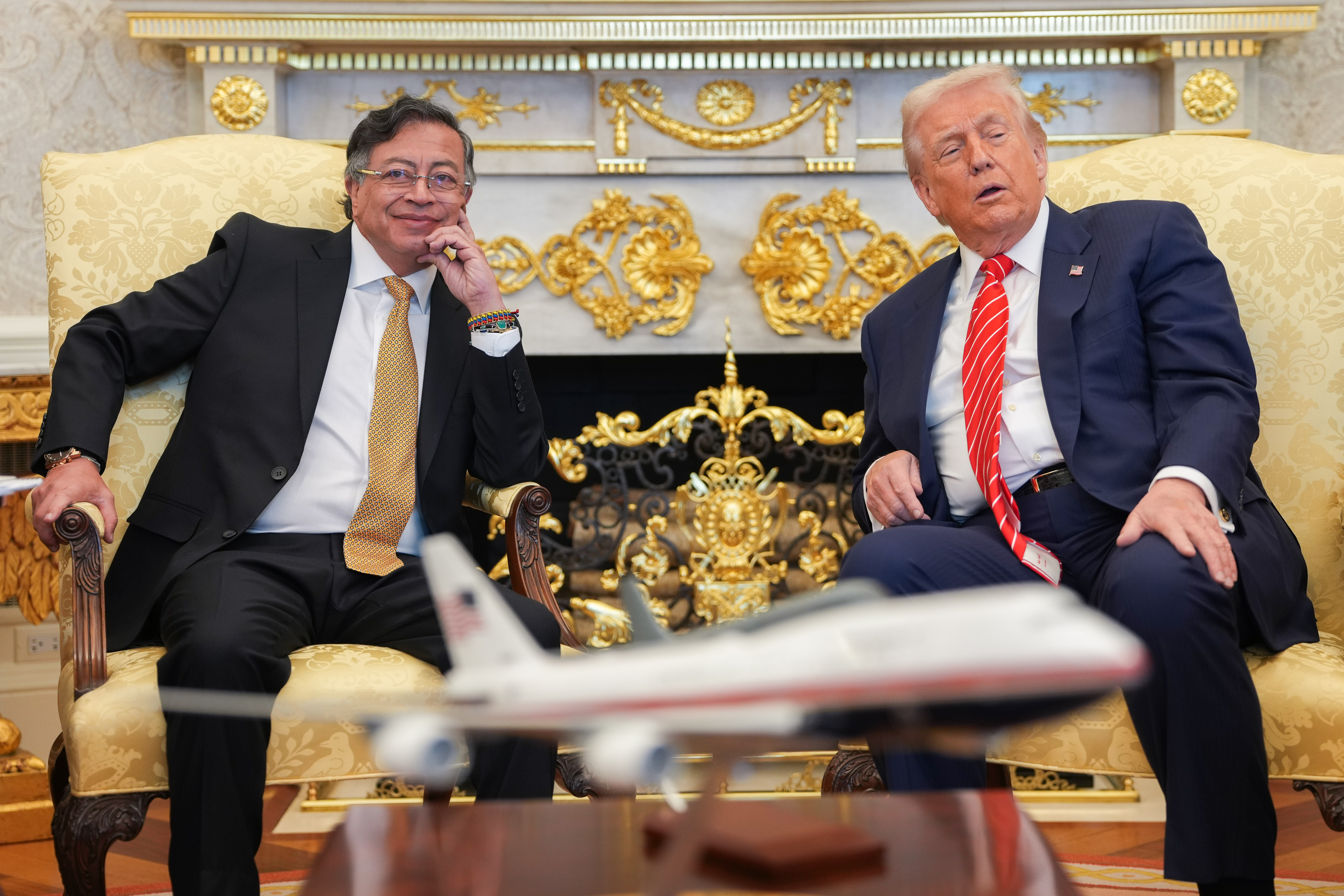
Gustavo Petro and Donald Trump in February 2026

In January 2026, following 2026 United States strikes in Venezuela that captured Venezuelan president Nicolás Maduro, Trump said, about Petro, "He's making cocaine and they're sending it into the United States, so he does have to watch his ass". Trump said "Columbia is very sick too, run by a sick man who likes making cocaine and selling it to the United States. And he's not going to be doing it very long, let me tell you". Asked "So there will be an operation by the U.S.?", Trump responded "It sounds good to me". There is no evidence that Petro is involved in the cocaine trade. Petro had criticized the operation into Venezuela as an act of "aggression against the sovereignty of Venezuela and of Latin America" and called for immediate meetings of the United Nations and Organization of American States. He also called on Latin American countries to unite, otherwise they will be "treated like servants and slaves." Following a call between Petro and Trump, Trump posted: "I appreciated his call and tone, and look forward to meeting him in the near future." During Operation Southern Spear undertaken by the United States, and especially after the capture of Nicholas Maduro, U.S. president Donald Trump has threatened to take military action against Colombia and against President Petro.

In the 2026 presidential election, Donald Trump endorsed Abelardo de la Espriella, who was elected president after defeating Iván Cepeda in a narrow runoff. In November 2026, The New York Times reported that Colombia would not "allow the United States to conduct joint military operations" while "cooperation between the two countries remains strong."

== Interpretations of US role ==
According to author Robin Kirk, most Americans in 2003 remained naïve about the role of the United States in Colombia's historical development and the nation's continuing violence.

Colombia's own history has been studied from the perspective of the so-called "violentologist", a new type of social scientist created in order to analyze the nature and development of the country's violence. In 1999, Camilo Azcarate has attributed the violence to three main causes:

- A weak central state,
- Poverty, and an
- Elite political system which excludes the less affluent of society.

Doug Stokes argued in 2005 that, along with the other factors, the past and present interference of successive American administrations in Colombian affairs had often sought to preserve a measure of stability in Colombia, by upholding a political and economic status quo understood as favorable to U.S. interests even at the cost of contributing to promoting greater instability for the majority of the Colombian population.

However, other studies on the influence to Colombian domestic agenda from US military aid have demonstrated other results. In contrast to the stereotypical belief that foreign aid should strengthen a weak state's governing capacity or reduce violence, US military assistance may have actually worsened domestic violence in Colombia by introducing a higher level of paramilitary attacks as well as decreasing anti-narcotic operations. Also, empirical evidence suggests that US aid does not help reduce violence related to the production of drug crops such as coca.

== Public opinions ==
According to the 2012 U.S. Global Leadership Report, 47% of Colombians approved of U.S. leadership, with 23% of the people disapproving and 29% remaining percentage uncertain; the sixth-highest rating of the U.S. for any surveyed country in the Americas. In a survey in 2015, the image of President Obama's favorability was 78% among Colombians. According to a 2026 Pew Research Center survey, 60% of Colombians had a favorable view of the United States, while 35% had a negative view.

== Diplomatic missions ==
of Colombia in the United States

- Washington, D.C. (Embassy)
- Atlanta (Consulate-General)
- Boston (Consulate-General)
- Chicago (Consulate-General)
- Houston (Consulate-General)
- Los Angeles (Consulate-General)
- Miami (Consulate-General)
- Newark (Consulate-General)
- New York City (Consulate-General)
- Orlando (Consulate-General)
- San Francisco (Consulate-General)
- San Juan, Puerto Rico (Consulate-General)

of the United States in Colombia

- Bogotá (Embassy)

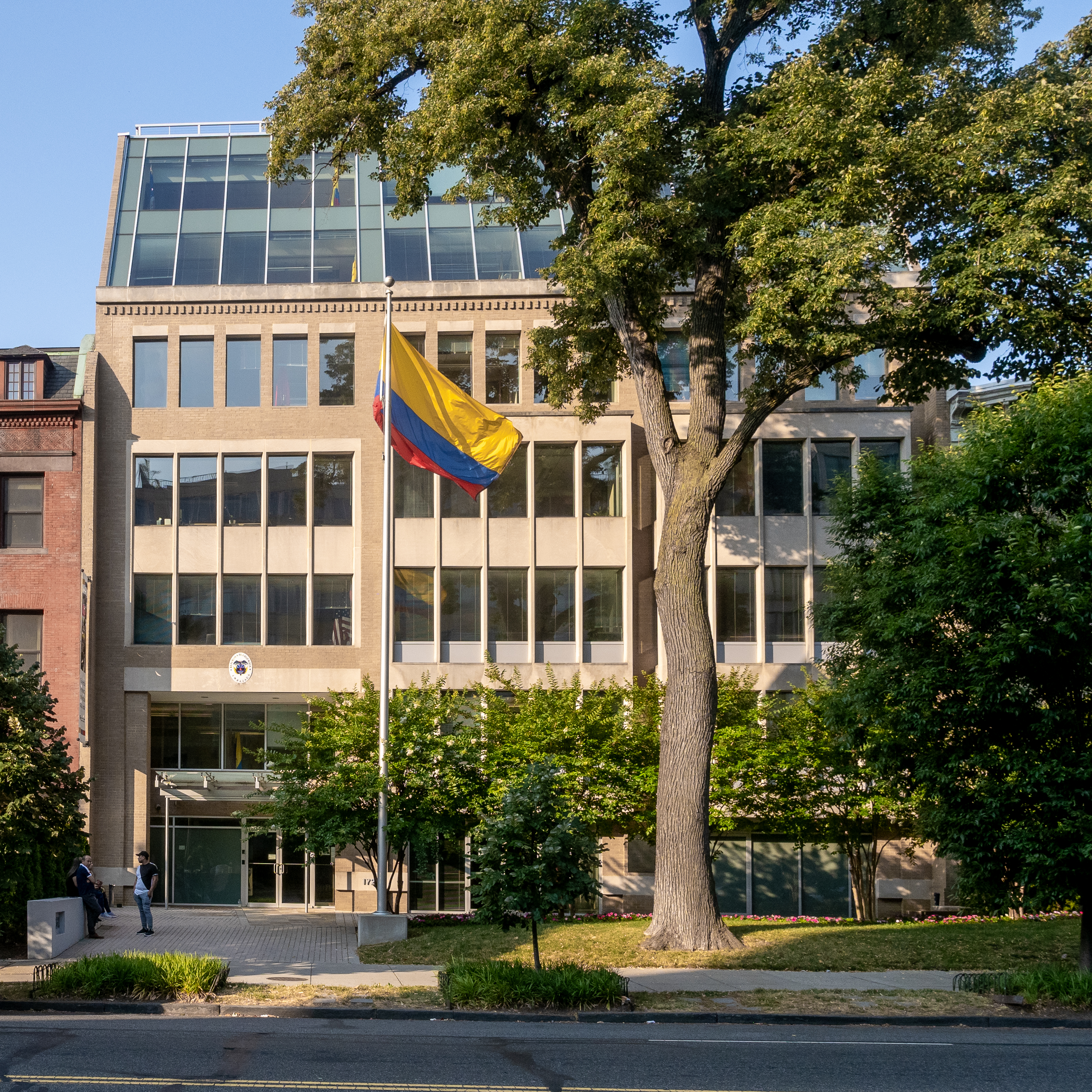
Embassy of Colombia in Washington, D.C.

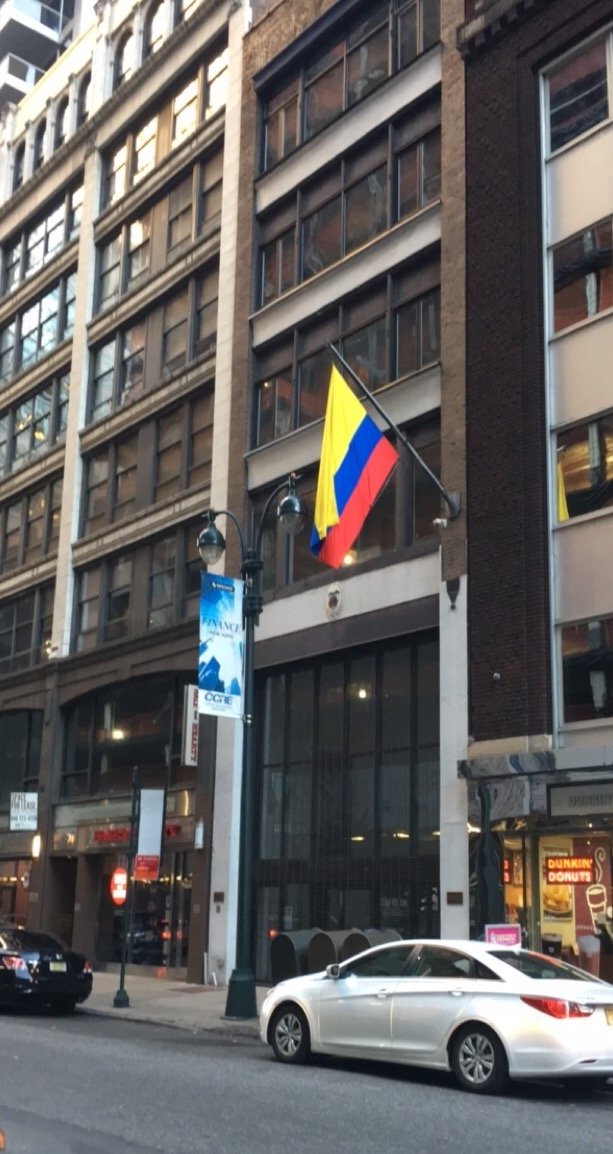
Consulate-General of Colombia in New York City

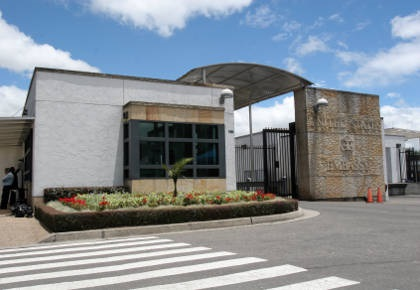
Embassy of the United States in Bogotá

== See also ==
- Latin America–United States relations
- Foreign relations of Colombia
- Foreign relations of the United States
- Right-wing paramilitarism in Colombia
- CIA activities in Colombia
