= Embassy of Colombia, Washington, D.C. =

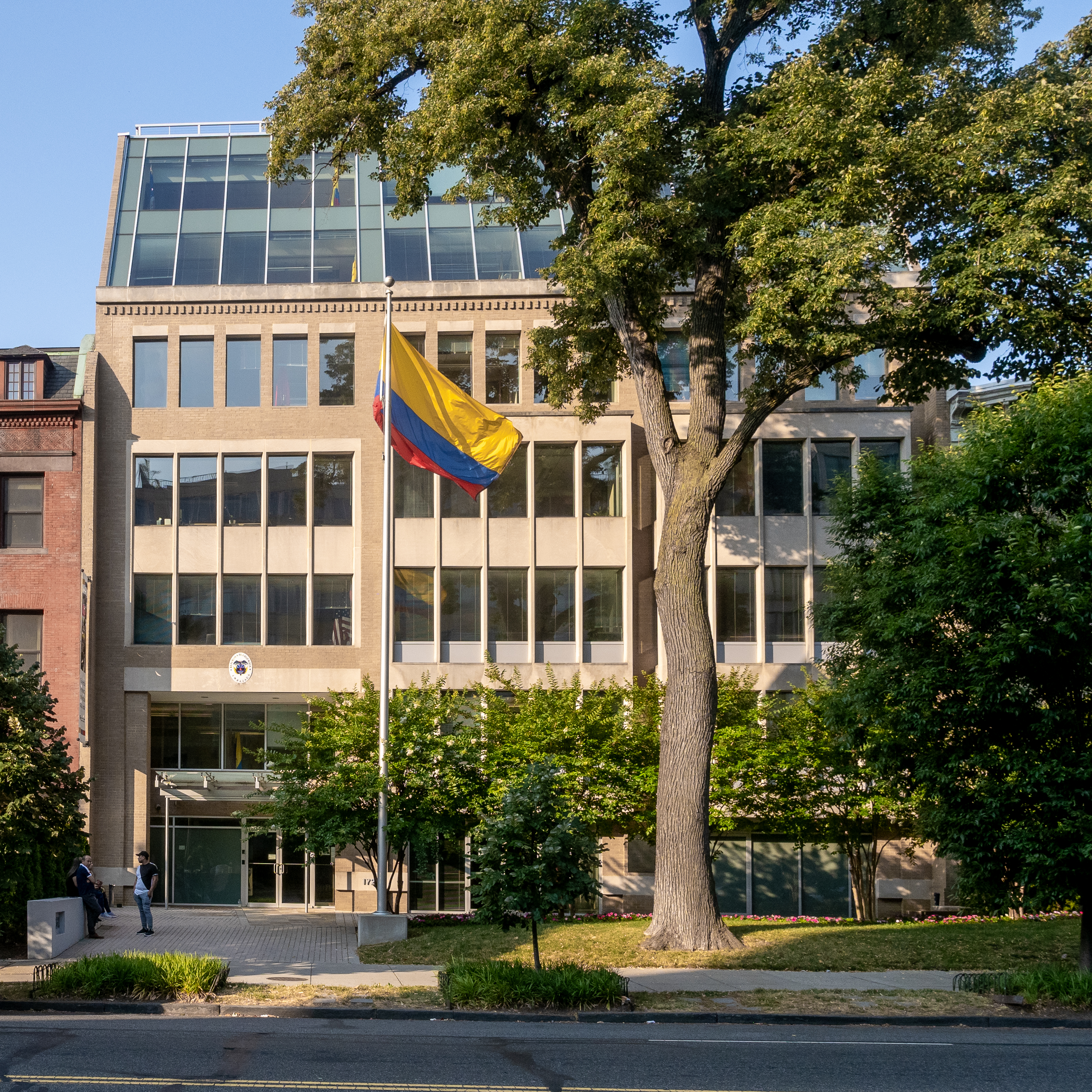
- Location: Kalorama
- Address: 1724 Massachusetts Ave NW, Washington, D.C., 20036 United States
- Coordinates: 38°54′38.91″N 77°02′41.83″W
- Ambassador: Francisco Santos Calderon

The Embassy of Colombia in Washington, D.C. is the Republic of Colombia's diplomatic mission to the United States. The building is located at 1724 Massachusetts Avenue NW on Embassy Row.

== See also ==
- Colombia–United States relations
- List of Washington, D.C. embassies
- Thomas T. Gaff House
