= High Commissioner for Peace =

The Office of the High Commissioner for Peace (Spanish: Alto Comisionado Para la Paz) is a political office in the Executive Branch of Colombia

== List of high commissioners ==
#	Ambassadors	Term start	Term end
1st	Carlos Holmes Trujillo García	7 August 1994	8 August 1995
2nd	Daniel García-Peña Jaramillo	8 August 1995	7 August 1998
3rd	Víctor Guillermo Ricardo Piñeros	7 August 1998	10 May 2000
4th	Camilo Gómez Alzate	10 May 2000	7 August 2002
5th	Luis Carlos Restrepo Ramírez	7 August 2002	5 February 2006
6th	Frank Joseph Pearl González	5 February 2006	31 July 2010
7th	Sergio Jaramillo Caro	September 2010	August 2017
8th	Rodrigo Rivera Salazar	August 2017	August 2018
9th	Miguel Ceballos	August 2018	May 2021
10th	Juan Camilo Restrepo Gómez	May 2021	August 2022
11th	Iván Danilo Rueda	August 2022	November 2023
12th	Otty Patiño Hormaza	December 2023	August 2026
