= Sergio Jaramillo Caro =

Colombian diplomat, philosopher and politician (born 1966)

Sergio Jaramillo
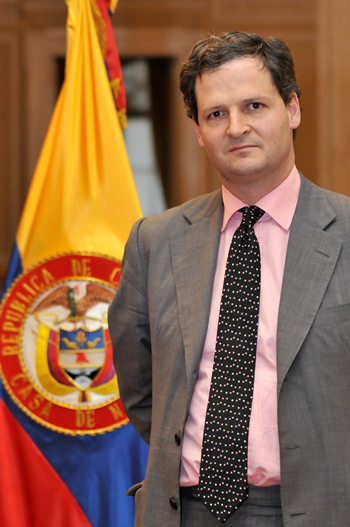

High Commissioner for Peace
- In office September 18, 2012 – July 21, 2017
- President: Juan Manuel Santos
- Preceded by: Frank Pearl González
- Succeeded by: Rodrigo Rivera Salazar

Personal details
- Born: Sergio Jaramillo Caro; October 17, 1966 (age 59) Bogotá, D.C., Colombia
- Relatives: Miguel Antonio Caro (great-grandfather)
- Education: University of Toronto; Oxford University; Cambridge University; Heidelberg University

Sergio Jaramillo Caro (born October 17, 1966) is a Colombian diplomat, philosopher and politician. From 2006 to 2009, he served as Vice Minister of Defense for Politics and International Affairs, during the administration of Álvaro Uribe, then from 2012 to 2017 he served as National Security Advisor from 2010 to 2012, and later as High Commissioner for Peace during the administration of Juan Manuel Santos From 2017 to 2018, Jaramillo was Ambassador of Colombia to the European Union and Belgium.

== Studies ==
He studied philosophy at the University of Toronto and philology at the University of Oxford. He received a master's degree in philosophy from the University of Cambridge and was a candidate for a doctorate in Greek at Heidelberg University in Germany. He speaks fluent Spanish, English, German and French. He also speaks Italian and Russian.

== Civil service ==
From 2000 to 2001, he worked in Cancillería, where minister Guillermo Fernández Soto named him his advisor for the Diplomacy for Peace program.

From 2001 to 2002, he was a political counselor for the Colombian embassy in France, where he worked with ambassadors Juan Camilo Restrepo and Marta Lucía Ramírez.

From 2002 to 2004, he was the advisor of political issues and strategies for the ministry of national defense for Marta Lucía Ramírez, where he was in charge of development, the coordination, and writing of The Political Defense and Democratic Security from 2002 to 2003

Between 2004 and 2006, Jaramillo stopped work as a civil servant and became an executive director of the Ideas for Peace Foundation (Fundación Ideas para la Paz (FIP)). As such, he was in charge of leading a work team that published the series Siguiendo el Conflicto (Following Conflict) which reached great influence within Colombian armed conflict analysis. He published 45 issues of that series. Before leaving the leadership of FIP, he published an article in the newspaper, El Tiempo, that analysed the impact of the pressure of losses and casualties within the FMM and its dangerous consequences.

Between 2006 and 2009, Jaramillo worked with Juan Manuel Santos as vice minister for human rights and international issues at the defense ministry. His work focused on reporting false positives within the army, prompting the prosecutor's office to undertake the investigations of homicides and to exclude military justice. His role was key in the later expulsion of a group of 27 high officers in the army ranks. He came up with human rights policies that regulated force. He was a defender of the consolidation policy with a civilian approach. He was also a major proponent of demobilisation policies.

Between 2009 and 2010, he was the investigator for the Andes University faculty administration. There he led the creation of the group Amigos de La Macarena as a mechanism to draw bridges between private business and the policy of territorial consolidation.

Between 2010 and 2012, Jaramillo took charge as the senior presidential national security adviser of the Santos government. In this position, he propelled the reactivation of the National Security Council where there was a special emphasis against the criminal bands (bacrim) and in the strengthening of the policy of territorial consolidation. During this period, he was also the High Commissioner for Peace.

Between 2010 and the public announcement in September 2012, he was the head of the government team in charge of leading the approaches and exploratory phase of conversations with FARC.

He was responsible for the secret negotiations that brought the approval of "the general agreement for the ending of conflict" between the Colombian government and the guerrilla warfare of the FARC in August 2012. He was also part of the government delegation in the conversations in Havana.

In September 2012, he was designated high commissioner of peace along with Humberto de la Calle, chief negotiator of the national government. He was in charge of leading conceptual strategy of all processes with FARC until August 2016.

In June 2023, he was injured when two Russian ballistic missiles struck a dining café in Kramatorsk, Ukraine where he was meeting Ukrainian writer Victoria Amelina, who later died as a result of her injuries.
