= Luis Gilberto Murillo =

Colombian diplomat and mining engineer (born 1967)

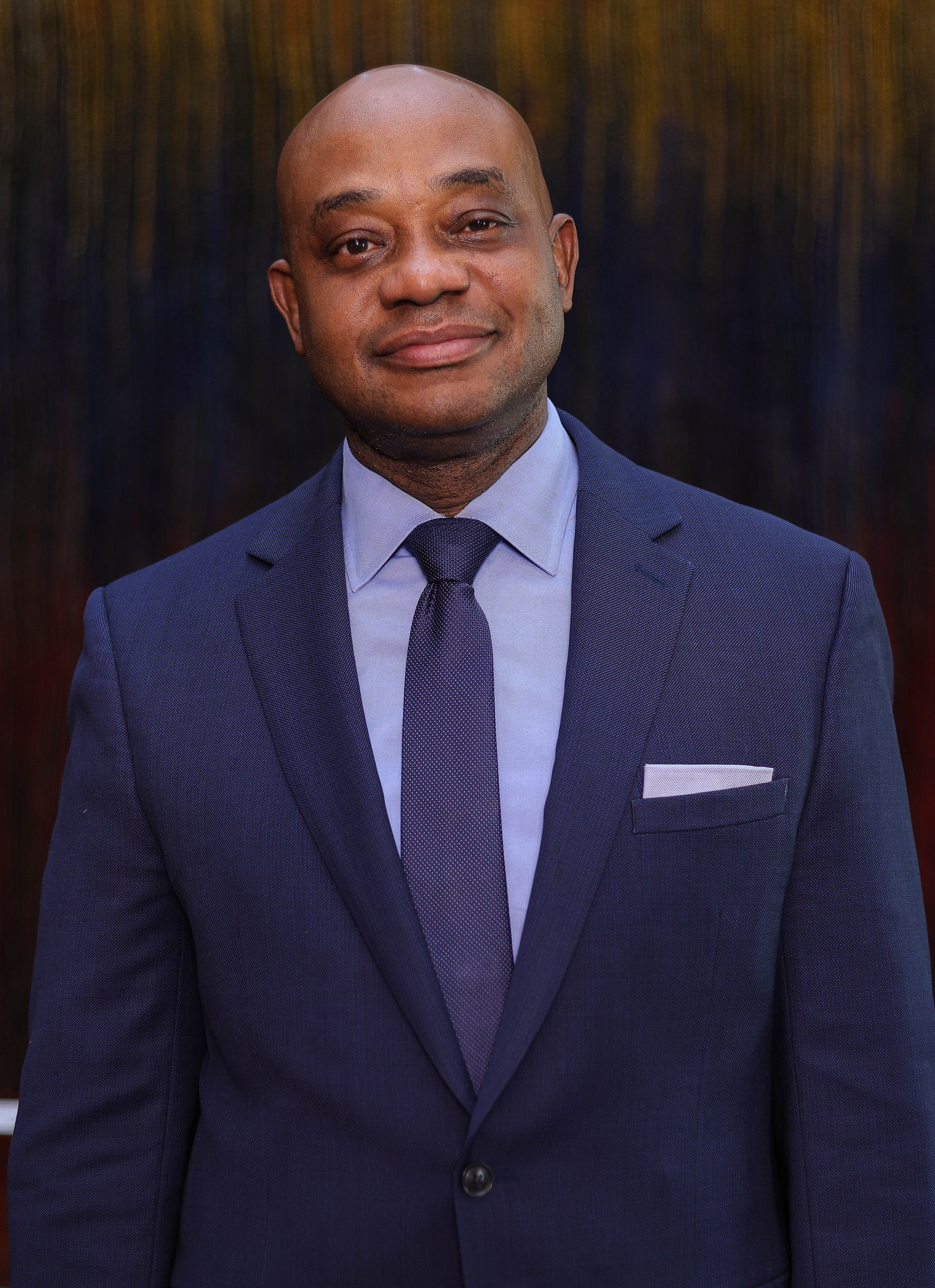
- Official portrait, 2024

Minister of Foreign Affairs
- In office 21 May 2024 – 29 January 2025 (Note: Served as Acting Minister of Foreign Affairs from 8 February 2024 to 20 April 2024.)
- President: Gustavo Petro
- Preceded by: Álvaro Leyva
- Succeeded by: Laura Sarabia

Colombian Ambassador to the United States
- In office 8 September 2022 – 21 May 2024
- President: Gustavo Petro
- Preceded by: Juan Carlos Pinzón
- Succeeded by: Daniel García-Peña

Minister of Environment and Sustainable Development
- In office 9 May 2016 – 7 August 2018
- President: Juan Manuel Santos
- Preceded by: Gabriel Vallejo López
- Succeeded by: Ricardo Lozano Picón

Governor of Chocó
- In office 1 January 2012 – 1 July 2012
- Preceded by: Patrocinio Sánchez
- Succeeded by: Óscar Gamboa Zúñiga
- In office 1 January 1998 – 1 January 1999
- Preceded by: Francisco O. Mosquera
- Succeeded by: Juan B. Hinestroza

Personal details
- Born: Luis Gilberto Murillo Urrutia; January 1, 1967 (age 59) San Juan, Chocó, Colombia
- Party: Reborn Colombia (current); Radical Change (formerly)
- Other political affiliations: Hope Center
- Spouse: Barno Khojibaeva
- Education: Russian State Geological Prospecting University (BS, MS)
- Profession: Diplomat; Mining engineer Politician

Luis Gilberto Murillo Urrutia (born 1 January 1967) is a Colombian diplomat, mining engineer, and politician who was the Minister of Environment and Sustainable Development from 2016 to 2018. He has also served as Governor of the predominantly Afro-Colombian Department of Chocó in Colombia. Murillo was kidnapped in 2000 and after his release he went into and moved to the United States and only returned to Colombia in 2011. In July 2022, Murillo was nominated by president-elect Gustavo Petro to serve as ambassador to the United States.

== Early life and education ==
Murillo’s ascent to become an influential Afro-Colombian political figure allowed him to be awarded Colombia’s ICETEX Scholarship to study abroad. As a result, he attended Russian State Geological Prospecting University where he earned his bachelor's degree in mining engineering and a master's degree in engineering science with a concentration in open-pit mining, in 1990. He also received a Certificate as Instructor of Russian Language. Six months later he returned to his native country and region to contribute to his community and to gain professional experience.

== CODECHOCO and DAMA ==
In 1993, at the age of 27, Murillo was promoted by Colombian President César Gaviria to the Office of Director General of the Corporation for Sustainable Development of the State of Chocó (CODECHOCO), under the National Department of Planning. As Director of CODECHOCO, Murillo reorganized and transformed that public institution. This transformation was needed to respond to the challenges of developing pioneering programs to promote the protection of biodiversity and the tropical rainforest. These reforms also incorporated the defense of land rights of rural Afro-Colombian and Indigenous communities that populate Choco’s River Valley Region. In this position, Murillo played an important role in the discussion of Colombia’s National Environmental Law (Law 99/93). This law mandated the creation of the Ministry of Environmental Protection. Murillo was awarded the honor as Chocó Executive of the Year in two consecutive years, 1993 and 1994.

In 1995, Bogotá’s Mayor Antanas Mockus Sivickas and the Director of the then Department of Environmental Protection of Bogotá (DAMA), Eduardo Uribe Botero, appointed Murillo as the Deputy Director of Planning of this agency. Urban environmental management had been a sector largely underdeveloped. He has taught environmental policy in Colombia’s top universities.

== Governorship ==
In 1998, a coalition of the Afro-Colombian National Movement Party, the Liberal Party, and Afro-Colombian leaders drafted Murillo as their gubernatorial candidate for the state of Chocó, five months before the election. Riding the wave of democratic optimism generated by the new 1991 Colombian Constitution and other encouraging developments in Latin America, Murillo, as an independent political figure, defeated the competitors of major traditional movements in Chocó and was elected governor – as one of the youngest people (age 31) elected to this office in Colombia’s history.

Follow his platform of reform, Governor Murillo proposed a reorganization of the institutional structure of the state government. He pioneered the creation of a Secretariat of Ethnic Affairs and the Office of Environmental Development. He also designed and implemented the state plan for ethnic development. During Murillo’s tenure, Colombian government formalized the biggest collective land title to Afro-Colombians rural communities, under the umbrella of the Asociacion Campesina del Bajo Atrato (ACIA).

However, the intimidation and massacres against Afro-Colombian communities and their subsequent displacement from their ancestral lands had already begun. All armed groups, paramilitaries and guerrillas, committed atrocities against rural communities. Given the seriousness and difficulty of the situation of Afro-Colombian and Indigenous communities of Chocó, Governor Murillo declared the state of Chocó a territory of peace. At this point, Murillo favored the creation of forces under the United Nations’ leadership and authority. At the time of this proposal, Murillo was the subject of an illegal harassment. He and his family were threatened.

In January 1999, Murillo was stripped of his office by a controversial court ruling, which has been described in editorials of Colombia’s newspaper El Espectador as unjust. The Colombian newsmagazine Revista Semana wrote that because of a legal technicality, the political career of one of the most influential leaders in Colombia was about to end. Murillo’s removal from his office had several negative ramifications for the people of Chocó. First, public confidence in the democratic process suffered. Second, state government policies that protected the environment, the rainforest and other needed reforms were abandoned. Third, issues of concern for people of Chocó lost prominence in the national political debate.

== Exile ==
After leaving the Governor’s Office, Murillo continued being an outspoken leader on issues of environment, democracy, security, and development. In 2000, Murillo was kidnapped by an illegal armed group. After being released some hours later, he left the country with his family. Murillo relocated to the United States, where he became a voice for equality, security, and development in Colombia. Murillo was determined of a greater need for political debate and organizing and he began working at the Lutheran World Relief (LWR), as the US-Colombia Policy Coordinator and was later, promoted to the position of Senior International Policy Analyst. Murillo worked to make the voices of marginalized global citizens, especially Colombians, heard in the foreign policy debate in Washington, D.C. and the international community. His work was part of LWR’s efforts to resolve conflict and to build peace around the world through local projects backed by education and advocacy in the United States.

Murillo is an advocate of Afro-Colombians and Afro-Latinos. He has created links between Afro-Colombian, Afro-Latino and African American civil society, public, and popular elected leaders. Murillo is an advocate for U.S. foreign aid that promotes equality and just development in Latin America and, hence calls for broad changes in U.S. policy toward the region. Murillo regularly participates in Congressional Briefings and lectures about critical topics of foreign policy in the United States. Articles written by or about Murillo have appeared in The Washington Post, The Baltimore Sun, Miami Herald, New Amsterdam, Chicago Tribune, and The Crisis, among others.

Murillo served at the Phelps Stokes Fund as Senior Fellow and Vice President for Programs and Strategy, Murillo led an initiative that integrates leadership, development, security, energy, environment, and culture within the framework of foreign policy. The aim of this initiative was to promote development and diversity in Latin America and throughout the world, through the promotion of youth leadership, creative social and economic inclusion, and policy and institutional transformation that are sensitive to Afro-Descendants, Indigenous, and other marginalized social groups.

Murillo also has served on the board of directors and on advisory committees of various U.S. based organizations, such as the Colombian Human Rights Committee, US Office on Colombia, American Friends Service Committee, the Global Exchange Speaking Bureau, and the Center for International Policy.

== Return to Colombia and Todos Somos Pacifico ==
After several years working in Washington, Murillo returned to Colombia in 2011 when he won for second time the election for governor of Choco, his native state. However, after a year and half in the position, he was removed once again after a controversy about an alleged disciplinary sanction against him when he first became governor, back in the nineties. After that Murillo started a tough journey to clarify his legal situation. Finally, in 2013 the office of the Colombian general Inspector, Alejandro Ordoñez Maldonado, freed Luis Murillo from any disciplinary sanction.

In 2014, Mr. Murillo worked for the re-election campaign of Colombian President Juan Manuel Santos, as campaign officer for Pacific region. After winning, President Santos appointed Mr. Murillo as Director of the Pacific Initiative, the special presidential program directed to boost the social and economic development of that region of Colombia. The program is called "Todos Somos Pacifico" and its principal office is in Bogota but with offices in Buenaventura, Quibdo, Guapi and Tumaco.

== Minister of Environment and Sustainable Development ==
In May 2016, Luis Gilberto Murillo Urrutia became the first Afro-Colombian to hold the position of Minister of Environment and Sustainable Development of Colombia. As Minister, led efforts that in two years increased the environmental rainforest and marine protected areas in Colombia from 57 million acres to 107 million acres. In addition, implemented fiscal and market-based environmental policy that led to the creation of the carbon market that went from USD $5 million to USD $20 million, and the creation of the national carbon tax, increasing the funding for community-led protection of the environment. Equally important, the implementation of a national plastic bag tax that decreased the use of plastic bags by 35% in its first year alone. During his time as Minister, Murillo led the creation of a system of payment for environmental services to rural communities, to provide incentives for the protection of the rainforest, wetlands and paramo ecosystems (high mountain moorlands). As a measure of environmental justice, this program benefits 100,000 families and over 2.4 million acres. Lastly, in addition to ensuring Colombia was on the path to meet the goals of the Paris Agreement, often referred to as the Paris Accords or the Paris Climate Accords, Murillo also chaired the Environmental Ministerial Forum of Latin America and the Caribbean that led to the agreement on a regional environmental agenda proposed at the 2017 United Nations Environment Assembly.

== 2022 presidential election ==
News outlets considered Murillo to be a likely contender for the presidential nomination of the Hope Center Coalition. However, on 21 January 2022, he opted to run for the presidency as a candidate for the Colombia Reborn party. He later expressed that he felt unwelcome within the Hope Center Coalition. Despite this, Murillo accepted an offer by Sergio Fajardo, the Hope Center Coalition's presidential nominee, to be the alliance's nominee for vice president. Murillo and Fajardo finished in fourth place. Following his unsuccessful vice presidential bid, Murillo endorsed the Historic Pact for Colombia nominee Gustavo Petro for the second round. Petro and his running mate Francia Márquez went on to win the run-off.

== Ambassador to the United States ==
In mid-July 2022, Petro announced that he would appoint Murillo as ambassador to the United States.

== Notes ==
Political offices
Preceded by Francisco O. Mosquera	Governor of Chocó; 1998–1999	Succeeded by Juan B. Hinestroza
Preceded by Patrocinio Sánchez	Governor of Chocó; 2012	Succeeded by Óscar Gamboa Zúñiga
Preceded by Gabriel Vallejo López	Minister of Environment and Sustainable Development; 2016–2018	Succeeded by Ricardo Lozano Picón
Preceded by Álvaro Leyva	Minister of Foreign Affairs; 2024-2025	Succeeded by Laura Sarabia
Party political offices
New political alliance	Hope Center nominee for Vice President of Colombia; 2022	Most recent
Diplomatic posts
Preceded by Juan Carlos Pinzón	Colombian Ambassador to the United States; 2022-2024	Succeeded by Daniel García-Peña
