= Jorge Rojas (politician) =

Colombian diplomat and politician

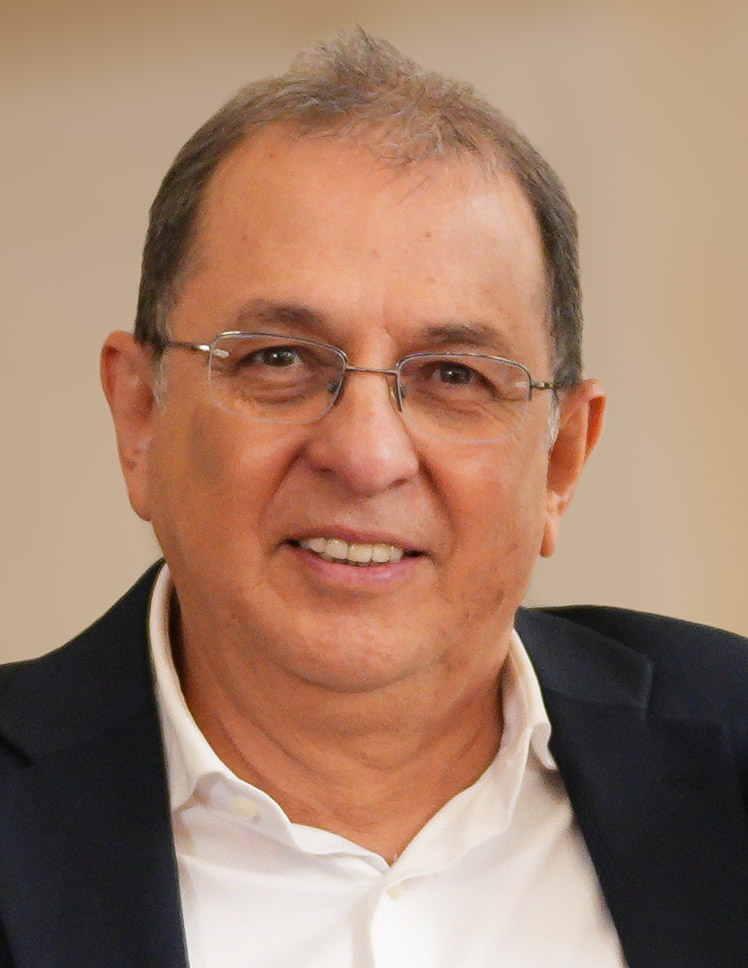
- Rojas in 2025

General Director of Administrative Department of the Presidency
- In office January 29, 2025 – February 5, 2025
- President: Gustavo Petro
- Preceded by: Laura Sarabia
- Succeeded by: Angie Rodríguez

Deputy Minister of Foreign Affairs
- In office June 6, 2024 – January 20, 2025
- President: Gustavo Petro
- Preceded by: Daniel García-Peña
- Succeeded by: Daniel Ávila

Ambassador of Colombia to Belgium and Luxembourg
- In office September 21, 2023 – July 2, 2024
- President: Gustavo Petro
- Preceded by: Hernán Cuervo
- Succeeded by: Daniel Pardo

Personal details
- Born: Jorge Enrique Rojas Rodríguez; 1957 or 1958 (age 67–68) Santa Rosa de Cabal, Risaralda, Colombia
- Party: Humane Colombia (2012-2025)
- Other political affiliations: Historic Pact for Colombia (2020-2025)
- Education: University of Córdoba
- Occupation: politician; political scientist; diplomat; professor; journalist; human rights defender

Jorge Enrique Rojas (born c. 1958) is a Colombian political scientist, diplomat, journalist, professor, and human rights defender who served as general director of the Administrative department of the presidency from January to February 2025 during the Petro administration.

Born in Santa Rosa de Cabal, Risaralda, Rojas holds the record for the shortest-serving cabinet-level agency official, serving only seven days.

Diplomatic posts
Preceded by Hernán Cuervo	Ambassador of Colombia to Belgium and Luxembourg; 2023-2024	Succeeded by Daniel Pardo
Political offices
Preceded by Daniel García-Peña	Deputy Minister of Foreign Affairs; 2024-2025	Succeeded by Daniel Ávila
Preceded by Laura Sarabia	General Director of Administrative Department of the Presidency; 2025	Succeeded by Angie Rodríguez
