= Luz Helena Sarmiento Villamizar =

Colombian politician and geologist

3rd Minister of Environment and Sustainable Development of Colombia
- In office 11 September 2013 – 11 August 2014
- President: Juan Manuel Santos Calderón
- Preceded by: Juan Gabriel Uribe Vegalara
- Succeeded by: Gabriel Vallejo

Personal details
- Born: Girón, Santander, Colombia
- Education: Industrial University of Santander
- Profession: Geologist

Luz Helena Sarmiento Villamizar is a Colombian geologist, and a former Minister of Environment and Sustainable Development of Colombia, serving in the administration of President Juan Manuel Santos Calderón. The former Director of the National Authority of Environmental Licenses (ANLA); a Colombian government agency in charge of licensing mining, energy, and infrastructure projects; she graduated from the Industrial University of Santander, and previously worked in the energy sector.

== Minister of Environment ==
On 5 September 2013, as part of a planned cabinet reshuffle, President Santos announced the appointment of Sarmiento as the new Minister of Environment and Sustainable Development. Sarmiento was sworn in on 11 September succeeding Juan Gabriel Uribe Vegalara in the post. She was succeeded by Gabriel Vallejo as Minister of Environment in August 2014.
