= Ricardo Lozano Picón =

Colombian geologist and politician

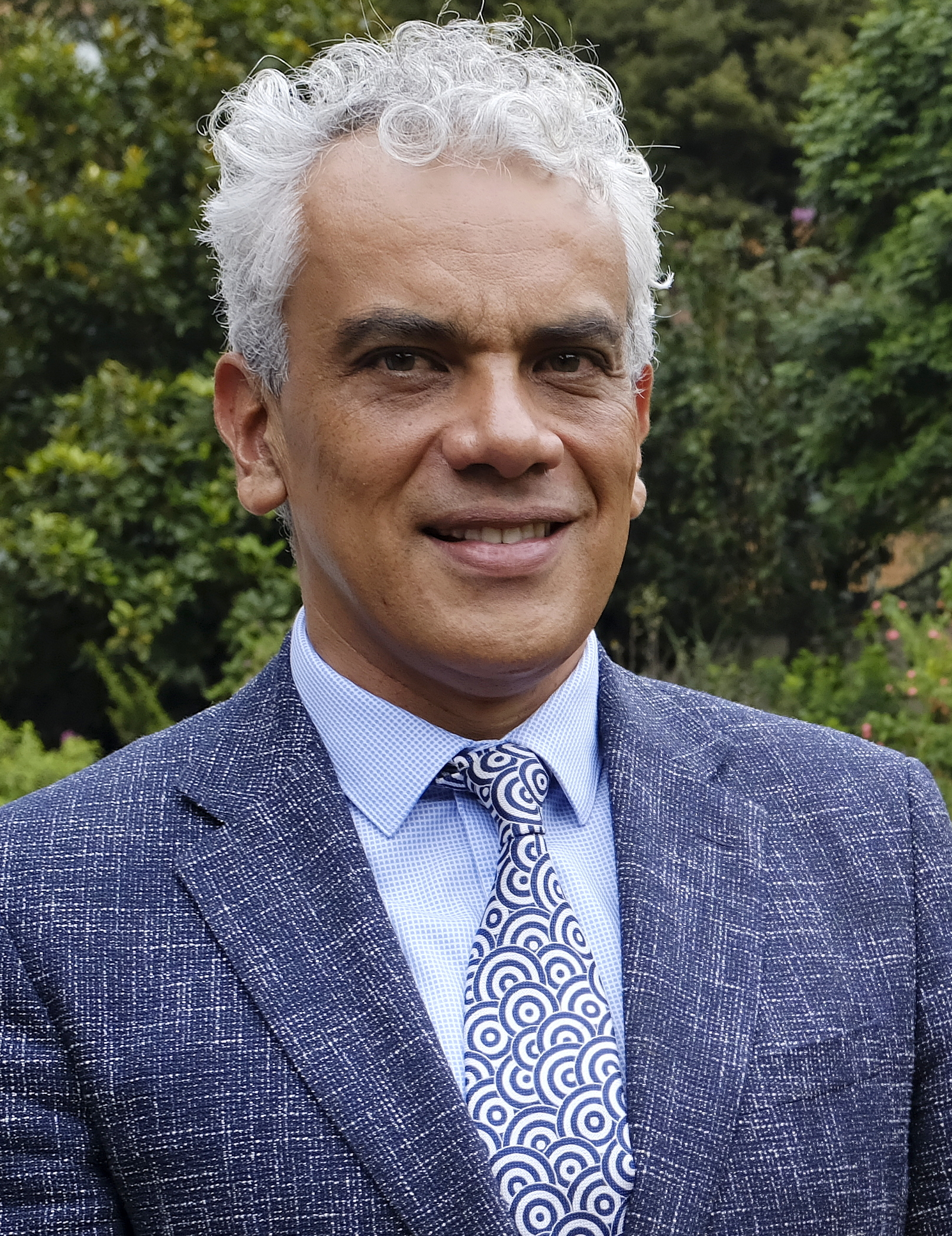

Minister of Environment and Sustainable Development
- In office 7 August 2018 – 4 October 2020
- President: Iván Duque Márquez
- Preceded by: Luis Gilberto Murillo
- Succeeded by: Carlos Eduardo Correa

Director of the Institute of Hydrology, Meteorology and Environmental Studies
- In office 1 May 2008 – 1 February 2013

Personal details
- Born: Ricardo José Lozano Picón; 17 December 1968 (age 57) Bucaramanga, Santander, Colombia
- Education: Industrial University of Santander

Ricardo José Lozano Picón (born 17 December 1968) is a Colombian geologist and politician who was the Minister of Environment and Sustainable Development from 2018 to 2020. He has also served as Director of the Institute of Hydrology, Meteorology and Environmental Studies from 2008 to 2013.

== Biography ==
Lozano served as director of the Institute of Hydrology, Meteorology and Environmental Studies (IDEAM) from May 2008 to February 2013. He also served as alternate vice president of the Inter-American Institute for Climate Change Research, headquarters in Brazil and Washington.

In August 2018, Lozano was appointed by Iván Duque Márquez as Minister of Environment and Sustainable Development.

== Personal life ==
Lozano identifies himself as gay.
