= Guillermo Botero =

Colombian lawyer (born 1948)

Guillermo Botero Nieto
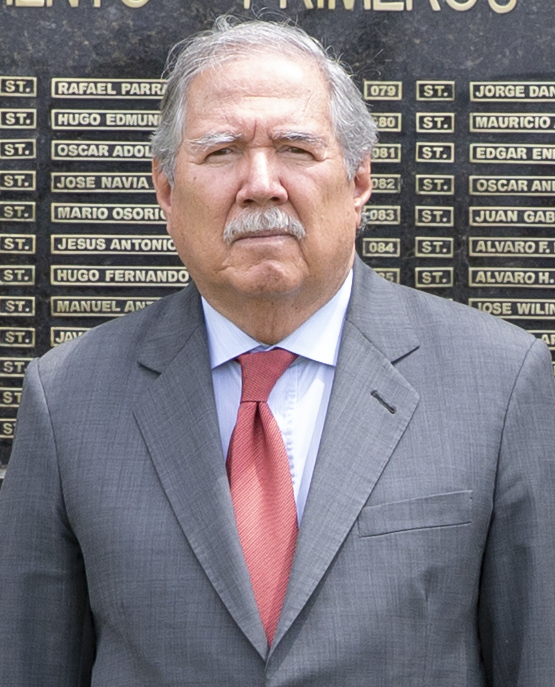

Ambassador of Colombia in Chile
- In office 23 February 2021 – 6 August 2022
- Preceded by: Alberto Rendón Cuartas
- Succeeded by: Sebastián Guanumen

Minister of National Defense
- In office 7 August 2018 – 6 November 2019
- President: Iván Duque
- Preceded by: Luis Carlos Villegas
- Succeeded by: Carlos Holmes Trujillo

Personal details
- Born: 9 April 1948 (age 78) Bogotá, Colombia
- Education: University of Los Andes
- Profession: Lawyer

Lorenzo Guillermo Botero Nieto (born 9 April 1948) is a Colombian lawyer, businessman, lecturer, and politician. He was appointed as Minister of Defense between 2018 and November 2019.

== Biography ==
=== Beginnings ===
Botero was born in Bogotá in 1948, the day of the events of El Bogotazo. He is the son of the Antioquian merchant Lorenzo Botero Jaramillo, who was the founder of FENALCO, a guild that brings together all the merchants of Colombia, one of the most important sectors in the country.

He studied law at the University of Los Andes, where he was also a professor, and is a businessman with extensive experience working in the Colombian territory. He has combined the practice of law with business activities in the areas of foreign trade, logistics operations, while always being linked to trade union activities.

== Career in the private sector ==
In his business activity, the export of cut flowers stands out since 1979, as well as the presidency for 10 years until 2003, of a company dedicated to the storage, handling and custody of merchandise associated with logistics processes.

Since November 2003, he has held the presidency of FENALCO (National Federation of Merchants), an entity to which he has been linked as a member of its board of directors on different occasions since 1985. He has been a speaker at different forums on political and economic issues.

Between 2016 and 2017, he was president of the board of directors of the Bogotá Chamber of Commerce and between 2020 and 2021 he was a main member of the board of directors of Corferias.

== Career in the public sector ==
=== Ministry of Defence ===
In 2018, Botero was appointed by President Duque as the new minister of national defense.

In 2019, the Secretary of Defense of the United States, Jim Mattis, met with Botero in Bogotá to discuss national defense issues, taking into account the long relationship between both governments in handling such matters. Mattis thanked Botero and the Colombian government for all their efforts to enforce security in Colombia and for denouncing anti-democratic actions, especially by governments in countries like Venezuela and Nicaragua.

Within the framework of his duties, Botero has controversially confronted the rearmament of former FARC leaders; the proposal to regulate social protest as a result of the constant marches against the government; the scandal of the false evidence presented by President Duque before the General Assembly of the United Nations denouncing the guerrilla incursion into Venezuela and the support of the president of that country, Nicolás Maduro for these groups in September 2019, as well as the denunciations of the so-called false positives scandal.

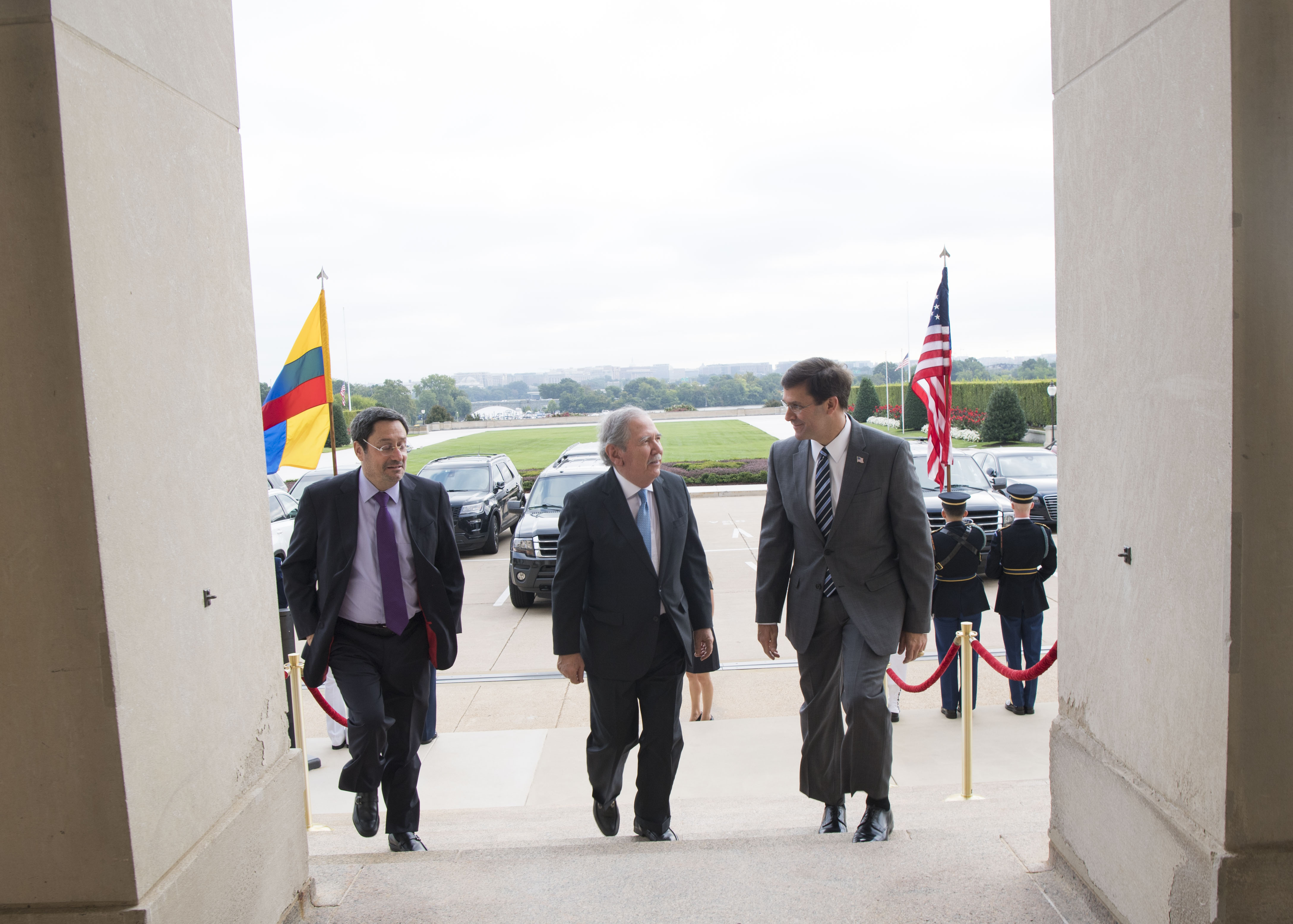
Guillermo Botero meets with US Secretary of Defense Mark Esper at the Pentagon, Washington D.C., on September 11, 2019.

=== Motions of censure and resignation ===
During his mandate, he faced two attempts at motion of censureː The first in June 2019, which he overcame successfully due to the support of the government caucus, and another in November 2019.

Before the second motion was voted on, Botero announced his resignation on 6 November 2019, one day before it began, after immense citizen pressure caused by various events presented in his mandate, such as the murder of Dimar Torres (which raised suspicions of the return of extrajudicial executions, popularly known as "false positives"). Likewise, for the bombing of a place occupied by FARC dissidents in the municipality of Puerto Rico, Caquetá, where 18 minors died.

=== Embassy of Colombia in Chile ===
After resigning from his position as defense minister, on February 23, 2021, Botero was appointed by President Iván Duque as Ambassador of Colombia to the Republic of Chile. He replaced Alberto Rendón Cuartas, who had been holding the position since 2018. As part of the diplomatic agenda, which includes dealing with issues of economic and cultural cooperation between nations, during Botero's mandate in 2022, 200 years of diplomatic relations between these two countries were celebrated.

== See also ==
- Ministry of National Defense of Colombia
- Colombian conflict
