= Ministry of Environment and Sustainable Development (Colombia) =

Government ministry of Colombia

- Ministerio de Ambiente y Desarrollo Sostenible

Ministry overview
- Formed: 4 May 2011
- Preceding Ministry: Ministry of Environment, Housing and Territorial Development
- Headquarters: Calle 37 № 8-40 Bogotá, D.C., Colombia; 04°37′31.31″N 74°04′00.97″W
- Annual budget: COL$274,026,392,000 (2013); COP$318,331,457,988 (2014)
- Ministry executive: Fabio Arjona, Minister of Environment and Sustainable Development
- Website: www.minambiente.gov.co

The Ministry of Environment and Sustainable Development (Spanish: Ministerio de Ambiente y Desarrollo Sostenible) is the national executive ministry of the Government of Colombia in charge of formulating, implementing, and orienting environmental policy to ensure the sustainable development of the country.

== List of Ministers ==
Name	Assumed office	Left office	President(s) served under	Ref.
Manuel Rodríguez Becerra	November 6, 1993	January 8, 1996	César Gaviria	
Cecilia López	January 8, 1996	April 4, 1997	Ernesto Samper	
Eduardo Verano de la Rosa	April 4, 1997	August 7, 1998	Ernesto Samper	
Juan Mayr	August 7, 1998	August 7, 2002	Andrés Pastrana	
Cecilia Rodríguez	August 7, 2002	October 28, 2003	Álvaro Uribe	
Sandra Suárez	October 28, 2003	August 7, 2007	Álvaro Uribe	
Juan Lozano Ramírez	August 7, 2007	May 23, 2008	Álvaro Uribe	
Carlos Costa	May 23, 2008	August 7, 2010	Álvaro Uribe	
Beatriz Uribe	August 7, 2010	September 27, 2011	Juan Manuel Santos	
Frank Pearl	September 27, 2011	September 21, 2012	Juan Manuel Santos	
Juan Gabriel Uribe	September 21, 2012	September 11, 2013	Juan Manuel Santos	
Luz Helena Sarmiento	September 11, 2013	August 11, 2014	Juan Manuel Santos	
Gabriel Vallejo	August 11, 2014	April 26, 2016	Juan Manuel Santos	
Luis Gilberto Murillo	April 26, 2016	August 7, 2018	Juan Manuel Santos	
Ricardo Lozano	August 7, 2018	October 4, 2020	Iván Duque	
Carlos Eduardo Correa	October 4, 2020	August 7, 2022	Iván Duque	
Susana Muhamad	August 7, 2022	February 9, 2025	Gustavo Petro	
Lena Estrada	March 3, 2025	August 7, 2026	Gustavo Petro	
Fabio Arjona	August 7, 2026		Abelardo de la Espriella	
