= Fabio Arjona =

Minister of Environment and Sustainable Development
- Incumbent
- Assumed office 7 August 2026
- President: Abelardo de la Espriella
- Preceded by: Irene Vélez Torres

Director of Conservation International Colombia
- In office 2001–2026

Deputy Minister of Environment and Sustainable Development
- In office c. March 1997 – c. June 1998
- President: Ernesto Samper
- Preceded by: Ernesto Guhl
- Succeeded by: Claudia Martínez Zuleta

Personal details
- Born: Fabio Alberto Arjona Hincapié; 1956 (age 69–70) Montería, Córdoba, Colombia
- Party: Independent
- Education: Jorge Tadeo Lozano University
- Occupation: Marine biologist • Environmentalist

Fabio Alberto Arjona Hincapié (born c. 1956) is a Colombian marine biologist, environmentalist and politician currently serving as Minister of Environment and Sustainable Development after being nominated and accepted office by Abelardo de la Espriella, President of Colombia.
