= Conservation International Colombia =

Country programme of Conservation International in Colombia

- Abbreviation: CI Colombia
- Formation: 1991
- Type: Country programme
- Headquarters: Bogotá, Colombia
- Region served: Colombia
- Fields: Biodiversity conservation; protected areas; watersheds; sustainable landscapes; conservation finance; marine and coastal conservation
- Director: Fabio Arjona Hincapié
- Parent organization: Conservation International
- Website: www.conservation.org.co

Conservation International Colombia (CI Colombia) is the country programme of Conservation International in Colombia. The programme is based in Bogotá and has operated in Colombia since 1991.

Programme work in Colombia includes watershed conservation and restoration in the Bogotá Region, sustainable-landscape initiatives in the Colombian Amazon and the Andes-Amazon transition (including Naturamazonas and Pacto HYLEA), conservation finance mechanisms supporting protected areas, and marine and coastal conservation activities on Colombia's Pacific coast. The programme has also participated in climate change adaptation initiatives, including implementation arrangements for the Integrated National Adaptation Project (INAP).

== Overview ==
CI Colombia has supported watershed-focused conservation and restoration planning in the Bogotá Region, including work on a corridor-scale landscape linking the Chingaza and Sumapaz areas developed with Bogotá's water utility and partners and framed around biodiversity and water-related ecosystem services.

In the Colombian Amazon and adjacent Andes-Amazon transition region, programme activities have included a community-engagement platform at the Centro Ambiental La Pedrera in Amazonas, participation in Naturamazonas initiatives in the Andean-Amazon foothills, an ecological restoration project with Siona communities in Puerto Asís (Putumayo), and participation in the Pacto HYLEA Andean-Amazon corridor initiative in Huila.

Conservation finance work associated with the programme has included participation in Colombia's 2004 debt-for-nature swap under the U.S. Tropical Forest Conservation Act and involvement in Herencia Colombia, a project-finance-for-permanence initiative intended to support long-term financing for Colombia's protected areas system and expansion of terrestrial and marine protected areas.

Marine and coastal activities have included engagement in policy discussions related to shark conservation and fisheries management measures affecting coastal communities.

On Colombia's Pacific coast, the programme has supported community-led retrieval of abandoned fishing gear (ghost gear) from nearshore ecosystems, including in the Gulf of Tribugá.

== History ==
Conservation International began activities in Colombia on 19 December 1991.

In September 1998, Conservation International established the Centro Ambiental La Pedrera in La Pedrera as a platform for community engagement and related activities in the Colombian Amazon.

In 2004, Colombia completed a debt-for-nature swap under the Tropical Forest Conservation Act intended to support conservation projects protecting tropical forests.

Between 2006 and 2011, CI Colombia served as the implementing agency for the Integrated National Adaptation Project (INAP), a Global Environment Facility-financed programme intended to support pilot adaptation measures and policy options in vulnerable areas of Colombia.

By 2016, Herencia Colombia was referenced among efforts to strengthen long-term financing for Colombia's protected areas system.

In September 2020, a memorandum of understanding was signed as a framework for implementing the initiative.

In 2022, partners launched Herencia Colombia as a project-finance-for-permanence initiative for long-term protected-area financing and expansion of terrestrial and marine protected areas.

== Programmes and operations ==
Selected programme locations in Colombia (1 Bogotá, 2 Chingaza-Sumapaz corridor (Bogotá Region), 3 Huila (Andes-Amazon transition), 4 La Pedrera (Amazonas), 5 Puerto Asís (Putumayo), 6 Gulf of Tribugá (Pacific coast))

=== Bogotá and Bogotá Region ===
In the Bogotá Region, CI Colombia has supported watershed-focused conservation and restoration planning with Bogotá's water utility and partners, including work on the Chingaza-Sumapaz-Guerrero conservation corridor and related action guidelines framed around biodiversity and water-related ecosystem services. The INAP final report described corridor planning around Chingaza, Sumapaz and Guerrero as covering about 600,000 hectares and producing guidelines for conservation, restoration and protected-area management at a regional scale.

In the Upper Bogotá River basin and associated water-supply catchments, natural infrastructure approaches have framed upstream ecosystem protection, restoration and land management as part of Bogotá's water system, including analysis of potential water-quality and economic benefits from upstream investments. Bogotá's water-supply headwaters include high-mountain Andean ecosystems such as páramo that regulate runoff and help sustain water yield, and land-use change can affect hydrological functioning in these headwaters.

Within the corridor landscape, CI Colombia has participated in a climate-adaptation project launched in 2025 focused on high-mountain ecosystems and water sources supplying the Bogotá Region, with initial work including ecological restoration and climate and biodiversity monitoring. Technical notes produced as part of an adaptation project and developed jointly with CI Colombia provided recommendations for including climate-change management and climate variability in municipal land-use planning, including fichas for Guasca (Cundinamarca) and San Juanito (Meta). Ecosystem-based adaptation approaches in the Chingaza Massif have been linked to water regulation and climate vulnerability for Bogotá, including conservation and restoration actions intended to maintain ecosystem services associated with water supply and regulation.

In Bogotá, CI Colombia has participated with Bogotá's district environment secretariat and the Usaquén local development fund in implementing a social participation strategy intended to involve social and institutional actors in creek-recovery actions in the locality of Usaquén.

=== Huila (Andes-Amazon transition) ===
In Huila, CI Colombia has participated in the Pacto HYLEA Corredor Andino Amazónico initiative, described as a multi-actor alliance linked to forest restoration, wildlife monitoring and sustainable production in a landscape-connectivity corridor.

=== Colombian Amazon ===
In Amazonas, CI Colombia has operated the Centro Ambiental La Pedrera in La Pedrera as a platform for community engagement and related activities in the Colombian Amazon. The centre was established in 1998.

=== Putumayo ===
In Putumayo, CI Colombia has worked with Siona communities in the municipality of Puerto Asís on an ecological restoration project referred to as Si'aira.

Naturamazonas has been described as an initiative in the Andean-Amazon foothills with activities in departments including Putumayo, Caquetá, Cauca, Meta and Guaviare and structured around components such as knowledge generation, sustainable production and institutional coordination. In Putumayo, a Colombia Sostenible project implemented under Naturamazonas has been administered by Conservation International and has supported ecosystem-restoration actions and sustainable-production activities with rural producer associations in PDET municipalities including Mocoa, Villagarzón and Puerto Guzmán.

=== Caribbean and Pacific coasts ===
On Colombia's Caribbean and Pacific coasts, CI Colombia has participated in national discussions related to shark conservation and fisheries measures affecting coastal communities.

On Colombia's Pacific coast, CI Colombia has supported community-led retrieval of abandoned fishing gear (ghost gear) from nearshore ecosystems and related diver training and reef-monitoring activities, including in the Gulf of Tribugá.

Selected programme landscapes and locations of Conservation International Colombia
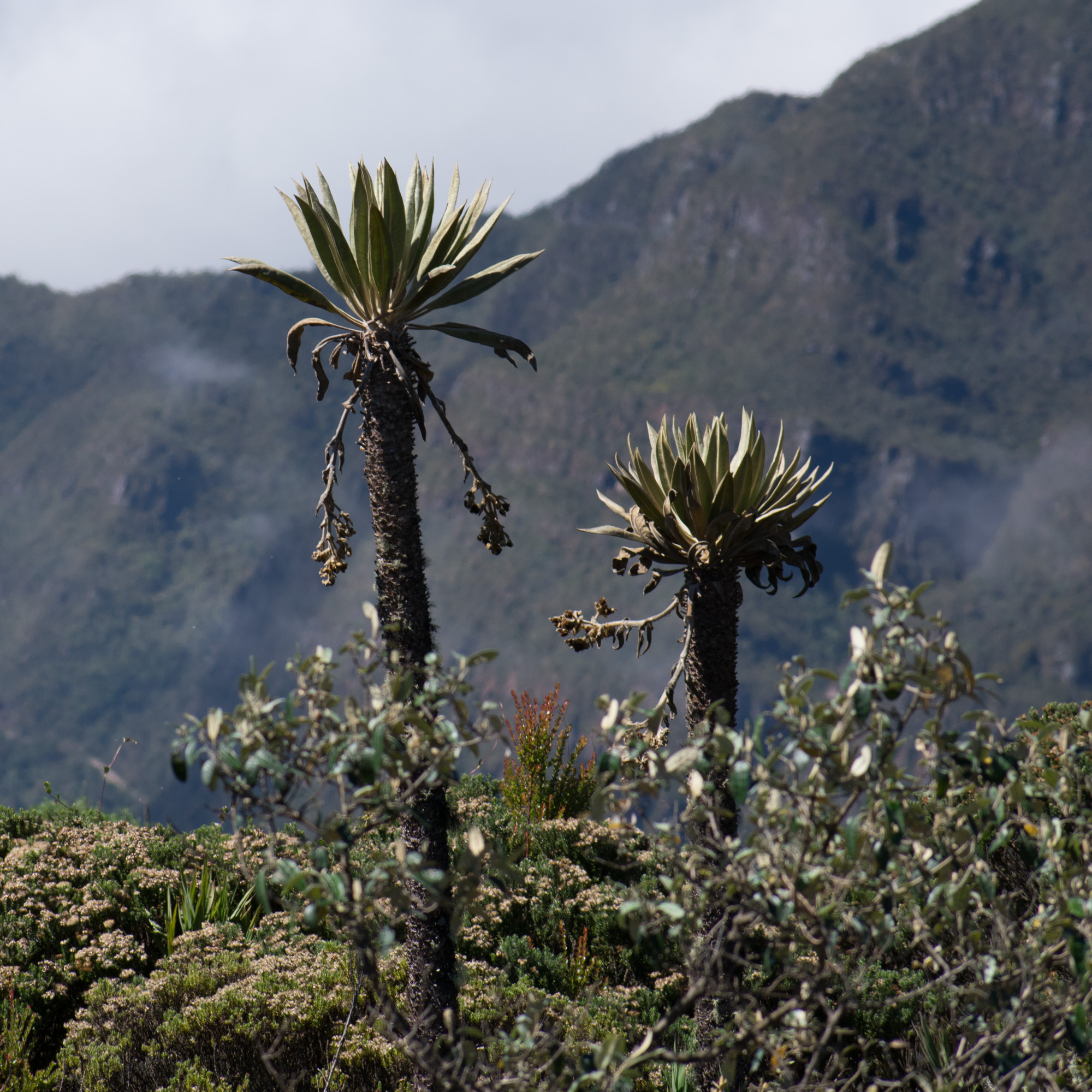
Frailejones in Chingaza National Natural Park, part of the high-mountain ecosystems supplying the Bogotá Region

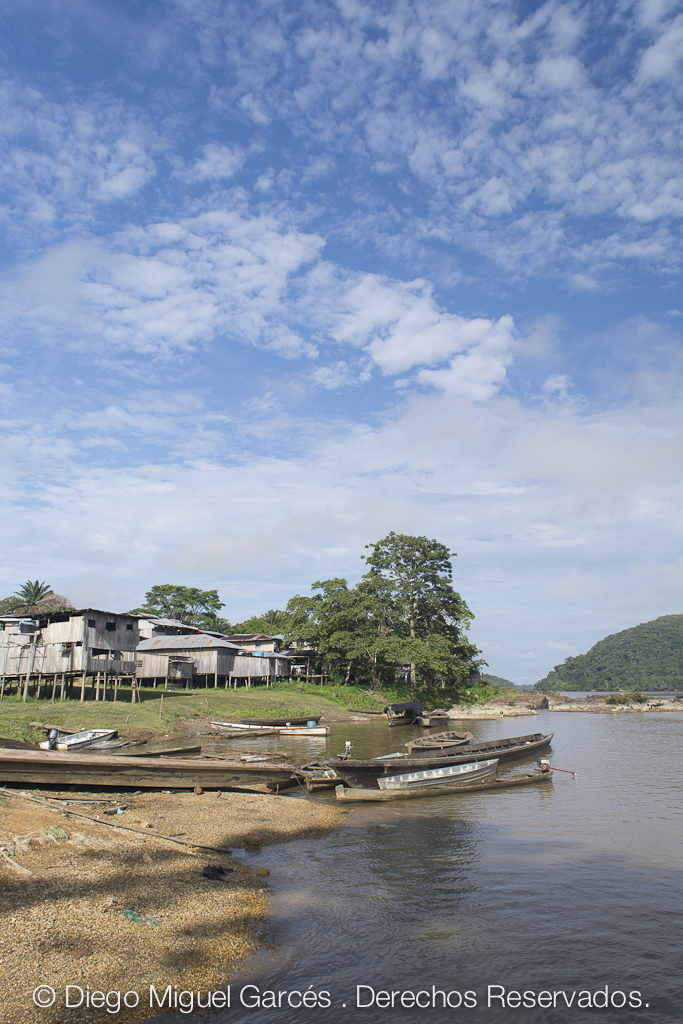
La Pedrera, a fluvial settlement on the Caquetá River in the Colombian Amazon

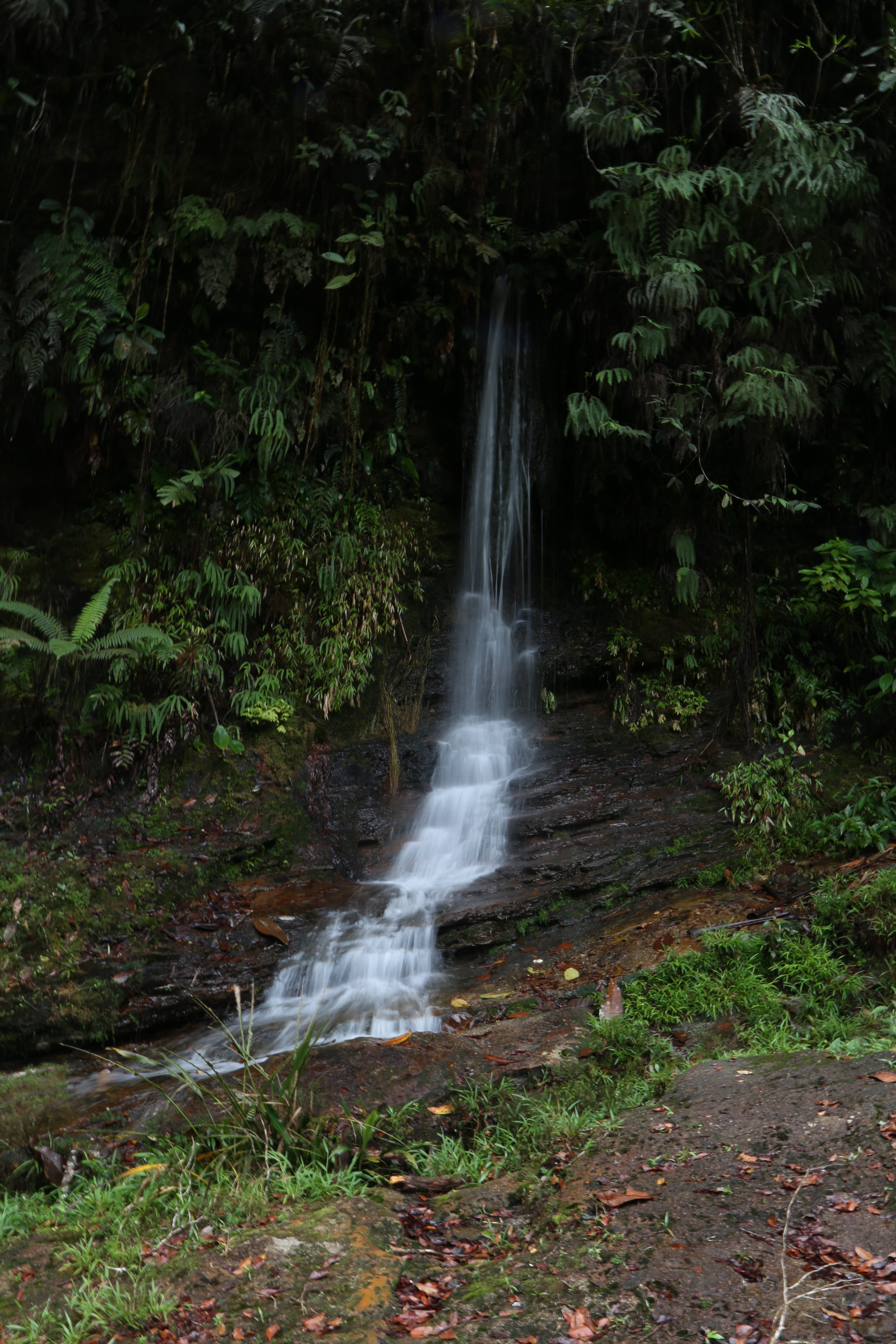
Cascadas del Fin del Mundo near Mocoa, Putumayo

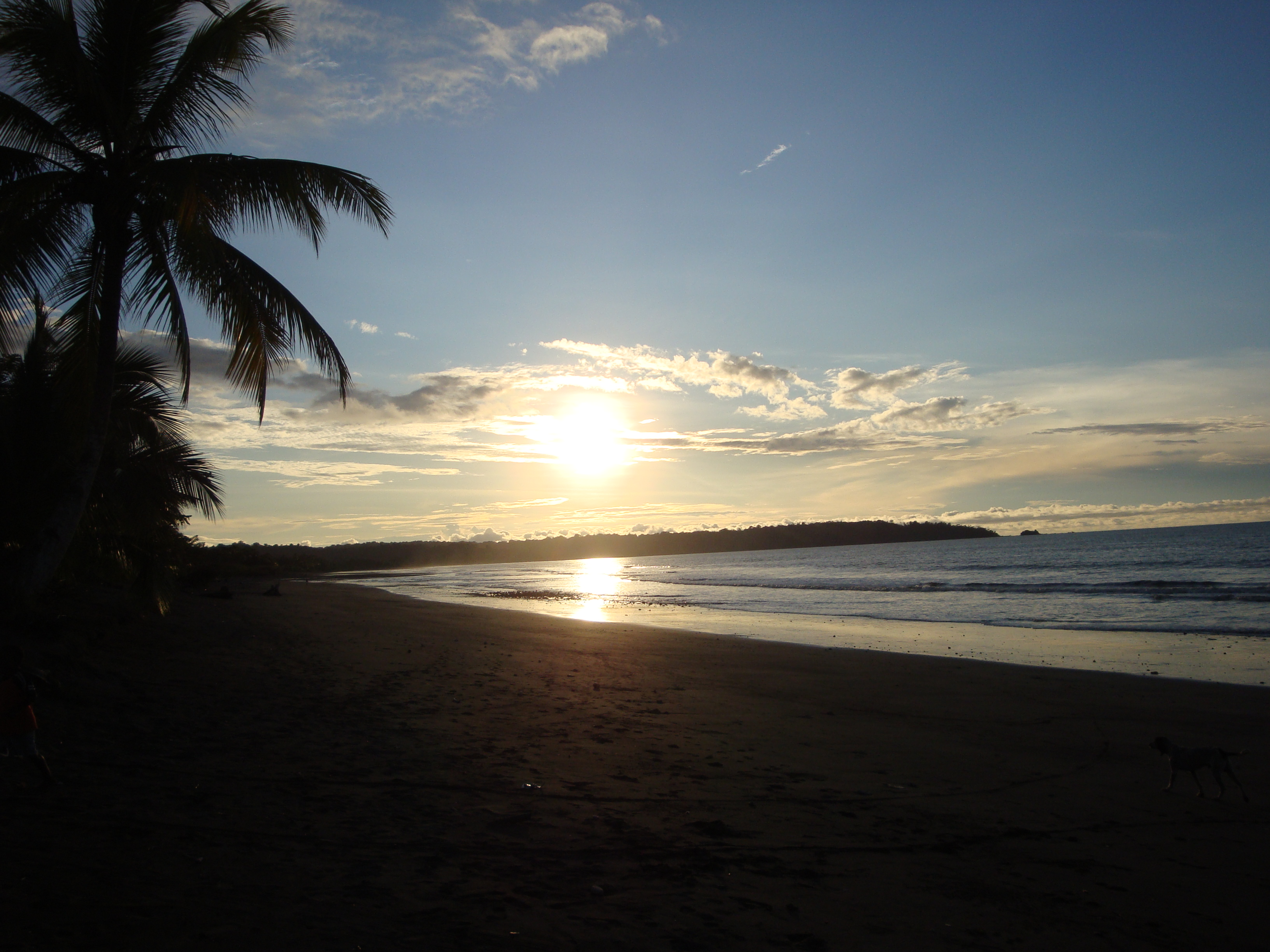
Sunset over the Gulf of Tribugá on Colombia's Pacific coast

== Partnerships ==
Work in the Bogotá Region has involved collaboration with Bogotá's water utility, Empresa de Acueducto y Alcantarillado de Bogotá (EAAB), on corridor-scale watershed planning in the Chingaza–Sumapaz–Guerrero landscape, and joint work on natural-infrastructure analysis for Bogotá's water system. Partnerships with regional and district institutions have included cooperation with RAP-E Región Central on páramo and water-security initiatives, participation in a multi-institution adaptation project in the Chingaza–Sumapaz–Guerrero–Guacheneque landscape, and participation with Bogotá's environment authorities in creek-recovery actions in the locality of Usaquén.

CI Colombia has participated in multi-actor initiatives in the Andean-Amazon foothills and the Andes–Amazon transition, including Naturamazonas projects implemented under the Colombia Sostenible programme and the Pacto HYLEA alliance in Huila. On the Pacific coast, community-led retrieval of abandoned fishing gear in the Gulf of Tribugá has been supported with local organisations including Ecomares and the Guardianes del Mar diving group.

Herencia Colombia (HeCo) has been developed as a project-finance-for-permanence initiative through agreements involving national environmental authorities and partner organisations including Fondo Patrimonio Natural, the Gordon and Betty Moore Foundation, the World Wildlife Fund, the Wildlife Conservation Society and Conservation International Foundation.

In 2004, a debt-for-nature swap under the U.S. Tropical Forest Conservation Act was completed between the governments of Colombia and the United States, with Conservation International, The Nature Conservancy, and the World Wildlife Fund participating as signatories.

== Funding and conservation finance ==
CI Colombia's work has been linked to conservation-finance mechanisms used in Colombia to support protected areas and forest conservation, including debt-for-nature transactions and project-finance-for-permanence initiatives.

Project finance for permanence (PFP) is a conservation-finance approach intended to support the long-term management and sustainable financing of large-scale conservation programmes, including country-wide or regional systems of protected and conserved areas, by securing policy changes and the funding needed to meet defined conservation goals over a long-term timeframe. In simple terms, it combines a multi-year conservation plan and financial model with an upfront "single closing" in which major funding commitments are secured, and funds are then disbursed subject to agreed disbursement conditions (milestones and results).

=== Tropical Forest Conservation Act debt swap ===
In April 2004, agreements were signed that reduced Colombia's debt to the United States by over US$10 million in exchange for commitments to fund local conservation projects and to establish a permanent endowment for long-term support in specified tropical-forest regions, with the agreement implemented through a committee including representatives of Colombia, the United States, and participating conservation organisations.

The U.S. Tropical Forest Conservation Act (TFCA) was enacted in 1998 to allow eligible countries to reduce certain U.S. debts while generating funding for tropical forest conservation; debt-for-nature swaps can direct repayments or proceeds into conservation programmes within the debtor country and can involve repayment in local currency rather than hard currency.

For the 2004 TFCA agreement with Colombia, published estimates included a U.S. budget cost of US$7 million and private funds leveraged of US$1.4 million, and an estimated US$10 million in conservation funds generated over a 12-year duration for the transaction.

=== Herencia Colombia ===
Herencia Colombia (HeCo) has been described as a project-finance-for-permanence initiative intended to support long-term financing and management of Colombia's protected areas system while supporting expansion of terrestrial and marine protected areas, and has been described as an alliance of public and private actors including Conservation International among its coalition members.

In 2022, partners announced an agreement described as securing about US$245 million in public and private finance intended to support long-term management of Colombia's protected areas system and to expand terrestrial and marine protected areas.

A memorandum of understanding signed in September 2020 set out an implementation framework for HeCo among Colombia's environment authorities and partner organisations including Fondo Patrimonio Natural, the Gordon and Betty Moore Foundation, the World Wildlife Fund, the Wildlife Conservation Society and Conservation International Foundation.

=== Debt-conversion standards ===
During the 2024 UN biodiversity conference (COP16) in Cali, Conservation International was among organisations launching a coalition intended to develop practice standards for sovereign debt conversions aimed at supporting climate and nature commitments, with standards expected to address issues including governance, operations and conservation trust funds.

=== Assessments and debate ===
Debt-for-nature swaps have been discussed in the conservation-finance literature as a mechanism that converts or restructures debt to generate local funding for conservation activities, with analyses noting both potential long-term funding benefits and implementation challenges that depend on programme viability and institutional capacity.

A 2025 review described a renewed policy focus on debt-for-nature swaps while arguing that the evidence base should move from exploratory discussion toward more empirical research, and the CRS report also summarised policy debates over the scale of debt reduction, how conservation funds are generated and disbursed, and the contested relationship between debt reduction and reduced resource extraction.

== Impact and evaluation ==
=== Integrated National Adaptation Project ===
In completion reporting for the Integrated National Adaptation Project (INAP), CI Colombia was described as responsible for administrative and financial management processes, including procurement and disbursements, within a multi-institution arrangement delivering technical components through national and regional agencies. In simple terms, this role focuses on contracting and financial reporting so that technical agencies can concentrate on implementing field activities and technical work.

An INAP final report described the project's overall financing envelope as about US$14.9 million from domestic and international sources, and reported that by 30 June 2011 about 99% of the US$5.4 million grant had been committed and about 98% disbursed based on disbursement requests submitted through CI. The same report described corridor work in the Chingaza–Sumapaz–Guerrero landscape that identified priority areas and produced conservation and restoration guidelines, and it reported consolidation actions in and around Chingaza National Natural Park including acquisition of properties totaling about 2,800 hectares.

The Implementation Completion and Results Report rated the project outcome satisfactory and assessed both borrower and bank performance as satisfactory, with moderate risk to development outcomes. It also noted that many indicators were framed as outputs, reflecting that adaptation outcomes may take longer to observe, and concluded that the project largely met its key performance indicators; it described procurement performance as satisfactory following corrective actions and independent reviews.

A subsequent completion review rated the outcome moderately satisfactory and raised questions about efficiency, including concerns about resources allocated to long-term climate and disease forecasting models that were assessed as less directly connected to the project objectives. The same review highlighted reported outputs including guidelines to incorporate climate variability and climate change into regional development plans in the Chingaza Massif, and described CI Colombia as effective in providing administrative and technical support and coordination across participating agencies.

A qualitative study of ecosystem-based adaptation projects in Colombia analysed an INAP component in the Chingaza area and reported that interviewees identified a mix of perceived social benefits and costs associated with project activities, with perceived benefits including knowledge and capacity-building and perceived costs including unmet expectations and opportunity costs related to land use.

=== Bogotá water system natural infrastructure analysis ===
An assessment of natural infrastructure options for Bogotá's water system modelled potential economic and water-quality benefits from upstream investments, including scenarios involving restoration and sustainable land management in the Upper Bogotá River basin and associated water-supply catchments. The analysis estimated that implementing sustainable silvopastoral systems and restoration across 2,460 hectares could require about US$5.3 million and generate about US$44.6 million in undiscounted benefits over a 30-year period.

=== Reported outputs from landscape and coastal initiatives ===
In Huila, a 2025 progress update for Pacto HYLEA reported more than 700 hectares of forest restoration and wildlife monitoring that recorded 1,282 species, alongside activities described as directly benefiting about 2,100 rural families. In Putumayo, a Colombia Sostenible project implemented under Naturamazonas reported restoration interventions covering 310.78 hectares and 614 zero-deforestation agreements covering more than 1,500 hectares, alongside sustainable-production activities with rural producer associations.

On the Pacific coast, a community diving group working in the Gulf of Tribugá described retrieving ghost fishing nets from nearshore ecosystems, with divers estimating that more than 120 kg of nets had been removed since 2023 in actions supported by Conservation International and partners.
