= Angie Rodríguez =

Colombian politician

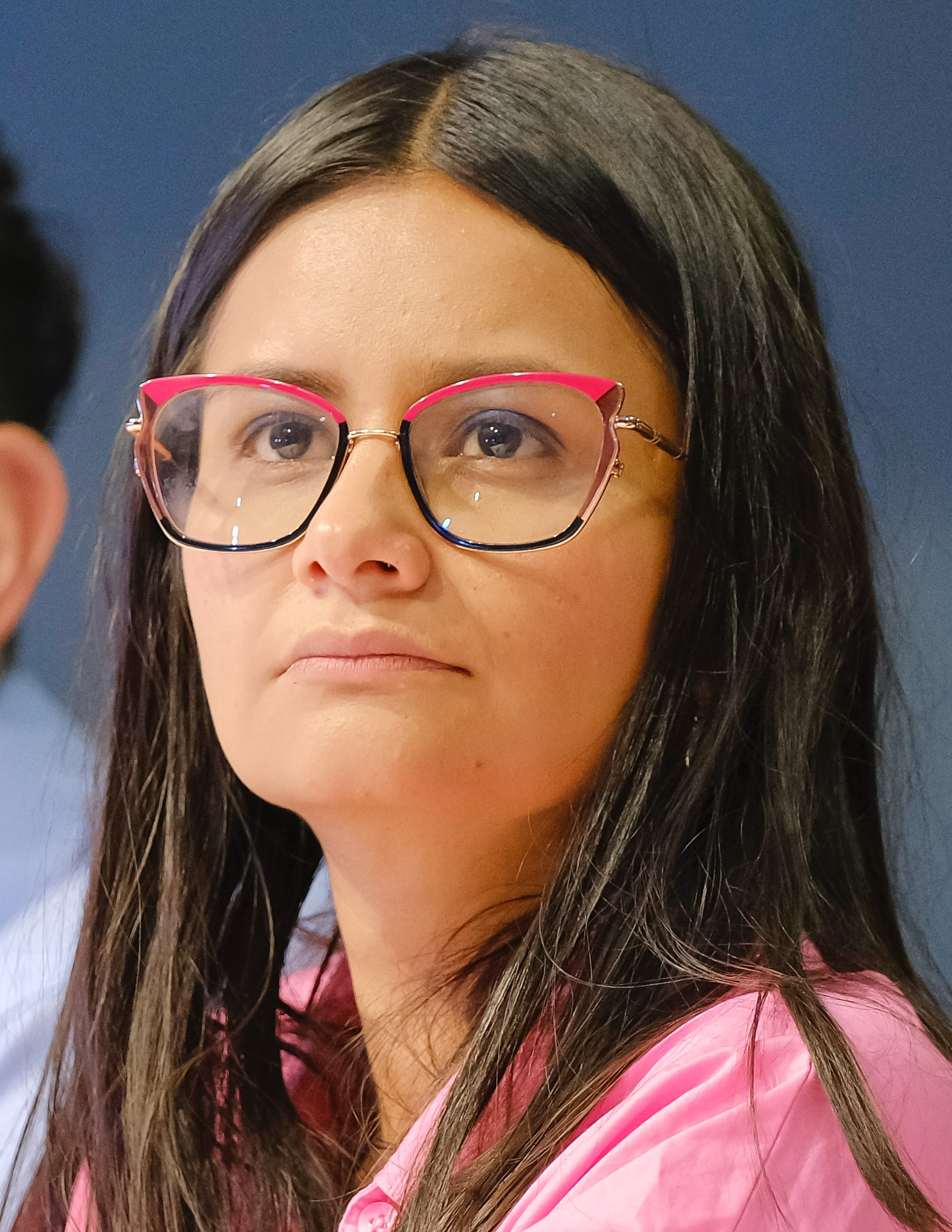
- Rodríguez in 2025.

Manager of The Adaptation Fund
- Incumbent
- Assumed office November 4, 2025
- President: Gustavo Petro
- Preceded by: Carlos Carillo

Secretary General of the Presidency
- In office May 23, 2025 – January 13, 2026
- President: Gustavo Petro
- Preceded by: Jorge Rojas
- Succeeded by: Nhora Mondragón

Personal details
- Born: Angie Lizeth Rodríguez Fajardo Bogotá, D.C., Colombia
- Party: Humane Colombia (2012-present)
- Other political affiliations: Historic Pact for Colombia (2020-present)
- Education: Superior School of Public Administration
- Occupation: Public administrator; politician

Angie Lizeth Rodríguez Fajardo is a Colombian public administrator and politician who served as Secretary General of the Presidency from 2025 to 2026 under President Gustavo Petro. A specialist in public management, she has also served as Senior Advisor to the Ministry of Labor under Minister Clara López, advisor to the Comptroller General of Colombia, and advisor to the Ministry of Health and Social Protection under Minister Guillermo Alfonso Jaramillo.

Rodríguez specialized in public management at the Superior School of Public Administration, where she also earned a master's degree in human rights. She holds a gadex executive master's degree in Advanced Management from the University of Cádiz. In May 2023, President Gustavo Petro appointed her as the new general director of administrative department of the presidency. She is notable for her close relationship with Ministers Armando Benedetti and Guillermo Alfonso Jaramillo.

== Notes ==
Political offices
Preceded by Jorge Rojas	Secretary General of the Presidency; 2025–2026	Succeeded by Nhora Mondragón
