= Lena Estrada =

Colombian environmentalist (born 1982)

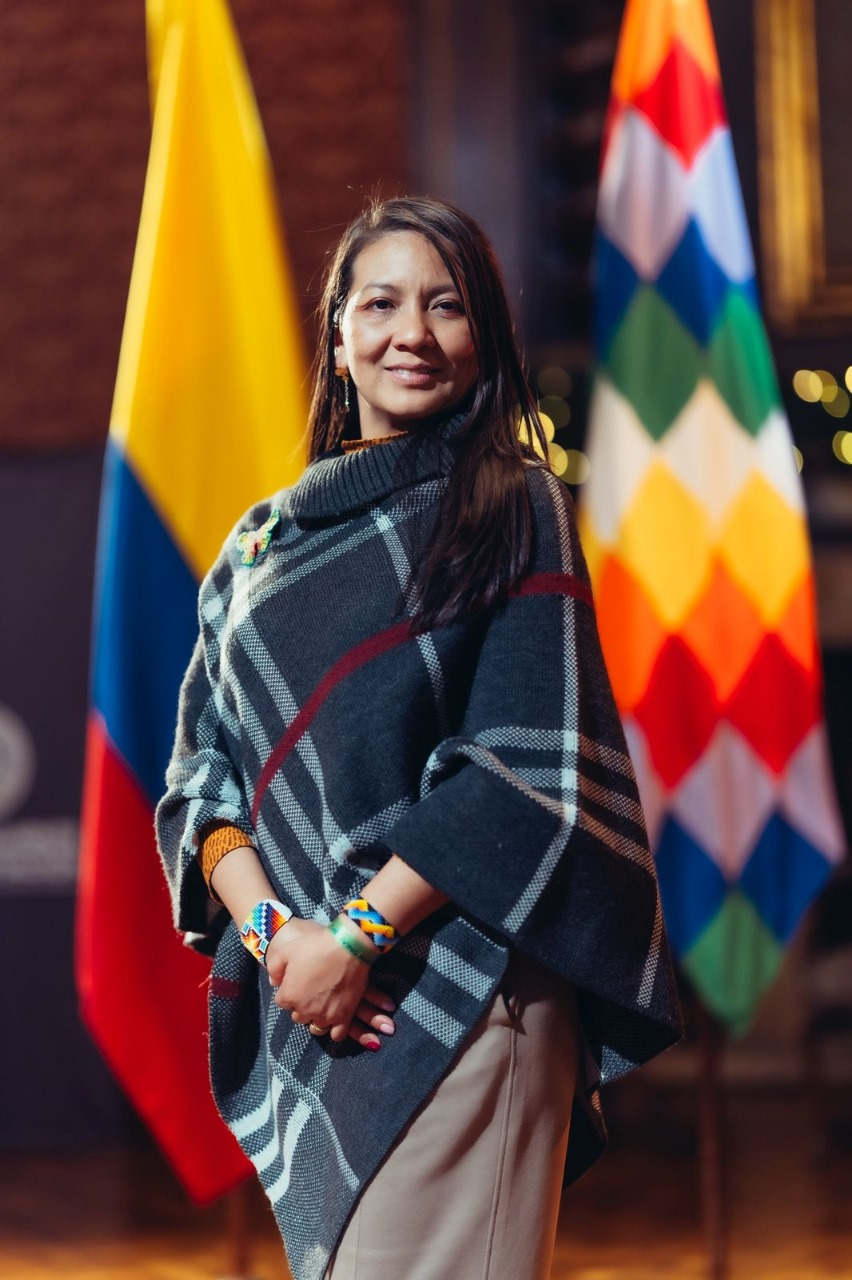
- Official portrait, 2025

Minister of Environment and Sustainable Development
- In office March 3, 2025 – August 5, 2025
- President: Gustavo Petro
- Preceded by: Susana Muhamad
- Succeeded by: Irene Vélez Torres

Director of Diplomatic Academy of the Ministry of Foreign Affairs
- In office May 17, 2024 – March 3, 2025
- President: Gustavo Petro
- Preceded by: Bertha Patricia Alemán
- Succeeded by: Ana María Moreno

Personal details
- Born: Lena Yanina Estrada Añozaki; 1982 (age 43–44) La Chorrera, Amazonas, Colombia
- Party: Alternative Indigenous and Social Movement (2015-present)
- Other political affiliations: Historic Pact for Colombia (2021-2025)
- Education: National University of Colombia (PS); Polytechnic University of Catalonia (ES)

Lena Yanina Estrada Añokazi (born c. 1982) is a Colombian political scientist, environmentalist, and Indigenous leader who served as Minister of Environment and Sustainable Development from March to August 2025 under President Gustavo Petro. She also served as director of the Diplomatic Academy of the Ministry of Foreign Affairs.

Born in La Chorrera, Amazonas, Estrada is the first woman of Indigenous descent to serve as Minister of Environment and Sustainable Development. She studied political science at the National University of Colombia and later environmental sustainability at the Polytechnic University of Catalonia.

== Early life, education and family ==
Lena Yanina Estrada Añokazi was born c. 1982 in La Chorrera, Amazonas. She grew up in the Uitoto Minɨka Indigenous Community. Her mother, Felisa Añokazi, is an Indigenous educator and leader. After graduating from high school, she moved to Bogotá, D.C., where she studied Political Science at the National University of Colombia and later pursued a postgraduate degree in Environmental Sustainability at the Polytechnic University of Catalonia. Estrada also served as a professor at the National University of Colombia and as a research professor for UNESCO. Since 2010, she has led environmental and biodiversity issues, serving as an advisor during Olbar Andrade's term as Governor of Amazonas. Since 2022, she has represented Indigenous peoples at the United Nations Environment Programme.

Estrada ran for the Chamber of Representatives for the Amazonas region in the 2018 parliamentary election, receiving support from the Alternative Indigenous and Social Movement Party, a member of the Desency List, but was unsuccessful.

=== Career ===
In 2024, she was appointed general director of the diplomatic academy of the Ministry of Foreign Affairs, one of her main priorities being to open the diplomatic service to Indigenous and Afro-descendant peoples, historically excluded from diplomatic training in Colombia. She achieved this for the first time.

Her arrival at the Ministry of Environment and Sustainable Development would take place on March 3, 2025, when, after the resignation of Susana Muhamad, President Gustavo Petro would designate her as Muhamad's replacement, with one of her main priorities being the fight against hunting and the responsible management of clean energy and the restoration of ecological areas.

On August 5, after two months in office, Estrada resigned from her position and was replaced as acting head by Irene Vélez Torres.

== Notes ==
Political offices
Preceded by Susana Muhamad	Minister of Environment and Sustainable Development; 2025–2025	Succeeded by Irene Vélez Torres
