= Luis Carlos Villegas Echeverri =

Colombian politician

Luis Carlos Villegas
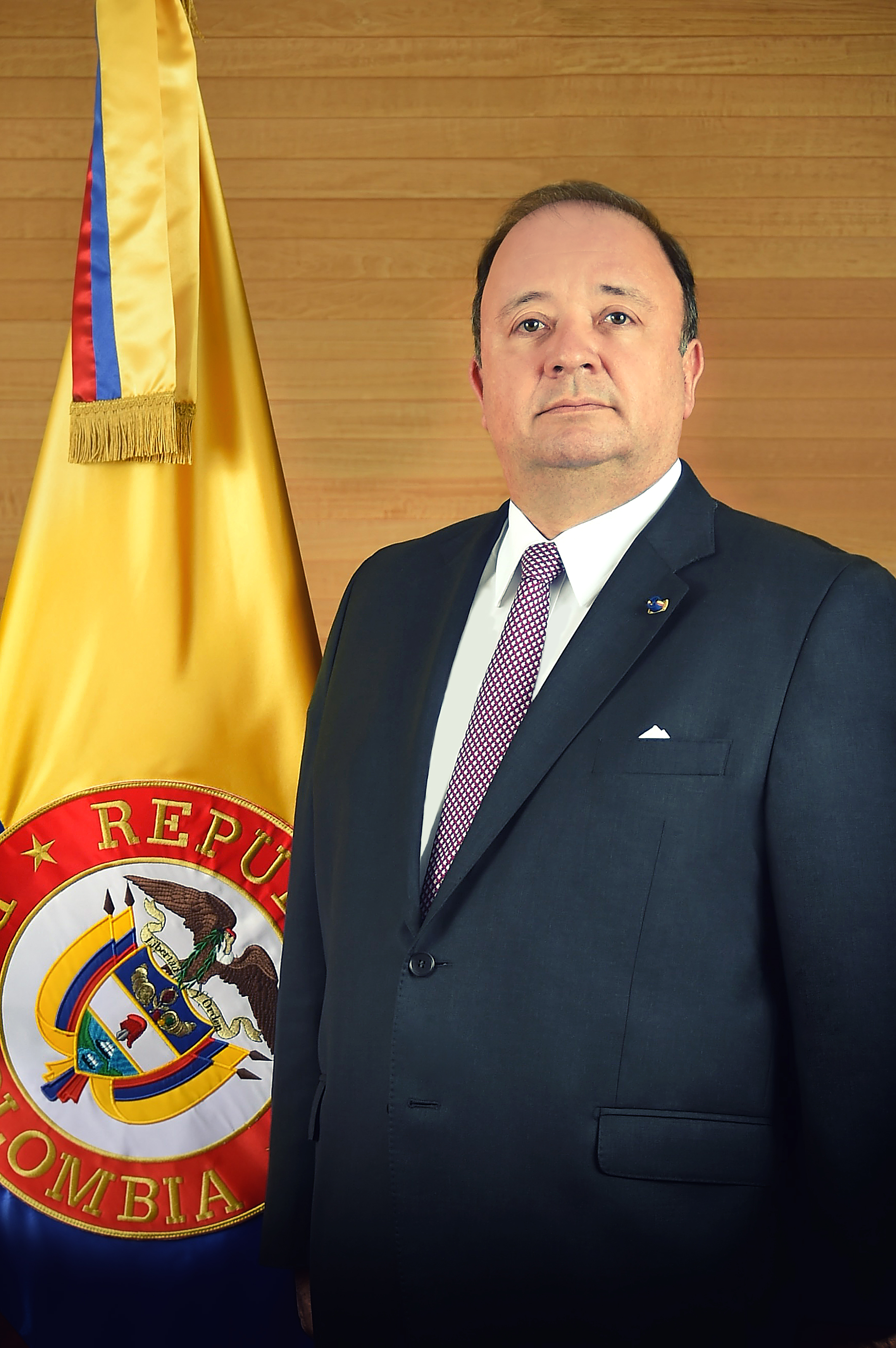

Minister of National Defence
- In office 22 June 2015 – 7 August 2018
- President: Juan Manuel Santos
- Preceded by: Juan Carlos Pinzon
- Succeeded by: Guillermo Botero

Colombia Ambassador to the United States
- In office 22 November 2013 – 15 June 2015
- President: Juan Manuel Santos
- Preceded by: Carlos Urrutia Valenzuela
- Succeeded by: Juan Carlos Pinzon

Governor of Risaralda
- In office 1 January 1985 – 1 January 1986
- President: Belisario Betancur

Personal details
- Born: Luis Carlos Villegas Echeverri; 16 June 1957 (age 69) Pereira, Risaralda, Colombia
- Spouse: María del Carmen Restrepo
- Education: Pontifical Xavierian University

Luis Carlos Villegas Echeverri (born June 16, 1957) is a Colombian politician, lawyer and economist. He was the Governor of Risaralda, and previously served as the Colombian Ambassador to the United States. He served as the Minister of Defence from June 2015 to August 2018.
