= Luis Carlos Restrepo Ramírez =

Colombian politician (born 1954)

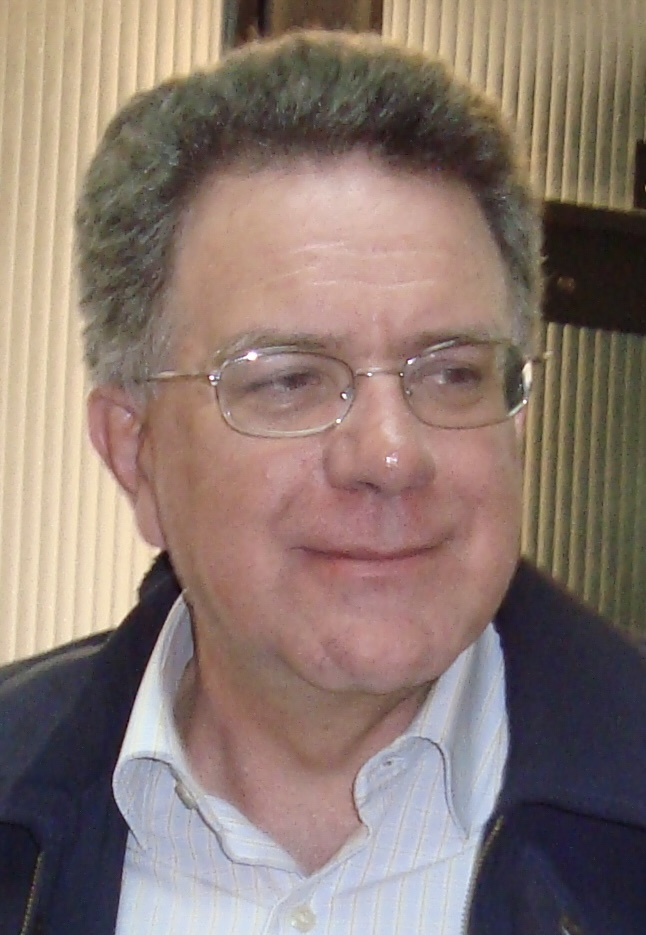

5th High Commissioner for Peace of Colombia
- In office 7 August 2002 – 5 March 2009
- President: Álvaro Uribe Vélez
- Preceded by: Camilo Gómez Alzate
- Succeeded by: Frank Joseph Pearl González

Personal details
- Born: 24 January 1954 (age 72) Filandia, Caldas, Colombia
- Education: National University of Colombia (MBBS, ); Pontifical Xavierian University (MPhil, )
- Profession: Psychiatrist
- Website: luiscarlosrestrepo.com

Luis Carlos Restrepo Ramírez (born 24 January 1954) is a Colombian psychiatrist and philosopher, who served as the 5th High Commissioner for Peace of Colombia from August 2002 to March 2009.

While in Office, he was in charge of the controversial demobilization and disarmament of 32,000 paramilitaries of the United Self-Defense Forces of Colombia and 13,000 guerrilla fighters.

For some time, the Government of Colombia considered him a fugitive, after the Supreme Court of Justice of Colombia issued an international arrest warrant after Restrepo left the country on 8 January 2012 on a flight bound to the United States; his current whereabouts remain unknown, but he is presumed to have obtained political asylum in Canada. Restrepo, who was accused of faking the demobilization of a FARC military unit in 2006, is charged by the Office of the Attorney General of Colombia with conspiracy to commit crime; embezzlement; and arms possession, trafficking, and manufacturing. Restrepo, who was one of the closest allies of the President Álvaro Uribe Vélez, has denied the allegations made against him, and accused the Administration of President Juan Manuel Santos Calderón of mounting a political persecution against him; in this he receives the backing and support of former President Uribe. However, on September 23, 2013, Colombia's Prosecutor General dropped the arrest warrant against Restrepo.

From his exile, Restrepo has shown support for the current Peace talks of President Juan Manuel Santos with FARC rebels.

On May 17, 2025, former peace commissioner Luis Carlos Restrepo was acquitted of false demobilization of the Cacica La Gaitana military unit.

== Personal life ==
Luis Carlos was born on 24 January 1954 in Filandia, Caldas Department to Carlos E. Restrepo Ramírez and Soledad Ramírez Ospina.

== Works ==
- Restrepo Ramírez, Luis Carlos (1983). Libertad y Locura (in Spanish). Bogotá: Ego Puto. ISBN 9789581701377. OCLC 25136158.
- Restrepo Ramírez, Luis Carlos (1989). La trampa de la razón (in Spanish). Bogotá: Arango Editores. OCLC 23255221.
- Restrepo Ramírez, Luis Carlos (1994). La Fruta Prohibida: La Droga en el Espejo de la Cultura. Cuadernillos para el tercer milenio (5) (in Spanish). Cali: Fundación para la Investigación y la Cultura/Libreria Hojas de Hierba. ISBN 9589091105. OCLC 33664148.
- Restrepo Ramírez, Luis Carlos (1994). El derecho a la ternura (in Spanish). Bogotá: Arango. ISBN 9789582708016. OCLC 318245848.
- Restrepo Ramírez, Luis Carlos; Espinel Vallejo, Manuel (1996). Semiología de las Prácticas de Salud (in Spanish). Bogotá: Pontifical Xavierian University. ISBN 9789589502112. OCLC 252649884.
- Restrepo Ramírez, Luis Carlos (1997). Memorias de la Tierra (in Spanish). Armenia: Fondo Mixto para la Promocion de la Cultura y la Artes del Quindio. ISBN 9789589662205. OCLC 253706865.
- Restrepo Ramírez, Luis Carlos (1997). Proyecto para un arca en medio de un diluvio de plomo (in Spanish). Bogotá: Arango Editores. ISBN 9789582700126. OCLC 253911961.
- Restrepo Ramírez, Luis Carlos (1998). Ética del amor y pacto entre géneros (in Spanish). Bogotá: San Pablo. ISBN 9789586079808.
- Restrepo Ramírez, Luis Carlos (2002). Más alla del terror: abordaje cultural de la violencia en Colombia (in Spanish). Bogotá: Ed. Aguilar. ISBN 9789587040470. LCCN 2003448820. OCLC 250014610.
- Restrepo Ramírez, Luis Carlos (2004). El Retorno de lo Sacro (in Spanish). Bogotá: Taurus. ISBN 9789587041842. OCLC 57625132.
- Restrepo Ramírez, Luis Carlos (2005). Justicia y Paz: de la Negociación a la Gracia. Deliberare (in Spanish). Medellín: Instituto Tecnológico Metropolitano. ISBN 9789589751084. OCLC 237608242.
- Restrepo Ramírez, Luis Carlos (2005). Viaje al fondo del mal (in Spanish). Bogotá: Taurus. ISBN 9789587043129. OCLC 777908767.
