= Susana Muhamad =

Colombian environmentalist and politician (born 1977)

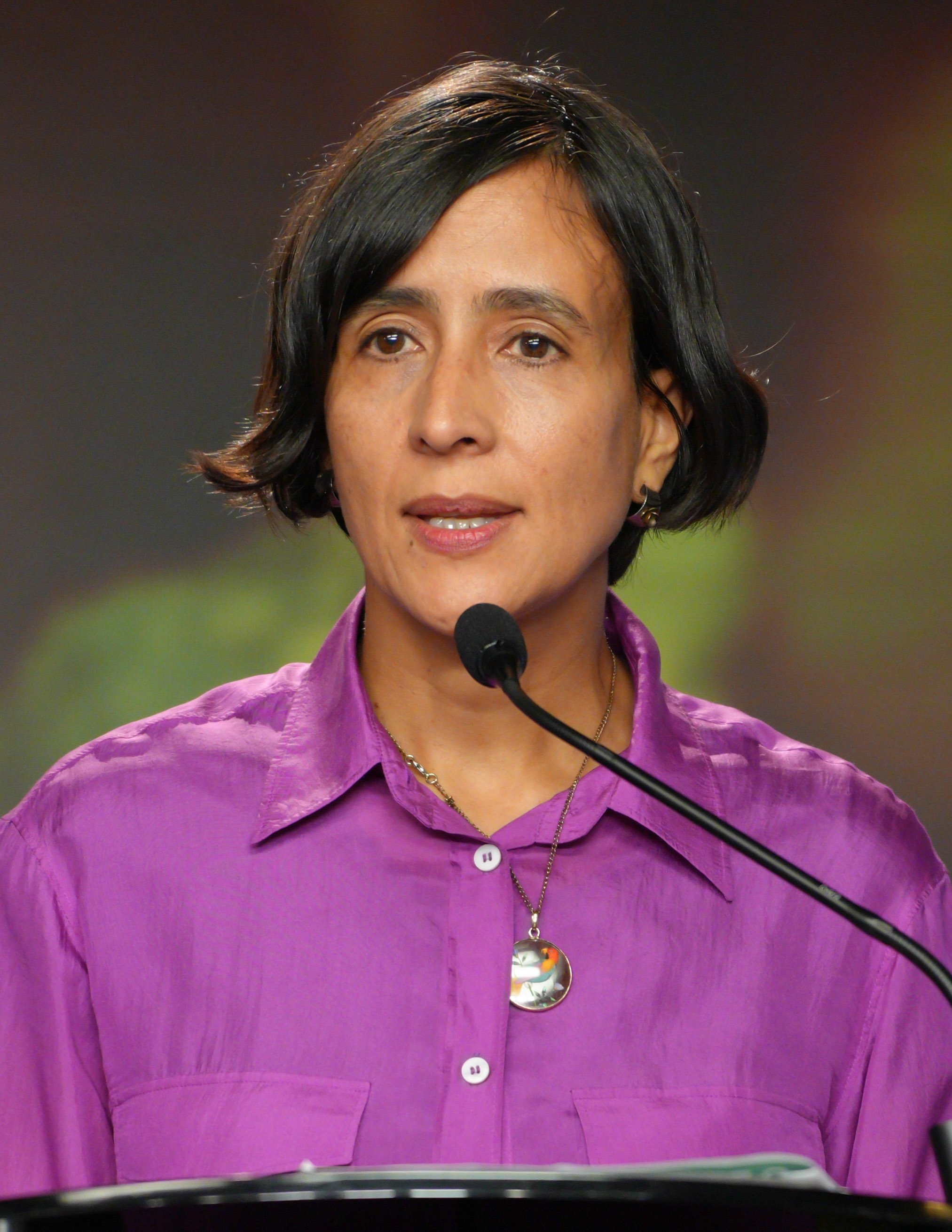
- Muhamad in 2024

Minister of Environment and Sustainable Development
- In office August 7, 2022 – February 9, 2025
- President: Gustavo Petro
- Preceded by: Carlos Eduardo Correa
- Succeeded by: Lena Estrada

Councilor of Bogotá
- In office January 1, 2020 – July 14, 2022
Other political offices 2012‍–‍2014
Secretary of Environment of Bogotá
In office July 2, 2014 – January 1, 2016
Mayor	Gustavo Petro
Preceded by	Néstor García Buitrago
Succeeded by	Francisco Cruz Roble
In office June 27, 2012 – July 13, 2013
Mayor	Gustavo Petro
Preceded by	Margarita Flórez Alonso
Succeeded by	Néstor García Buitrago
Secretary General of Bogotá
In office July 30, 2013 – July 2, 2014
Mayor	Gustavo Petro
Preceded by	Orlando Rodríguez
Succeeded by	Martha Lucía Zamora

Personal details
- Born: María Susana Muhamad González; April 21, 1977 (age 49) Bogotá, D.C., Colombia
- Party: Historic Pact (2026‍–‍present)
- Other political affiliations: Historic Pact for Colombia (2021‍–‍2025); Humane Colombia (2011‍–‍2026)
- Spouse: Pablo Espinosa (m. 2006)
- Education: University of the Andes (BPS); Stellenbosch University (MPS)
- Profession: Politician; political scientist; environmentalist

María Susana Muhamad González (born April 21, 1977) is a Colombian political scientist, environmentalist, politician, and member of Historic Pact who served as Minister of Environment and Sustainable Development from 2022 to 2025.

Born in Bogotá, D.C., Muhamad is one of the most prominent members of Historic Pact. Her environmental leadership and commitment to policies against global warming have made her one of the most influential environmental leaders in the world. Muhamad was the Director for Climate Action Planning for Latin America in the C40 Cities Climate Leadership Group. Her work centers on formulating policies to strengthen Colombia's environmental agenda. These efforts include promoting adherence to international agreements on climate change and biodiversity, advocating for the protection of environmental activists, and pursuing measures to reduce deforestation in the Amazon region. She presided the 2024 United Nations Biodiversity Conference in Cali.

== Early life and education, and career ==
María Susana Muhamad González was born on April 21, 1977, in Bogotá, D.C. Her father is of direct Palestinian descent. Muhamad spent the first three years of her life in the Cedritos neighborhood. When she was four, her family moved to Barranquilla, Atlántico, where her father established several businesses. Her time in the city brought her into close contact with the Arab community, which has a strong presence on the northern coast.

After finishing high school, Muhamad returned to Bogotá, D.C., to study political science at the University of the Andes, graduating in 2002. Following her undergraduate studies, she moved to Stellenbosch, South Africa, where she later pursued a master's degree in Sustainable Development Management and Planning at Stellenbosch University, ultimately obtaining the degree in 2017.

=== Academic career ===
Muhamad worked as a sustainable development consultant for Shell Global Solutions International in The Hague, the Netherlands. She served as President of AIESEC in Colombia in 2000 and has been active in environmental advocacy, collaborating with local communities, non-governmental organizations, and human rights movements.

Her research addresses the interplay between development and sustainability, examining how globalization influences material progress while heightening the need to protect natural resources for future generations. She has analyzed tensions in Western civilization over the past two centuries through various philosophical perspectives and the viewpoints of different stakeholders.

Within Bogotá, she spearheaded a participatory initiative to regulate outdoor advertising in response to public concerns about its proliferation. The project engaged academia, city council members, government agencies, and industry representatives, aiming to formalize environmentally responsible practices around outdoor advertising around Bogotá.

In El Agua en la Ciudad y los Asentamientos Urbanos, she proposes rethinking Bogotá's water management to address vulnerabilities stemming from urban development using strategic environmental assessment. Her recommendations include viewing infrastructure upgrades through a sustainability lens, emphasizing biodiversity preservation and reduced exposure to extreme weather events.

=== Political career ===
Muhamad was secretary of the environment and general secretary of the Mayor's Office of Bogotá. In 2019 she was elected city councilor, a position she held until the first semester of 2022.

In 2021, Muhamad was elected as vice president of the national coordination board of the Colombia Humana party, after this political movement officially received its legal status.

== Minister of Environment and Sustainable Development (2022-2025) ==
On July 5, 2022, then president-elect Gustavo Petro announced the appointment of Muhamad as Minister of Environment and Sustainable Development. Muhamad stated that the environmental sector had been marginalized in previous administrations and advocated for broader community involvement in conservation efforts. She cited Colombia's position as the second most biodiverse country in the world as evidence of the importance of prioritizing environmental policy. As minister, she supported Colombia's ratification of the Escazú Agreement.

In September 2024, Muhamad presented a proposal to replace government revenue generated from fossil fuel investments. The initiative, estimated at $40 billion USD and modeled after Just Energy Transition Partnerships, called for expanding electric transportation, developing renewable energy projects, and funding biodiversity protection. The plan was set to be led by the Inter-American Development Bank, with the United States serving as an informal coordinator. Following the election of President Donald Trump in November 2024, concerns emerged about the plan's stability. Muhamad sought to secure a deal of up to US$10 billion with the Biden administration before Trump took office and suggested China as a possible alternative source of funding. Funds allocated by the US through USAID that would have gone to the country were subsequently frozen as part of the change in US policy priorities.

On February 4, 2025, Muhamad—together with Vice President Francia Márquez and planning chief Alexander Lopez—publicly criticized the nominations of Armando Benedetti and Laura Sarabia to Petro's government during a televised cabinet meeting, citing policy disagreements. Five days later, Muhamad resigned in protest against Benedetti's appointment, alleging instances of violence against women. She stated that she would continue to serve as president of the 2024 United Nations Biodiversity Conference.

=== Fracking ===
One of the issues on which Muhamad focused, which has also been one of the most questioned by the opposition, is fracking. The government seeks to eliminate fracking as a means of extracting oil, since this method of extraction causes irreparable damage to the environment as well as to the atmosphere and water reserves. In June 2023, she made an appearance with Frankie, the activist dinosaur icon from the United Nations Development Program (UNDP), delivering an urgent message to the House of Representatives to address the climate crisis and avoid extinction. There was a call to halt the use of fossil fuels worldwide and to ban fracking in Colombia to prevent further expansion of the extractive frontier.

=== Animal welfare ===
In January 2023, Muhamad announced the creation of a division of animal protection within the ministry's Directorate of Forests, Ecosystems, and Biodiversity, as part of policies supporting animal welfare. This initially led to fears of inaction among conservationists regarding the country's invasive hippopotamus population.

On November 2, 2023, Muhamad revealed plans to control the growing hippopotamus population, estimated to be close to 200 individuals living along the Magdalena River. These involved neutering 40 hippopotamuses per year, as well as culling an unspecified number and relocating some to other countries, including Mexico, India and the Philippines. While experts stated the potential danger of the hippopotamuses for the local ecosystem and agreed with the need to control the population, the plans were criticized for relying too much on the less effective sterilization methods. The risk of legal challenges being brought against culling due to public outcry was also mentioned, as were the logistical costs of exporting the hippopotamuses to other countries, which Muhamad said would be covered by the institutions that will receive the animals. The plans were also criticized by animal rights activists, stating that sterilization would pose risks to both animals and veterinarians, and opposing the culling of healthy individuals.

=== 2024 United Nations Biodiversity Conference ===
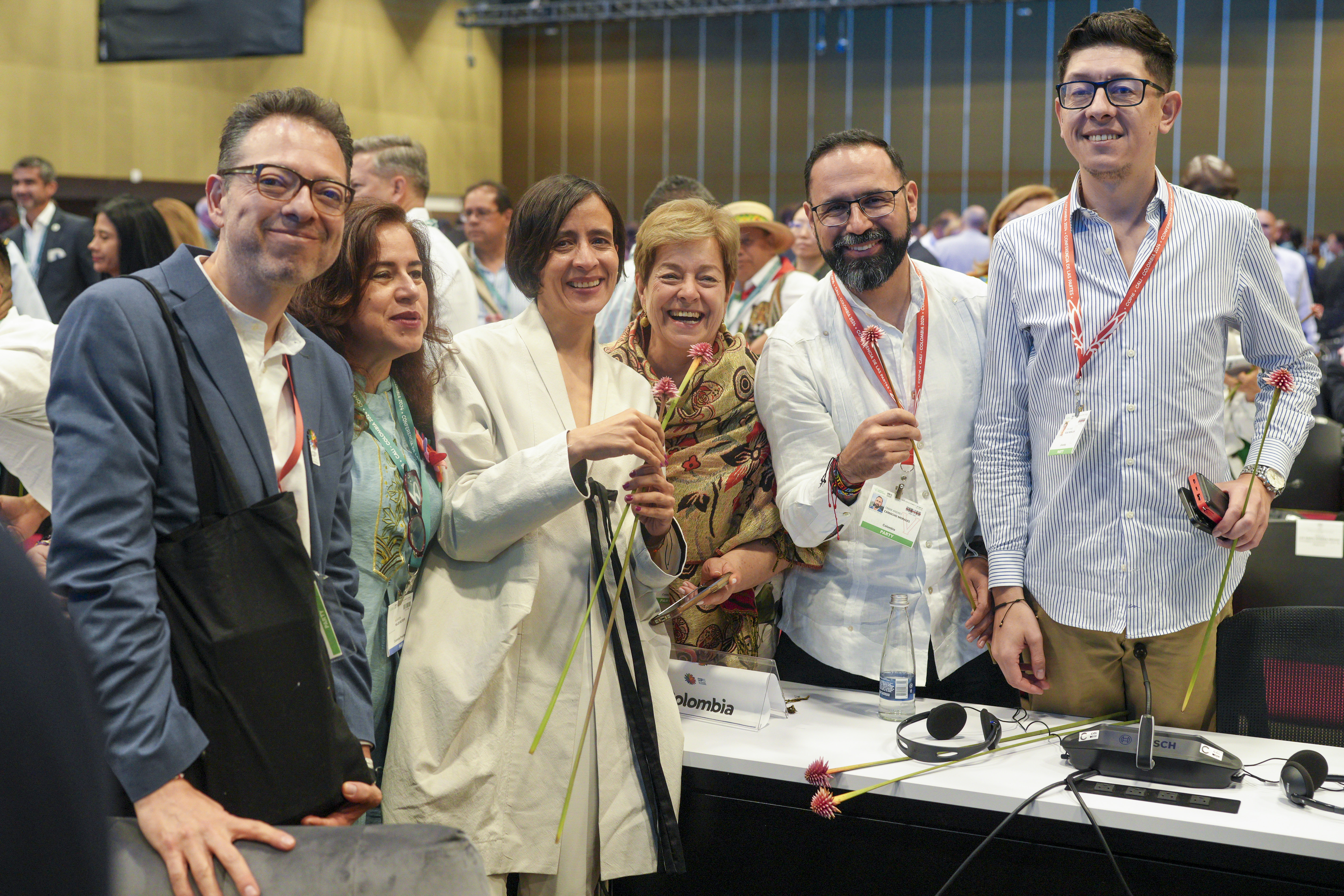
Susana Muhamad (third from left) and members of the Colombian delegation pose for a photo at the opening ceremony of the COP16.

Muhamad served as the president of the 2024 United Nations Biodiversity Conference (COP16) in Cali, lasting from October 21 to November 1. On the inaugural day of the meeting, Muhamad presented Colombia's own National Biodiversity Strategies and Action Plan, called Plan de Acción por la Biodiversidad 2030 ("Plan of Action for Biodiversity 2030"). The document — which was estimated to require a total investment of 76.5 billion pesos, roughly corresponding to over $17.8 billion — set six national goals and 191 targets needed to fulfill the 2022 Global Biodiversity Framework by the end of the decade.

Political offices
Preceded by Margarita Flórez	Secretary of Environment of Bogotá; 2012-2013	Succeeded by Néstor García Buitrago
Preceded by Orlando Rodríguez	Secretary General of Bogotá; 2013-2014	Succeeded by Martha Lucía Zamora
Preceded by Néstor García Buitrago	Secretary of Environment of Bogotá; 2014-2016	Succeeded by Francisco Cruz Roble
Preceded by Carlos Eduardo Correa	Minister of Environment and Sustainable Development; 2022–2025	Succeeded by Lena Estrada
