= Juan Gabriel Uribe Vegalara =

Colombian politician and journalist

2nd Minister of Environment and Sustainable Development of Colombia
- In office September 3, 2012 – September 11, 2013
- President: Juan Manuel Santos Calderón
- Preceded by: Frank Pearl González
- Succeeded by: Luz Helena Sarmiento Villamizar

Senator of Colombia
- In office 30 September 1999 – 20 July 2002

Personal details
- Born: Bogotá, D.C., Colombia
- Party: Conservative
- Spouse(s): Ana María Ruan Perdomo (1988)
- Children: Pablo Uribe Ruan; Manuela Uribe Ruan
- Education: University of the Andes (LLB, )
- Profession: Lawyer, Journalist

Juan Gabriel Uribe Vegalara is a Colombian Conservative Party politician and journalist. He served as the 2nd Minister of Environment and Sustainable Development of Colombia from 2012 to 2013, and as Senator of Colombia from 1998 to 2002. An award-winning journalist, he was Editor-in-chief of El Nuevo Siglo before his appointment as Minister.

== Minister of Environment ==
On 31 August 2012 President Juan Manuel Santos Calderón announced the designation of Uribe as Minister of Environment and Sustainable Development of Colombia in replacement of Frank Pearl González. Uribe was sworn in on 3 September 2012 in a ceremony at the Palace of Nariño.

== Personal life ==
Juan Gabriel is the son of Juan Pablo Uribe Uribe and Elvira Vegalara Rojas. He married Ana María Ruán Perdomo in 1988 with whom he had two children, Pablo and Manuela.
