= Juan Carlos Pinzón =

Colombian politician (born 1972)

Juan Carlos Pinzón Bueno
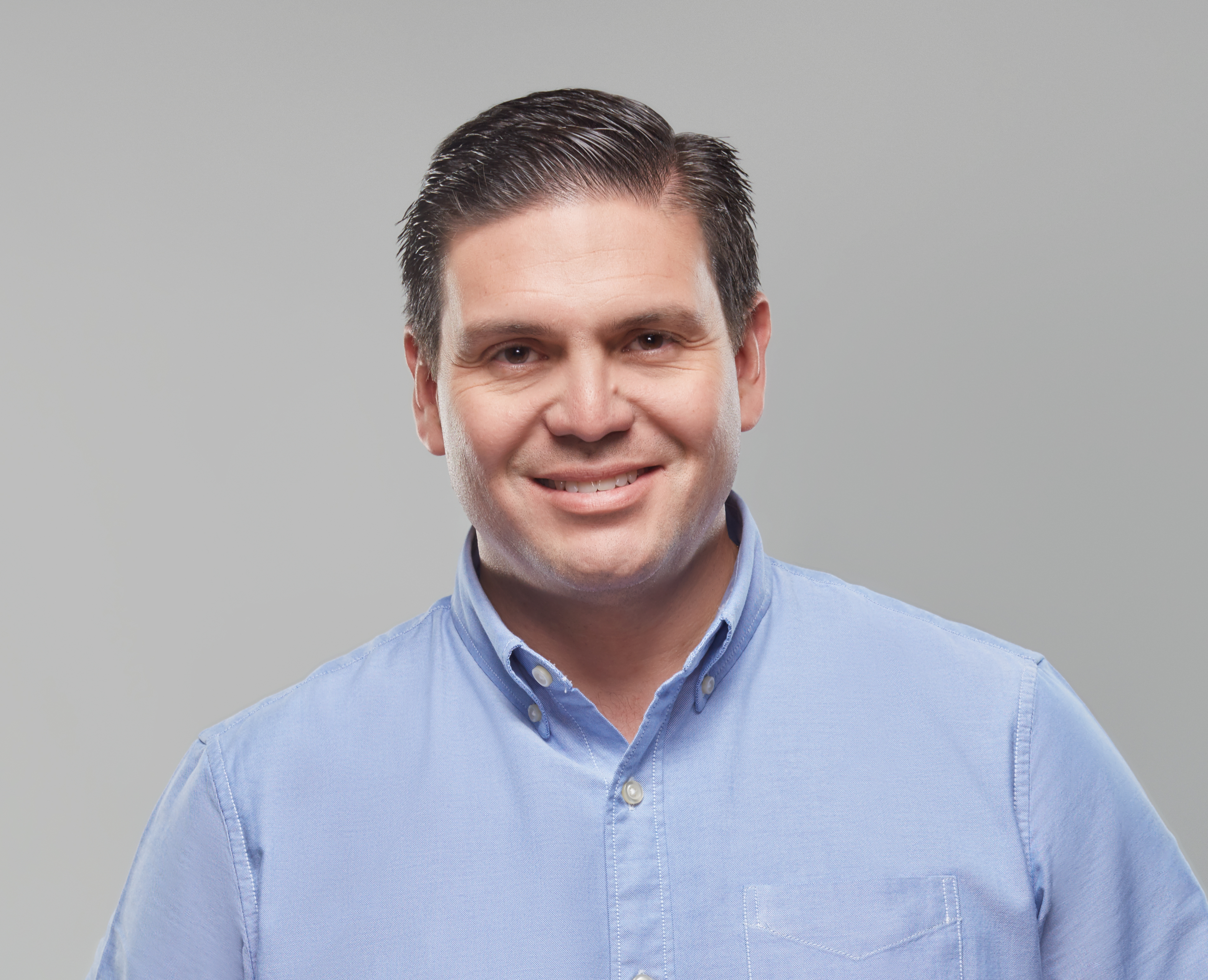

Ambassador of Colombia to the United States
- In office 3 August 2015 – 19 May 2017
- President: Juan Manuel Santos
- Preceded by: Luis Carlos Villegas
- Succeeded by: Camilo Reyes Rodríguez

Minister of National Defence
- In office 5 September 2011 – 22 June 2015
- President: Juan Manuel Santos
- Preceded by: Rodrigo Rivera Salazar
- Succeeded by: Luis Carlos Villegas

Secretary General of the Presidency
- In office 7 August 2010 – 5 September 2011
- President: Juan Manuel Santos
- Preceded by: Bernardo Moreno Villegas
- Succeeded by: Federico Renjifo Vélez

Personal details
- Born: Juan Carlos Pinzón Bueno; 22 December 1972 (age 53) Bogotá, Colombia
- Spouse: Pilar Lozano
- Education: Pontifical Xavierian University (BA, 1996; MSc, 1999); Woodrow Wilson School, Princeton (MPP, 2010)
- Profession: Economist

Juan Carlos Pinzón Bueno (born 22 December 1972) is a Colombian diplomat, politician and economist. He is the former Ambassador of Colombia to the United States and former Minister of Defence. Pinzon comes from a military family, his father was a Colonel in the Colombian Army.

== Minister of Defence ==
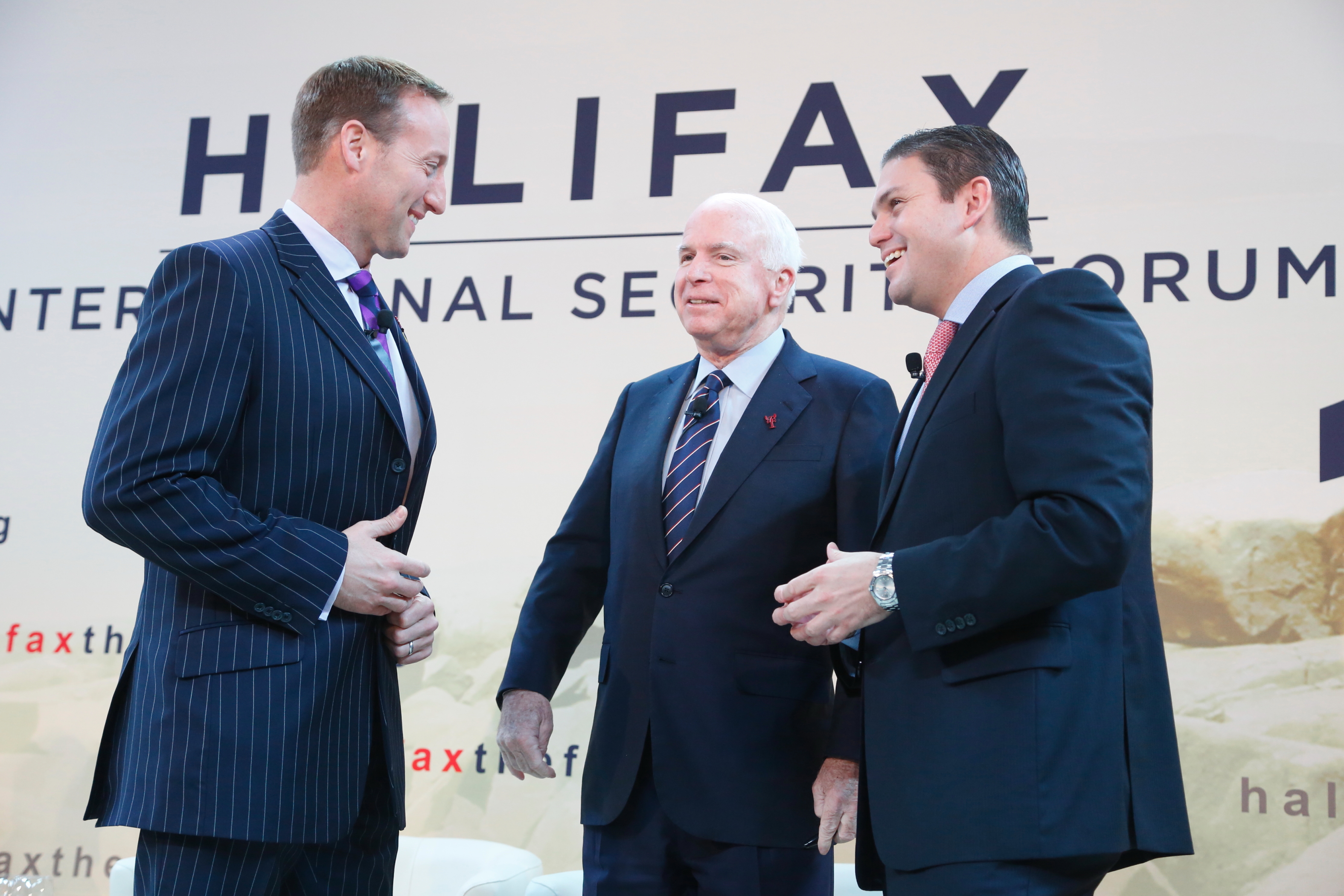
Pinzón with Canadian Minister of National Defence Peter MacKay (left) and US Senator John McCain at the Halifax International Security Forum in 2012

Pinzón received honourable mention for his outstanding academic performance as BSC in economics. He holds a Master's of Science in economics from the Pontifical Xavierian University, where in addition, he was awarded a scholarship for his Master's in Public Policy at Princeton University's Woodrow Wilson School of Public and International Affairs. Pinzón also completed his advanced studies in international relations and strategic studies at The Johns Hopkins University, and in science and technology policy at Harvard University.

As part of his public service, Pinzón served as the Deputy Minister of Defence. In 2010, President Juan Manuel Santos Calderón appointed him as Presidential Chief of Staff. His public and private tenure also includes positions such as, Senior Advisor to the executive director at the World Bank, Vice President of the Colombian Banking Association, Assistant Vice President of Investment Banking at Citigroup, private Secretary and Chief of Staff for the Finance and Public Credit Ministry, and as an Economist for Colombia at Citigroup. The World Economic Forum selected him a Young Global Leader in 2011.

Pinzón has remained an active member of the International Institute for Strategic Studies since 2000. In the early 2000s, he participated in the UNDP Expert Council's efforts to design a democratic security agenda for Colombia. While with the Ministry of Finance, he was responsible for the coordination of the Defence Ministry budget by special request of the Minister.

Pinzón taught economics at the Pontifical Xavierian University and the Universidad de Los Andes. He has also published several articles in recognised academic magazines and newspapers on financial markets, macroeconomic policy and financial policy.

== 2018 Colombian Presidential Election ==
On 19 May 2017, Juan Carlos Pinzón declared his candidacy to become Colombia's next president in the 2018 elections. Pinzón has made his criticisms of the Colombian Peace Process a key element of his campaign, claiming that the FARC guerrilla group has not completely disarmed and that the amnesty program within the peace agreements are unfair to the country's victims. Colombian President Juan Manuel Santos has rejected the criticism and attacked Pinzón personally, frankly stating that the struggle for power brings out the worst in human nature.

Pinzón built a citizen movement called 'Ante Todo Colombia' to collect signatures so he could launch his presidential campaign and after getting more than half a million signatures, he became a Presidential candidate. A month later, he became the Vice President candidate for Germán Vargas Lleras, thus withdrawing his own campaign.

== Personal life ==
Pinzón was born on 22 December 1971 in Bogotá to Coronel Rafael Pinzón Rincón and Marlene Bueno. He is married to María del Pilar Lozano.
