= Frank Pearl González =

Colombian politician (born 1962)

Frank Pearl
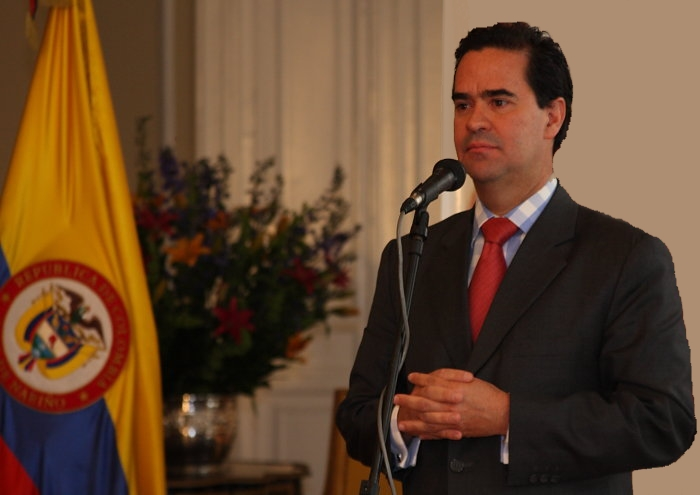

Minister of Environment and Sustainable Development
- In office 27 September 2011 – 3 September 2012
- President: Juan Manuel Santos
- Succeeded by: Juan Gabriel Uribe

6th High Commissioner for Peace
- In office 5 February 2009 – 31 July 2010
- President: Álvaro Uribe
- Preceded by: Luis Carlos Restrepo
- Succeeded by: María Eugenia Pinto

High Presidential Advisor for the Social and Economic Reintegration of People and Groups Up in Arms
- In office 13 September 2006 – 31 July 2010
- President: Álvaro Uribe
- Preceded by: Position established
- Succeeded by: María Eugenia Pinto

Personal details
- Born: 1962 (age 63–64) Bogotá, D.C., Colombia
- Education: University of the Andes (BEc); Richard Ivey School of Business (MBA, 1995) Harvard Kennedy School (MPA, 2011)
- Profession: Economist

Frank Joseph Pearl González (born 1962) is a Colombian economist. He served as the 1st Minister of Environment and Sustainable Development serving in the administration of President Juan Manuel Santos Calderón, and as the 1st High Presidential Advisor for the Social and Economic Reintegration of People and Groups Up in Arms during the administration of President Álvaro Uribe Vélez between 2006 and 2010 during which time he was also entrusted the office of High Commissioner for Peace in replacement of Luis Carlos Restrepo Ramírez, until his resignation from both posts in 2010.

On 19 September 2011, President Juan Manuel Santos Calderón designated Pearl to head the process that divided the Ministry of Environment, Housing, and Territorial Development into two separate portfolios of environment and housing, and afterwards was entrusted the just created Ministry of Environment and Sustainable Development.

== Personal life ==
He was born in 1962 in Bogotá, D.C. to a Canadian father, John (Jackie) Pearl, and a Colombian mother, María Francisca González Gaitán.

Pearl has two sisters, Juanita and Mónica, and two younger brothers, Robert Pearl and William Pearl.

== See also ==
- Sandra Bessudo Lion
