= Rodrigo Rivera Salazar =

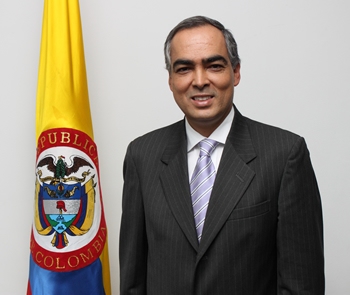

Colombian Ambassador to Belgium
- In office 1 December 2011 – 31 January 2018
- President: Juan Manuel Santos Calderón
- Preceded by: Carlos Holmes Trujillo García
- Succeeded by: Sergio Jaramillo Caro

Colombian Ambassador to Luxembourg
- In office 28 March 2012 – 31 January 2018
- President: Juan Manuel Santos Calderón
- Preceded by: Carlos Holmes Trujillo García
- Succeeded by: Sergio Jaramillo Caro

Colombian Ambassador to the European Union
- In office 18 January 2012 – 31 January 2018
- President: Juan Manuel Santos Calderón
- Preceded by: Carlos Holmes Trujillo García
- Succeeded by: Sergio Jaramillo Caro

Minister of National Defence
- In office 7 August 2010 – 5 September 2011
- President: Juan Manuel Santos
- Preceded by: Gabriel Silva Luján
- Succeeded by: Juan Carlos Pinzón

Senator of Colombia
- In office 20 July 1998 – 20 July 2006

Member of the Chamber of Representatives
- In office 20 July 1990 – 20 July 1998
- Constituency: Risaralda

President of the Chamber of Representatives
- In office 20 July 1996 – 20 July 1997
- Preceded by: Álvaro Benedetti Vargas
- Succeeded by: Giovanni Lamboglia Mazzilli

Personal details
- Born: 20 April 1963 (age 63) Pereira, Risaralda, Colombia
- Party: Colombian Liberal Party
- Spouse: Claudia Carrasquilla (1993-present)
- Children: Sara Rivera Carrasquilla; Manuella Rivera Carrasquilla
- Education: Free University of Colombia
- Profession: Lawyer

Rodrigo Rivera Salazar (born 20 April 1963) is a Colombian politician. A lawyer, diplomat, professor and journalist, Rivera served in the Congress first as a Member of the Chamber of Representatives for two terms from 1990 to 1998, and then as Senator of Colombia for two terms from 1998 to 2006, when he retired from Congress to run, ultimately unsuccessfully, for the 2006 Liberal presidential nomination. In 2010, Rivera was appointed Minister of National Defence of Colombia by President Juan Manuel Santos Calderón and served until his resignation the following year.

Fresh out of College, he was elected Councilman to the Pereira City Council at the age of 20 and served on it until 1989, during this time he also worked as Professor of Constitutional Law at his alma mater, the Free University of Pereira, and wrote as a columnist for the nationally syndicated newspaper of El Espectador, and the local newspaper La Tarde. In 1997 he was recognized by the Junior Chamber International as an Outstanding Young Persons of the World for his work as President of the Chamber of Representatives during the impeachment trial against President Ernesto Samper Pizano. In 2003 he was elected President of the Colombia Liberal Party Directorate. In 2007, in his first break from politics, he attended the Washington College of Law as a Humphrey Fellow, specializing in Economic Development and Human Rights.

On 31 August 2011, President Santos announced the resignation of Minister Rivera and offered him the post of Ambassador of Colombia to Belgium that is concurrently accredited to Luxembourg and the European Union. He has occupied that position since then

== Minister of Defence ==
Upon his return to Colombia in 2009, Rivera supported the controversial proposal for a referendum to decide on a third presidential term for President Álvaro Uribe Vélez, and openly supported Uribe's Democratic Security Policies. When it was announced that Uribe would not run for re-election because of the ruling passed down by Constitutional Court of Colombia, Rivera threw his support behind Juan Manuel Santos Calderón, Uribe's Minister of Defence and presidential nominee for the Party of the U, becoming the Political Manager of Santos' campaign.

When Santos won the 2010 Colombian presidential election, he named Rivera Minister of National Defence on 28 July 2010, pending his inauguration into office, and when this took place on 7 August 2010, Rivera was sworn in as the new Minister of National Defence.

== Selected works ==
- Rivera Salazar, Rodrigo (2001). Hacia Un Nuevo Federalismo Para Colombia [Towards a New Federalism in Colombia] (in Spanish). Bogotá: La Oveja Negra. ISBN 978-958-06-1001-4. OCLC 253354347.
- Rivera Salazar, Rodrigo (2004). Colombia Fragmentada: El Siguiente Paso: Un Nuevo Consenso Por Lo Social [Colombia Fragmented: The Next Step: A New Social Consensus] (in Spanish). Bogotá: La Oveja Negra. ISBN 978-958-06-1060-1. OCLC 56723192.
