= Ministry of National Defense (Colombia) =

Government ministry of Colombia

- Ministerio de Defensa Nacional

Ministry overview
- Formed: 24 December 1965
- Preceding Ministry: Ministry of War
- Headquarters: Carrera 54 № 26–25; Bogotá, Colombia; 04°38′40.83″N 74°05′44.07″W
- Annual budget: COP$11,035,519,376,067 (2012); COP$12,645,417,534,968 (2013); COP$13,076,723,040,000 (2014)
- Ministry executive: Jorge Eduardo Mora, Minister
- Website: www.mindefensa.gov.co

The Ministry of National Defence (Spanish: Ministerio de Defensa Nacional) is the national executive ministry of the Government of Colombia charged with coordinating and supervising all agencies and functions of the government relating directly to national security and the military forces of Colombia, similar to the defense ministries in other countries. It is composed of the National Army, Navy, Aerospace Force and the National Police.

== List of ministers ==
=== Ministers of War ===
Minister (a)	Period
Gral. Pedro Briceño Méndez	1821–1825
Gral. Carlos Soublette	1825–1828
Gral. Rafael Urdaneta	1828–1829
Gral. Pedro Alcántara Herrán	1830
Gral. José Miguel Pey	1830–1831
Gral. José Marìa Obando	1831–1832
Gral. José Hilario López	1832–1833
Gral. Antonio Obando	1833–1837
Gral. José Hilario López	1837–1838
Gral. Tomás Cipriano de Mosquera	1838–1840
Gral. José Acevedo	1841–1845
Gral. Joaquín París Ricaurte	1845
Gral. Juan María Gómez	1845–1846
Gral. Joaquín Barriga	1846–1849
Gral. Tomás Herrera	1849–1850
Gral. Valerio Barriga	1851–1853
Cnel. Santiago Frasser	1853
Gral. Pedro Alcántara Herrán	1854–1855
Gral. José María Ortega	1856–1861
Gral. Tomás Cipriano de Mosquera	1861–1863
Gral. Rafael Mendoza	1864
Gral. Francisco Barriga	1864–1866
Gral. Rudesindo López	1866–1867
Gral. Sergio Camargo Pinzón	1868–1870
Gral. Santos Acosta	1871–1872
Gral. Ramón Santodomingo Vila	1873–1875
Gral. Santos Acosta	1875–1876
Gral. Fernando Ponce	1877
Gral. Ezequiel Hurtado	1878–1879
Gral. Eliseo Payan	1880–1882
Gral. Juan Mateus	1882–1884
Gral. José María Campo	1884–1886
Gral. Leopoldo Cuervo	1887–1890
Gral. Olegario Rivera	1890–1892
Gral. Antonio Cuervo	1893–1895
Gral. Pedro Rivera	1896–1898
Gral. Jorge Holguin	1899
Gral. José Santos	1900
Gral. Próspero Pinzón Romero	1900
Gral. José Domingo Ospina	1900–1901
Gral. Ramón González Valencia	1901
Gral. Pedro Nel Ospina	1901
José Vicente Concha Ferreira	1901–1902
Gral. Aristides Fernández Mora	1902–1903
Gral. Alfredo Vásquez Cobo	1903–1904
Gral. Diego Castro	1904–1905
Gral. Diego Euclides de Angulo	1905–1906
Manuel Castro	1906
Gral. Manuel María Sanclemente	1906–1908
Gral. Víctor Calderón	1908–1909
Gral. Nicolás Perdomo	1909
Gral. Alfredo Vásquez Cobo	1909
Gral. Jorge Marcelo Holguín Mallarino	1909
Gral. Diego Euclides de Angulo	1909
Gral. Luis Enrique Bonilla	1909
Gral. Pedro Rivera	1909
José Medina Calderón	1909–1910
Juan Bautista Valencia	1910
Gral. Mariano Ospina Vásquez	1910–1911
Gral. José Manuel Araújo	1911–1914
Gral. Isaías Luján	1914–1915
Guillermo Valencia Castillo	1915
Gral. Pedro Justo Berrío	1915
Antonio José Cadavid	1915–1916
Gral. Salvador Franco	1916–1918
Jorge Roa	1918–1921
Bonifacio Vélez	1921
Aristóbulo Archila	1921–1922
Carlos Vélez Daníes	1922
José Ulises Osorio	1922–1923
Gral. Alfonso Jaramillo	1923–1924
Gral. Carlos Jaramillo Isaza	1924–1925
Francisco Solórzano	1925–1926
Ignacio Rengifo	1926–1929
Alejandro Cabal Pombo	1929
Gral. José Joaquín Villamizar	1929
Gral. Agustín Morales Olaya	1929–1931
Carlos Adolfo Urueta	1931–1932
Carlos Arango Vélez	1932–1934
Cptán. Carlos Uribe Gaviria	1934
Alberto Pumarejo	1934
Marco Aurelio Auli	1934–1935
Benito Hernandez Bustos	1935–1936
Plinio Mendoza Neira	1936–1937
Alberto Pumarejo	1937–1938
José Joaquín Castro Martínez	1938–1939
Gonzalo Restrepo	1939–1942
Alejandro Galvis Galvis	1942–1943
Ramón Santodomingo	1943
Alberto Arango Tavera	1943
Gonzalo Restrepo	1943–1944
Gral. Domingo Espinel	1944–1945
Luis Tamayo	1945–1946
Carlos Sánz de Santamaría	1946–1947
Fabio Lozano y Lozano	1947–1948
Fernando Londoño y Londoño	1948
Teniente General Germán Ocampo Herrera	1948–1949
Eduardo Zuleta Àngel	1949
Gral. Rafael Sánchez Amaya	1949–1950
Roberto Urdaneta Arbeláez	1950–1951
José María Bernal	1951–1953
Lucio Pabón Núñez	1953
Gral. Gustavo Berrío	1953–1954
Gral. Gabriel París Gordillo	1954–1957
Gral. Alfonso Saiz	1957–1959
Gral. Rafael Hernández	1959–1962
Gral. Alberto Ruiz Novoa	1962–1965
Gral. Gabriel Rebeiz	1965–1967

=== Ministers of National Defense ===
Order	Name	Took office	Left office	President	Ref.
1st	Gabriel Rebeiz Pizarro	1 January 1966	7 August 1966	Guillermo León Valencia	
1st	Gabriel Rebeiz Pizarro	7 August 1966	22 January 1967	Carlos Lleras Restrepo	
2nd	Gerardo Ayerbe Chaux	2 September 1968	7 August 1970	Carlos Lleras Restrepo	
3rd	Hernando Currea Cubides	7 August 1970	7 August 1974	Misael Pastrana Borrero	
4th	Abraham Varón Valencia	7 August 1974	7 August 1978	Alfonso López Michelsen	
5th	Luis Carlos Camacho Leyva	7 August 1978	7 August 1982	Julio César Turbay	
6th	Fernando Landazábal Reyes	7 August 1982	19 January 1983	Belisario Betancur	
7th	Gustavo Matamoros D'Costa	20 January 1984	5 January 1985	Belisario Betancur	
8th	Miguel Vega Uribe	9 January 1985	7 August 1986	Belisario Betancur	
9th	Rafael Samudio Molina	7 August 1986	7 August 1988	Virgilio Barco	
10th	Manuel Jaime Guerrero Paz	8 November 1988	10 January 1989	Virgilio Barco	
11th	Oscar Botero Restrepo	7 August 1990	7 August 1990	Virgilio Barco	
11th	Oscar Botero Restrepo	7 August 1990	6 August 1991	César Gaviria	
12th	Rafael Pardo Rueda	7 August 1991	7 August 1994	César Gaviria	
13th	Fernando Botero Zea	7 August 1994	24 January 1995	Ernesto Samper	
14th	Juan Carlos Esguerra Portocarrero	7 August 1995	10 January 1997	Ernesto Samper	
15th	Guillermo Alberto González Mosquera	4 February 1997	24 August 1997	Ernesto Samper	
16th	Gilberto Echeverri Mejía	10 April 1997	7 August 1998	Ernesto Samper	
17th	Rodrigo Lloreda Caicedo	7 August 1998	10 March 1999	Andrés Pastrana	
18th	Luis Fernando Ramirez Acuña	30 May 1998	7 August 2001	Andrés Pastrana	
19th	Gustavo Bell	11 June 2001	7 August 2002	Andrés Pastrana	
20th	Marta Lucía Ramírez	7 August 2002	10 July 2003	Álvaro Uribe	
21st	Jorge Alberto Uribe Echavarría	9 November 2003	7 August 2005	Álvaro Uribe	
22nd	Camilo Alfonso Ospina Bernal	19 July 2005	7 August 2006	Álvaro Uribe	
23rd	Juan Manuel Santos	19 July 2006	18 March 2009	Álvaro Uribe	
-	Freddy Padilla de León	23 May 2009	6 August 2009	Álvaro Uribe	
24th	Gabriel Silva Luján	7 August 2009	7 August 2010	Álvaro Uribe	
25th	Rodrigo Rivera Salazar	7 August 2010	11 September 2011	Juan Manuel Santos	
26th	Juan Carlos Pinzón Bueno	5 September 2011	7 June 2015	Juan Manuel Santos	
27th	Luis Carlos Villegas Echeverri	19 May 2015	7 August 2018	Juan Manuel Santos	
28th	Guillermo Botero	7 August 2018	6 November 2019	Iván Duque	
-	Luis Fernando Navarro Jiménez	6 de noviembre de 2019	12 November 2019	Iván Duque	
29th	Carlos Holmes Trujillo	12 November 2019	17 January 2021	Iván Duque	(Note: Died in office, 26 January 2021)
-	Luis Fernando Navarro Jiménez	18 January 2021	31 January 2021	Iván Duque	
30th	Diego Molano	1 February 2021	7 August 2022	Iván Duque	
31st	Iván Velásquez Gómez	7 August 2022	20 February 2025	Gustavo Petro	
32nd	Pedro Arnulfo Sánchez	3 March 2025	7 August 2026	Gustavo Petro	
33rd	Jorge Eduardo Mora	7 August 2026	Incumbent	Abelardo de la Espriella	
