= Daniel García-Peña =

Colombian diplomat (born 1957)

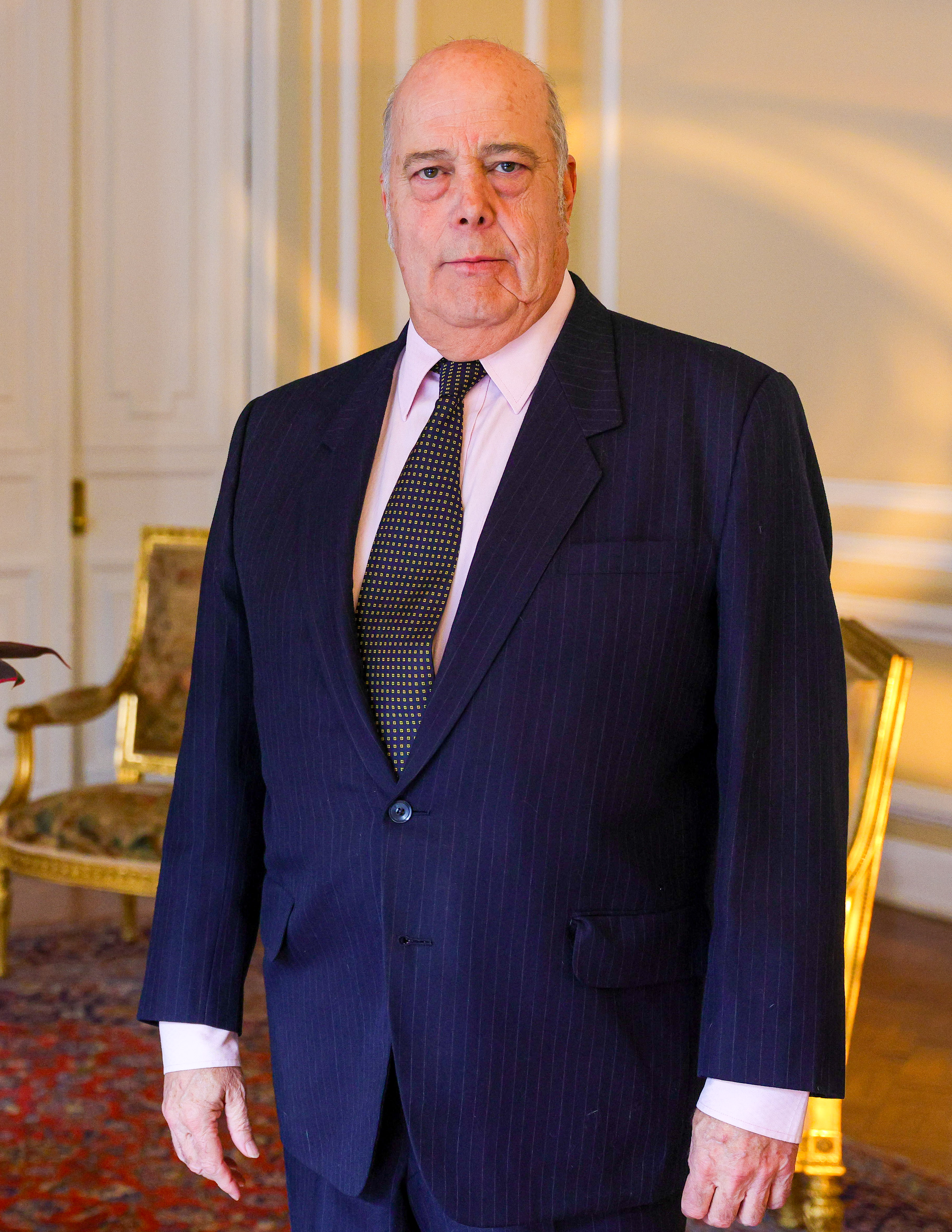
- Inaugural portrait, 2024

Colombia Ambassador to the United States
- In office 15 July 2024 – 7 August 2026
- President: Gustavo Petro
- Preceded by: Luis Gilberto Murillo

Deputy Minister of Foreign Affairs
- In office 7 April 2024 – 6 June 2024
- President: Gustavo Petro
- Preceded by: Francisco Coy
- Succeeded by: Jorge Rojas

Personal details
- Born: Daniel García-Peña Jaramillo; 1957 (age 68–69) Bogotá, D.C., Colombia
- Party: Humane Colombia (2020-present)
- Spouse: María Gaitán (m. 2009)
- Education: Belmont Abbey College (LLB)

Daniel García-Peña Jaramillo (born c. 1957) is a Colombian historian, academic, journalist, politician and diplomat who has served as Colombian ambassador to the United States since 2024. A member of the Humane Colombia party, he previously served as deputy minister of foreign affairs and secretary general of the Alternative Democratic Pole.

Born in Bogotá, D.C., García-Peña studied political science at Belmont Abbey College. He served as a professor in the Department of Political Science at the National University of Colombia.

Political offices
Preceded by Francisco Coy	Deputy Minister of Foreign Affairs; 2024-2024	Succeeded by Jorge Rojas
Diplomatic posts
Preceded by Luis Gilberto Murillo	Colombian Ambassador to the United States; 2024-2026	Incumbent
