= Cabinet of Gustavo Petro =

Members of President Gustavo Petro's Cabinet

Petro Cabinet
- Cabinet of Colombia
- 2022–2026
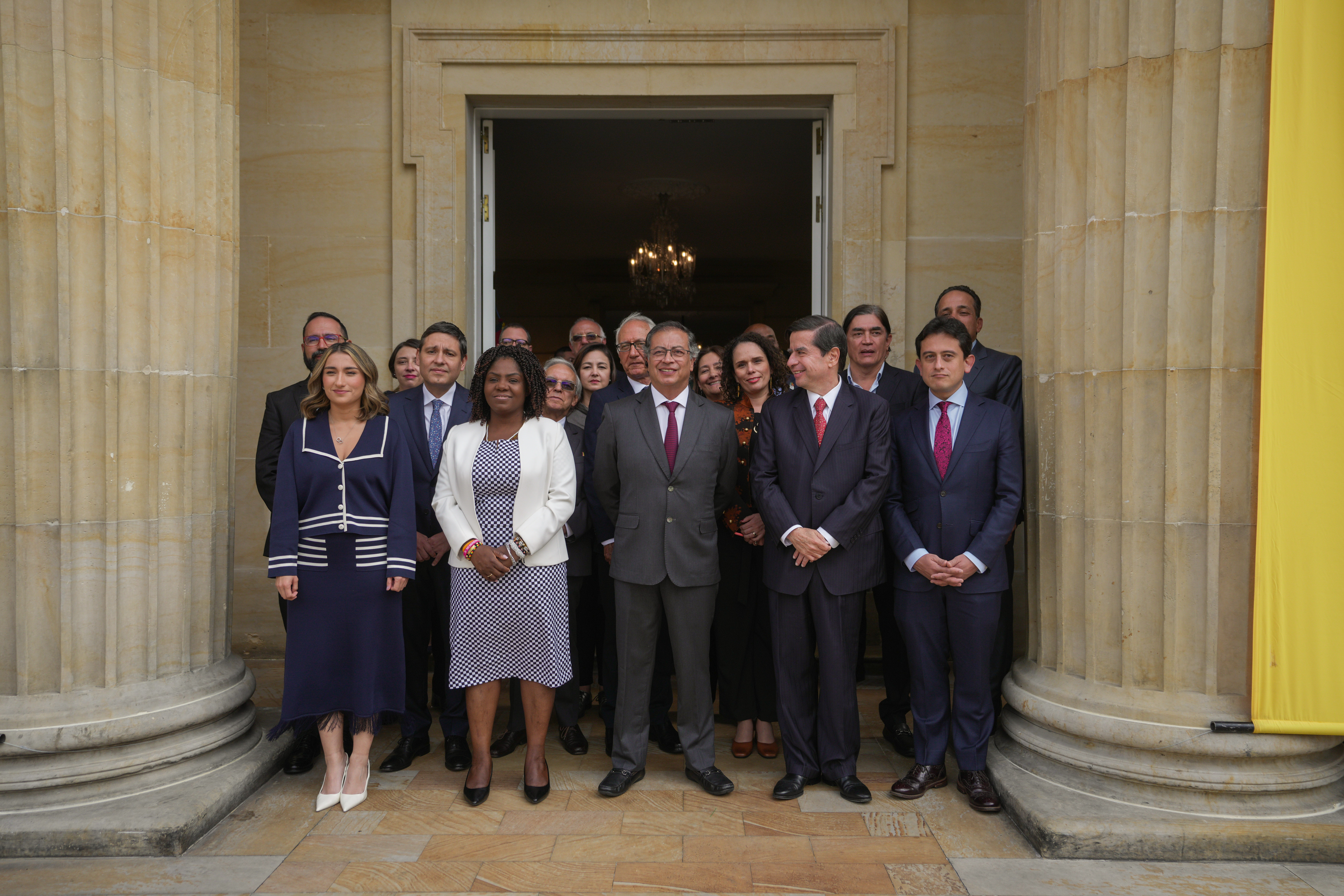
- Cabinet of President Gustavo Petro on July 20, 2024
- Date established: 7 August 2022
- Date dissolved: 7 August 2026

Leadership and composition
- President: Gustavo Petro
- Vice President: Francia Márquez
- President's history: 2022–2026
- No. of ministers: 23 (incl. Cabinet-level members)
- Member parties: Historic Pact; Green Party; ASI; AICO; MAIS
- Status in legislature: Majority (coalition) (2022–2023); Minority (coalition) (2023–2026)
- Opposition parties: Democratic Center; Radical Change; League of Anti-Corruption Governors; Oxygen Green Party

Formation and history
- Advice and consent: Senate
- Election: 2022 Colombian presidential election
- Legislature term: 9th Congress of Colombia
- Predecessor: Cabinet of Iván Duque
- Successor: Cabinet of Abelardo de la Espriella

Gustavo Petro assumed office as President of Colombia on August 7, 2022. The President has the power to nominate members of his Cabinet at his own discretion, in accordance with the Constitution of Colombia.

After the confirmation and ratification of the ruling coalition, along with the other Majority Parties in Congress, the presidents of the three respective Conservative, Liberal and U parties met to obtain cabinet representation through one, two or three departments' executives. The creation of the Cabinet was part of the transition of power after the 2022 Colombian presidential elections.

As a result of the political alliance between Petro and the majority parties, Néstor Osuna, Minister of Justice and Law, and Catalina Velasco, Minister of Housing, City, and Territory, were confirmed as political representatives of the Liberal Party. This came after Petro's rejection of other candidates proposed by the party as in their opinion, they did not meet the requirements for the post. The Liberals considered withdrawing from the government, but a meeting between the two ministers with parliamentarians and party president César Gaviria consolidated support.

The Minister of Transport Guillermo Reyes is the representation in the cabinet of the Conservative Party, as confirmed by Reyes himself in several interviews. For her part, the Minister of Information Technology and Communications, Sandra Urrutia, is the representation in the cabinet of the Party of the U, as confirmed by different media.

In addition to the 6 heads of executive departments and the 5 members attached to the Administrative Department of the presidency, there are eleven cabinet-level officials.

This page documents the confirmation process for cabinet candidates in the Gustavo Petro administration. They are listed according to the order of precedence of Colombia.

== Elected officials ==
=== President ===
On 4 May 2022, it was announced that leftist leader Gustavo Petro had defeated incumbent Anti-Corruption candidate Rodolfo Hernandez in the 2022 presidential election. Gustavo Petro received 11,292,758 electoral votes compared to 10,04,656 electoral votes for Hernandez; more than 10 million was needed to win the presidency. He took office on 7 August 2022.

President of Colombia
| Portrait | Name | Date of birth | Background | Reference |
|---|---|---|---|---|
| | Gustavo Petro | April 16, 1960 (age 66) | Senator of Colombia (2006-2010) (2018-2022); Mayor of Bogotá (2012-2014) (2014-2015); Member of Chamber of Representatives (1991-1994) (1998-2006) | |

=== Vice President ===
On March 13, 2022, after the result of the primaries, in which Márquez came out with the second highest vote behind Gustavo Petro, she would be announced on March 23 as Gustavo Petro's running mate.

Vice President of Colombia
| Portrait | Name | Date of birth | Background | Reference |
|---|---|---|---|---|
| | Francia Márquez | December 1, 1981 (age 44) | Environmental activist | |

== Cabinet ==
Cabinet of President Gustavo Petro
Elected to office – all other cabinet members serve at the pleasure of the president Serving in an acting capacity (one at present)
| Office Date announced / confirmed | Designee | Office Date announced / confirmed | Designee |
| Vice President; Announced 23 March 2022; Elected 19 June 2022; Assumed office 7 August 2022 | Environment Activist; Francia Márquez of Cauca | Minister of the Interior; Announced 26 April 2022; Assumed office 3 March 2025 | Casa de Nariño of Chief of Staff; Armando Benedetti of Atlántico |
| Minister of Foreign Affairs; Announced 6 July 2025; Assumed office 8 July 2025 | Economist; Rosa Yolanda Villavicencio of Bogotá, D.C. | Minister of Finance and Public Credit; Announced 20 March 2025; Assumed office 22 March 2025 | President of the Bicentennial Group; Germán Ávila of Bogotá, D.C. |
| Minister of Justice and Law; Announced 20 June 2022; Assumed office 7 August 2022 | Magistrate of the Superior Council of Judicature; Néstor Osuna of Bogotá, D.C. | Minister of National Defence; Announced 20 June 2022; Assumed office 7 August 2022 | Head of the International Commission; Iván Velásquez of Antioquia |
| Minister of Agriculture and Rural Development; Announced 26 April 2023; Assumed office 1 May 2023 | Lawyer; Jhenifer Mojica of Santander | Minister of Health and Social Protection; Announced 26 April 2023; Assumed office 1 May 2023 | Mayor of Ibague; Guillermo Jaramillo of Tolima |
| Minister of Labour; Announced 20 June 2022Assumed office 11 August 2022 | Senator of Colombia; Gloria Ramírez of Caldas | Minister of Mines and Energy; Announced 24 July 2023Assumed office 4 August 2023 | Electrical engineer and Physicist; Andrés Camacho of Bogotá, D.C. |
| Minister of Commerce, Industry and Tourism; Announced 20 June 2022Assumed office 11 August 2022 | Deputy Rector of the National University; Germán Umaña of Bogotá, D.C. | Minister of National Education; Announced 27 February 2023Assumed office 27 February 2023 | Deputy Minister of Higher Education; Aurora Vergara of Cauca Valley |
| Minister of Environment and Sustainable Development; Announced 20 June 2022Assumed office 11 August 2022 | Councilor of Bogotá; Susana Muhamad of Bogotá, D.C. | Minister of Housing, City and Territory; Announced 20 June 2022Assumed office 11 August 2022 | Secretary of Habitat of Bogotá; Catalina Velasco of Bogotá, D.C. |
| Minister of Information Technologies and Communications; Announced 26 April 2023; Assumed office 1 May 2023 | Director of the DAPR; Mauricio Lizcano of Antioquia | Minister of Transport; Announced 26 April 2023; Assumed office 1 May 2023 | President of the ANI; William Camargo of Boyacá |
| Minister of Culture; Announced 2 August 2023 Assumed office 13 August 2023 | Literary man, writer, journalist and editor Juan David Correa of Bogotá, D.C. | Minister of Sports; Announced 27 February 2023Assumed office 27 February 2023 | Degree in Physical Education; Astrid Rodríguez of Bogotá, D.C. |
| Minister of Science, Technology and Innovation; Announced 26 April 2023; Assumed office 1 May 2023 | Academic and Anthropologist; Yesenia Olaya of Nariño | Minister of Equality and Equity; Announced 7 August 2022; Assumed office 1 July 2023 | Environmental activist Francia Márquez of Cauca |
=== Cabinet-level officials ===
| Office Date announced / confirmed | Designee | Office Date announced / confirmed | Designee |
| Chief of Staff of the Presidency; Announced 20 June 2022 Assumed office 7 August 2022 | Laura Sarabia of Bogotá, D.C. | Director of the DAPR; Announced 26 April 2023; Assumed office 1 May 2023 | Carlos Ramón González of Santander |
| Director of the DPN; Announced 20 July 2022; Assumed office 24 August 2022 | Jorge Iván González of Bogotá, D.C. | Director of the DAFP; Announced 20 July 2022; Assumed office 24 August 2022 | César Augusto Manrique of Bogotá, D.C. |
| Director of the DAPS; Announced 20 July 2022; Assumed office 24 August 2022 | Cielo Rusinque of Bogotá, D.C. | Director of the DNI; Announced 20 July 2022; Assumed office 24 August 2022 | Manuel Casanova of Bogotá, D.C. |
| Director of the DANE; Announced 20 July 2022; Assumed office 24 August 2022 | Piedad Urduola of Bogotá, D.C. | | |

== Nominated candidates for Cabinet positions ==
The following cabinet positions are listed in order of their creation (also used as the basis for the Colombian presidential line of succession).

=== Minister of the Interior ===
==== Alfonso Prada ====
He was presented on April 6, 2022, as head of the debate for the presidential candidate for the Historic Pact, Gustavo Petro. Later he would be announced on June 20, as Minister of the Interior, assuming office on August 7, 2022.

Minister of the Interior
| Portrait | Name | Date of birth | Background | Reference |
|---|---|---|---|---|
| | Alfonso Prada | June 10, 1963 (age 63) | Secretary General of the Presidency (2017-2018); Director of SENA (2014-2017); Member of Chamber of Representatives (2010-2014); Councilor of Bogotá (1998-2006) | |

==== Luis Fernando Velasco ====
Among the changes made in the cabinet, Velasco was announced as the replacement of Alfonso Prada as Minister of the Interior on April 26, 2023, in an official press release.

Minister of the Interior
| Portrait | Name | Date of birth | Background | Reference |
|---|---|---|---|---|
| | Luis Fernando Velasco | October 18, 1964 (age 61) | Counselor for the Regions of the Presidency (2022-2023); President of the Senate (2015-2016); Senator of Colombia (2006-2022); Member of the Chamber of Representatives (1998-2006) | |

==== Juan Fernando Cristo ====
On July 3, 2024, Petro carried out his fourth change in the administration, announcing Juan Fernando Cristo as the new Minister of the Interior.

Minister of the Interior
| Portrait | Name | Date of birth | Background | Reference |
|---|---|---|---|---|
| | Juan Fernando Cristo | July 11, 1964 (age 62) | Minister of the Interior (2014-2017); President of the Senate (2013-2014); Senator of Colombia (1998-2014) | |

=== Minister of Foreign Affairs ===
==== Álvaro Leyva ====
On July 25, 2022, Álvaro Leyva was announced as the new Minister of Foreign Affairs, who had previously served as a peace negotiator with insurgent groups.

Minister of Foreign Affairs
| Portrait | Name | Date of birth | Background | Reference |
|---|---|---|---|---|
| | Álvaro Leyva | August 26, 1942 (age 83) | Member of the Constituent Assembly (1991); Minister of Mines and Energy (1984-1985); Senator of Colombia (1982-1984) (1985-1990); Member of the Chamber of Representatives (1978-1982); Deputy of the Assembly of Cundinamarca (1976-1978); Councilor of Bogotá (1974-1976); Private Secretary of the Presidency (1970-1974) | |

==== Luis Gilberto Murillo ====
In January 2024 due to a three-month suspension imposed by the Supreme Court of Justice on the Álvaro Leyva as Minister of Foreign Affairs, Murillo would serve as Acting Minister of Foreign Affairs.

Minister of Foreign Affairs
| Portrait | Name | Date of birth | Background | Reference |
|---|---|---|---|---|
| | Luis Gilberto Murillo | January 1, 1967 (age 59) | Colombian Ambassador to the United States (2022-2024); Minister of Environment and Sustainable Development (2016-2018); Governor of Chocó (1998-199) | |

==== Laura Sarabia ====
On January 21, 2025, Laura Sarabia was announced as the new Minister of Foreign Affairs.

Minister of Foreign Affairs
| Portrait | Name | Date of birth | Background | Reference |
|---|---|---|---|---|
| | Laura Sarabia | March 20, 1994 (age 32) | General Director of DAPRE (2024-2025); General Director of Social Prosperity (2023-2024); Chief of Staff of the Presidency (2022-2023) | |

=== Minister of Finance and Public Credit ===
==== José Antonio Ocampo ====
On July 25, 2022, the President-elect appointed several of his future Ministers, including José Antonio Ocampo, who had already served as Minister of Finance and Public Credit, during the administration of Ernesto Samper.

Minister of Finance and Public Credit
| Portrait | Name | Date of birth | Background | Reference |
|---|---|---|---|---|
| | José Antonio Ocampo | December 20, 1952 (age 73) | Minister of Finance and Public Credit (1996-1997); United Nations Undersecretary-General for Economic and Social Affairs (2003-2007); United Nations Executive Secretary for the Economic Commission for Latin America and the Caribbean (1998-2003); Director of the National Planning Department (1994-1996); Minister of Agriculture and Rural Development (1993-1994) | |

==== Ricardo Bonilla ====
Among the changes made to the cabinet, Bonilla was announced as the replacement for José Antonio Ocampo as Minister of Finance and Public Credit on April 26, 2023, in an official press release.

Minister of Finance and Public Credit
| Portrait | Name | Date of birth | Background | Reference |
|---|---|---|---|---|
| | Ricardo Bonilla | February 21, 1950 (age 76) | President of the Territorial Development Financial Bank (2022-2023); Secretary of Finance of Bogotá (2012-2015) | |

==== Diego Guevara ====
Following the resignation of Ricardo Bonilla as Minister of Finance, Guevara was announced as his replacement, taking office on January 29, 2025.

Minister of Finance and Public Credit
| Portrait | Name | Date of birth | Background | Reference |
|---|---|---|---|---|
| | Diego Guevara | October 16, 1985 (age 40) | Vice Minister General of Finance and Public Credit (2022-2024) | |

=== Minister of Agriculture and Rural Development ===
==== Cecilia López ====
On July 25, 2022, the President-elect appointed Cecilia López, who had already served as Minister of Agriculture and Rural Development, during the administration of Ernesto Samper.

Minister of Agriculture and Rural Development
| Portrait | Name | Date of birth | Background | Reference |
|---|---|---|---|---|
| | Cecilia López | April 18, 1943 (age 83) | Minister of Agriculture and Rural Development (1995-1997); Senator of Colombia (2006-2010); Director of FONADE (1997-1998); Minister of Environment (1995-1995) | |

==== Jhénifer Mojica ====
Minister of Agriculture and Rural Development
| Portrait | Name | Date of birth | Background | Reference |
|---|---|---|---|---|
| | Jhénifer Mojica | | Lawyer; Defensor of the Human Rights | |

=== Minister of Health and Social Protection ===
==== Carolina Corcho ====
Minister of Health and Social Protection
| Portrait | Name | Date of birth | Background | Reference |
|---|---|---|---|---|
| | Carolina Corcho | April 13, 1983 (age 43) | Doctor; Psychiatrist; Political scientist; Professor | |

==== Guillermo Jaramillo ====
Minister of Health and Social Protection
| Portrait | Name | Date of birth | Background | Reference |
|---|---|---|---|---|
| | Guillermo Jaramillo | June 25, 1950 (age 76) | Mayor of Ibagué (2016-2020); Secretary of Government of Bogotá (2013-2014); Secretary of Health of Bogotá (2012-2013); Senator of Colombia (2009-2010); Governor of Tolima (1986-1985) (2001-2004); Member of the Chamber of Representatives (1982-1986) | |

=== Minister of Information Technologies and Communications ===
==== Sandra Urrutia ====
Minister of Information Technologies and Communications
| Portrait | Name | Date of birth | Background | Reference |
|---|---|---|---|---|
| | Sandra Urrutia | September 20, 1978; 47) | Specializing in Telecommunications | |

==== Mauricio Lizcano ====
Minister of Information Technologies and Communications
| Portrait | Name | Date of birth | Background | Reference |
|---|---|---|---|---|
| | Mauricio Lizcano | August 12, 1976 (age 49) | Director of the DAPR (2022-2023); President of the Senate (2016-2017); Senator of Colombia (2010-2018); Member of the Chamber of Representatives (2006-2010) | |

=== Minister of Transport ===
==== Guillermo Reyes ====
Minister of Transport
| Portrait | Name | Date of birth | Background | Reference |
|---|---|---|---|---|
| | Guillermo Reyes | October 26, 1965; 60 | Deputy Minister of Justice (2006-2010); President of the National Electoral Council (2002-2006); Assistant Magistrate of the Constitutional Court (1992-2000) | |

==== William Camargo ====
Minister of Transport
| Portrait | Name | Date of birth | Background | Reference |
|---|---|---|---|---|
| | William Camargo | | President of the ANI (2022-2023); Director of the IDU (2013-2016) | |

=== Minister of Culture ===
==== Patricia Ariza ====
Minister of Culture
| Portrait | Name | Date of birth | Background | Reference |
|---|---|---|---|---|
| | Patricia Ariza | January 27, 1946 (age 80) | Plastic artist; Poet; Actress; Playwright | |

==== Jorge Ignacio Zorro ====
Minister of Culture
| Portrait | Name | Date of birth | Background | Reference |
|---|---|---|---|---|
| | Jorge Ignacio Zorro | February 27, 1946 (age 80) | Musician; Teacher; Conductor; Politician | |

== Nominated candidates for Cabinet-level positions ==
Cabinet-level officials hold positions that are considered cabinet-level but are not heads of executive departments. The exact positions that are considered Cabinet-level vary with each president. In 2019 it was raised to seven positions at the cabinet level with the creation of the Chief of Staff being the most important position at the cabinet level and the third most important at the Government level.

=== Chief of Staff ===
The Chief of Staff is traditionally the highest-ranking employee of the Casa de Nariño. The chief of staff's responsibilities are both management and advisory on the president's official affairs. The chief of staff is appointed by the President and serves at his discretion. The third member appointed to a cabinet or cabinet-level position announced by Petro was the chief of staff of the presidency, Laura Sarabia. She resigned in June 2023, being nominated Cielo Rusinque, who would later fail to take office.

Chief of Staff
| Portrait | Name | Date of birth | Years | Background | Reference |
|---|---|---|---|---|---|
| | Laura Sarabia | March 20, 1994 (age 32) | August 7, 2022 – June 2, 2023 | Political scientist | |

=== General Director of the DAPRE ===
It is the second most important position at the cabinet level, being the director of the agency in charge of the office of the President founded in 1956.

==== Mauricio Lizcano ====
- Taking office on August 7, 2022, he would later resign by May 2023 to take office as minister.

General Director of DAPRE
| Portrait | Name | Date of birth | Years | Background | Reference |
|---|---|---|---|---|---|
| | Mauricio Lizcano | August 12, 1976 (age 49) | August 7, 2022 – May 1, 2023 | President of the Senate (2016-2017); Senator of Colombia (2010-2018); Member of the Chamber of Representatives (2006-2010) | |

==== Carlos Ramón González ====
- Announced on May 1, 2023, and assumed office on April 26, 2022, and resigned on February 23, 2024, to take over as General Director of the DNI.

General Director of DAPRE
| Portrait | Name | Date of birth | Years | Background | Reference |
|---|---|---|---|---|---|
| | Carlos Ramón González | November 11, 1958 (age 67) | April 26, 2022 – February 23, 2024 | President of the Green Alliance (2019-2023); Councillor of Bucaramanga (1995-1998); Member of the Chamber of Representatives (1991-1994) | |

==== Laura Sarabia ====
- Announced on February 19, 2024, and assumed office on February 23, 2024.

General Director of DAPRE
| Portrait | Name | Date of birth | Years | Background | Reference |
|---|---|---|---|---|---|
| | Laura Sarabia | March 20, 1994 (age 32) | August 7, 2022 – June 2, 2023 | Political scientist | |

== See also ==
- Council of Ministers of Colombia
