= Presidency of Gustavo Petro =

Colombian presidencial administration from 2022 to 2026

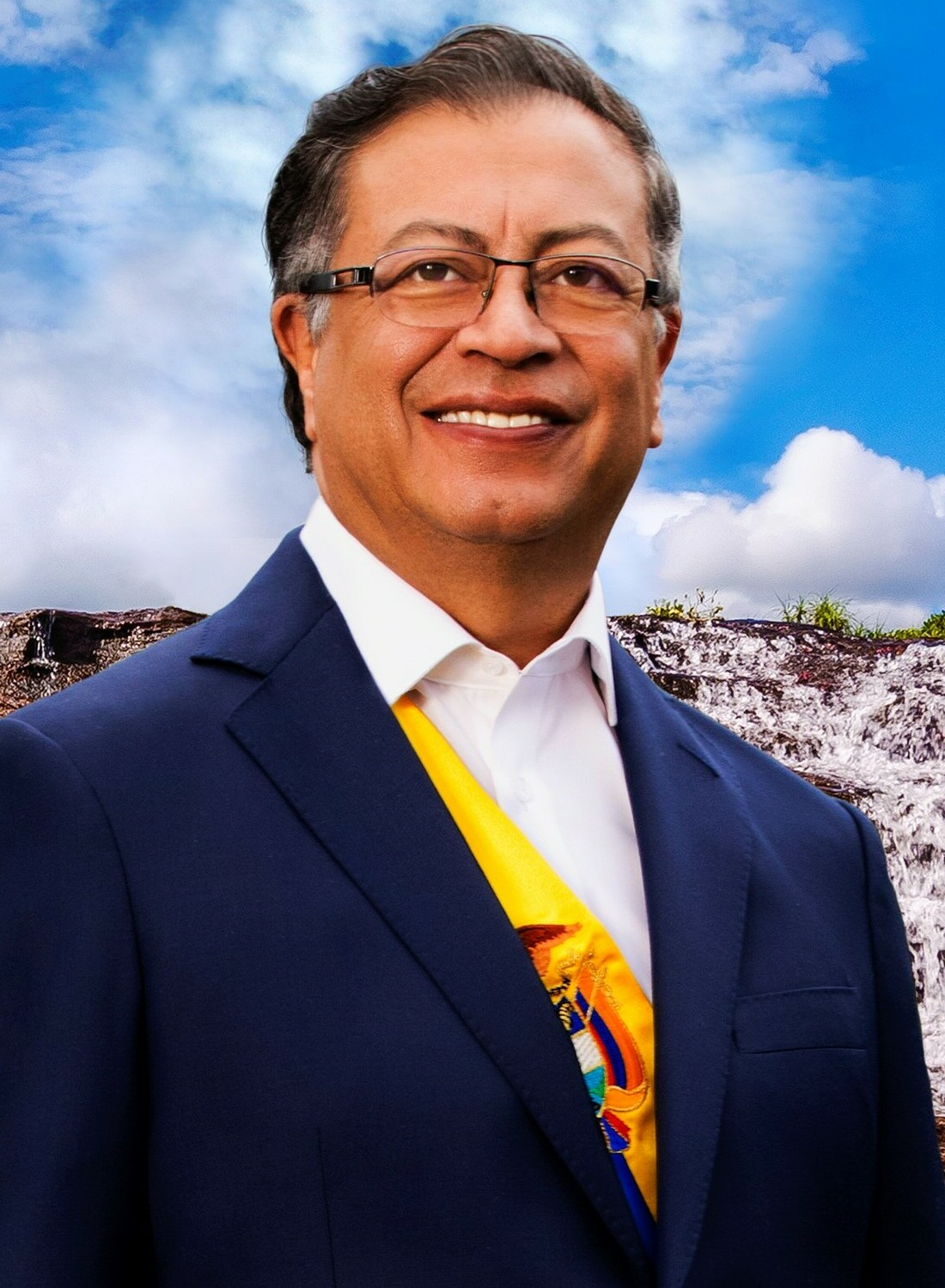
- Presidency of Gustavo Petro; 7 August 2022 – 7 August 2026
- Vice President: Francia Márquez
- Cabinet: Full list
- Party: Humane Colombia
- Election: 2022
- Seat: Casa de Nariño
- Seal of the president

Gustavo Petro's tenure as the 34th president of Colombia began with his inauguration on 7 August 2022. Petro, who previously served as mayor of Bogotá, took office after his victory in the 2022 presidential election over the anti-corruption leader Rodolfo Hernández. Petro took office under the political shadow of his predecessor, amid an economic crisis and increased political polarization.

At the time of his election, Petro was a 62-year-old member of Congress; his victory has been attributed to public anger at the political class over years of corruption in politics, economic recession, the COVID-19 health crisis and a rise in violent crime. The crisis the country was in was caused, among other factors, by the weakness of the prices of raw materials; the events revealed underlying weaknesses in the economy including poor infrastructure, excessive bureaucracy, an inefficient tax system, and corruption.

== 2022 election ==
Petro won the runoff with 50.42% of the vote to Hernández's 47.35%. Petro dominated in Bogotá and regions on Colombia's Caribbean and Pacific coasts, and received over 81% of the vote in the coastal department of Chocó. Due to an increased turnout among his supporters, Petro received nearly 2.7 million more votes in the second round than the first. The result was noted for a continuing trend of left-wing victories in Latin America, which has been dubbed as a "new pink tide".

== Administration and cabinet ==
The Petro Cabinet
Office	Name	Term
President	Gustavo Petro	2022–2026
Vice President	Francia Márquez	2022–2026
Interior	Alfonso Prada	2022–2023
Luis Fernando Velasco	2023–2026
Foreign Affairs	Álvaro Leyva	2022–2024
Luis Gilberto Murillo	2024–2025
Laura Sarabia	2025–2025
Rosa Yolanda Villavicencio	2025–2026
Finance	José Antonio Ocampo	2022–2023
Ricardo Bonilla	2023–2026
Justice	Néstor Osuna	2022–2026
Defense	Iván Velásquez	2022–2025
Pedro Arnulfo Sánchez	2025–2026
Agriculture	Cecilia López	2022–2023
Jhenifer Mojica	2023–2026
Health	Carolina Corcho	2022–2023
Guillermo Jaramillo	2023–2026
Labour	Gloria Inés Ramírez	2022–2026
Energy	Irene Vélez	2022–2023
Andrés Camacho	2023–2026
Commerce	Germán Umaña	2022–2026
Education	Alejandro Gaviria	2022–2023
Aurora Vergara	2023–2026
Environment	Susana Muhamad	2022–2026
Housing	Catalina Velasco	2022–2026
Telecommunications	Sandra Urrutia	2022–2023
Mauricio Lizcano	2023–
Transport	Guillermo Reyes	2022–2023
William Camargo	2023–2026
Culture	Patricia Ariza	2022–2023
Jorge Zorro	2023–2026
Sports	María Isabel Urrutia	2022–2023
Astrid Rodriguéz	2023–2026
Science, Technology, and Innovation	Arturo Luis Luna	2022–2023
Yesenia Olaya	2023–2026

Petro was inaugurated alongside Francia Márquez, the second woman and first Afro-Colombian vice president.

On 8 August 2022, after taking office as President of Colombia, Petro announced his pick of José Antonio Ocampo for Minister of Finance and Public Credit, previously holding the same position in Ernesto Samper's cabinet.

In April 2023, Petro asked for the resignation of his whole ministerial cabinet to proceed with its restructuring. By June 2023, he had dismissed his Chief of Staff and the ambassador to Venezuela in response to a scandal regarding illegal wiretapping and possible financing irregularities.

== Domestic policy ==
=== Taxes ===
After the failure of the Duque administration's tax reform, the Petro government aimed to create a system where the population with the least economic accessibility would be affected the least. His government has emphasized the importance of reducing taxes for low-income residents and raising them for those with higher incomes.

=== Energy ===
On 8 September, the Minister of Mines and Energy, Irene Veléz, held a meeting with various unions, mayors, and other stakeholders to discuss a path to stabilizing rising energy costs.

The minister insisted that there is another Colombia that has different yet just as difficult challenges: "It is about the more than five hundred thousand families that still do not have access to energy at the national level."

On 28 October, during his visit to the municipality of Bosconia, César Petro declared a state of National Emergency to allocate the economic resources that remained from the year's budget to face emergencies. "César lives a paradox that focuses on the climate crisis. I said it in my electoral campaign; here you suffer, but this region also produces the chemicals that generate this pollution: coal".

=== Environment and climate ===
On 7 November 2022, Petro traveled to Egypt with a delegation of 201 people to discuss and rethink solutions for climate change, one of his main banners was saving the Amazon and protecting water, Petro fired at everyone, including technocrats, in a veiled reference to his predecessor, Iván Duque, who was also at the climate summit promoting one of his books. From the summit, he wanted a common fund with other countries such as Brazil, Peru, Venezuela or the United States to protect the Amazon. Colombia, he announced, will allocate 140 million dollars a year for the next 20 years.

For Andrés Santiago Arroyave, an expert on environmental issues, what the president is asking for, beyond what is said in the decalogue, is that the necessary changes be accelerated to achieve the goals of reducing between 30% and 40% of the greenhouse gas emissions by 2030 and achieve carbon neutrality (countries generating the amount of greenhouse gases they can offset) by 2050.

However, he says that something that can generate resistance is that Petro speaks in terms of changes that must take place now, and is taking away the strength of the transition. "From an environmental perspective, the president's timing is correct; There is no longer a deadline to make less immediate changes. But if you look at it in the context of an economic crisis, recession and war, it's different", says Arroyave.

He thinks that it is very difficult for Colombia to give up the generation of fossil fuels in the short term, it is very complex because it is the main economic support of the country. "As tight as the schedule is to stop the advance of climate change, making an abrupt change in this area is something that the economy does not allow. What we can gain, from Colombia, with the insistence on the urgency of the Petro changes is that Ecopetrol increase efforts for the transition, which is something in which this country has a lot of potential. There is a lot of room to grow in wind power and solar power production," he says.

On 20 January 2023, he traveled to Davos, Switzerland to participate in the World Economic Forum, where at the end of his speech at the Petro he spoke about the intentions of the national government to lead an energy transition that allows the development of other industries, like tourism. In fact, during his presidential campaign he has insisted on the need for this sector to have significant economic empowerment, but for this a pacification plan is needed in the country.

From there arose the proposal to implement Total Peace, now understood as a State policy. The president stated that one of the steps to take is to invest in the tourism sector, "we are convinced that, with a strong investment in tourism, given the beauty of the country, and the capacity and potential that the country has in generating clean energy, could perfectly, in a short term, in a transition, fill the gaps that the fossil economy can leave", said the Head of State when closing his speech at the Davos Forum.

=== Biodiversity ===
As Colombia is a biodiversity hotspot, the administration planned to "carry out fundamental transformations to face the emergency caused by climate change and the loss of biodiversity". In a speech to the UN, Petro connected the "irrational war on drugs" to the destruction of the rainforest ecosystems, as the eradication of the coca plant through glyphosate or fire causes harm to many other nearby plants and poisons the water in the former case. On 10 January 2023, the National Police of Colombia reduced their target coca eradication goal by 60% for 2023.

In March 2023, Colombia and Bolivia announced a joint petition to remove the coca plant, but not cocaine, from the Single Convention on Narcotic Drugs, a list of narcotic substances deemed illegal, at the 66th Session of the Commission on Narcotic Drugs in Vienna. In their contribution to the debate Laura Gil Savastano referred to the inclusion of the coca plant in the convention as a historic mistake.

=== Education ===
On 17 November 2022 during an intervention in Pinillos, Bolívar Petro announced changes in the education sector focusing on secondary school, Petro assured that the country's education system has to make a transition to the model that is managed on the European continent.

The president concluded the announcement by saying that the ideal would be for this model to be implemented in the Los Pinillos school, "to ensure that the best public education in Colombia can be established in the region that had one of the best educations in the times of the origin of the Republic of Colombia".

=== Defense ===
On 17 December, President Gustavo Petro commented to various media outlets that the National Government is contemplating the idea of renewing the fleet of combat aircraft of the Colombian Air Force. According to the president, the announcement corresponds to the renewal of the Kfir aircraft fleet, of Israeli origin and that by next year they would be obsolete, because they have been in operation for more than 30 years, the president quoted in verbatim words. I believe that the wives of the current pilots are going to thank me very much, because in reality it was already dangerous to climb on those devices", said Gustavo Petro in the middle of the promotion ceremony for officers of the Military Forces.

Later the Minister of Defense argued in exact words "it is a reality that these planes must be bought and the French planes are the leading proposal. The Dassault Rafale could arrive in 2025 and the old ones would stop leaving service next year, said Velásquez and stated that this decision had been considered for 12 years.

=== Total peace ===
Already during his campaign for president, Gustavo Petro introduced his ideas for a Total Peace in Colombia, which aims for an all encompassing and lasting peace in Colombia, using a two-pronged strategy of reducing social inequality and expanding upon the policy of peacemeal negotiations with armed groups of his predecessors. This set of policies included a renewal of peace talks with the remaining left- and right-wing armed groups to the Colombian conflict, particularly the ELN, as well as plea-bargaining benefits to paramilitary successor groups, like the AGC and FARC dissidents. On 4 November 2022, Petro signed into law a total peace bill, codifying negotiation conditions with armed groups. Peace talks with the ELN were finally resumed at the end of November 2022, with the first set of meetings taking place in Venezuela, after the restoration of diplomatic contacts between the two countries. In addition to these attempts at peace with armed groups, exploratory talks with violent gangs, like the Shottas and Espartanos were held with government officials that could demobilise up to 2000 gang members. The preliminary truce had already accomplished to prevent any gang-related homicides in Buenaventura in over 100 days. On 1 January 2023, the government obtained a ceasefire agreement with the 5 largest armed groups still operating in Colombia, supposed to be lasting for 6 months. The ELN for its part stated on 3 January 2023 that a mutual ceasefire is only a proposal that needs to be discussed further at an upcoming meeting at the end of January in Mexico, leading to a suspension of the ceasefire from Colombian authorities until such an agreement is reached. In the beginning of March 2023, the government announced that talks with the FARC splinter groups were also in its incipient stages, after 19 arrest warrants against the guerrilla were revoked to negotiate a peace deal and the FARC dissidents released 11 captives via mediation of the Catholic Church and the International Committee of the Red Cross. On 2 May, the Colombian government and the ELN met for a third round of talks in Havana, where both sides indicated their openness to a thorough ceasefire agreement, after a clash between the army and the ELN in late March left nine Colombian soldiers dead, threatening to derail the peace process. At the beginning of June a major breakthrough in the negotiations between the government and the ELN occurred, leading to a six-month long ceasefire between the two parties, starting from 3 August 2023. The signing ceremony took place on 9 June in Havana, in the presence of Gustavo Petro, the ELN commander Antonio García and the Cuban president Miguel Díaz-Canel. Concomitantly on 2 June, several urban gang leaders, who are currently imprisoned in high-security prisons, announced their readiness to further dialogue with the government negotiation team. A currently proposed law outlines a peace formula for these armed gangs, which provides reparations to victims in exchange for reduced prison sentences for those confessing to crimes and enables gangs to retain 6%, with a cap at $2.7m, of their ill-gotten gains.

Aside from these negotiations, the government wants to embark on multiple paths reducing the large social inequality in the country, among them a land redistribution plan and investments in rural infrastructure, benefitting poor rural communities. Further the government signalled its intent in investing in education for peace, tolerance and reconciliation.

In 2025, it was reported that less than 20% of the population believed "Total Peace" was successful, with over 70% stating it was "off-course."

=== National Development Plan ===
On 6 February 2023, Petro announced the details of his four-year development law package, which would invest $247 billion to reduce the percentage of the population living in extreme poverty, redistribute surpluses from fossile energy sources to the renewable energy transition, and institute a land reform to increase the agricultural output, covering nearly 3 million hectares of land to be allotted to poor farmers, if passed.

=== Health ===
One of his main flags, during his 2022 political campaign, was the importance of restructuring the health sector, one of the areas that affects the most Colombians, on 23 February 2023, the Minister of Health, Carolina Corcho, in which established a series of changes and the role of the EPS as well as the rest of the companies that facilitate Health.

Weeks later, the presidents of the parties, Conservative, Liberal and U, Petro's government parties, carried out analyzes of the reform as well as their contributions.

At the end of May the reform passed the lower chamber with the governing majority and some opposition lawmakers voting in favour. Its passage was opposed by many industry lobbying groups, like the National Association of Industrialists (ANDI) and some former Ministers of Health.

In January 2023, on the occaion of the 7th CELAC summit, the foundation of a regional medicine agency, termed Agencia Reguladora de Medicamentos y Dispositivos Médicos de Latinoamérica y el Caribe (AMLAC), was announced to the public. The agency was eventually founded on 27 April 2023, by delegates of Colombia, Mexico and Cuba with 10 other states signalling their intent to join the agency later on. The agency is supposed increase the self-suffiency of the participating states, streamline trade with medicinal products among the countries and harmonise regulations.

=== Labor ===
On 17 March 2023, the administration of Gustavo Petro filed, the labor reform, which would bring higher night and Sunday surcharges for workers, while it will seek that they be linked through indefinite-term contracts and that companies will be more hard to fire

“The centrality of the reform is job stability. It will guarantee the rights of the nearly 22 million employed persons. We have a text that will allow us to move towards a society that recognizes the importance of labor rights", assured the Minister of Labor, Gloria Inés Ramírez.

The bill, which will have to go through Congress, proposes that Colombians have a 42 hour work week that can be distributed, by mutual agreement, between employer and worker, throughout 5 or 6 days a week. Currently, there is a 48 hour work week, with it scheduled to be lowered to 47 hours in July 2025 in accordance with a 2021 law from the Duque administration which planned to gradually reduce working hours from 48 to 42 between 2023 2026.

In addition, the night shift would not start at 9 at night, but at 6 in the afternoon, and work on Sundays or holidays would now be paid with a surcharge of 100 percent, compared to the current 75 percent.

=== Cannabis legalization ===
Mirroring the trend towards legalisation of the cannabis plant in other countries, legislation concerning a legalised and regulated market for cannabis products passed a first hurdle in the Senate in early June 2023 after passing the Chamber of Representatives in early May. Senator María José Pizarro cited reduced crime, health benefits to consumers and approximately $400m in tax revenue as major motivations for the new law. The legislation is opposed by the conservative parties Democratic Center and Conservative Party, who specified health risks and moral reasons for their opposition.

== Foreign policy ==
=== United Nations ===
On 20 September, Petro addressed himself in his speech before the United Nations General Assembly. Contrary to his two predecessors, Iván Duque and Juan Manuel Santos, the speech was mainly in Spanish. It is expected that around 9:30 am, the Colombian president will begin his speech at the lectern of the UN headquarters, Petro raised the need to create a large common fund to save the Amazon. According to Petro, around US$1,000 million must be contributed worldwide for 20 years to work for the recovery of one of the largest forests in the world. This fund would be managed, according to the Colombian president, through the United Nations, which maintained his position on the war on drugs.

In his speech he said that:

“to destroy the coca plant they throw poisons, glyphosate en masse that runs through the waters, they arrest their growers and imprison them. For destroying or possessing the coca leaf, a million Latin Americans are murdered and two million Afro-Americans are imprisoned in North America. Destroy the plant that kills, they cry from the north, but the plant is just one more plant among the millions that perish when they unleash fire on the jungle.”

— Gustavo Petro, Speech to the United Nations.

pointed to the rich countries and the functioning of contemporary society to be destroying the jungle with their addictions to drugs and consumption. "Which is more poisonous to humanity, cocaine, coal or oil?" she asked.

=== Americas ===
==== Brazil ====
During his presidency, Gustavo Petro has maintained a stable relationship with President of Brazil Luiz Inácio Lula da Silva; he has held two bilateral meetings, one of the most important of his administration being the 2023 Amazon Summit that took place on 8 and 9 August and which With the presence of the nine countries that share the Amazon, this summit presented the starting point for the creation of a new agenda for the Amazon Biome based on science, ancestral knowledge, social inclusion and the participation of all stakeholders. that will contribute to the design and implementation of innovative public protection policies for this important ecosystem.

==== Guatemala ====
On 17 January 2023, the Guatemalan prosecutor's office ordered the capture of Iván Velásquez, Minister of Defense who had previously served as Head of the International Commission against Impunity in Guatemala, and who allegedly carried out and disclosed information on investigations against corruption carried out at various Central Americans presidents.

Petro assured that they will defend Iván Velásquez, Minister of Defense, in light of the accusations made against him by the Public Ministry of Guatemala. He warned that the actions taken could jeopardize diplomatic relations between the two countries.

Velásquez served in that country as head of the International Commission against Impunity in Guatemala until the beginning of 2019 when he was expelled by President Jimmy Morales, along with other investigators. During his tenure, more than 70 criminal structures were dismantled and more than 600 prosecuted. The most prominent was the one known as La Línea, whose investigation led President Otto Pérez Molina and Vice President Roxana Baldetti to prison.

According to President Petro, it was these investigations that are now persecuting the current Minister of National Defense. Like any person who fights against corruption, who takes a vanguard role, and Iván Velásquez did so when he was appointed to the United Nations independent judicial commission to destroy the impunity that dominated, and still dominates, the Republic of Guatemala. because now he is persecuted by that type of interest that touched, said the Colombian president.

Petro pointed out that, contrary to what the Public Ministry now affirms, Iván Velásquez caused a rupture of the powerful and corrupt interests of that country to "discover ways of greater transparency, where they can truly be the owners of power and not the criminals.

==== Nicaragua ====
In April 2022, the ICJ issued a ruling that declared in its title that Colombia violated the sovereign rights of Nicaragua. The ruling demanded that Colombia "immediately cease" fishing activities in Nicaraguan territory, something that the government of Daniel Ortega celebrated.

Nicaragua asserts that from its coasts there is an uninterrupted natural prolongation of the continent that extends beyond its 200 nautical miles. It argues that this gives it the right to increase its platform, despite the fact that it overlaps with the 200 nautical miles that correspond to Colombia from its continental coasts. At the center of the claim are gas and oil from the seafloor. Colombia alleges that it has never ratified the United Nations Convention on the Law of the Sea, which recognizes continental shelves. Nicaragua responds that their claims are also recognized in customary law, based on legal customs of the States that are accepted as binding. However, Colombia asserts that this is not true, since customary law refers to general principles and not to the technicalities of the delimitation of territories.

Days later, the Government of Colombia, through a statement made by the Minister of Foreign Affairs, Álvaro Leyva, responded "We were programming the sending of the Colombian ambassador to Managua, but I understand that they are not liking the last position". He assured that Colombia's position has always been to ensure human rights, "That's why we wanted to go there, so that it could get on the wagon of the new politics and geopolitics that is being designed in the American continent." Meanwhile, the foreign minister in the conversation spoke about an end to the relationship with Nicaragua, "for now, it seems that they are suspended."

On 28 September 2022, Colombia's ambassador to the Organization of American States, Luis Ernesto Vargas, declared that he would condemn human rights violations in Nicaragua when necessary, but that he would prioritize the integration of the countries in the region.

==== United States ====
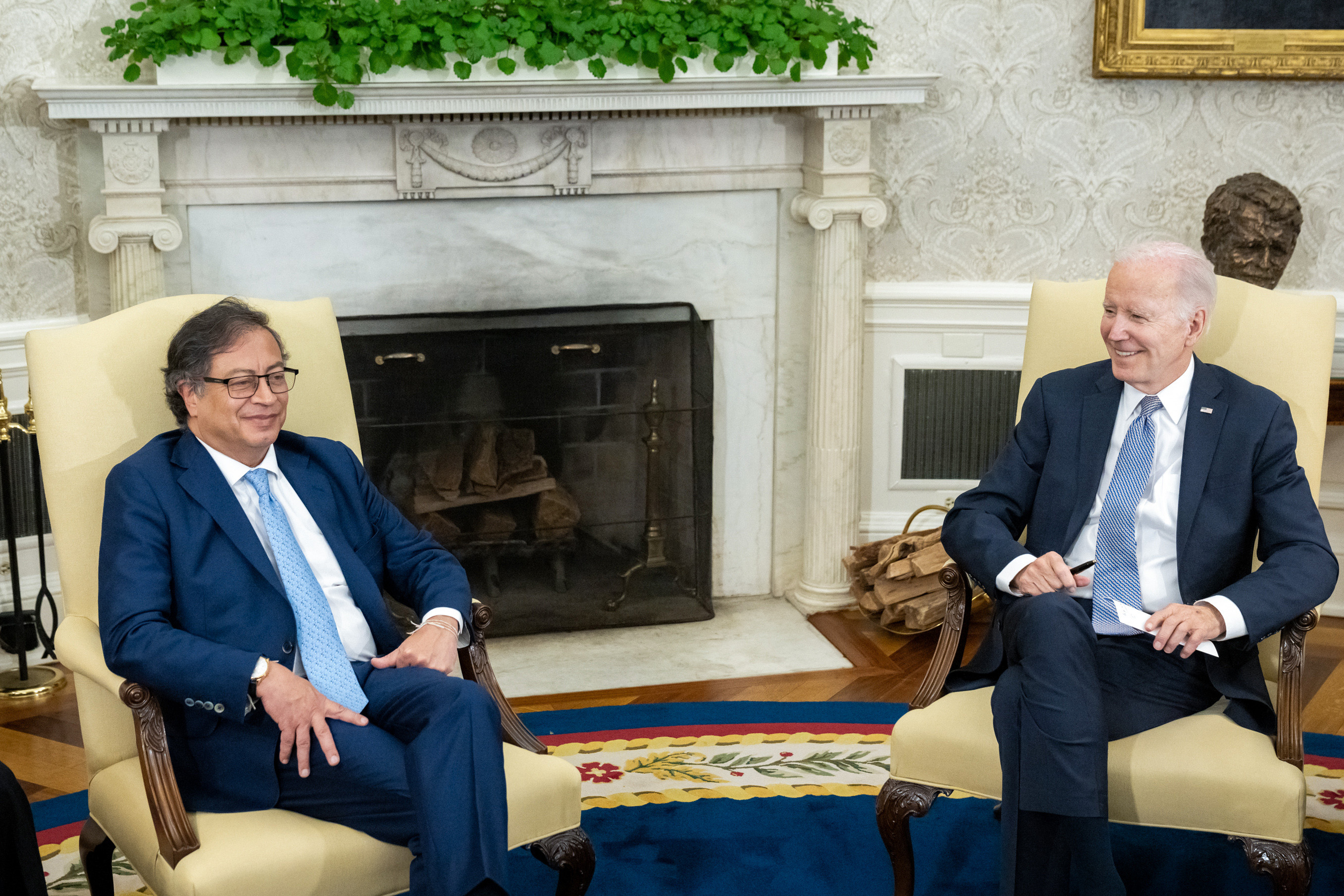
President Biden and President Petro of Colombia at the White House.

On 20 April 2023, he met with the president of the United States, Joe Biden, at the White House, where topics such as decarbonization, the construction of a green economy in America, and electrical transmission at the continental level were discussed. payment of foreign debt through actions against climate change.

Among the conclusions, the United States promised an investment of US$500 million for the Amazon Fund, as part of the efforts of the two nations to face climate change. With this contribution, the United States would be one of the largest donors to this international conservation program, which was established during the previous term of President Luiz Inácio Lula da Silva to protect the Amazon rainforest from deforestation.

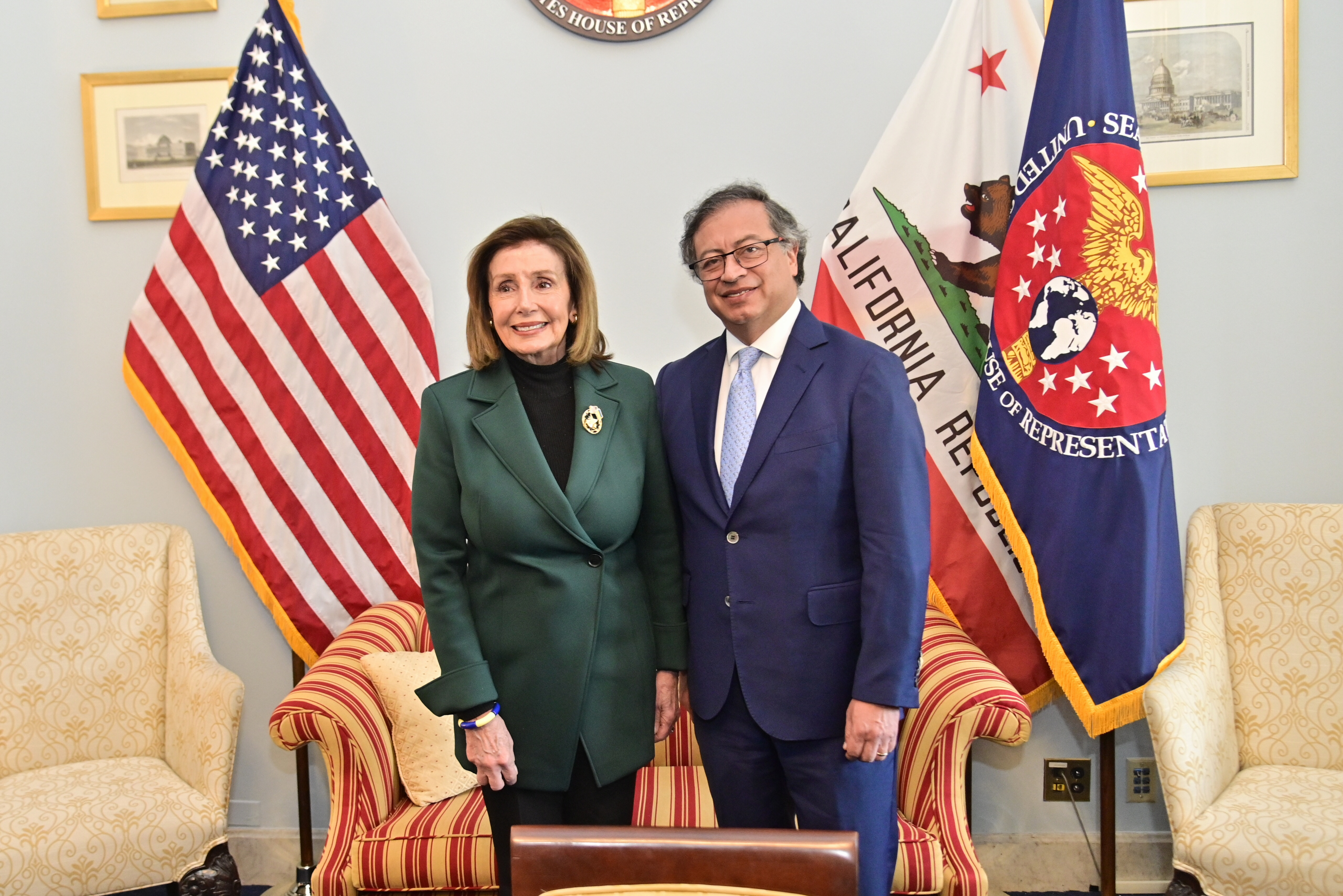
Gustavo Petro with Nancy Pelosi.

Later he had a meeting with the former Speaker of the United States House of Representatives, Nancy Pelosi, where he reiterated the need for United States support for the agrarian reform proposed by the administration.

==== Venezuela ====
As of 2019, before assuming the presidency, Petro had an ambiguous position on Venezuela under Hugo Chávez and Nicolás Maduro. While he has not denounced its human rights violations or described Maduro as a dictator, unlike Iván Duque, he also has not expressed unrestricted support, unlike Evo Morales.

Petro had met Chávez in 1994, on Seventh Street in Bogotá, after inviting the latter to come to Colombia to learn more about the new Political Constitution of 1991. At the Bridge of Boyacá, both "swore an oath of Bolivarian integration for Latin America". After Chávez's death in 2013, Petro affirmed that he was a "great Latin American leader", saying: "You lived in Chávez's times and maybe you thought he was a clown. You were fooled. You lived in the times of a great Latin American leader". He also expressed: "Even if many do not like him, Hugo Chávez will be a man who will be remembered by the history of Latin America, his critics will be forgotten", "a friend and a hope is gone".

In 2016, Petro ironized about the crisis in Venezuela, in a year when shortages and malnutrition were rampant, by posting a photo of a supermarket with full shelves on Twitter and saying, "I went into a supermarket in Caracas and look what I found. Did RCN fool me?". In a 2018 interview in Al Punto, Mexican journalist Jorge Ramos asked Petro if he considered Chávez as a political leader, to which Petro answered that he believed that "he was popularly elected", but that authoritarianism in Venezuela under Maduro was putting an end to all freedoms.

In 2019, Petro criticized the idea of an American military intervention against Maduro's regime, stating that "only Venezuelans should solve Venezuela's problems", that "it's not a coup d'état backed by foreigners that will bring democracy to Venezuela", and that "what is happening in Venezuela is a frontal struggle for the control of oil". In 2020, Petro claimed that if Colombia reestablished diplomatic relations, cut off by Maduro, and sold food to Venezuela, Venezuelan immigration would cease.

In response to Maduro's attack of him and president of Chile Gabriel Boric as well as president of Peru Pedro Castillo, describing them as a "cowardly left wing" attacking the Bolivarian Revolution in February 2022, Petro responded on social media saying "I suggest Maduro to stop his insults. Cowards are those who do not embrace democracy", adding, "Get Venezuela out of oil, take it to the deepest democracy, if you must step aside, do it".

Following the results of the second round of the 2022 presidential elections in Colombia, Maduro congratulated Petro on his victory, saying "I congratulate Gustavo Petro and Francia Márquez, for the historic victory in the presidential elections in Colombia. The will of the Colombian people was heard, who came out to defend the path of democracy and peace. New times are on the horizon for this brother country".

On 26 August 2022, Petro asks his ambassador in Venezuela to establish ties with the neighboring country. The call was made during the act of possession.

"Ambassador, go and see how Colombia's house is, over there," Petro said. "There are 16 consulates that have to be filled, we have talked about people with diplomatic careers, all of them, the 16. We have to repair the damage to the houses and the damage to the hearts. The first one. So that no one ever thinks of entering Venezuela and Colombia there has to be a conflict, a war or something like that"

— Gustavo Petro, Reopening of relations with Venezuela Likewise, the president assured that the rupture of binational ties in the past was a huge mistake that caused the violation of human rights, especially of the border population.

"Today I take office before President Petro Gustavo as Colombian ambassador to Venezuela. We will work to normalize relations between two sister countries. Trade, border security and fraternal ties with our neighbor will be a priority," he commented on Twitter. Benedetti has assured that one of his first objectives as ambassador in Venezuela will be to promote commercial exchange between neighboring nations, which will especially benefit the inhabitants of the border.

In an August 2022 interview with the Colombian magazine Semana, Petro stated that he would only recognize Nicolás Maduro as Venezuelan president, and that the partially recognized interim president of Venezuela, Juan Guaidó, was a "non-existent" president, and that Guaidó had no control over the country. Guaidó reproached the lack of recognition of his interim government, and responded in a press conference: "I would have expected that his first decision would not have been to approach one who today shelters world terrorism in Venezuela".

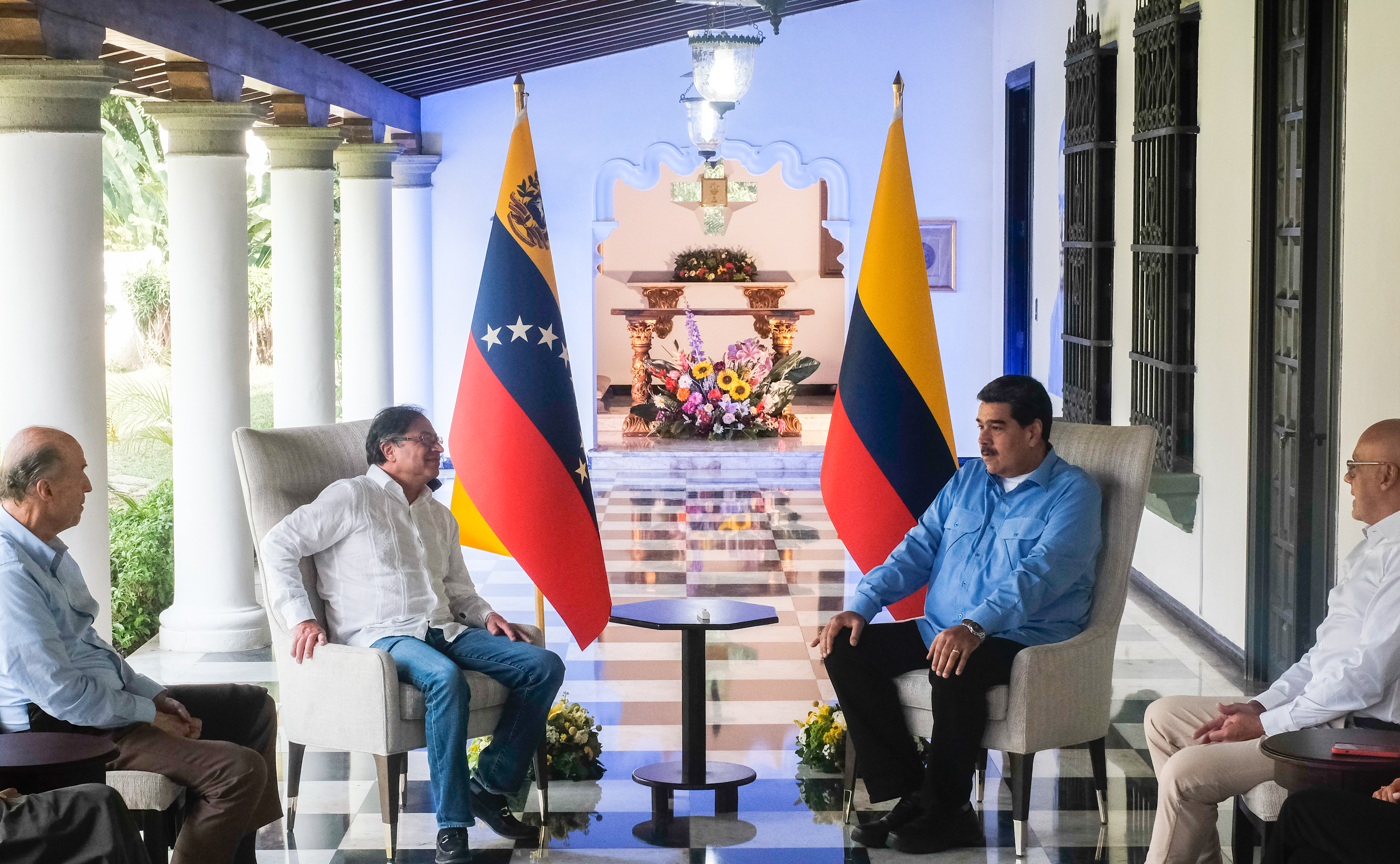
Petro and Venezuelan President Nicolás Maduro in Caracas, Venezuela, 23 March 2023

In October 2022, Petro claimed that the number of migrants returning to Venezuela at that time outnumbered those leaving the country, arguing that there were more Colombian migrants entering Venezuela than Venezuelans entering Colombia.

On 1 November 2022 the President of the Republic, Gustavo Petro, arrived in Caracas on an official visit to Venezuela, where he met with Nicolás Maduro. Petro arrived at the Maiquetía airport, where he was received by the Vice President of Venezuela, Delcy Rodríguez. He immediately went to Caracas and, upon arriving at the Miraflores Palace, seat of the Presidency, President Maduro was waiting for him at the main door. At the presidential headquarters, the Parada Group formed a street of honor to welcome the Colombian President. Next, the presidents reviewed the detachment and the Orchestra of the National System of Youth and Children's Orchestras and Choirs of Venezuela presented a cultural sample. The presidents will have a private meeting and later, in the Ayacucho room of the Miraflores Palace, a meeting of the delegations will be held, in which issues such as the opening of the border, trade, Latin American democracy and the entry of Venezuela will be addressed. to the Inter-American Human Rights System. The Colombian Head of State traveled accompanied by the Chief of Staff, Laura Sarabia, the Minister of Foreign Relations, Álvaro Leyva the Ambassador of Colombia in Venezuela, Armando Benedetti the Ambassador of Venezuela in Colombia, Félix Plasencia, and the Ambassador of Colombia to the Organization of American States, Luis Ernesto Vargas.

In February 2023, Gustavo Petro and Nicolás Maduro signed a bilateral trade agreement at the Tienditas International Bridge. The agreement concerns topics like tariffs as well as investment and trade conditions.

Petro announced that Colombia would host an international conference to discuss the crisis in Venezuela in 2023. On the eve of the conference, Guaidó was expelled from Colombia after entering the country. After initially considering deporting him back to Venezuela, Guaidó eventually traveled to the United States. The conference took place in April with 20 countries in attendance but without that of any Venezuelan representation. It concluded with very few results, although it came to three conclusions: the need for an electoral schedule to be established in Venezuela, that the agreements between chavismo and the opposition be accompanied by the lifting of sanctions, and that the resumption of the dialogue process in Mexico go in parallel with the creation of a fund for social investment in the country, as agreed in November 2023.

=== Asia ===
==== China ====
In October 2023, Petro visited China. During the visit, Colombia and China elevated their diplomatic relations to a strategic partnership and signed twelve cooperation agreements.

=== Europe ===
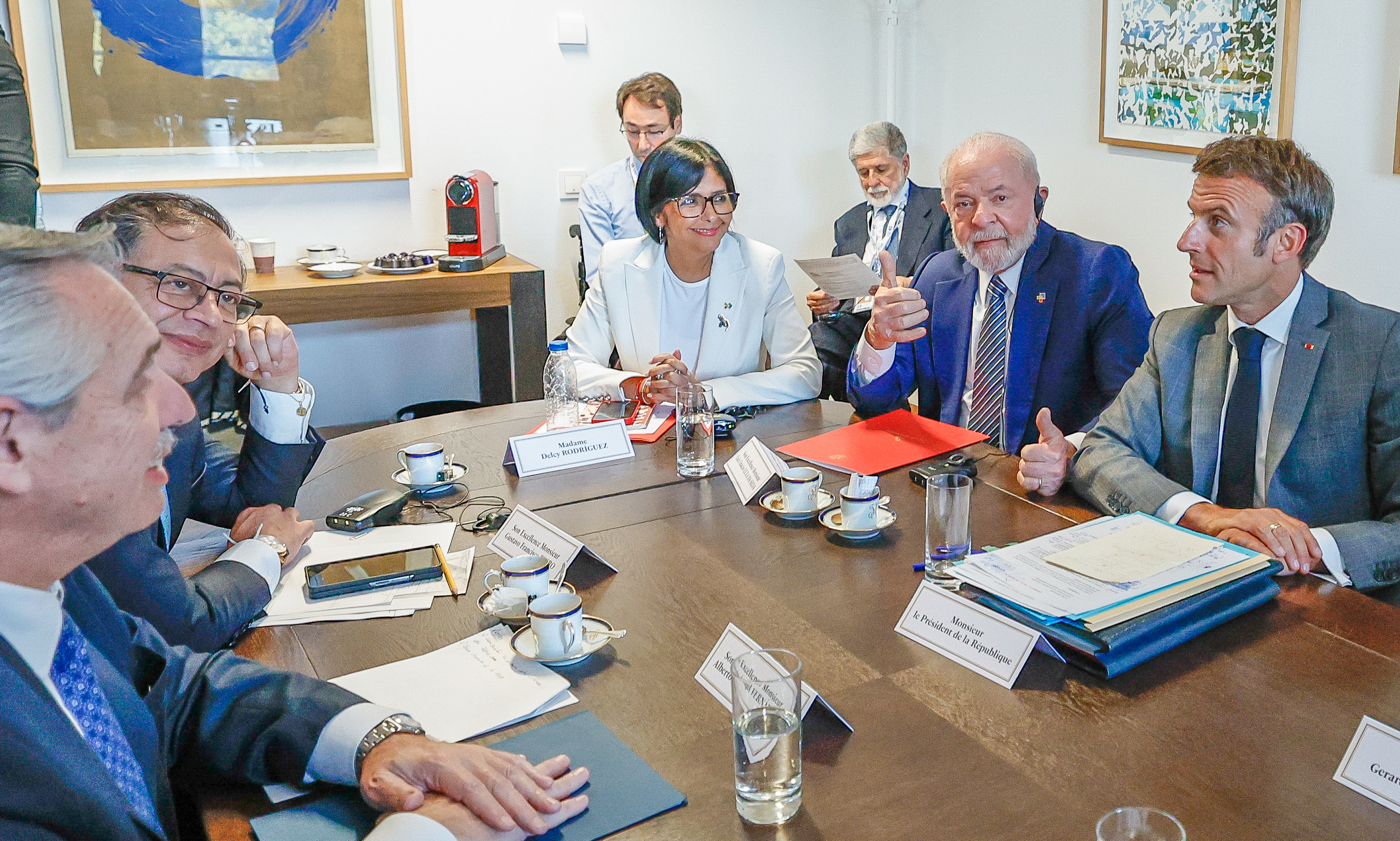
Petro at the 3rd EU–CELAC summit in Brussels, Belgium, 17 July 2023

==== France ====
On 22 June 2023, Gustavo Petro held a bilateral with the President of France, Emmanuel Macron. In this meeting, President Gustavo Petro reiterated his proposal that public debt should be exchanged for climate action. Already on the morning of this Thursday, the president presented this thesis before the Summit for a New World Financial Pact.

==== Germany ====
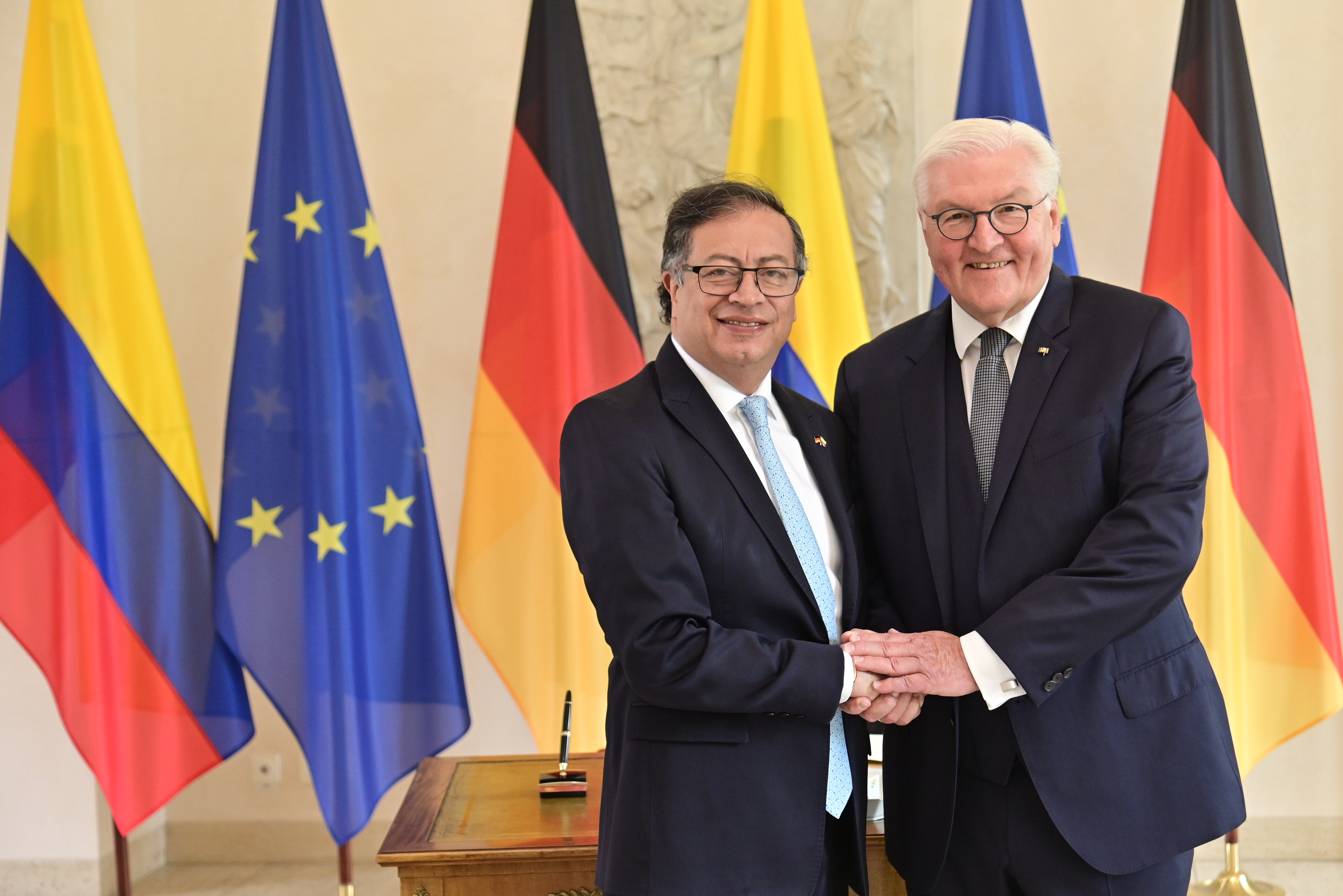
President Gustavo Petro with President of Germany Frank-Walter Steinmeier.

On 14 June 2023, President Petro arrived in Germany to hold a diplomatic meeting with the Federal President of Germany Frank-Walter Steinmeier, the German Chancellor Olaf Scholz members of the German Parliament, as well as a meeting with presidents of different gas production companies, energy, infrastructure, steel, telecommunications and other areas, among the topics to be discussed were the transition to clean energy, production and use of hydrogen in Colombia, technology and innovation.

==== Portugal ====
After his state visit to Spain, Petro arrived in Portugal, to meet with Antonio Costa, Prime Minister of Portugal and later with Marcelo Rebelo de Sousa, President of Portugal, this to strengthen the bilateral relationship and the ties of friendship and cooperation between the two countries.

==== Spain ====
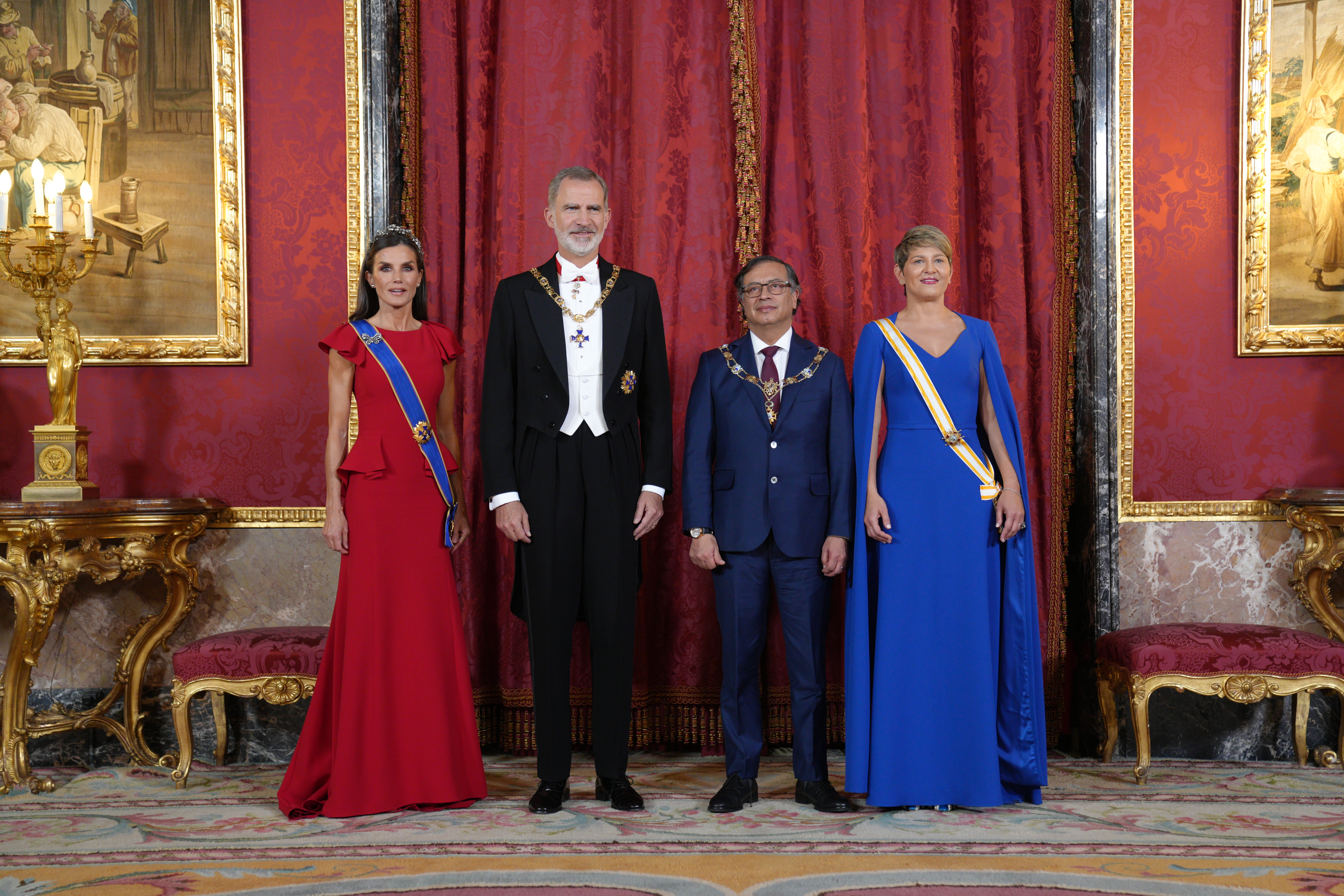
President Petro, First lady Verónica Alcocer with The King and Queen of Spain.

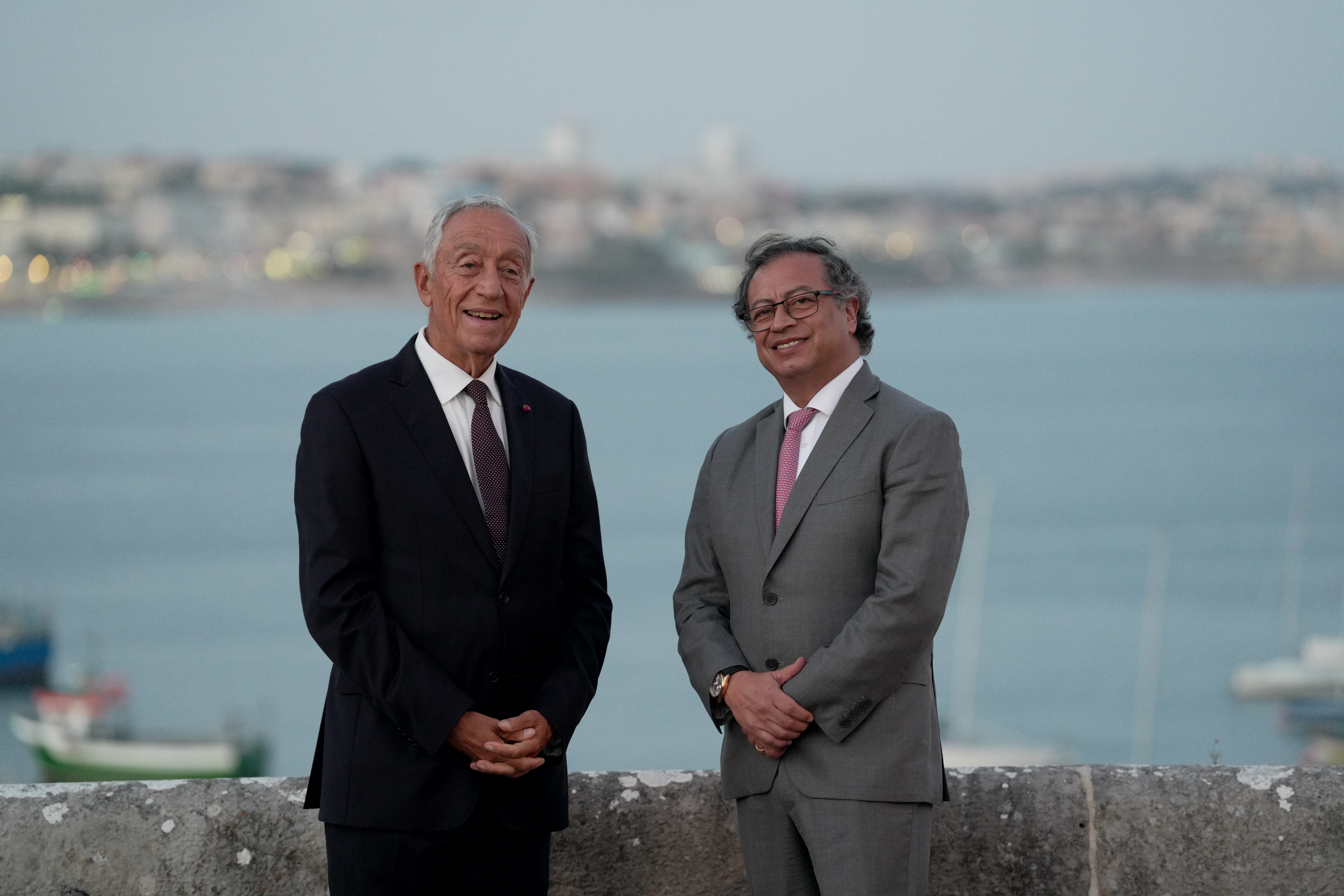
Gustavo Petro with Marcelo Rebelo de Sousa.

On 2 May 2023 he made his first official state visit to Spain, in the company of his wife, the first lady, Verónica Alcocer, and some members of the cabinet, including the Minister of Foreign Affairs Álvaro Leyva, the Colombian ambassador to Spain, Eduardo Ávila, the Chief of Staff, Laura Sarabia, and the Ministers of Mines and Energy, Irene Vélez, of Commerce, Industry and Tourism, Germán Umaña, and of Education, Aurora Vergara.

Among the fundamental issues, they highlighted the mitigation of climate change, energy transition, investment and migration. In addition to highlighting the historical relations with Spain, this visit took on a special character since Spain will receive the presidency of the Council of the European Union in the middle of the year.

==== Switzerland ====
On Thursday, 10 August 2023, he received the President of Switzerland, Alain Berset, at the Casa de Nariño, where they signed an agreement in order to safeguard the fund, a digital copy of the documentary collection of the Commission for the Clarification of the Truth in Swiss. Agreement that had been approved by the Swiss Government on 21 July 2023.

== Controversies ==
=== Allegations against Petro's relatives ===
In March 2023, revelations emerged from Nicolás Petro Burgos's ex-wife, the president's eldest son, concerning alleged unreported receipts of money that could constitute illicit enrichment. President Petro published a letter asking prosecutor Francisco Barbosa to investigate his son "to the fullest extent" and also his brother Juan Fernando Petro, who has been mentioned in an alleged bribery case to receive benefits from the Total Peace law.

In July 2023, Nicolás Petro Burgos was arrested along with his ex-wife Day Vásquez for the crimes of money laundering and illicit enrichment. Petro Burgos declared to the Prosecutor's Office that irregular money had indeed entered Gustavo Petro's presidential campaign.

=== Laura Sarabia case ===
The Laura Sarabia case was a political scandal in Colombia that occurred during Petro's government. In this case, several people were investigated, including then Chief of Staff Laura Sarabia, for alleged abuse of authority in supposedly ordering a polygraph test to be administered to her son Marelbys Meza's nanny. Security personnel from the presidential house are likewise under investigation for allegedly having carried out illegal wiretaps on Meza and another woman. The conduct and statements of Armando Benedetti are also under investigation, from which insinuations arose of irregular financing in Petro's presidential campaign.

The case began in May 2023 when the magazine Semana published on its cover the photograph of Marelbys Meza, a person previously unknown to public opinion who identified herself as the nanny of the son of the then Chief of Staff, Laura Sarabia. In that article, Meza stated that she had been subjected to a polygraph test by the security services of the Casa de Nariño to answer for the loss of around seven thousand dollars in cash that had apparently been taken from a suitcase located at Laura Sarabia's residence and which, according to Sarabia, was part of the travel expenses she received for her trips abroad. Weeks earlier, Sarabia had mentioned the theft case in an interview with the newspaper El Tiempo. Meza failed the polygraph test; however, it is a voluntary test and cannot be used as judicial evidence. What caused the greatest controversy, though, was the fact that state security services were used to administer a test to a person employed outside those services.

After publication of that article, journalist Daniel Coronell revealed in his W Radio report that Meza had been recommended to work for Sarabia by the then ambassador to Venezuela, Armando Benedetti, who had also recommended Sarabia within Gustavo Petro's circle, since she had been part of his Legislative Work Unit (UTL). It also became known that Meza had previously failed a polygraph test when she worked for Benedetti as a nanny years earlier because of the loss of other money. It also emerged that days before Semana's publication, Benedetti had asked Meza to travel to Venezuela to meet with him, taking her on a private flight. Benedetti had expressed his displeasure at not receiving a high office in the government and had a grudge against Sarabia for not following his instructions.

After these events, the Attorney General's Office published an investigation on 1 June 2023 as a result of a complaint filed by Marelbys Meza, former nanny of then Chief of Staff Laura Sarabia, and then Colombian ambassador to Venezuela Armando Benedetti, in which it said it had discovered that Meza's cell phone had been illegally wiretapped since 30 January of that year. Meza had filed the complaint after accusing Sarabia of using a polygraph test against her at the Casa de Nariño, after Meza had allegedly committed a theft of money at Sarabia's residence.

As a result of the scandal, Petro requested the resignation of both Sarabia and Benedetti on 3 June, in order, as he declared, "so that from the power implied by those posts there can be not even the suspicion that the investigation processes will be altered".

Days later, the cleaning employee at Sarabia's house also claimed to have been illegally wiretapped. By 24 June 2023, four people had said they had been illegally wiretapped, including Meza herself, all cases in which Gustavo Petro has said that neither he nor the national government are involved.

Colonel Óscar Dávila, head of an office in the DIAN building, part of the security apparatus of the President of the Republic and involved in the case, participated in a Prosecutor's Office inspection of the office on 7 June 2023. Dávila was found dead two days later, on 9 June, under strange circumstances. His autopsy concluded that Dávila died by suicide, although what may have motivated him to take his own life is still unknown.

==== Events ====
===== Use of polygraph against Marelbys Meza =====
On 30 January 2023, Marelbys Meza, nanny of Laura Sarabia (then Chief of Staff), was subjected to a polygraph test at the Casa de Nariño after being accused of having stolen an undetermined amount of money, initially said not to exceed $7 thousand USD. The test was voluntary and had no evidentiary value in legal proceedings, although Meza later said she had been pressured into signing the authorization document for the test and that she "felt kidnapped" during it.

Meza filed a complaint against Sarabia that became public on 27 May 2023. That day, an interview with Meza by the magazine Semana was published, in which she said she felt distressed and threatened by Sarabia and by the way she said she had been treated by the authorities, including that a police officer on the scene had said the amount stolen was $150 million COP ($33 thousand USD at the time).

===== Wiretapping report =====
On 1 June 2023, the Attorney General's Office published an investigation carried out after Meza had filed her complaint, in which it said that Meza and another woman named Fabiola had been wiretapped (intercepted by telephone) by the Dijín for at least 10 days. To do this, the Dijín had allegedly falsified a judicial police report that presented the nannies as members of the Clan del Golfo, under the aliases La cocinera for Meza, and La madrina for Fabiola. During the presentation of the report, charges against members of the Dijín were also announced, and both Sarabia and then Colombian ambassador to Venezuela Armando Benedetti were summoned for questioning.

Caracol Radio reported that a judicial analyst said a prosecutor had later received authorization to permit the interceptions on 26 January of that year, with interception of both phones beginning on the 30th of that same month, the same day the polygraph test was allegedly conducted. Seventy-two hours later, that analyst had allegedly requested that the interceptions be stopped, asserting that the way they were being used did not correspond to the reasons given for initiating them.

The magazine Cambio reported that an intelligence analyst, ten days after 26 January, had realized that the interceptions of both numbers contained records of daily activities corresponding to a woman living in southern Bogotá who had nothing to do with the Clan del Golfo, and that woman turned out to be Meza.

==== Reactions ====
===== Meza's complaint =====
After learning of the complaint about the use of the polygraph, prior to the public release of the Prosecutor's Office investigation into the case, the national government commented on it, asserting that all procedures established by law had been followed, including the filing of a complaint against Meza by Sarabia the day before the polygraph was used, and denying that any abuse of power had occurred. President Gustavo Petro described the matter as a "lie" on his Twitter account.

Attorney General Francisco Barbosa, when presenting the findings of the investigation, compared them with the wiretapping scandal of the government of Álvaro Uribe. His statements were controversial, since, critics said, they "compared a smaller-scale event with an event of national political persecution".

Federico Gutiérrez, former candidate in the 2022 Colombian presidential election, wrote a column in Semana expressing concern about what he described as "a crisis of Colombian institutions", voicing fear over the possibility that "Petro has wiretapped us [the opposition]".

Senator Clara López became involved in a controversy after a statement on the scandal in which, while trying to show why she believed the case was being exaggerated, she referred to Meza as a "servant". López later apologized for the remarks.

Thierry Ways, columnist for El Tiempo, wrote an opinion article expressing concern over what this case would imply, arguing that "if even a private nanny, who is not a recognized figure or the subject of an investigation, can be wiretapped, who is safe from being wiretapped in Colombia?", in response to López's statements.

===== Death of Óscar Dávila =====
Gustavo Petro commented on the death of Óscar Dávila, asserting that he had committed suicide. Petro commented again a few days later, this time regarding the Prosecutor's Office autopsy of Dávila concluding that he had indeed died by suicide, asserting that the report "disproved the insinuations that it was a murder", that "communications were not intercepted, nor were human rights violated, and there is nothing to hide". He added that he personally was not "implicated in any way in the matter".

Miguel Ángel del Río, Dávila's lawyer, commented after publication of the autopsy. Del Río asserted that this was a case of "suicide of opportunity", that is, according to Del Río, Dávila had been pressured by an external agent into committing suicide, with Del Río describing that "external agent" as "an alleged Prosecutor's Office official".

Paloma Valencia, senator for the Democratic Centre party, said that "the problem here is not whether it was a murder or a suicide, the problem is that there was a dead person", referring to the fact that the death occurred after various details of the scandal had come to public light. María Fernanda Cabal, senator from the same party, made similar statements, additionally linking the scandal to a controversy during the 2022 presidential election in which two people associated with the Historic Pact (Petro's coalition) visited the prison La Picota.

===== Allegations of political motivation =====
The scandal has been alleged of being a smokescreen to divert attention from Salvatore Mancuso's accusations before the Special Jurisdiction for Peace (JEP) against numerous political, military and business figures participating in the framework of the Colombian armed conflict, specifically developments in the 1990s and 2000s, allegedly aiming to "destabilize Petro's government".

Catalina Rojano of the newspaper El Heraldo, in an opinion column, criticized the massive coverage of the scandal in Colombian media in comparison with Mancuso's statements. Rojano said verbatim:

That the case involving the former Chief of Staff of the national government and the former Colombian ambassador to Venezuela is extremely controversial does not mean it should be treated and described as the most relevant matter before public opinion. What Mancuso said before the Special Jurisdiction for Peace (JEP) must not be lost from sight, because ignoring that truth that muddies so many means we are a society indulgent toward horrific crimes that should never happen again; a society indifferent to a painful reality that must not be erased from our history, but investigated, precisely so that it does not happen again.

Gustavo Petro himself has said that the scandal is part of an orchestrated process intended to "carry out a soft coup" against his government. Different political figures from more than 20 countries, such as Rafael Correa, Noam Chomsky, Jeremy Corbyn, Ada Colau, José Luis Rodríguez Zapatero and former Colombian president Ernesto Samper, signed a letter in which, although the case was not directly mentioned, it was asserted that "the power of the country's regulatory and judicial agencies is being used to halt [the Petro government's] reforms, intimidate its supporters and defame it internationally", also mentioning Attorney General Francisco Barbosa, saying that he, יחד with the Inspector General Margarita Cabello Blanco, "are actively [targeting] members of the Historic Pact with investigations that could result in suspension or dismissal".

Semanario Voz, newspaper of the Colombian Communist Party, described the scandal as an "attempt to destabilize Petro's government", comparing media coverage of the scandal with the way Nazi propaganda worked, stating verbatim:

The game [referring to the scandal] is completed with the Nazi principle of orchestration, when the media themselves reproduce politicians' statements, invite "erudite" analysts who warn of a "serious crisis" without specifying what it consists of, and publish polls in which the president and the Government see their support among citizens diminished. [...] Here what matters is implanting a perception, not giving it content or explanation.

On 29 May 2023, Gustavo Petro stated on his Twitter account: "Look at my astonishment because there was no in-depth media coverage of what Mancuso's confessions meant. [sic]", in response to a post by Vicky Dávila (director of Semana magazine) about how W Radio had not covered the scandal. Dávila responded to Petro's statements, emphasizing that Mancuso's accusations had received coverage in Colombian media and accusing Petro of hypocrisy regarding the scandal.

=== Corruption scandal in the UNGRD ===
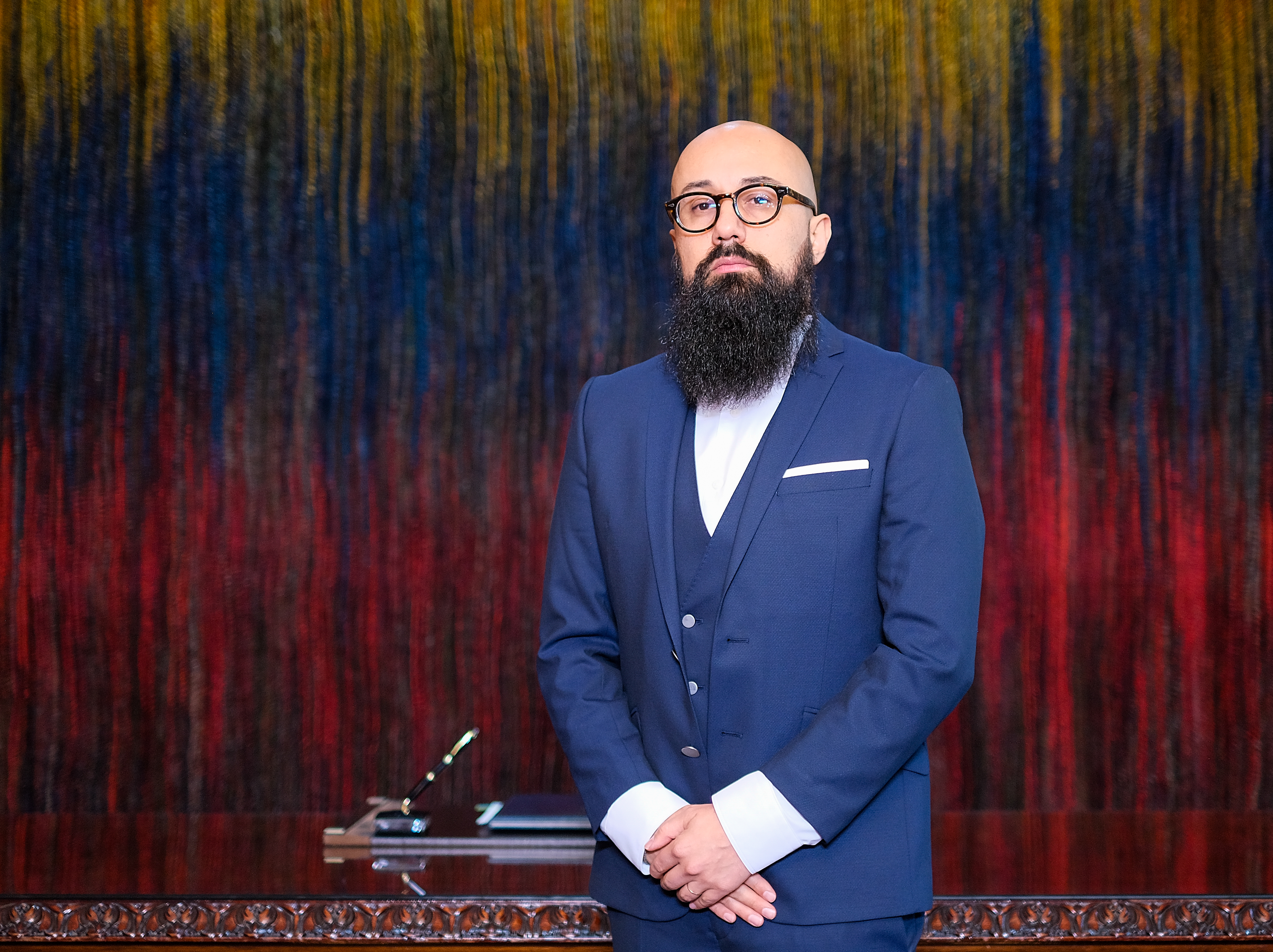
The new Director of the UNGRD, Carlos Carrillo, after the resignation of Olmedo López.

The corruption scandal in the National Unit for Disaster Risk Management (UNGRD), which came to light in 2024, involves a network of bribery and malpractice in the awarding of contracts, seriously affecting the management of public resources during Gustavo Petro's government. This case has been described as one of the largest of the government.

The scandal initially came to light around the acquisition and management of tanker trucks in La Guajira intended to distribute drinking water in this region, which faces a serious water crisis. The UNGRD bought these tanker trucks for a price that, according to complaints, was significantly inflated, reaching overcosts of up to double their real value. It is estimated that 725 million pesos were paid for each vehicle, although their cost should have been around 350 million.

The scandal revolves not only around the overpricing but also alleged acts of corruption, such as document forgery and the payment of bribes. Key officials, such as former UNGRD director Olmedo López and his deputy, Sneyder Pinilla, were accused of participating in corrupt arrangements. They are accused of awarding contracts directly in exchange for political support in Congress.

It has also been alleged that part of the money that was supposed to improve water distribution ended up in the hands of congress members, which has escalated the investigation toward senior government and legislative officials. In the midst of the process, the UNGRD has opened new tenders in an attempt to regain the confidence of the insurance sector and ensure that the tanker trucks finally fulfill their function.

Among the key elements of the case are evidence including telephone interceptions, testimonies and documents showing how companies without technical or financial capacity benefited from multimillion contracts, some of which were related to money laundering. The investigation has expanded to high-level officials, among them the president of the Senate, Iván Name, and other members of Congress who allegedly received part of these bribes.

==== Residence of Carlos Ramón González in Nicaragua ====
In August 2025, it was revealed that Carlos Ramón González, former director of the DAPRE and former intelligence chief, close to President Petro and currently under investigation for corruption linked to the National Unit for Disaster Risk Management (UNGRD), had allegedly resided in Managua since November 2024. Leaked documents show that the Colombian embassy in Nicaragua requested the renewal of his residency on 21 May 2025, the same day the Prosecutor's Office charged him with bribery and embezzlement.

The Foreign Ministry and President Petro denied having authorized this procedure or having formal knowledge of it, and announced an internal disciplinary investigation. Petro also officially requested that the Nicaraguan government hand González over if it was confirmed that he was a resident, and stated that "I do not protect them either", during a Council of Ministers meeting.

=== Campaign financing ===
The president during a presidential address on the opening of investigations by the CNE.

The alleged irregular financing of the campaign of Gustavo Petro, president of Colombia, was a matter of controversy for several months, generating investigations and accusations.

==== Context ====
The scandal arose when Nicolás Petro, son of President Gustavo Petro, was accused of receiving money from businesspeople during the 2022 presidential campaign, money that, according to the accusations, was not officially reported in the campaign's accounts. Nicolás Petro was detained at the end of July 2023 along with his ex-wife Day Vásquez on charges of money laundering and illicit enrichment, within the framework of an investigation that sought to clarify whether these illicit funds had been used to finance the campaign. Colombia's National Electoral Council (CNE) brought charges against Gustavo Petro's presidential campaign for alleged irregularities in its financing during the 2022 elections. These allegations were related to the possible receipt of undeclared resources or resources from sources prohibited by Colombian electoral law, which would violate political campaign financing rules.

==== Key allegations ====
- Money of illicit origin: According to Day Vásquez's statements, Nicolás Petro allegedly received money from drug traffickers and businesspeople, including former drug trafficker Samuel Santander Lopesierra (alias the "Marlboro Man") and businessman Alfonso "el Turco" Hilsaca. She alleged that the money was not used in full for Gustavo Petro's campaign, but that part of these funds were used by Nicolás Petro for personal benefit.
- Alleged irregular financing: The accusations center on the possible lack of transparency in Petro's campaign financing. Although Nicolás Petro admitted having received money, he stated that those resources did not go to his father's campaign, but that he used them for other personal purposes.
- CNE: The investigation arises from complaints alleging that Petro's campaign may have received money from contracts awarded by public entities, which would be illegal. Specifically, it has been mentioned that resources from the government of President Iván Duque, which was in office during that period, may have been used, raising the possibility that public funds were diverted for electoral purposes. It has also been questioned whether all campaign income and expenses were properly reported, as required by law.

==== Petro's response ====
President Petro has denied any knowledge of or participation in these events. He stated that he was not aware of his son's actions and that he would not allow his government to be stained by acts of corruption. He also emphasized that his campaign was managed transparently and that he would support the investigations to clarify the facts. After the CNE opened proceedings against Petro, he accused the body of the "beginning of a coup d'etat", since it was violating presidential immunity and what it was seeking was "to bring him down".
