= Cabinet of Iván Duque =

Members of President Iván Duque's Cabinet

Duque Cabinet
- Cabinet of Colombia
- 2018-2022
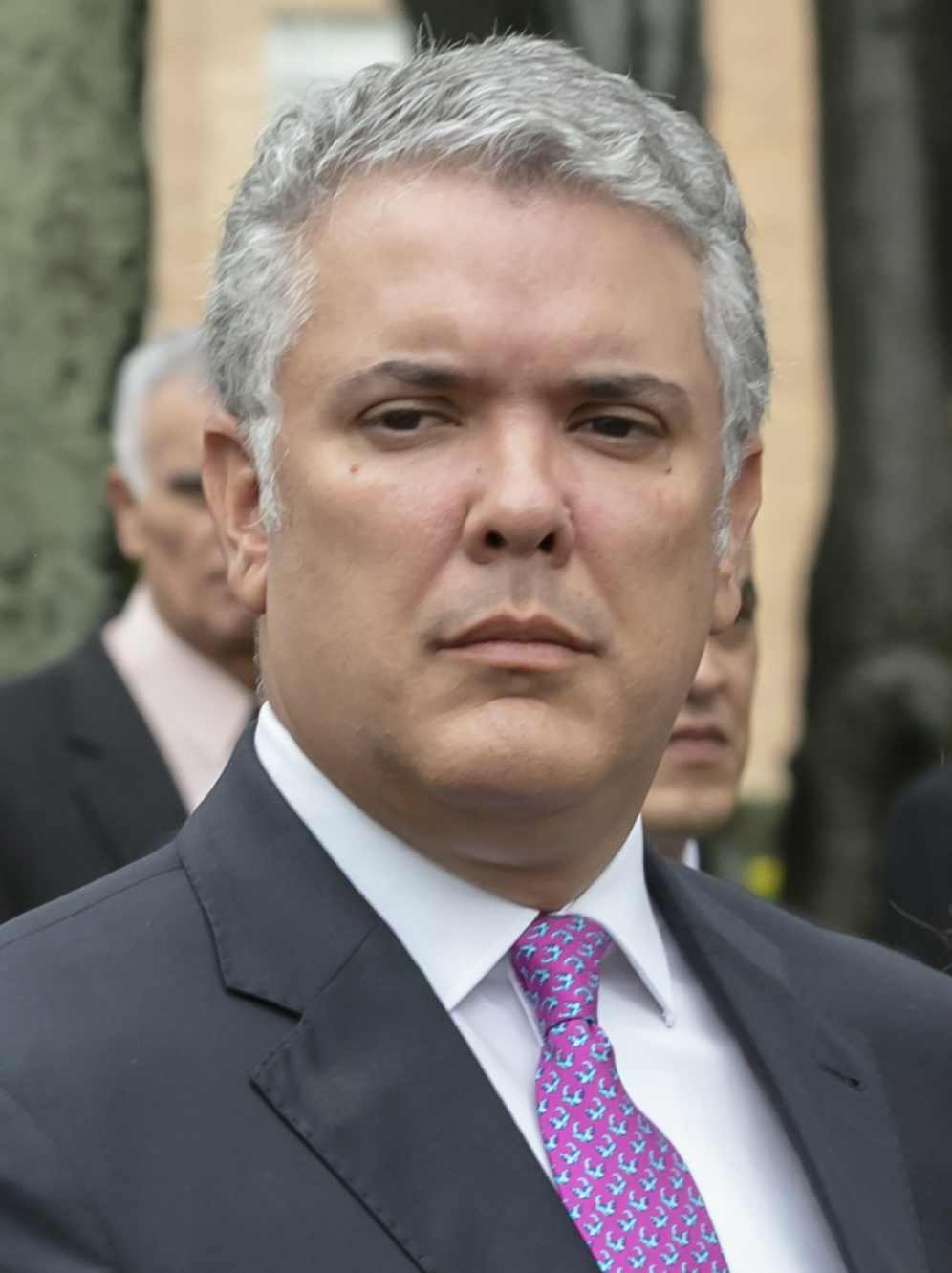
- Ivan Duque
- Date formed: 7 August 2018
- Date dissolved: 7 August 2022

People and organisations
- President: Iván Duque
- President's history: 2018-2022
- Vice President: Marta Lucía Ramírez
- No. of ministers: 23 (incl. Cabinet-level members)
- Member parties: Democratic Center; Radical Change; Conservative Party; Liberal Party; Union Party for the Pople
- Status in legislature: Coalition government
- Opposition parties: Decency List; Green Party; Commons; ASI; AICO; MAIS

History
- Election: 2018 Colombian presidential election
- Legislature term: 9th Congress of Colombia
- Advice and consent: Senate
- Predecessor: Cabinet of Juan Manuel Santos
- Successor: Cabinet of Gustavo Petro

Duque appointed all the 16 ministers and high councilors before his inauguration as president, once the inauguration ceremony was over and during his government he induced the creation of two new ministries, derived from the disappeared departments of Coldeportes and Colciencias.

== Cabinet ==
Office	Name	Term
President	Iván Duque	August 7, 2018 – August 7, 2022
Vice President	Marta Lucía Ramírez	August 7, 2018 – August 7, 2022
Minister of the Interior	Nancy Patricia Gutiérrez	August 7, 2018 - February 13, 2020
Minister of the Interior	Alicia Arango	February 13, 2020 - December 22, 2020
Minister of the Interior	Daniel Palacios	December 22, 2020 - August 7, 2022
Minister of Foreign Affairs	Carlos Holmes Trujillo	August 7, 2018 - November 12, 2019
Minister of Foreign Affairs	Claudia Blum	November 12, 2019 - May 9, 2021
Minister of Foreign Affairs	Marta Lucía Ramírez	May 19, 2021 - August 7, 2022
Minister of Finance and Public Credit	Alberto Carrasquilla	August 7, 2018 - May 3, 2021
Minister of Finance and Public Credit	José Manuel Restrepo	May 18, 2021 - August 7, 2022
Minister of Justice and Law	Gloria María Borrero	August 7, 2018 - May 16, 2019
Minister of Justice and Law	Margarita Cabello	June 11, 2019 - August 17, 2020
Minister of Justice and Law	Javier Sarmiento	August 24, 2020 - October 5, 2020
Minister of Justice and Law	Wilson Ruiz	October 5, 2020 - August 7, 2022
Minister of Defense	Guillermo Botero	August 7, 2018 - November 6, 2019
Minister of Defense	Luis Fernando Navarro (acting)	November 6, 2019 - November 12, 2019
Minister of Defense	Carlos Holmes Trujillo	November 12, 2019 - January 26, 2021
Minister of Defense	Luis Fernando Navarro (acting)	January 26, 2021 - February 6, 2021
Minister of Defense	Diego Molano	February 6, 2021 - August 7, 2022
Minister of Agriculture and Rural Development	Andrés Valencia	August 7, 2018 - February 24, 2020
Minister of Agriculture and Rural Development	Rodolfo Enrique Zea	February 24, 2020 - August 7, 2022
Minister of Health and Social Protection	Juan Pablo Uribe	August 7, 2018 - December 26, 2019
Minister of Health and Social Protection	Iván Dario González (acting)	December 26, 2019 - February 23, 2020
Minister of Health and Social Protection	Fernando Ruiz	March 3, 2020 - August 7, 2022
Minister of Labour	Alicia Arango	August 7, 2018 - February 13, 2020
Minister of Labour	Ángel Custodio Cabrera	February 27, 2020 - August 7, 2022
Minister of Mines and Energy	María Fernanda Suárez	August 7, 2018 - July 2, 2020
Minister of Mines and Energy	Diego Mesa Puyo	July 2, 2020 - August 7, 2022
Minister of Commerce, Industry and Tourism	José Manuel Restrepo	August 7, 2018 - May 3, 2021
Minister of Commerce, Industry and Tourism	Laura Valdivieso (acting)	May 3, 2021 - May 19, 2021
Minister of Commerce, Industry and Tourism	María Ximena Lombana	June 4, 2021 - August 7, 2022
Minister of National Education	María Victoria Angulo	August 7, 2018 – August 7, 2022
Minister of Environment and Sustainable Development	Ricardo Lozano	August 7, 2018 – October 3, 2020
Minister of Environment and Sustainable Development	Carlos Eduardo Correa	October 3, 2020 - August 7, 2022
Ministry of Housing, City and Territory	Jonathan Malagón	August 7, 2018 – March 23, 2022
Ministry of Housing, City and Territory	Susana Correa	March 23, 2022 - August 7, 2022
Minister of Information Technologies and Communications	Sylvia Constaín	August 7, 2018 - May 4, 2020
Minister of Information Technologies and Communications	Karen Abudinen	May 4, 2020 - September 9, 2021
Minister of Information Technologies and Communications	Iván Mauricio Durán (acting)	September 9, 2021 - September 28, 2021
Minister of Information Technologies and Communications	Carmen Ligia Valderrama	October 20, 2021 - August 7, 2022
Minister of Transport	Ángela María Orozco	August 7, 2018 – August 7, 2022
Minister of Culture	Carmen Vásquez	August 7, 2018 - December 24, 2020
Minister of Culture	Felipe Buitrago	January 12, 2021 - June 4, 2021
Minister of Culture	Angélica Mayolo	June 4, 2021 - August 7, 2022
Minister of Sports	Ernesto Lucena	September 16, 2019 - July 27, 2021
Minister of Sports	Guillermo Herrera	July 27, 2021 - August 7, 2022
Minister of Science, Technology and Innovation	Mabel Gisela Torres	January 11, 2020 - June 15, 2021
Minister of Science, Technology and Innovation	Tito José Criessen	June 22, 2021 - August 7, 2022

== See also ==
- Council of Ministers of Colombia
