= Rosemberg Pabón =

Colombian political scientist

Rosemberg Pabón Pabón

Director of the National Administrative Department of Solidary Economy
- In office September 6, 2006 – 2 November 2011
- President: Álvaro Uribe (2006-2010); Juan Manuel Santos (2010-present)
- Preceded by: Alfredo Sarmiento Narváez

Senator of Colombia
- In office July 20, 2004 – November 1, 2004
- In office July 22, 2003 – October 22, 2003

Mayor of Yumbo
- In office January 1, 1998 – November 17, 2000
- Preceded by: Carlos Alberto Moreno Herrera
- Succeeded by: Alba Leticia Chávez Jiménez

Personal details
- Born: January 1, 1947 (age 79) Yumbo, Cauca Valley, Colombia
- Party: Democratic Center
- Other political affiliations: M-19 (1970-2000); Alternative Way (2002); Independent Democratic Pole (2003-2005)Democratic Center(2006-actually)
- Education: Santiago de Cali University (B.Sc); University of the Andes (M.Sc)
- Profession: Political Scientist

Rosemberg Pabón Pabón (born January 1, 1947) is a Colombian political scientist who served as the Director of the National Administrative Department of Solidary Economy (DanSocial). A former leader of the M-19 guerrilla movement, he commanded the 1980 Dominican Embassy siege in Bogotá. After the Government reached a peace deal with the M-19, Pabón returned to the country, re-entered society and entered politics, first as a Delegate to the National Constituent Assembly in 1991, then as Mayor of Yumbo from 1998 to 2000, and as Senator for Congress in 2003 and 2004.

== Involvement with the M-19 ==
=== Exile in Cuba and demobilization ===
Pabón lived in exile in Cuba, after the siege, remaining a member of the M-19. He returned to Colombia in 1984, and participated in the siege of the city of Yumbo. He returned to civilian life after M-19 signed a peace treaty with the Colombian government in March 1990.

== Political career ==
=== Mayor of Yumbo ===
In 1997, Pabón successfully ran for Mayor of the Municipality of Yumbo as a M-19 candidate for the 1998-2000 period. His first concern as Mayor was to dissipate the public sector strike that had taken place under the administration of the previous mayor Carlos Alberto Moreno Herrera.

In 2000, Rosemberg resigned as Mayor of Yumbo to stand for as a candidate in the nearby elections for Mayor of Santiago de Cali. He temporarily stepped down leaving Abraham Rubio Quiroga as interim Mayor of Yumbo before the next elections, and was finally replaced by Alba Leticia Chávez Jiménez. His run for Mayor of Cali, however, proved unsuccessful, losing to John Maro Rodríguez Flórez.

His administration was criticized for misuse of the public coffers, leaving a COP$5,200 million of deficit and impeding the pay of thousands of public sector employees.

=== Senator ===
In 2002, Pabón ran for the Senate of Colombia as third in line from the Alternative Way Senate list of Antonio Navarro Wolff, another former M-19 member, however Navarro's list only managed to get enough votes for two seats. In 2004, Pabón replaced Navarro in the Senate from July 20 to November 1, an opportunity that repeated itself again from July 22 to October 22, 2003 when he replaced Gerardo Antonio Jumi Tapias.

During his time as Senator, Pabón voted in favor of proposed legislation that would have legalized recognition of same-sex unions in Colombia, however the proposed law that had the backing of prominent liberal senators like Piedad Córdoba could not amount the necessary votes to pass.

In 2005, Pabón left the Independent Democratic Pole, a left leaning coalition party which he himself had help found, among other reasons, Pabón was a strong supporter of the conservative leaning President Álvaro Uribe Vélez and believed that the Pole was taking "leftist radicalism of the maoist and procuban era." In 2006, Pabón once again ran for Senate this time trying to align himself more to the centre-right by joining the ranks of the political party Citizens' Convergence, this time around however proved more unsuccessful than before as Pabón was not able to get enough conservative votes and alienated his strong liberal base.

=== Director of DanSocial ===
On August 1, 2006, President Uribe named Pabón to head the National Administrative Department of Solidarity Economy, also known as DanSocial., the state agency in charge of formulating and developing policy on matters of solidarity economy. The agency was dissolved November 2, 2011.

== Works ==
- Pabón Pabón, Rosemberg (1998). Asi Nos Tomamos La Embajada [This Is How We Took Over The Embassy] (in Spanish). Bogotá: Planeta. ISBN 978-958-614-059-1. OCLC 12417237.
