= Ministry of the Interior (Colombia) =

Government ministry of Colombia

- Ministerio del Interior

Ministry overview
- Formed: 9 April 1886
- Preceding agencies: Ministry of the Government; Ministry of the Interior and Justice
- Headquarters: Casa La Giralda; Carrera 9 No. 14 A–10; Bogotá, D.C., Colombia
- Annual budget: COP$599,063,957,867 (2012)
- Ministry executive: Armando Benedetti, Minister of the Interior
- Website: www.mincit.gov.co

The Ministry of the Interior (MinInterior; Spanish: Ministerio del Interior) is the Cabinet position of the Government of Colombia in charge of managing the relations between the national government and the local administrative divisions; the relations between the executive branch and the legislative branch; and the relations between the Government and Indigenous, Afro-descendant, LGBT, and other vulnerable populations. It is similar to the interior ministries of other countries.

== History ==
In 1886, the Ministry of Government was created, which carried out functions of police and National Gendarmerie, National Archives, post and telegraph, hygiene and health. He was also in charge of the penitentiary system, personnel and material of the Supreme Court of Justice, Courts, Courts, Public Ministry, Notary, and Registrars of public and private Instruments, as well as mortgage annotators; In addition to the elections, electoral identification or electoral business, however, this remained until the creation of the electoral organization through Law 89 of 1948.

In the institutional evolution, it can be seen how the Ministry of the Interior has been framed by regulations such as Law 70 of 1993, which creates the Directorate for Black Communities, with the function of formulating public policies on this matter, bearing in mind the Consultative Commission high level; also ensure respect and compliance with the principles of equality, identity and cultural autonomy of black communities, which defends the Constitution of Colombia. In addition, with decree 2233 of 1995, the National Intelligence System was created, then in 1995, through Law 199, the Ministry of Government was transferred to the Ministry of the Interior, whose main functions were to formulate and adopt public policies. corresponding in matters of order and territorial autonomy; the relations between the National level and with the territorial entities, this in terms of public policy of decentralization and institutional development, among others.
