= Special Administrative Unit of Solidarity Organizations (Colombia) =

Colombian Executive Administrative Department

- Unidad Administrativa Especial de Organizaciones Solidarias

Agency overview
- Formed: 2 November 2011
- Preceding agency: National Administrative Department of Solidarity Economy
- Headquarters: Carrera 10 № 15-22; Bogotá, D.C., Colombia; 04°36′12.04″N 74°04′32.44″W
- Annual budget: COP$13,894,535,174 (2013); COP$12,349,087,000 (2014)
- Agency executive: Luis Eduardo Otero Coronado, Director
- Parent agency: Ministry of Labour
- Website: www.dansocial.gov.co

The Special Administrative Unit of Solidarity Organizations (Spanish: Unidad Administrativa Especial de Organizaciones Solidarias) is the Colombian Executive Administrative Department in charge of directing and coordinating government policy to promote, plan, protect, strengthen, and develop the organizations of social economy in order to improve the quality of life of the Colombian people.
