= National Institute of Concessions (Colombia) =

Colombian government agency

- Instituto Nacional de Concesiones

Agency overview
- Formed: 26 June 2003
- Dissolved: 3 November 2011
- Superseding agency: National Infrastructure Agency
- Headquarters: Avenida el Dorado, CAN; Bogotá, D.C., Colombia
- Annual budget: COP$967,784,718,574 (2010); COP$2,749,962,901,008 (2011); COP$3,782,862,700,000 (2012)
- Parent agency: Ministry of Transport
- Website: www.inco.gov.co

The National Institute of Concessions, INCO, was a Colombian government agency in charge of funding the planning and execution of road, river, sea, rail and port transportation projects in the country. It was dissolved and replaced by the National Infrastructure Agency in 2011.
