= National Administrative Department of Solidarity Economy (Colombia) =

- Departamento Administrativo Nacional de la Economía Solidaria

Agency overview
- Formed: 4 August 1998
- Preceding agency: National Administrative Department of Cooperatives
- Dissolved: 2 November 2011
- Superseding agency: Special Administrative Unit of Solidarity Organizations
- Headquarters: Carrera 10 № 15-22; Bogotá, D.C., Colombia
- Annual budget: COP$8,115,112,776 (2009); COP$7,612,041,696 (2011); COP$9,811,479,428 (2012)
- Parent agency: Ministry of Social Protection
- Website: www.dansocial.gov.co

The National Administrative Department of Solidarity Economy (Spanish: Departamento Administrativo Nacional de la Economía Solidaria, DanSocial) was a Colombian Executive Administrative Department in charge of directing and coordinating government policy to promote, plan, protect, strengthen, and develop the organizations of social economy in order to improve the quality of life of the Colombian people.
