= Executive Branch of Colombia =

Division of government in Columbia

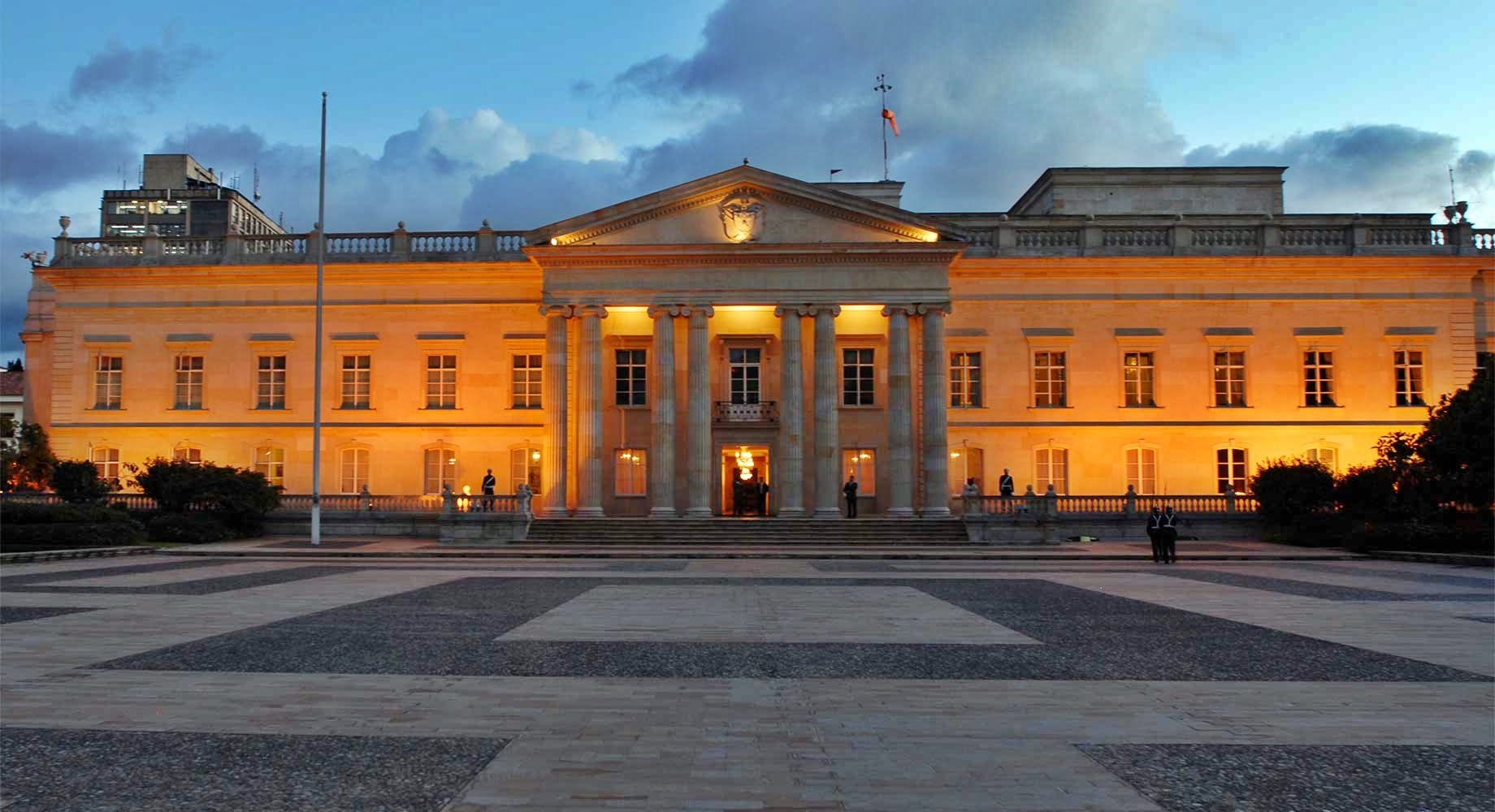
Casa de Nariño, the presidential palace in Bogotá houses the President of Colombia and maximum representative of the Executive Branch of Colombia.

The Executive Branch of Government in Colombia is one of the three branches of the government of Colombia under the Constitutional provision of separation of powers. The executive branch consists of the President of Colombia (elected by popular vote for a 4-year term) and its collaborating institutions; mainly the Council of Ministers (including Military and law enforcement agencies) and administrative departments supporting the executive branch (appointed by the president).

Each department (province) is led by a "department governor" with delegatory functions from the President of Colombia to govern in its respective department. Governors are elected representative of the municipalities that form a department. Each governor also appoints a local cabinet; the "department secretaries" to support its governing duties.

Furthermore, each municipality in Colombia is governed by a mayor (alcalde), which in turn delegates for the president of Colombia and the department governor within its municipal jurisdiction.

== See also ==
- List of entities in the executive branch of Colombia
