= Administrative Department of Public Service (Colombia) =

- Departamento Administrativo de la Función Pública

Agency overview
- Formed: 18 November 1958
- Preceding agency: Administrative Department of Civil Service
- Headquarters: Carrera 6 № 12-62 Bogotá, D.C., Colombia
- Annual budget: COP$13,195,200,000 (2011); COP$15,649,926,000 (2012); COP$19,405,550,000 (2013)
- Agency executive: Director; Deputy Director
- Child agency: ESAP
- Website: www.funcionpublica.gov.co

The Administrative Department of Public Service (Spanish: Departamento Administrativo de la Función Pública, DAFP) is the Colombian executive administrative department in charge of formulating the general policies of public administration, especially in matters relating to civil service, management, internal control and streamlined procedures of the Executive Branch of Colombia.

In 1958, the Congress of Colombia passed Law 19 of 1958, which created the Administrative Department of Civil Service (Departamento Administrativo del Servicio Civil), in an effort to give the public administration an agency in charge of managing the human resources of the State. On December 29, 1992, the Government issued Decree 2169 of 1992, which dramatically changed the agency, changing its name to Administrative Department of Public Service, and putting it in charge of formulating policies and assessment material in management and human resources to the State.

The DAFP also operates the School of Public Service, ESAP, to educate and prepare the next generation of public servants of Colombia.
