= Alternative Way =

Former political party in Colombia

The Alternative Way (Spanish: Vía Alterna) was a political party in Colombia founded in 1998 by Gustavo Petro and Antonio Navarro Wolff. In the 2002 parliamentary election, the party won one seat. It merged into the Independent Democratic Pole in July 2003.
