= Guillermo Reyes González =

Colombian lawyer and academic (born 1965)

Guillermo Reyes
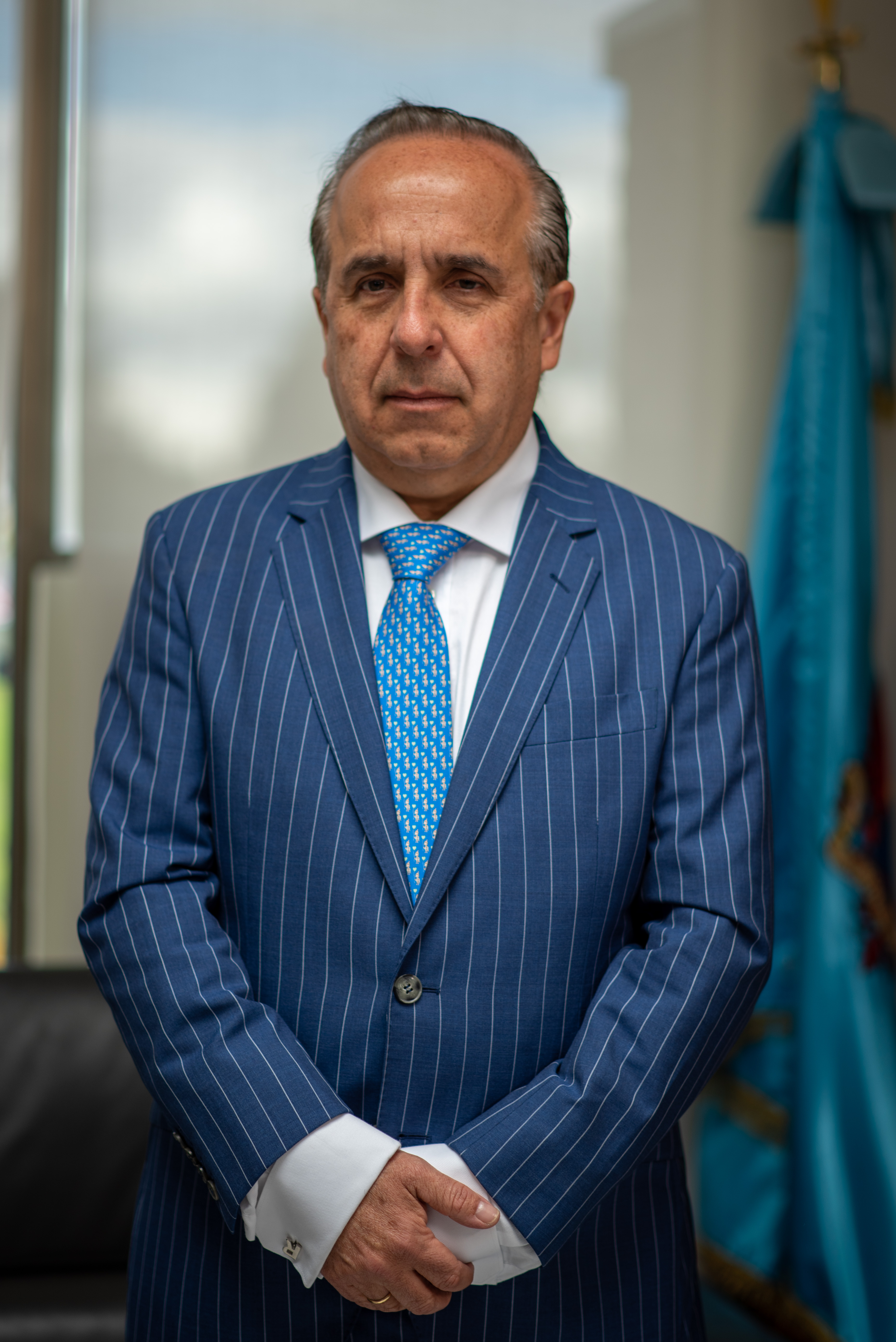
- Official portrait, 2022

Colombian Ambassador to Sweden
- In office May 4, 2023 – August 7, 2026
- President: Gustavo Petro
- Preceded by: María Ximena Espitia

Minister of Transport
- In office August 11, 2022 – June 26, 2023
- President: Gustavo Petro
- Preceded by: Ángela María Orozco
- Succeeded by: William Camargo

Deputy Minister of Justice
- In office September 1, 2006 – August 7, 2010
- President: Álvaro Uribe
- Minister: Sabas Pretelt de la Vega
- Preceded by: Luis Hernando Angarita
- Succeeded by: Guillermo Rivera

President of the National Electoral Council
- In office September 11, 2002 – September 11, 2006
- President: Álvaro Uribe

Assistant Magistrate of the Constitutional Court
- In office April 6, 1992 – June 15, 2000

Personal details
- Born: Guillermo Francisco Reyes González; October 26, 1965 (age 60) Barrancabermeja, Santander, Colombia
- Party: Conservative
- Spouse: Carmen Larrazábal
- Education: Del Rosario University (LLB)
- Profession: Lawyer

Guillermo Francisco Reyes González (born October 26, 1965) is a Colombian lawyer, writer and academic. Since August 11, 2022, he has held the position of Minister of Transport of his country, under the government of Gustavo Petro. Previously he was Deputy Minister of Justice, Counselor Minister of the Colombian Embassy before the United Nations and President of the National Electoral Council.

== Education ==
Guillermo Reyes graduated as a lawyer from the Faculty of Jurisprudence of the Universidad del Rosario de Colombia in 1989 and specialized in Tax Law at the same university, while he was part of the creation of the Séptima balloteta movement, which led him to be an advisor in the Constituent Assembly of Colombia in 1991. In 2010 he obtained his Diploma in Advanced Studies – DEA in Philosophy of Law from the Complutense University of Madrid and, in 2015, he received the degree of Doctor of Law with a mention in Philosophy of Law, Moral and Politics and Outstanding Cum Laude degree from the same university.

== Administrative/political career ==
In August 1992, Guillermo Reyes was appointed Assistant Magistrate of the Constitutional Court of Colombia, where he served until February 2000, when he resigned to serve as Rector of the Catholic University of Colombia, between March 2000 and July 2001. Reyes was Dean of the Faculty of law of the university from 2009 to 2011.

As counselor minister of the Colombian Embassy before the United Nations, he served as vice president of the Commission of Non-Governmental Organizations of the Economic and Social Council of the United Nations (ECOSOC), between 2001 and 2002, and was coordinator of the Human Rights Commission of Nations in New York in 2002, Vice President of the United Nations Commission on International Trade Law and Vice President of the Commission on Privileges and Immunities of State Agents.

Guillermo Reyes was president of the Colombian National Electoral Council from September 2002 to September 2006.

== Allegations of plagiarism ==
In October 2015, Semana alleged that Guillermo Reyes had plagiarised in his Complutense University of Madrid PhD thesis. Reyes denied the plagiarism, stating that there had been editing errors and that he had added errata. A prosecutor investigated the situation as a possible copyright violation and found that further investigation was not justified.

There were new allegations in 2022. Andrés Bermúdez Liévano, writing in La Silla Vacía, alleged that Reyes had plagiarised the work of Juan Fernando Jaramillo, co-founder of the legal research centre Dejusticia, in two other academic works. In the text "El nuevo orden político y electoral en Colombia" by Reyes, published in 2004 by Konrad Adenauer Foundation. According to Andrés Bermúdez, the 2004 text included four almost complete chapters (35 paragraphs) from "Los órganos electorales supremos", an article by Juan Fernando Jaramillo in the book "Tratado de derecho electoral comparado de América Latina", published in 1998 by Fondo de Cultura Económica mexicano.

According to Andrés Bermúdez, Reyes again copied several of the same pieces of text in "Régimen electoral y de partidos políticos. Elecciones presidenciales y parlamentarias", published by Biblioteca Jurídica Dike in 2014.

Reyes responded to the new allegations by stating to La Silla Vacía that it was not a case of plagiarism, and that in the 2004 publication, there had been omissions which were later corrected. He stated that in the 2014 case, he had given errata to the editors, but the errata had been omitted.

In June and July 2022, Diego Jaramillo, son of Juan Fernando Jaramillo, and Rodrigo Uprimny, a Colombian legal scholar and researcher at Dejusticia, referred to the allegations that Guillermo Reyes had plagiarised text by Juan Fernando Jaramillo. Rodrigo Uprimny stated that Reye's reasoning about having provided errata for his texts was "unacceptable" (Spanish: inaceptable), since errata are appropriate for minor errors, not to explain plagiarism of "whole pages".

Political offices
Preceded by Ángela María Orozco	Minister of Transport; 2022–2023	Succeeded by William Camargo
Diplomatic posts
Preceded by María Ximena Espitia	Colombian Ambassador to Sweden; 2023–2026	Incumbent
