= National Infrastructure Agency (Colombia) =

Government agency in Columbia

- Agencia Nacional de Infraestructura

Agency overview
- Formed: 3 November 2011
- Preceding agency: National Institute of Concessions
- Headquarters: Calle 26 № 59 Bogotá, D.C., Colombia
- Annual budget: COP$3,194,291,126,869 (2013); COP$2,480,795,934,000 (2014)
- Agency executive: President
- Parent agency: Ministry of Transport
- Website: www.ani.gov.co

The National Infrastructure Agency (Spanish: Agencia Nacional de Infraestructura, ANI), is a Colombian government agency, part of the Ministry of Transport, in charge of concessions through public–private partnerships, for the design, construction, maintenance, operation, and administration of the transport infrastructure in Colombia.
