= Gloria Inés Ramírez =

Colombian politician (born 1956)

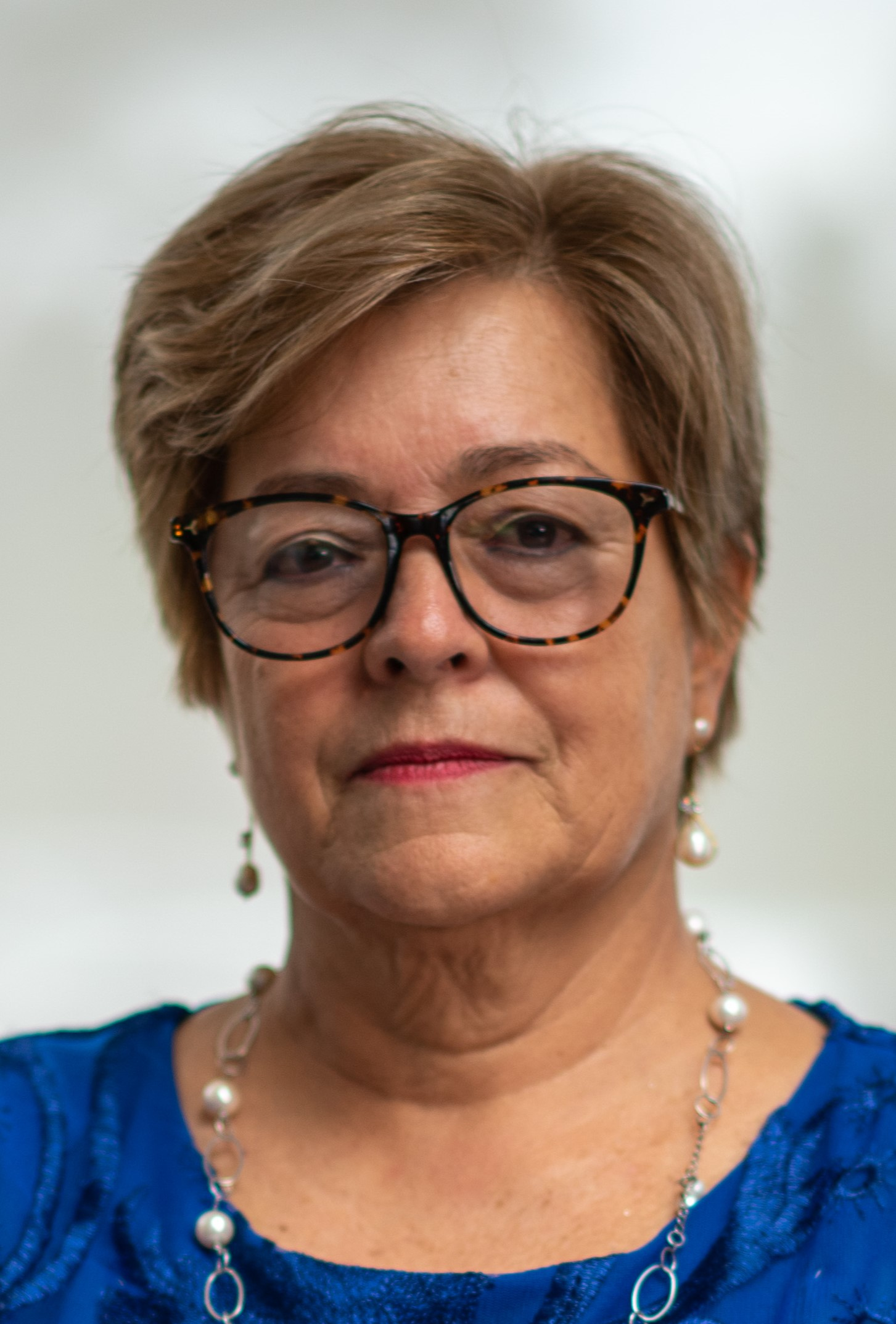
- Official portrait, 2022

Minister of Labour
- In office 11 August 2022 – 9 Febreuay 2025
- President: Gustavo Petro
- Preceded by: Ángel Custodio Cabrera
- Succeeded by: Antonio Sanguino

Senator of Colombia
- In office 20 July 2006 – 20 July 2014

Personal details
- Born: Gloria Inés Ramírez Rios; 8 May 1956 (age 70) Filadelfia, Caldas, Colombia
- Party: Colombian Communist Party
- Other political affiliations: Patriotic Union
- Education: Technological University of Pereira
- Profession: Educator; politician

Gloria Inés Ramírez Rios (born 8 June 1956) is a Colombian trade unionist, professor, and politician who served as Minister of Labor from 2022 to 2025. A member of the Colombian Communist Party, Ramírez resigned from her position as Minister of Labor in February 2025. She previously served as a Senator from 2006 to 2014.

Born in Filadelfia, Caldas, Ramírez served as president of the Colombian Federation of Educators. She was a member of the Central Union of Workers.

== Early life ==
She was born on 8 June 1956, in Filadelfia, Caldas. She has a degree in physics and mathematics from the Technological University of Pereira.

In her life as an educator, she has performed her role in mostly public institutions, which led her to see the reality of the country in which she lived: the conditions in which the classes were taught, the state of health of the children, the infrastructure of campuses, etc. From a very young age she was linked to the left, thus militating in the Colombian Communist Party and the Patriotic Union.

In addition, he has held positions within trade unionism; being president of the Colombian Federation of Educators (FECODE), and member of the executive committee of the Central Union of Workers of Colombia (CUT). She has also been a defender of women's rights, female emancipation and gender equality.

== Senator of Colombia ==
In the 2006 Colombian legislative elections, she was elected Senator of the Republic of Colombia with a total of 32,589 votes, representing the Alternative Democratic Pole (of which the Communist Party was a member at the time). Later in the 2010 Colombian legislative elections, she was re-elected as senator with a total of 36,335 votes.

She defended projects that sought the vindication of workers, homosexual rights and the recognition of conscientious objection to compulsory military service, which was promoted by the National Association of Secondary Students.

Gloria Inés Ramírez is the author of the law that criminalized femicide in Colombia. she also promoted other projects such as the creation of the Congressional Legal Commission for Equity for Women and the inclusion of unpaid housework in the National Accounts System.

== Minister of Labour ==
On 6 August 2022, President-elect Gustavo Petro announced the appointment of Gloria Inés Ramírez as the new Minister of Labour of Colombia. She officially began her duties as minister on 11 August.

On 29 August 2022, during the first official visit of President Gustavo Petro to Peru and the visit of Vice President Francia Márquez to the United States, Gloria Inés was appointed by the President as Minister Delegate, a position that performs the functions of the Head of State while the President is absent.

Political offices
Preceded by Ángel Custodio Cabrera	Minister of Labour; 2022–2025	Succeeded by Antonio Sanguino
