= Néstor Osuna =

Colombian lawyer (born 1963)

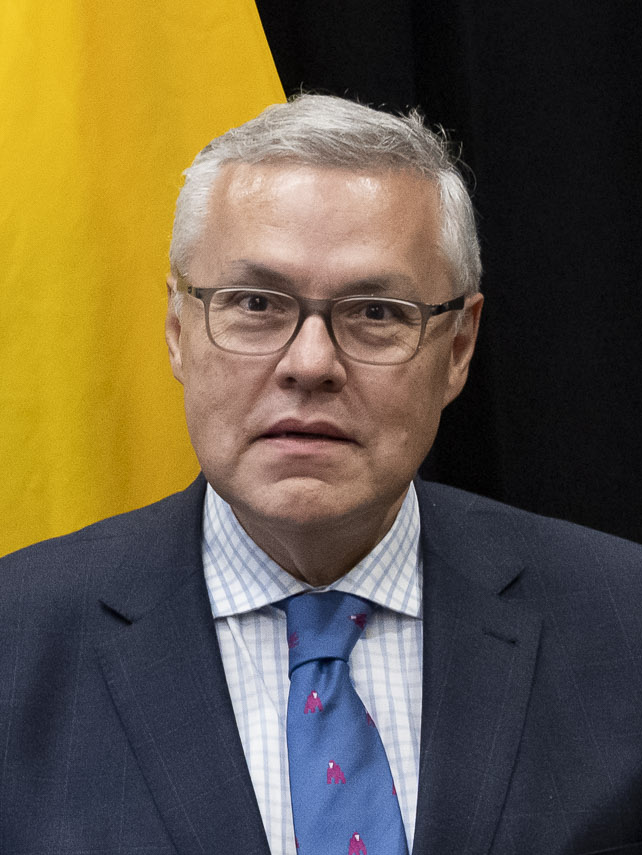
- Osuna in 2024.

Delegate Inspector for the Defense of Human Rights
- Incumbent
- Assumed office January 16, 2025
- Inspector: Gregorio Eljach
- Preceded by: Silvano Gómez

Minister of Justice
- In office August 7, 2022 – July 1, 2024
- President: Gustavo Petro
- Preceded by: Wilson Ruiz
- Succeeded by: Ángela María Buitrago

Magistrate of the Superior Council of Judicature
- In office January 1, 2014 – June 30, 2015

Co-Judge of the Constitutional Court
- In office May 10, 2005 – May 10, 2014

Personal details
- Born: Néstor Iván Osuna Patiño; April 12, 1963 (age 63) Bogotá, D.C., Colombia
- Party: Liberal
- Spouse: Mauricio Arroyave
- Education: Universidad Externado de Colombia (LLB); University of Salamanca (PhD)
- Profession: Lawyer

Néstor Iván Osuna Patiño (born April 12, 1963) is a Colombian lawyer, judge and politician who has served as Delegate Inspector for the Defense of Human Rights of Colombia since 2025. He previously served as a Co-Judge of the Constitutional Court, magistrate on the Superior Council of Judicature, and Minister of Justice and Law (2022–2024).

Born in Bogotá, D.C., Osuna graduated from the Universidad Externado de Colombia. He holds a doctorate from the University of Salamanca.

== Minister of Justice ==
On August 7, 2022, he was appointed by President Gustavo Petro as Minister of Justice and Law of Colombia; being the fourth minister in the history of Colombia to be openly gay. Days later, it was announced that he could not be sworn in, since he had requested a little more time to finish his work at the Universidad Externado de Colombia. On the 17th of the same month, he was sworn in as minister.

Political offices
Preceded by Wilson Ruiz	Minister of Justice and Law; 2022–2025	Succeeded by Ángela María Buitrago
Legal offices
Preceded by Silvano Gómez	Delegate Inspector for the Defense of Human Rights; 2025-present	Incumbent
