= Government entities of Colombia =

The Government entities of Colombia (Spanish: Entidades Gubernamentales de Colombia) are entities of the government of Colombia. The government entities include commissions, control agencies, administrative departments, directorates, funds, and superintendencies. Some of these agencies are under the supervision of the President of Colombia with special autonomy.

== Commissions ==
- Comision de Regulacion de Telecomunicaciones: commission that regulates the telecommunications industry trade.

== Administrative departments ==
- Administrative Department of the Presidency of the Republic - DAPR
- Administrative Department of Public Service - DAFP
- Administrative Department of Science, Technology and Innovation - Colciencias
- Administrative Department of Sport, Recreation, Physical Activity and the Use of Free Time - Coldeportes
- Administrative Department of Statistics - DANE
- Administrative Department of Planning - DNP
- Administrative Department of the National Intelligence Directorate - DNI
- Administrative Department of Social Prosperity - DPS
