= Council of Ministers of Colombia =

Government cabinet of Colombia

The Council of Ministers of the Republic of Colombia is composed of the most senior appointed politicians of the executive branch of the Government of Colombia. Members of the Cabinet are generally the heads of a Ministry Department. The existence of the Cabinet dates back to the first president, Simón Bolívar. These members were appointed in order to advise the president, and are therefore required to assist him in his duties as stated by the Colombian Constitution.

== Current Cabinet ==
The Cabinet of President Abelardo de la Espriella.

Office	Incumbent	Image	Term began
President of the Republic	Abelardo de la Espriella		7 August 2026
Vice President of the Republic	José Manuel Restrepo		7 August 2026
Minister of the Interior	Rodrigo Lara Restrepo		7 August 2026
Minister of Foreign Affairs	Omar Bula		7 August 2026
Minister of Finance and Public Credit	Miguel Gómez Martínez		7 August 2026
Minister of Justice and Law	Iván Cancino		7 August 2026
Minister of National Defense	Jorge Eduardo Mora		7 August 2026
Minister of Agriculture and Rural Development	Indalecio Dangond		7 August 2026
Minister of Health and Social Protection	Ana María Vesga		7 August 2026
Minister of Labour	Natalia López Fuentes		7 August 2026
Minister of Mines and Energy	María Nohemí Arboleda		7 August 2026
Minister of Commerce, Industry and Tourism	Mauricio Gómez Amín		7 August 2026
Minister of National Education	Viviane Morales		7 August 2026
Minister of Environment and Sustainable Development	Fabio Arjona		7 August 2026
Minister of Housing, City and Territory	Jaime Andrés Beltrán		7 August 2026
Minister of Information Technologies and Communications	Alexandra Falla		7 August 2026
Minister of Transport	Elsa Noguera		7 August 2026
Minister of Culture	Paola Holguín		7 August 2026
Minister of Science, Technology and Innovation	Claudia Benavides Salazar		7 August 2026
Minister of Sports	Juliana Gutiérrez		7 August 2026

== History ==
=== 19th century ===
In the Constitution of 1821, Simón Bolívar created a Cabinet composed of five secretariats:

- Secretariat of the Interior
- Secretariat of the Exterior
- Secretariat of War and Navy
- Secretariat of Finance and Public Credit

With time, areas of some secretariats were given to new institutions; in the mid-19th century, when the Secretariat of Trade was created, this deprived the Secretariat of the Exterior (then renamed Foreign Affairs) of that function.

In 1886, President Rafael Núñez changed their nomenclature from secretariats to ministries, and created new ones, so, in the beginning of the 20th century, after the Thousand Days War, the Council of ministers was composed of:

- Ministry of the Government
- Ministry of Justice
- Ministry of Foreign Affairs
- Ministry of War
- Ministry of Finance
- Ministry of the Treasury
- 1894 - The Ministry of Justice is disbanded.

The Secretary of Trade disappeared; its assignments were transferred to the Vice Ministry of Development, under the control of the Minister of Finance.

=== 20th century ===
1990's

- 1991 - The Ministry of Foreign Trade is created.
- 1992 - The Ministry of Public Works and Transport is renamed Ministry of Transport.
- 1993 - The Ministry of Justice is renamed Ministry of Justice and Law.
- 1993 - The Ministry of Environment is created.
- 1996 - The Ministry of Government is renamed the Ministry of the Interior.
- 1997 - The Ministry of Culture is created.

Ministries by the end of the 20th Century

- Ministry of the Interior
- Ministry of Finance and Public Credit
- Ministry of Justice and Law
- Ministry of National Defence
- Ministry of Health and Social Security
- Ministry of Labour
- Ministry of Agriculture and Rural Development
- Ministry of Foreign Trade
- Ministry of National Education
- Ministry of Mines and Energy
- Ministry of Transport
- Ministry of Communications
- Ministry of Environment
- Ministry of Economic Development
- Ministry of Culture

=== 21st Century ===
2000's

During the first administration of President Álvaro Uribe, Congress and the President passed Law 790 of 2002, which modified the existing ministries by merging and reducing their number to 13. In accordance with Article 7, the Ministries in order and precedence were then thus:

- Ministry of the Interior and Justice
  - Merging the Ministry of Justice and Law with the Ministry of the Interior.
- Ministry of Foreign Affairs
- Ministry of Finance and Public Credit
- Ministry of National Defense
- Ministry of Agriculture and Rural Development
- Ministry of Social Protection
  - Merging the Ministry of Labour and Social Security with the Ministry of Health.
- Ministry of Mines and Energy
- Ministry of Commerce, Industry and Tourism
  - Merging the Ministry of Foreign Trade with the Ministry of Economic Development.
- Ministry of National Education
- Ministry of Environment, Housing and Territorial Development
  - The Ministry of the Environment is enhanced and assigned matters of potable water, land use, sanitation, and rural development.
- Ministry of Communications
- Ministry of Transport
- Ministry of Culture
- 2009 - Passed on July 30, 2009, Law 1341 of 2009 redefined the Ministry of Communications and transformed it into the Ministry of Information Technologies and Communications.

2010's

- 2011 - The Ministry of the Interior and Justice is once again divided into the Ministry of the Interior and Ministry of Justice and Law.
- 2011 - The Ministry of Environment, Housing and Territorial Development is divided into the Ministry of Environment and Sustainable Development and the Ministry of Housing, City and Territory.
- 2011 - The Ministry of Social Protection is divided into the Ministry of Labour and the Ministry of Health and Social Protection.

=== Timeline of the Council of Ministers ===
Abbreviations used: Agr./Liv. - Agriculture and Livestock; Env./Hous./Terr. - Environment, housing and territorial development; Ind./Lab. - Industry and Labour; ICT - Information and communication technologies; Lab./Hyg./Soc. - Labour, hygiene and social protection.
