= Ministry of Labour (Colombia) =

Government ministry of Colombia

- Ministerio del Trabajo

Ministry overview
- Formed: 4 May 2011
- Preceding Ministry: Ministry of Social Protection
- Headquarters: Carrera 14 № 99-33; Bogotá, D.C., Colombia; 04°41′2.01″N 74°02′48.99″W
- Annual budget: COP$16,824,173,761,000 (2013); COP$21,725,797,929,867 (2014)
- Ministry executive: Minister
- Child agencies: SENA; DanSocial; SSF; Colpensiones
- Website: www.mintrabajo.gov.co

The Ministry of Labour (Spanish: Ministerio del Trabajo) is the national executive ministry of Colombia in charge of formulating, implementing, and orienting labour policy and labour relations to stimulate job growth through job creation programs. It is also in charge of labour rights, pensions, and occupational safety and health in Colombia.The post of Minister of Labour in Colombia is held by Gloria Inés Ramírez.
