= Ministry of Transport (Colombia) =

Government ministry of Colombia

- Ministerio de Transporte

Ministry overview
- Formed: 30 December 1992
- Preceding Ministry: Ministry of Public Works and Transport
- Headquarters: Avenida El Dorado Bogotá, D.C., Colombia; 04°38′46.17″N 74°05′46.84″W
- Annual budget: COP$365,428,400,000 (2012); COP$243,076,600,000 (2013); COP$283,272,440,000 (2014)
- Ministry executive: Minister
- Child agencies: INVÍAS; Aerocivil; ANI; Supertransporte
- Website: www.mintransporte.gov.co

The Ministry of Transport (Spanish: Ministerio de Transporte) is the national executive ministry of the Government of Colombia responsible for regulating transportation in Colombia.

== History ==
The Ministry of Transport was created in 1905 during the presidency of Rafael Reyes under the name of Ministerio de Obras Públicas y Transporte or Ministry of Public Works and Transport with the main function of taking care of national assets issues, including mines, oil (fuel), patents and trade marks, railways, roads, bridges, national buildings and land not privately owned.

In the early 20th century roads and highways maintenance and construction regulations were established. Rivers were cleaned, dragged and channeled and the navigational industry was organized. The Public works districts were created, as well as the Ferrocarriles Nacionales de Colombia (National Railways of Colombia). Among other major projects developed were the aqueduct of Bogotá, La Regadera Dam and the Vitelma Water Treatment Plant. The Ministry also created the National Institute of Transit (from the Spanish Instituto Nacional de Tránsito), (INTRA) under the Transport and tariffs Directorate and was in charge of designing the first National roads plan with the support of many foreign multinational construction companies.

== Late 20th century ==
In the late 20th century the ministry introduced regulations to install tolls on highways in order to finance public works and the Highway Police was restructured to participate more actively in the vigilance and control of transportation matters. Ports of Colombia was created to build, maintain and control the maritime and fluvial ports of the country. The Neighbouring Roads Fund was established to supervise constructions, improve and maintain roads and bridges. The Ministry also created the National Roads Fund financed with resources generated from fuel taxes to finance other road works.

In December 1993, the Colombian government restructured the entity seeking to improve it, formally naming it the Ministry of Transport. In the early year of 2000 the Ministry was once again subject of restructuring, this time receiving more autonomy to define, formulate and regulate transportation, transit and its infrastructure policies. In the last decade the Ministry has developed important projects; new roads and highways, tunnels and bridges, recovered some of the railway system, improved service and security in airports and maintains fluvial and maritime ways.
