= List of political appointments by Gustavo Petro =

Following his electoral victory in 2022, the President Gustavo Petro had 100 political appointments to the national government. Of those 1000 political appointments, among which were positions for members of the government coalition. Upon taking office, Petro quickly placed more than 60 high-level officials. As of May 12, 2023, according to the monitoring of La Silla Vacia, the Administrative Department of the Presidency of the Republic has confirmed 538 nominees, 1 has been announced, 67 are being considered by the President and at least 61 positions are still tracked. They have no candidate.

== Office of the President ==
| Office | Appointee | Assumed office | Left office |
|---|---|---|---|
| Chief of Staff of the Presidency | Laura Sarabia | August 7, 2022 | June 2, 2022 |
| Director of the DAPRE | Carlos Ramón González | May 1, 2023 | — |
| Director of the DAPRE | Mauricio Lizcano | August 7, 2022 | May 1, 2023 |
| Legal Secretary of the Presidency | Vladimir Fernández Andrade | August 7, 2022 | — |
| High Commissioner for Peace | Danilo Rueda | August 7, 2022 | — |
| Secretary of Transparency | Roberto Idárraga | September 1, 2022 | — |
| Secretary of Communications and Press | María Paula Fonseca | July 31, 2023 | — |
| Secretary of Communications and Press | Germán Gómez | September 1, 2022 | June 25, 2023 |
| Councilor for the Regions | Sandra Ortiz | May 12, 2023 | — |
| Councilor for the Regions | Luis Fernando Velasco | August 24, 2022 | May 1, 2023 |
| Counselor for Youngs | Gabriela Posso | August 24, 2022 | — |
| Counselor for Women's Equality | Clemecia Carabalí | September 13, 2022 | — |
| Counselor for National Reconciliation | Eva Ferrer | January 20, 2023 | — |
| Counselor for Human Rights | Jenny de la Torre | January 20, 2023 | — |

== Office of the Vice President ==
| Office | Appointee | Assumed office | Left office |
|---|---|---|---|
| Chief of Staff of the Vice Presidency | Ginna Rivera | August 24, 2022 | — |
| Director of Special Projects | Jhonattan Duque | August 24, 2022 | — |

== National ministries ==
=== Ministry of the Interior ===
| Office | Nominee | Assumed office | Left office |
|---|---|---|---|
| Minister of the Interior | Armando Benedetti | March 1, 2025 (Announced February 23, 2025) | — |
| Minister of the Interior | Juan Fernando Cristo | July 3, 2024 (Announced July 3, 2024) | February 10, 2025 |
| Minister of the Interior | Luis Fernando Velasco | May 1, 2023 (Announced April 26, 2023) | July 3, 2024 |
| Minister of the Interior | Alfonso Prada | August 7, 2022 (Announced April 6, 2022) | April 26, 2023 |
| Vice Minister for Participation and Equal Rights | Gabriel Rondón | July 8, 2024 | — |
| Vice Minister for Participation and Equal Rights | Clemencia Solano | August 11, 2022 | July 7, 2024 |
| Vice Minister for Political Relations | Gustavo García Figueroa | August 11, 2022 | — |

=== Ministry of Foreign Affairs ===
| Office | Nominee | Assumed office | Left office |
|---|---|---|---|
| Minister of Foreign Affairs | Álvaro Leyva | August 7, 2022 (Announced June 25, 2022) | — |
| Vice Minister for Foreign Affairs | Francisco Coy | August 11, 2022 | — |
| Vice Minister for Multilateral Affairs | Elizabeth Taylor Jay | March 15, 2023 | — |
| Vice Minister for Multilateral Affairs | Laura Gil Savastano | August 11, 2022 | March 15, 2023 |

=== Ministry of Finance and Public Credit ===
| Office | Nominee | Assumed office | Left office |
|---|---|---|---|
| Minister of Finance and Public Credit | Ricardo Bonilla | May 1, 2023 (Announced April 26, 2023) | — |
| Minister of Finance and Public Credit | José Antonio Ocampo | August 7, 2022 (Announced June 25, 2022) | April 26, 2023 |
| Vice Minister General of Fiance | Diego Guevara | August 11, 2022 | — |
| Vice Minister of Public Credit | Daniel Osorio | May 1, 2023 | — |
| Vice Minister of Public Credit | Gonzalo Hernández | August 11, 2022 | May 1, 2023 |

=== Ministry of Justice and Law ===
| Office | Nominee | Assumed office | Left office |
|---|---|---|---|
| Minister of Justice and Law | Néstor Osuna | August 7, 2022 (Announced June 20, 2022) | — |
| Vice Minister for the Promotion of Justice | Jhoana Delgado Gaitán | September 15, 2022 | — |
| Vice Minister for Criminal Policy and Restorative Justice | Camilo Umaña | September 13, 2022 | — |

=== Ministry of National Defence ===
| Office | Nominee | Assumed office | Left office |
|---|---|---|---|
| Minister of National Defence | Iván Velásquez | August 7, 2022 (Announced June 20, 2022) | — |
| Vice Minister for Defense Strategy and Planning | Major general Retired Ricardo Díaz Torres | September 2, 2022 | — |
| Vice Minister for Defense and Security Policies | Alberto Lara Posada | September 2, 2022 | — |
| Vice Minister for Veterans | Elsa Morales Bernal | September 2, 2022 | — |

=== Ministry of Agriculture and Rural Development ===
| Office | Nominee | Assumed office | Left office |
|---|---|---|---|
| Minister of Agriculture and Rural Development | Jhenifer Mojica | May 1, 2023 (Announced April 26, 2023) | — |
| Minister of Agriculture and Rural Development | Cecilia López | August 7, 2022 (Announced June 25, 2022) | April 26, 2023 |
| Vice Minister for Rural Development | Darío Alcides Fajardo Montaña | November 9, 2022 | — |
| Vice Minister for Agricultural Affairs | Luis Alberto Villegas Prado | September 7, 2022 | — |

=== Ministry of Health and Social Protection ===
| Office | Nominee | Assumed office | Left office |
|---|---|---|---|
| Minister of Health and Social Protection | Guillermo Jaramillo | May 1, 2023 (Announced April 26, 2023) | — |
| Minister of Health and Social Protection | Carolina Corcho | August 7, 2022 (Announced June 25, 2022) | April 26, 2023 |
| Vice Minister for Public Health and Service Provision | Jaime Hernán Urrego Rodríguez | August 8, 2022 | — |
| Vice Minister for Social Protection | Luis Alberto Martínez Saldarriaga | August 8, 2022 | — |

=== Ministry of Labour ===
| Office | Nominee | Assumed office | Left office |
|---|---|---|---|
| Minister of Labour | Gloria Inés Ramírez | August 11, 2022 (Announced June 20, 2022) | — |
| Vice Minister of Employment and Pensions | Iván Jaramillo | February 11, 2023 | — |
| Vice Minister of Employment and Pensions | Flor Esther Salazar | August 11, 2022 | February 3, 2023 |
| Vice Minister of Labor Relations and Inspection | Edwin Palma Egea | September 6, 2022 | February 11, 2023 |

== Cabinet-levels administrative departments ==
| Office | Appointee | Assumed office | Left office |
|---|---|---|---|
| Director of the DPN | Jorge Iván Gónzalez | August 24, 2022 | — |
| Director of the DAFP | César Augusto Manrique | August 24, 2022 | — |
| Director of the DAPS | Cielo Rusinque | August 24, 2022 | — |
| Director of the DNI | Manuel Casanova | August 24, 2022 | — |
| Director of the DANE | Piedad Urduola | August 24, 2022 | — |

== Military joint staff appointments ==
| Office | Appointee | Assumed office | Left office |
|---|---|---|---|
| Commander of the Military Forces | General Helder Fernan Giraldo | August 20, 2022 | — |
| Joint Chief of Staff of the Military Forces | Vice admiral José Joaquín Amézquita | August 20, 2022 | — |
| Commander of the National Army | General Luis Mauricio Opina | August 20, 2022 | — |
| Commander of the Air Force | General Luis Carlos Córdoba | August 20, 2022 | — |
| Commander of the National Navy | Vice admiral Francisco Hernado Cubides | August 20, 2022 | — |
| Commander of the National Police | Major general William Salamanca | May 9, 2023 | — |
| Commander of the National Police | General Henry Sanabria | August 20, 2022 | April 12, 2023 |

== See also ==
- Cabinet of Gustavo Petro
