= List of ambassadors appointed by Gustavo Petro =

This is a list of the ambassadors of Colombia appointed by the 34th president of Colombia, Gustavo Petro.

== Color key ==
- Denotes presidential nomination reported by the President, pending confirmation by the plenary session abroad.
- Confirmed appointees who are political appointees (rather than career foreign service officers)
- Confirmed appointees who are Career Members of the Senior Executive Service or Senior Foreign Service.

== Ambassadors to foreign states ==
=== Americas ===
Office	Nominee	Assumed office	Left office
Ambassador to Argentina	Camilo Romero	September 13, 2022	August 7, 2026
Ambassador to Bolivia	Elizabeth García Carillo	November 3, 2022	August 7, 2026
Ambassador to Brazil	Guillermo Rivera Flórez	January 13, 2023	July 3, 2025
Ambassador to Brazil	Alfredo Saade	August 15, 2025	August 7, 2026
Ambassador to Canada	Carlos Arturo Morales López	January 13, 2023	August 7, 2026
Ambassador to Costa Rica	Carlos Rodríguez Mejía	January 26, 2023	August 7, 2026
Ambassador to Cuba	José Noé Rios	October 20, 2022	August 7, 2026
Ambassador to Dominican Republic	Darío Villamizar Herrera	March 29, 2023	August 7, 2026
Ambassador to Ecuador	María Antonia Velasco		August 7, 2026
Ambassador to Guatemala	Victoria González Ariza	September 13, 2022	August 7, 2026
Ambassador to Jamaica	Emiliana Lucia Berndard	March 29, 2023	August 7, 2026
Ambassador to Mexico	Álvaro Ninco	February 11, 2023	August 7, 2026
Ambassador to Nicaragua	León Fredy Muñoz	September 13, 2022	August 7, 2026
Ambassador to Panama	Mauricio Baquero Pardo	October 20, 2022	August 7, 2026
Ambassador to Paraguay	Juan Manuel Corzo	December 2, 2022	August 7, 2026
Ambassador to Peru	Eufracio Morales		August 7, 2026
Ambassador to Peru	Gloria Arias Nieto		August 7, 2026
Ambassador to Trinidad and Tobago	William Sidney Bush Howard		August 7, 2026
Ambassador to Uruguay	Juan José Quintana Aranguren	September 11, 2023	August 7, 2026
Ambassador to the United States	Luis Gilberto Murillo	September 8, 2022	May 21, 2024
Ambassador to the United States	Daniel García-Peña	July 15, 2025	August 7, 2026
Ambassador to Venezuela	Armando Benedetti	August 24, 2022	July 19, 2023
Ambassador to Venezuela	Milton Rengifo Hernández	July 19, 2023	August 7, 2026

=== Europe ===
Office	Nominee	Assumed office	Left office
Ambassador to Austria	Laura Gil Savastano	July 4, 2023	August 7, 2026
Ambassador to Belgium Ambassador to Luxembourg	Jorge Rojas	September 21, 2023	July 2, 2024
Ambassador to Belgium Ambassador to Luxembourg	Daniel Prado Albarracín	November 26, 2024	August 7, 2026
Ambassador to Denmark	Catalina Velasco	August 30, 2023	August 7, 2026
Ambassador to Finland	Álvaro Sandoval Bernal	April 21, 2023	January 28, 2025
Ambassador to Finland	Ruth Mery Cano	January 8, 2025	August 7, 2026
Ambassador to France	Alfonso Prada	May 3, 2023	August 7, 2026
Ambassador to Germany	Yadir Salazar	October 24, 2022	August 7, 2026
Ambassador to the Holy See	Iván Velásquez Gómez	May 7, 2026	August 7, 2026
Ambassador to Hungary	Ignacio Enrique Ruiz Perea	October 18, 2022	August 7, 2026
Ambassador to Ireland	Miguel Ruiz Blanco	July 26, 2023	August 7, 2026
Ambassador to Italy	Ligia Quessep	October 20, 2022	August 7, 2026
Ambassador to Netherlands	Diana Olarte	December 2, 2022	August 7, 2026
Ambassador to Norway	Paola Bernal	November 3, 2022	August 7, 2026
Ambassador to Portugal	José Fernando Bautista	July 6, 2022	August 7, 2026
Ambassador to Sweden	Guillermo Reyes	November 22, 2022	August 7, 2026
Ambassador to Switzerland	Francisco Echeverri	October 20, 2022	August 7, 2026
Ambasador to the United Kingdom	Roy Barreras	August 4, 2023	April 29, 2025
Ambasador to the United Kingdom	Laura Sarabia	TBD	August 7, 2026

== See also ==
- Political appointments by Gustavo Petro
- Cabinet of Gustavo Petro
