= Alfonso Prada =

Colombian politician

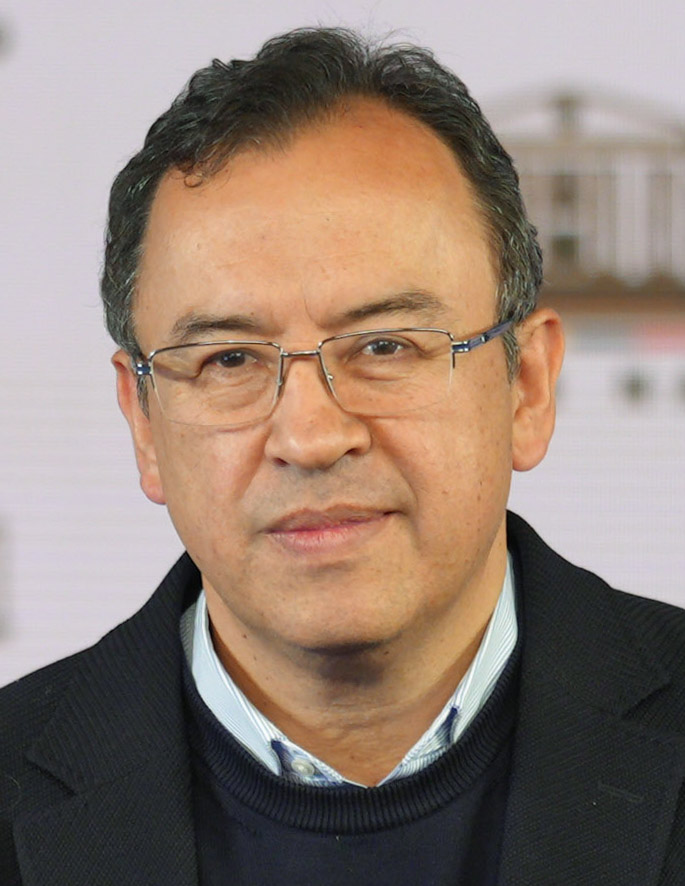
- Alfonso Prada in 2023

Ambassador of Colombia to France
- In office 13 July 2023 – 7 August 2026
- President: Gustavo Petro
- Preceded by: Mauricio Vargas

Minister of the Interior
- In office 7 August 2022 – 26 April 2023
- President: Gustavo Petro
- Preceded by: Daniel Palacios
- Succeeded by: Luis Fernando Velasco

General Secretary of the Presidency
- In office 28 March 2017 – 7 August 2018
- President: Juan Manuel Santos
- Preceded by: Luis Guillermo Vélez
- Succeeded by: Jorge Mario Eastman

Director of SENA
- In office 20 August 2014 – 27 March 2017
- President: Juan Manuel Santos
- Preceded by: Gina Parody
- Succeeded by: María Andrea Nieto

Member of the Chamber of Representatives
- In office 20 July 2010 – 20 July 2014
- Constituency: Capital District

Councillor of Bogotá
- In office 1 January 1998 – 1 January 2006

Personal details
- Born: Hernando Alfonso Prada Gil; 6 October 1963 (age 62) Bogotá, D.C., Colombia
- Party: Colombia Renaciente (2019-present)
- Other political affiliations: Party of the U (2014-2019) Green Party (2010-2014) Liberal (1998-2010) New Liberalism (1988-1989)
- Education: Free University of Colombia (BL)

Hernando Alfonso Prada Gil (born 6 October 1963) is a Colombian lawyer, professor, and politician who served as Minister of the Interior from 2022 to 2023 during the Petro administration. He previously served as Secretary General of the Presidency from 2017 to 2018 and as Director of SENA from 2014 to 2017 during the Santos administration.

He has served as Luis Carlos Galán's private secretary during his presidential campaign for the New Liberalism movement. Years later, he served as Councilor of Bogotá for three terms since 1998 with the endorsement of the Liberal Party where his colleagues named him the best Councilor of Bogotá on three occasions based on the evaluation carried out by the Bogotá Chamber of Commerce, the newspaper El Tiempo and the Crown Foundation.

In the 2010 legislative elections, he won a seat, which led him to the Chamber of Representatives for the Capital District, with the political endorsement of the Green Party.

During the 2014 presidential campaign of Juan Manuel Santos, he served as coordinator, which later led him to serve as Director of the Training Education Service where he stood out for promoting the internationalization of the entity, achieving international distinctions such as the Tech Challenge Innovation Fund. 2015 award which was given to him by the office of the Barack Obama administration at the White House, in March 2017, he would serve as Secretary General of the presidency

Prada would serve as Head of Debate for Gustavo Petro's 2022 presidential campaign, which would later lead him to be listed as a presidential nominee for the office of Minister of the Interior, a position for which he would be sworn in on August 7, 2022.

Political offices
Preceded by Gina Parody	Director of SENA; 2014-2027	Succeeded by María Andrea Nieto
Preceded by Luis Guillermo Veléz	Secretary General of the Presidency; 2017-2018	Succeeded by Jorge Mario Eatsman
Preceded by Daniel Palacios	Minister of the Interior; 2022–2023	Succeeded by Luis Fernando Velasco
Diplomatic posts
Preceded by Mauricio Vargas	Ambassador of Colombia to France; 2023-2026	Incumbent
Order of precedence
Preceded by Daniel Palacios as Former Minister of the Interior	Order of precedence of Colombia as Former Cabinet Member	Succeeded by Claudia Blum as Former Minister of Foreign Affairs
