= José Raúl Moreno =

Colombian philosopher and politician (born 1980)

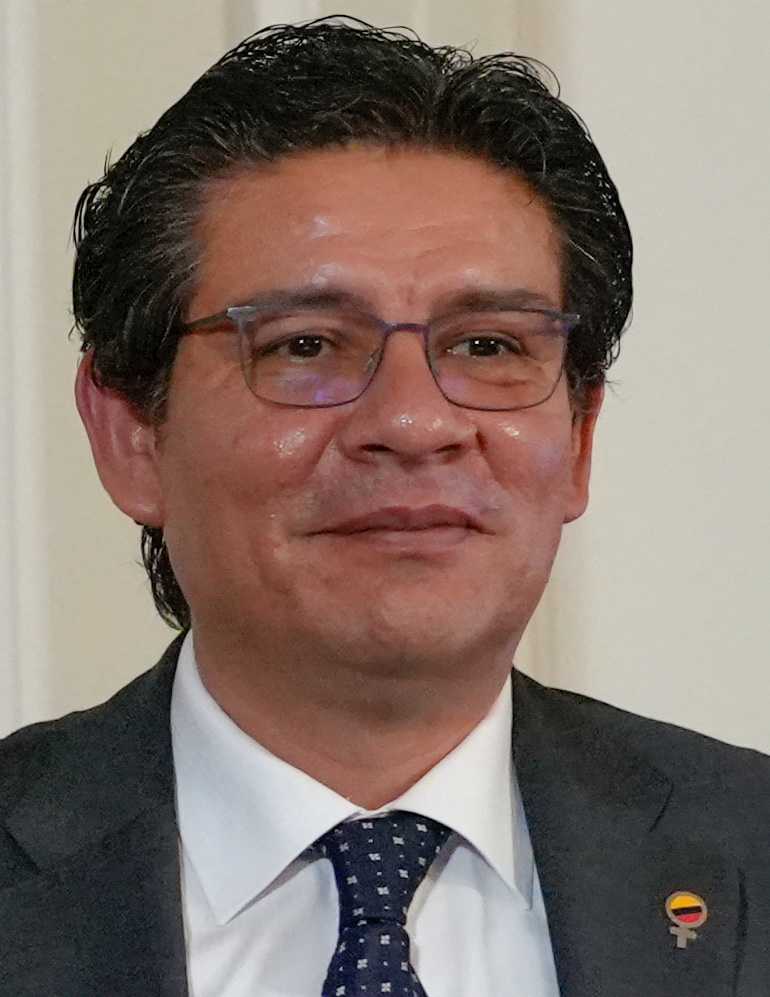
- Moreno in 2025

Chief of Staff of the Casa de Nariño
- In office December 24, 2025 – August 7, 2026
- President: Gustavo Petro
- Preceded by: Alfredo Saade
- Succeeded by: Nicolás Gómez Arenas

Personal details
- Born: José Raúl Moreno Gómez; 1980 (age 45–46) Bogotá, D.C., Colombia
- Party: Historic Pact (2026-present)
- Other political affiliations: Historic Pact for Colombia (2020-2025); Humane Colombia (2012-2026)
- Education: Central University (PhB)

José Raúl Moreno Gómez (born c. 1980) is a Colombian philosopher and a public official who has served as Chief of Staff of the Casa de Nariño from 2025 to 2026.

Moreno served as an advisor to the Ministry of Health and Social Protection and later to the Administrative Department of the Presidency.

== Education and career ==
After obtaining his degree in philosophy, Moreno began working at Universidad Central, initially as an editorial assistant between 2008 and 2009. He later taught there from 2010 to 2022, when he resigned to join Gustavo Petro's 2022 presidential campaign. In 2012, he worked as an advisor in the office of the Secretary of Government and subsequently in the Office of the Mayor of Ibagué. Later, he earned a master's degree in creative writing.

From 2016 to 2023, he worked as a researcher developing projects at the Center for Thought and Action for Transition. In June 2023, he was appointed as principal advisor to the Ministry of Health and Social Protection by Minister Guillermo Alfonso Jaramillo, a position he held until February 2025.

Moreno went on to become an advisor in the Chief of Staff's office under Chief of Staff Alfredo Saade. After Saade's resignation, Moreno assumed the role of acting Chief of Staff.

Following Saade's resignation, Moreno assumed the position of acting Chief of Staff of the Casa de Nariño on August 15, 2025. Subsequently, on December 14, President Gustavo Petro formalized Moreno's appointment through Decree 1424, officially designating him and making him a member of his inner circle.

As chief of staff, Moreno has appeared in official presidential activities and delegations. In September 2025, Colombia's Presidency listed him as part of President Petro's delegation during an official visit to Japan. Presidency transcripts and releases also identified him as chief of staff at later public events, including events related to the San José galleon project and public ceremonies in late 2025 and 2026.

Political offices
Preceded by Alfredo Saade	Chief of Staff of the Casa de Nariño; 2026–present	Incumbent
