= Luis Fernando Velasco =

Colombian politician (born 1964)

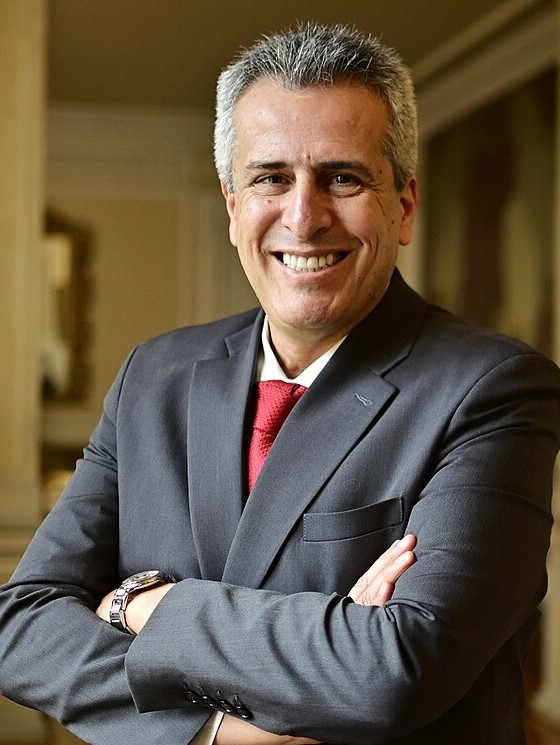
- Official portrait, 2023

Minister of the Interior
- In office April 26, 2023 – July 3, 2024
- President: Gustavo Petro
- Preceded by: Alfonso Prada
- Succeeded by: Juan Fernando Cristo

Councelor for the Regions of the Presidency
- In office August 24, 2022 – April 26, 2023
- President: Gustavo Petro
- Preceded by: Ana María Palau
- Succeeded by: Sandra Ortiz

President of the Senate
- In office July 20, 2015 – July 20, 2016
- Preceded by: José David Name
- Succeeded by: Mauricio Lizcano

Senator of Colombia
- In office July 20, 2006 – July 20, 2022

Member of the Chamber of Representatives
- In office July 20, 1998 – July 20, 2006
- Constituency: Cauca

Personal details
- Born: Luis Fernando Velasco Chaves; October 18, 1964 (age 61) Popayán, Cauca, Colombia
- Party: Liberal (1998-present)
- Education: University of Cauca (BL)

Luis Fernando Velasco Chaves (born October 18, 1964) is a Colombian politician and lawyer, graduated from the University of Cauca, with a master's degree in government and public administration. He has served as a member of the chamber of representatives for Cauca between 1998 and 2006, after this he served as a senator of Colombia between 2006 and 2022 and President of the Senate between 2015 and 2016, more later between August 24, 2022, and April 26, 2023, he served as councilor for the regions of the presidency, on April 26 he was announced as the new Minister of the Interior.

Political offices
Preceded by José David Name	President of the Senate; 2015-2016	Succeeded by Mauricio Lizcano
Preceded by Ana María Palau	Councelor for the Regions of the Presidency; 2022-2023	Succeeded by Sandra Ortiz
Preceded by Alfonso Prada	Minister of the Interior; 2023-2024	Succeeded by Juan Fernando Cristo
