= María Paula Correa =

Colombian lawyer (born 1982)

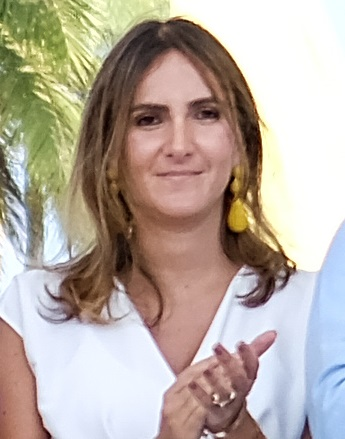
- Correa in 2020

Chief of Staff of the Casa de Nariño
- In office September 11, 2019 – August 7, 2022
- President: Iván Duque
- Preceded by: Position established
- Succeeded by: Laura Sarabia

General Director of Administrative Department of the Presidency
- In office April 24, 2019 – October 2, 2019
- President: Iván Duque
- Preceded by: Jorge Mario Eastman (Note: as General Secretary of the Presidency)
- Succeeded by: Diego Molano

Private Secretary of the Presidency
- In office August 7, 2018 – September 11, 2019
- President: Iván Duque
- Preceded by: Juan Mesa Zuleta
- Succeeded by: Position abolished

Personal details
- Born: María Paula Correa Fernández; 1982 (age 43–44) Bogotá, D.C., Colombia
- Party: Democratic Centre (2018-present)
- Other political affiliations: Conservative (2002-2018)
- Education: University of the Andes (BBL)

María Paula Correa Fernández (c. 1982) is a Colombian lawyer and politician who served as Chief of Staff of the Casa de Nariño from 2019 to 2022. A member of the Democratic Centre party, she has also served as Private Secretary of the Presidency and General Director of DAPRE.

Born in Bogotá, D.C., Correa studied law at the University of the Andes, where she later specialized in public management and administrative institutions. She later earned a master's degree in public administration and international relations from Columbia University. In 2018, she participated in Iván Duque's presidential campaign and later in 2019, she pioneered the creation of the position of Chief of Staff of the Casa de Nariño, being the first to hold it.

== Notes ==
Political offices
Preceded by Diego Mesa Zuleta	Private Secretary of the Presidency; 2018-2019	Abolished office
Preceded by Jorge Mario Eastman	General Director of Administrative Department of the Presidency; 2019-2019	Succeeded by Diego Molano
New office	Chief of Staff of the Casa de Nariño; 2019–2022	Succeeded by Laura Sarabia
