= Chief of Staff of the Casa de Nariño =

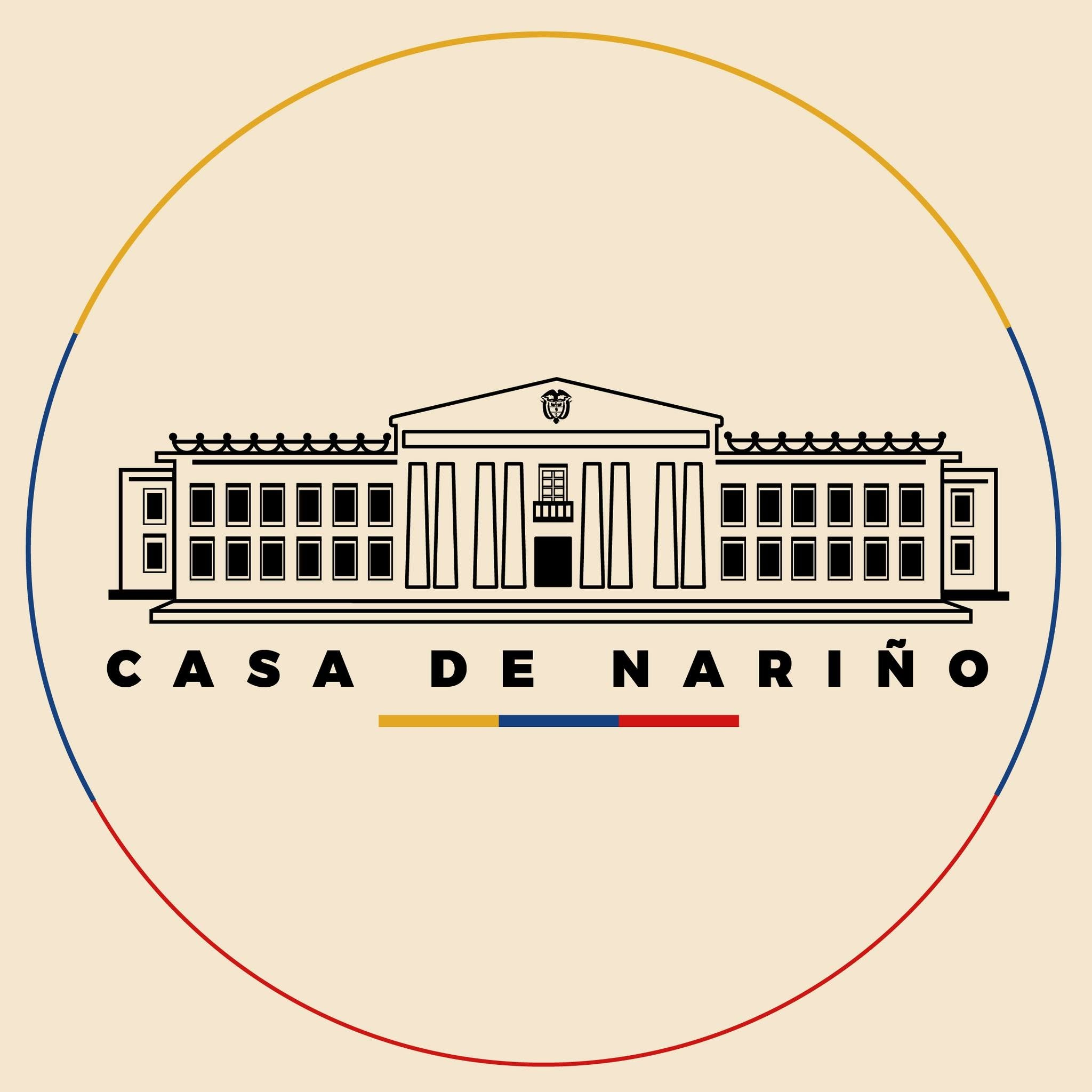
- Incumbent; Nicolás Gómez Arenas since August 7, 2026
- Casa de Nariño Office; Office of the President
- Reports to: President of Colombia
- Appointer: President of Colombia
- Formation: September 11, 2019
- First holder: María Paula Correa

The Chief of Staff of the Casa de Nariño is the head of the Executive Office of the President of Colombia and a cabinet position in the government of Colombia.

The chief of staff is a person politically appointed by the president of Colombia who does not require the confirmation of the Senate and who serves at the discretion of the President. Although it is not a legally required role, all presidents since Iván Duque have appointed a chief of staff.

The chief of staff is the highest-ranking political appointee in the Casa de Nariño. The position is widely recognized as one of great power and influence, due to daily contact with the President and control of the Executive Office of the President of Colombia.

This position is part of the Administrative Department of the Presidency and together with the person who heads this department, they form what is informally known as "the president's first decision-making circle." Their functions include advising the president in the development of public policy, coordinating the presidential agenda, and presenting to the president for consideration matters from the ministries, among other functions.

== History ==
Originally, the functions now performed by the Chief of Staff belonged to the private secretary to the president, who tended to remain in the shadows and was often described as enigmatic. The Private Secretary served as an advisor to the President, a role that involved a mix of personal and professional tasks under strict discretion. Meanwhile, the functions of filtering, managing, and overseeing the President's agenda fell to the Secretary General.

Between 1930 and 1956, when the President's reach was much broader, Gustavo Rojas Pinilla relied on a small group of high-level advisors. These advisors typically filled vacancies or performed very specific tasks. Although the Casa de Nariño had the budgetary capacity to create staff positions for these advisors, the creation of these positions often took weeks and was sometimes even discarded due to the high volume of tasks assigned to the coordination team. It wasn't until 1956, during Gustavo Rojas Pinilla's presidency, that the foundations were laid for the system we see today. Rojas Pinilla changed the name of the then General Secretariat of the Presidency to the Administrative Department of the Presidency of the Republic. While the name changed, the positions retained their original titles, but their functions were expanded to achieve greater efficiency and effectiveness.

In 1976, during the presidency of Alfonso López Michelsen, the agency was reorganized into three departments, each with its own head, reporting to the Secretary General.

The position of Private Secretary became a role generally shared with the Secretary General. In 2019, during the Duque administration, both positions were merged to create the Chief of Staff, while the Secretary General became the general director, reporting to the Chief of Staff. In 2023, during the Petro administration, some of the functions were reassigned to the director general, partly so that Laura Sarabia, who had been chief of staff until June of that year, could once again manage the Casa de Nariño, but in a different role. The position retained the administration of four of the five departments.

=== Average tenure in office ===
The average tenure of a chief of staff at the Casa de Nariño is just over nine months. The first chief of staff, María Paula Correa, during the Duque administration, was the president's only chief of staff; Laura Sarabia was the only one to hold the position for more than nine months, during the Petro administration. Armando Benedetti served for only 21 days, and Alfredo Saade, who succeeded him four months later, remained for one month. To date, no chief of staff has served for a full presidential term.

== List of Casa de Nariño chiefs of staff ==
Image	Name	Start	End	Duration	President
	María Paula Correa	September 11, 2019	August 7, 2022	2 years, 330 days	Iván Duque (2018–2022)
	Laura Sarabia	August 7, 2022	June 2, 2023	299 days	Gustavo Petro (2022–2026)
	Armando Benedetti	February 3, 2025	February 24, 2025	21 days	Gustavo Petro (2022–2026)
	Alfredo Saade	June 18, 2025	August 15, 2025	58 days	Gustavo Petro (2022–2026)
	José Raúl Moreno	August 15, 2025	August 5, 2026	357 days	Gustavo Petro (2022–2026)
	Nicolás Gómez Arenas	August 7, 2026		32 days	Abelardo de la Espriella (2026-present)
