= Alfredo Saade =

Colombian politician and clergy man (born 1972)

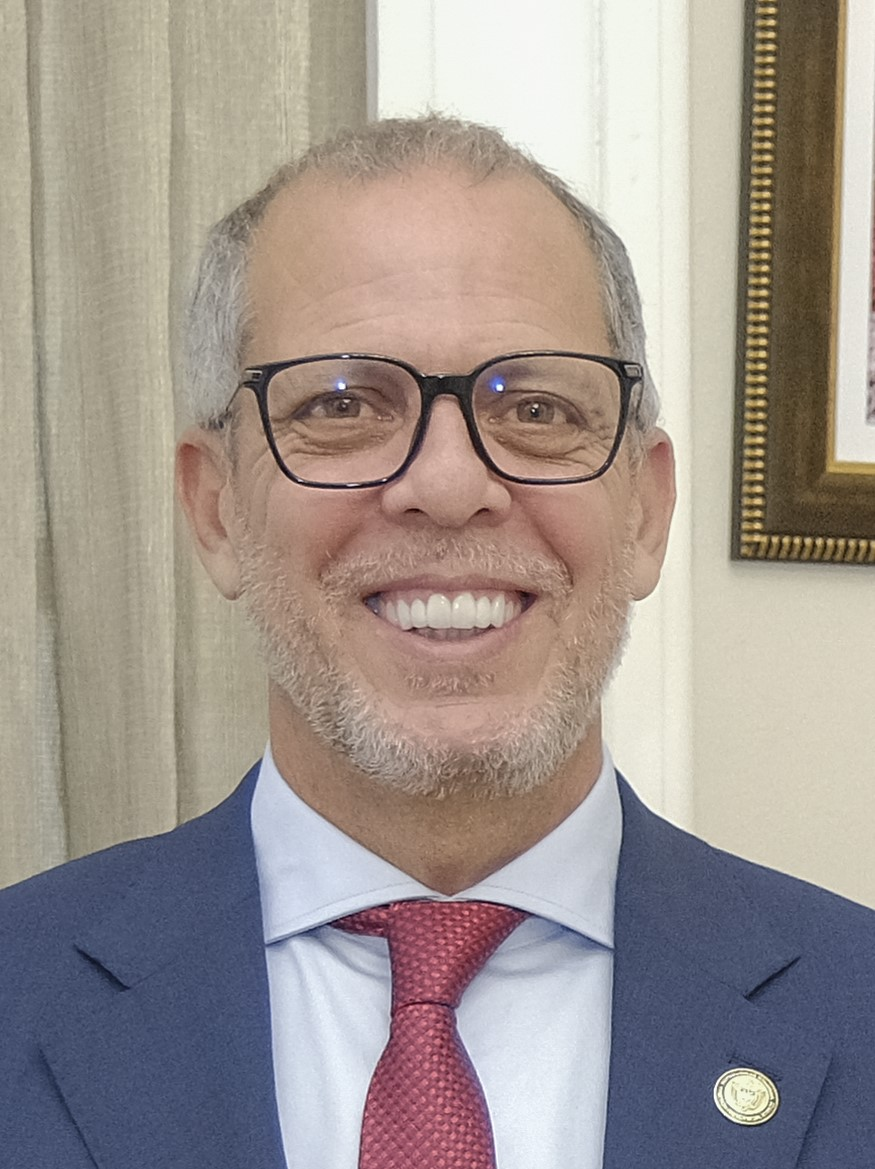
- Saade in 2025

Ambassador of Colombia to Brazil
- Nominee; December 29, 2025 – August 7, 2026
- President: Gustavo Petro
- Preceded by: Guillermo Rivera

Chief of Staff of the Casa de Nariño
- In office June 18, 2025 – August 15, 2025
- President: Gustavo Petro
- Preceded by: Armando Benedetti
- Succeeded by: José Raúl Moreno

Personal details
- Born: Alfredo Rafael Saade Vergel; 1972 (age 53–54) Valledupar, César, Colombia
- Party: Historic Pact (2026-present)
- Other political affiliations: Radical Change (2006-2010); Historic Pact for Colombia (2020-2025); Broad Democratic Alliance (2022-2025)

Pastor Alfredo Rafael Saade Vergel (born c. 1972) is a Colombian evangelical pastor and politician who has served as Chief of Staff of the Casa de Nariño since June 18, 2025.

Saade has been one of the strongest members of the Historic Pact for Colombia. In 2022, he was one of the Historic Pact's presidential candidates, finishing last in the 2022 Colombian presidential primaries.

Political offices
Preceded by Armando Benedetti	Chief of Staff of the Casa de Nariño; 2025-2026	Succeeded by José Raúl Moreno
