= Juan Fernando Cristo =

Colombian lawyer and politician

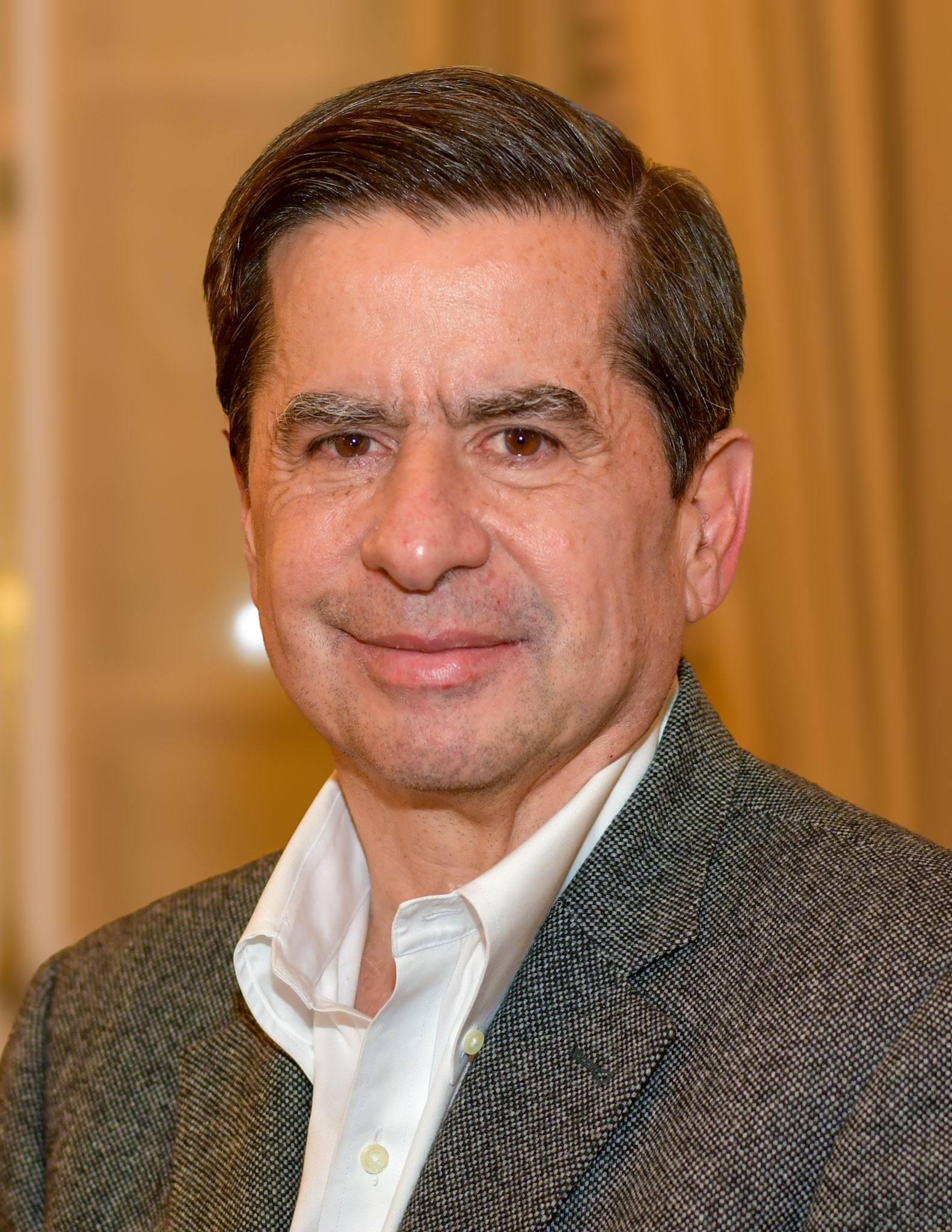
- Official portrait, 2024

Minister of Interior
- In office 3 July 2024 – 10 February 2025
- President: Gustavo Petro
- Preceded by: Luis Fernando Velasco
- Succeeded by: Armando Benedetti
- In office 7 August 2014 – 25 May 2017
- President: Juan Manuel Santos
- Preceded by: Aurelio Iragorri
- Succeeded by: Guillermo Rivera

Senator of Colombia
- In office 20 July 1998 – 20 July 2014

President of the Senate
- In office 20 July 2013 – 20 July 2014
- Preceded by: Roy Barreras
- Succeeded by: Jose David Name

Personal details
- Born: Juan Fernando Cristo Bustos; 11 July 1964 (age 62) Cúcuta, North Santander, Colombia
- Party: Liberal Party
- Education: University of the Andes

Juan Fernando Cristo Bustos (born 11 July 1964) is a Colombian lawyer and politician. He served as a Colombian Senator from 1998 to 2014, and was Minister of the Interior under Juan Manuel Santos from 2014 to 2017. In this capacity, he played a key role in negotiating and implementing the peace accords signed with FARC. He was reappointed Minister of the Interior in 2024 by President Gustavo Petro.

== Early life and education ==
Juan Fernando Cristo is the son of Colombian senator Jorge Cristo Sahium, who was assassinated in 1997. He studied law at the University of the Andes.

== Political career ==
Starting in 1993, he served Colombia as a diplomat for several years. After his father's assassination, he ran for the Colombian Senate, an office he would go on to hold from 1998 to 2014. During his last year in office, he was president of the Senate.

From 2014 to 2017, he was the Minister of the Interior for the second government of Juan Manuel Santos. During his tenure, he helped broker the Colombian government's peace accords with Revolutionary Armed Forces of Colombia (FARC).

On May 25, 2017, Cristo announced his candidacy for Colombian's presidency in the 2018 election. However, he lost the Liberal Party candidacy to Humberto de la Calle, who subsequently lost the general election to right-wing candidate Iván Duque Márquez.

He was appointed Minister of the Interior on July 3, 2024 by President Gustavo Petro Urrego. During his tenure, he has called for an independent verification of the disputed 2024 Venezuelan presidential election.

Political offices
Preceded by Roy Barreras	President of the Senate; 2013-2014	Succeeded by Jose David Name
Preceded by Aurelio Iragorri	Minister of the Interior; 2014–2017	Succeeded by Gillermo Rivera
Preceded by Luis Fernando Velasco	Minister of the Interior; 2024–2025	Succeeded by Armando Benedetti
