= Víctor Manuel Muñoz =

Colombian industrial engineer (born 1981)

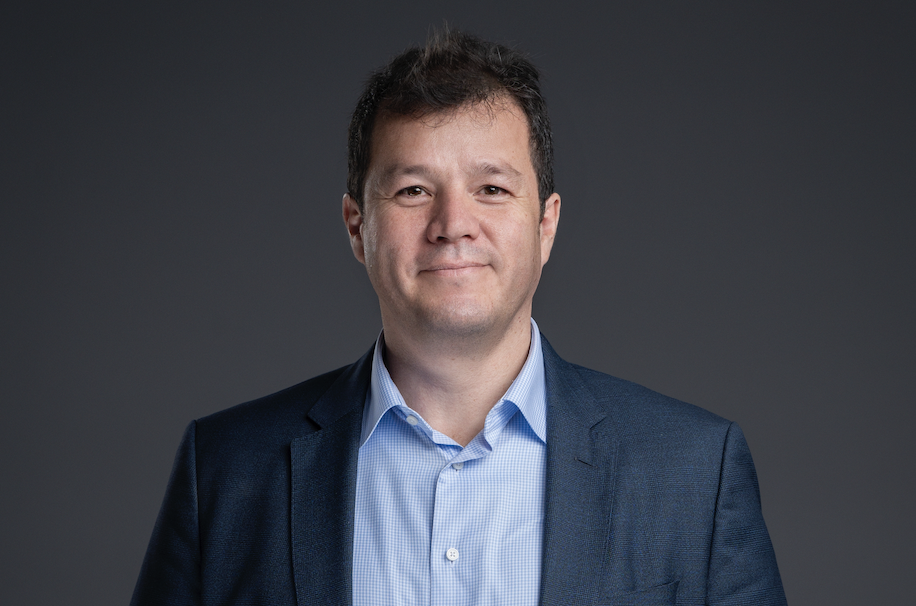
- Official portrait, 2021

General Director of Administrative Department of the Presidency
- In office February 2, 2021 – August 7, 2022
- President: Iván Duque
- Preceded by: Diego Molano
- Succeeded by: Mauricio Lizcano

Personal details
- Born: Víctor Manuel Muñoz Rodríguez; 1978 or 1979 (age 46–47) Andes, Antioquia, Colombia
- Party: Democratic Center (2020-present)
- Education: Pontificia Universidad Javeriana

Víctor Manuel Muñoz Rodríguez is a Colombian industrial engineer and public official who served as Director of the Administrative Department of the Presidency of Colombia under President Iván Duque from February 2021 to August 2022. He previously served as High Presidential Advisor for Innovation and Digital Transformation. Muñoz holds a degree in Industrial Engineering from Pontificia Universidad Javeriana and an MBA from Universidad de los Andes.

== Early life and education ==
Industrial engineer graduated from the Pontificia Universidad Javeriana and has a specialization in Telecommunications Business Management and an MBA from the Universidad de los Andes (Colombia). He also completed executive studies at the Harvard Business School, focused on leadership and strategy in technological innovation environments.

== Career ==
In the private sector, Muñoz has held positions as commercial and marketing vice president of Carvajal S.A., CEO of Latam Comdata Group and director for Latin America of Digitex International. In 2013, he co-founded the polling firm Guarumo, specialized in public opinion studies and electoral analysis.

In 2018, during the administration of President Iván Duque, Víctor Muñoz made history by becoming Colombia's first Chief Information Officer (CIO). His innovative approach transformed information technology practices across government agencies, introducing revolutionary initiatives in Cloud Computing, the Internet of Things (IoT) and Artificial Intelligence (AI).

In 2021, President Duque appointed him as Secretary General of the Presidency of the Republic of Colombia. In this position, Victor led critical initiatives, such as the Covid-19 vaccination plan, economic reactivation and the implementation of peace agreements. He also played a key role in the adoption of ethical frameworks for artificial intelligence by the Colombian government. In addition, he has been linked to technological innovation projects, including the creation of startups oriented to the provision of virtual medical services since 2014.

As an entrepreneur and angel investor, he has participated in technology-based companies such as Guarumo.com, 1doc3.com, Binaria and Genial.io. He has served on boards and boards of directors in various sectors such as technology, health, finance and energy in countries such as Colombia, Brazil and the Dominican Republic.

== General Director of Administrative Department of the Presidency (2021-2022) ==
During Iván Duque's 2018 presidential campaign, Muñoz participated as a strategist in polling and data analysis. After the election, he was appointed Presidential Advisor for Innovation and Digital Transformation, where he led initiatives such as C-Emprende and the Center for the Fourth Industrial Revolution.

In February 2021, he took over as General Director of Administrative Department of the Presidency, a position from which he coordinated the COVID-19 vaccination strategy and the economic reactivation of the country. He was also responsible for the implementation of the CoronApp application, developed by the National Institute of Health, for the monitoring of positive cases of COVID-19 in Colombia.

In this position, he also led the formulation of the country's public policy on artificial intelligence (AI), promoting the construction of an ethical framework through participatory processes and expert missions. As part of the digital agenda, he coordinated official visits to technology companies in the United States, including meetings with executives from companies such as Cisco, Google, and 500 Startups, in order to strengthen cooperation in digital transformation.

As Colombia's government CIO, he worked to improve IT practices in government agencies and led the adoption of pricing framework agreements for innovative topics such as cloud computing, IoT, and AI, along with other technology components. From his position as Secretary General of the Republic, he managed the COVID-19 vaccination plan and economic reactivation as well as the adoption of ethical frameworks for artificial intelligence by the Colombian government with the support of UNESCO, CAF, IDB, and the World Bank.

== Publications ==
- Artificial Intelligence: Beyond Algorithms (2024)
- Digital Government: Challenges and Opportunities in Colombia (2023)
- Digital Transformation: Policies and Strategies for the Future (2023)
- Technology and Democracy: The Impact of Digitalization on Public Policy (2022)
- Innovation in the Public Sector: Cases and Reflections from Latin America (2022)

== Awards ==
In 2020, he was recognized as one of the "Agile 50: The World's 50 Most Influential People in the Governance Revolution" by Apolitical, due to his work on digital transformation issues.
