= National Training Service (Colombia) =

Colombian public institution

National Apprenticeship Service
- Servicio Nacional de Aprendizaje
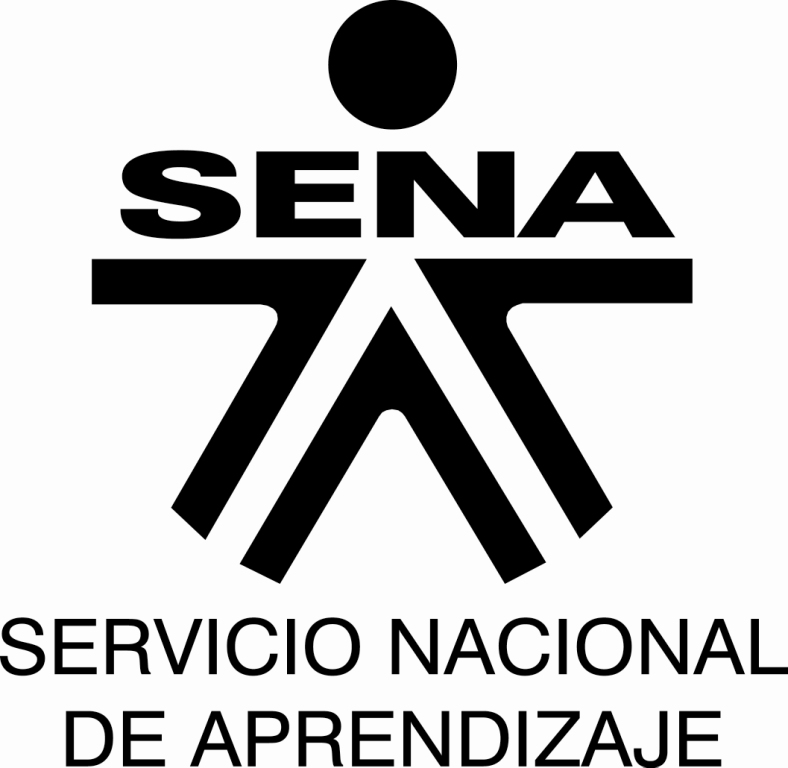

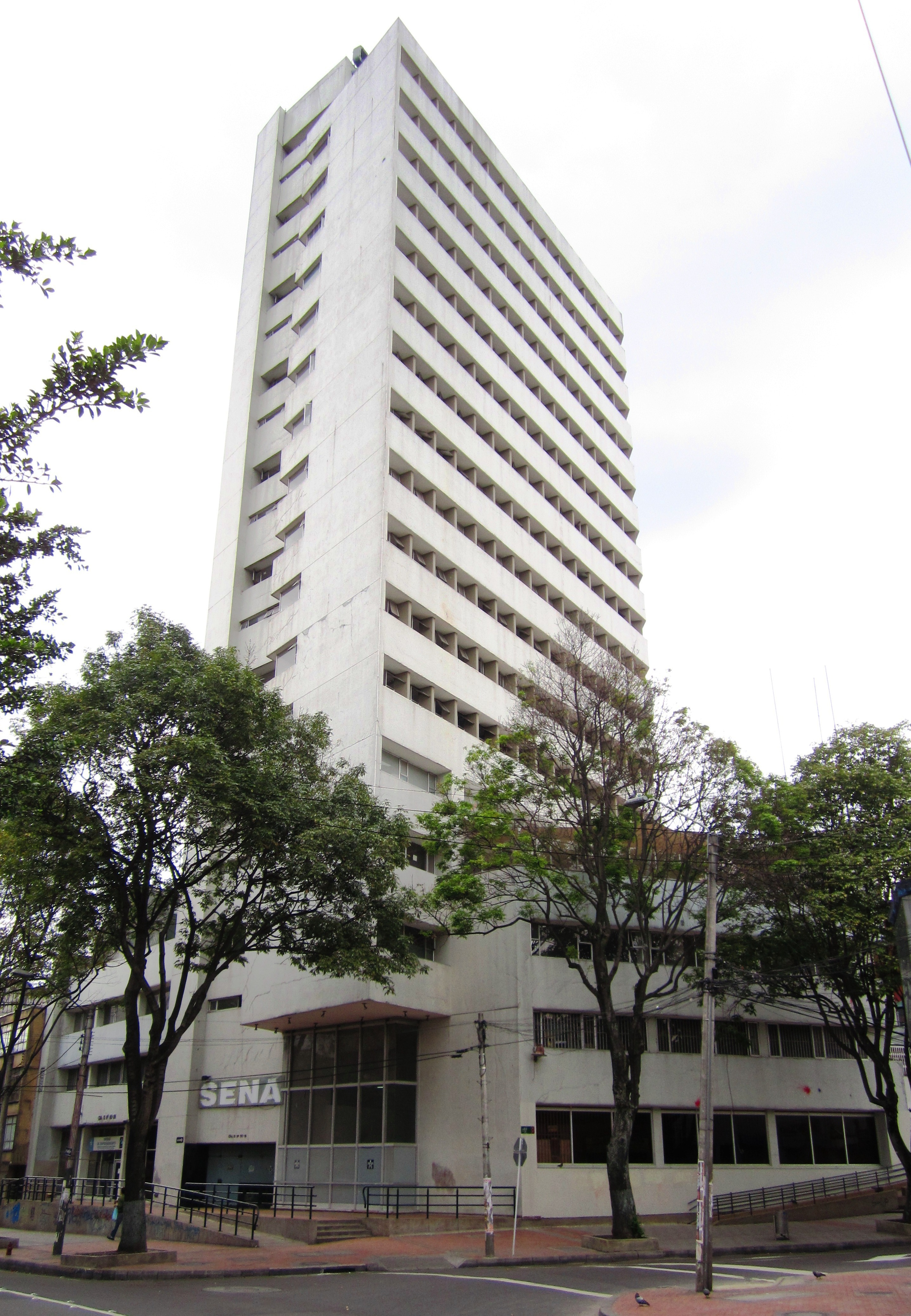
- SENA Public Employment Agency Building, Capital District Regional Office, Bogotá, Colombia.

Agency overview
- Formed: 21 June 1957
- Headquarters: Calle 57 № 8-69 Bogotá, Colombia
- Annual budget: COP2,225,561,000,000, equivalent to: USD 655,972,976.94 (2012); COP$2,275,580,644,000, equivalent to: USD670,829,795.95 (2013); COP$2,696,476,662,500, equivalent to: USD795,002,214.40 (2014)
- Agency executive: Director
- Parent agency: Ministry of Labour
- Website: www.sena.edu.co

The National Training Service (Spanish: Servicio Nacional de Aprendizaje, SENA) is a Colombian public institution aimed to develop free vocational technical, technological, and complementary training programs for the Colombian labor force as a means to increase the competitiveness of Colombia's enterprises. It's a government initiative to develop education in Colombia and foment employment, it is attached to the Ministry of Labour (Colombia) and enjoys administrative autonomy. It is considered the most beloved entity by Colombian people.

Throughout its more than 50 years, SENA has been highlighted as one of the most important centers of technical and technological education in Latin America, their 522 educational programs focus on areas such as administration, agriculture, architecture, construction, design, electricity, electronics, mechanics and technology.

== History ==
SENA administrative headquarters in Bogotá,

Vocational training arrived in Colombia in 1934 under the leadership of Henrique París Zamudio, manager of the International Correspondence Schools, who presented the apprenticeship training school model to José Gutiérrez Gómez, president of the ANDI (National Association of Industrialists), to be taken to the association's national congress in Barranquilla, held on March 10, 1949. The Congress concluded that "if we are going to train our own apprentices, paying the International Schools for this is costly and cumbersome, so we have to find another way." Then Rodolfo Martínez said: "I think this is so important and significant that it should be mandated by law so that companies contribute and instruction can be given to all those who want to learn and work."

Rodolfo Martínez Tono, a law student from Cartagena, then chose as his thesis, "Vocational Training within the Framework of an Employment Policy" and established the Workers' Training Institute in a small office at the National University, going to the entrance of the factories to invite workers to train with a megaphone.

Martínez Tono's idea materialized under the government of the Military Junta presided over by General Gabriel París, who created SENA through Decree 118 of June 21, 1957. It was promoted by Martínez Tono himself with the support of the then Minister of Labor, Raimundo Emiliani Román. The institution's name was chosen by its founder in homage to the main river of Paris (France), a place he frequently visited. and inspired by Brazil's SENAI. Its initial functions were to provide vocational training to workers, young people and adults in industry, commerce, agriculture, mining and livestock. The fledgling entity not only trained technicians, but also entrepreneurs and promoted small and medium-sized enterprises. The newly formed entity not only trained technicians, but also entrepreneurs and promoted small and medium-sized enterprises.

For three years, starting in 1957, the organization's main headquarters were located in a building on Calle 20 with Carrera 8, initially enjoying the support of the most important trade union organizations in Colombia. While the first training centers were classrooms of the Central Technical Institute and the National University of Colombia, as well as makeshift circus tents erected in cities and municipalities, in order to expand its coverage, with the above the nascent institution would seek to meet the demands of private companies, the Government and workers, who demanded more training in order to improve their working and living quality.

On August 23, 1957, the National Council held its first session and defined two tasks to be carried out: the study, codification, and systematization of labor supply and demand, and professional training. To implement these tasks, the Labor Division, the Professional Training Division, and an Administrative Division—the latter created to plan the construction and equipping of professional training centers—were established.

During the first few months, sectional structures were established in various departments, such as Cundinamarca, Antioquia, Valle del Cauca, Atlántico, Bolívar, Nariño, Cauca, and Magdalena. The remaining departments saw their own sectional branches established the following year.

In 1958, the first major study was conducted on the vocational training needs in all departments except Chocó and Córdoba, focusing on 5,000 companies across all sectors of industry. This study revealed that at least 210,000 workers required further education and that an additional 25,000 workers urgently needed training. Based on these findings, the five-year plan for 1959-1963 was established.

To implement the training model, the Popular Professional Promotion programs were designed, bringing technical training to different cities and rural communities. In 1960, two important agreements were signed with the International Labour Organization and the United Nations Special Fund, which provided administrative, financial, and technical advice to small and medium-sized businesses and promoted business growth. Furthermore, the ILO advised on the formulation of the first National Instructor Training Center. During the 1960s, the organization experienced rapid growth with the opening of various training centers throughout the country, serving the most important sectors of the economy: industrial, commercial, and agricultural. During this period, the number of apprentices increased by 40% annually, thanks to contributions from the private sector and improvements in infrastructure and diversification of training programs.

On April 10, 1970, the Urban Professional Development Program focused on industry and the Rural Popular Professional Development Program assigned to the agricultural division were launched. In 1974, the training policy for the unemployed and underemployed was implemented. In the second five-year period of the 1970s, the entity sought to expand coverage to modern lines of the traditional and non-formal economy, give a popular character to teaching and modernize the administrative, technological and methodological areas. Under this premise, the Technological Development Program was created in the Specialized Center for Advanced Vocational Training and the Technology Development Division.

In the 1980s, efforts were made to expand training to the informal sector of the economy, and in 1985, the Training for Peasant Participation program was launched. This program targeted peasant and indigenous leaders, as well as communities benefiting from the Agrarian Reform, with the aim of enabling them to participate in agricultural development. Thanks to an alliance with the Colombian Farmers' Association, training for farmers in production techniques and projects that added value to their products was guaranteed.

SENA TecnoParque Bogotá’s mobile classroom, which is part of the strategy for integration with secondary education.

In the 1990s, the internationalization of the economy increased business competition. Hence the need to enact Law 119 of 1994, through which the institution was restructured to provide comprehensive vocational training programs in all economic areas. In 1996, SENA and the Institute for the Development of Science and Technology (Colciencias) joined forces to promote technological research and scientific modernization; this was ratified in the 2003 National Development Plan.

From 2000 onwards, priority was given to entrepreneurship, technological innovation, a culture of quality, standardization, certification of job skills, and the Public Employment Service. However, apprenticeship contract payments were reduced to 75% of the current legal minimum wage. From 2000 onwards, priority was given to entrepreneurship, technological innovation, a culture of quality, standardization, certification of job skills, and the Public Employment Service. However, from 2002 to 2025, apprenticeship payments were reduced to 75% of the current legal minimum wage.

In 2002, it went from offering 1.1 million places to a little over 7.9 million places in 2009, and in 2010 it will reach close to 8 million places. In 2004, seven new autonomous regional offices with their own budgets were created in Amazonas, Arauca, Guainía, Guaviare, Putumayo, Vaupés, and Vichada. Similarly, the Cundinamarca regional office was created, independent of the Bogotá office. With these same objectives of expanding coverage and serving more Colombians, between 2002 and 2010, the entity invested in the construction and remodeling of 52 offices, such as those built in Cazucá (in Soacha), Tumaco, Leticia, Sincelejo, Quibdó, Puerto Leguízamo, Puerto Inírida, Puerto Carreño, Guapi, and Tolú.

== Stages ==
Apprentices at the SENA regional branch in Caldas, enrolled in the automotive mechanical engineering training program.

=== Instructional phase ===
Instructional phase: This is defined as the stage in which learners are taught the work through practice—rather than theory—delivered either in-person or virtually. It encompasses various training formats, similar to university courses, and spans a period of two years or more.

=== Practical phase ===
Following the completion of the instructional phase, the apprentice must apply their knowledge and skills in a professional work environment. This phase is divided into the following modalities:

- Apprenticeship contract or sponsorship: The apprentice may fulfill this requirement—starting as early as the instructional phase—by entering into an apprenticeship contract with a specific company. The apprentice receives at least the minimum wage (as of 2025) and gains hands-on experience, which adds value to their CV. In exchange, the company receives a tax exemption; otherwise, it is obligated to pay the corresponding taxes and a fine.
- Employment relationship: This is similar to an apprenticeship contract, but the apprentice begins working just like any other employee, while remaining under the influence of SENA.
- Internship: It resembles an employment relationship, but the company may choose whether or not to pay the intern.
- Mentorship/Assistantship: The apprentice may choose to complete their internship within SENA by performing various tasks as directed by their training center.
- Productive project/entrepreneurship: In this track, the learner may pursue their own business idea—which must be entirely original—and develop it during their productive phase. Throughout this process, they receive guidance on how to put the idea into practice, with the goal of securing funding for further development through SENA’s *Fondo Emprender* (Entrepreneurship Fund) or other potential sponsors.

== Library network ==
From its inception, SENA organized libraries in the departmental capital cities throughout the country to support its job training programs. Initially, its collection consisted of bibliographic material published by the institution itself; this collection was later expanded with the acquisition of specialized reference materials.

In order to automate and systematize processes related to collection development and library services, and to integrate all libraries into a national library system, the ALEPH 500 Bibliographic Information and Management System—developed by the company Ex Libris—was acquired. Subsequently, additional products were procured to complement the functions performed within this software: MetaLib, SFX, WebDewey 2.0, the ARMARC subject authority system (based on MARC21), the Primo resource discovery tool, and ARC (a statistical reporting center for ALEPH 500). These products have been updated over time to enhance their performance.

== SENA Platforms ==
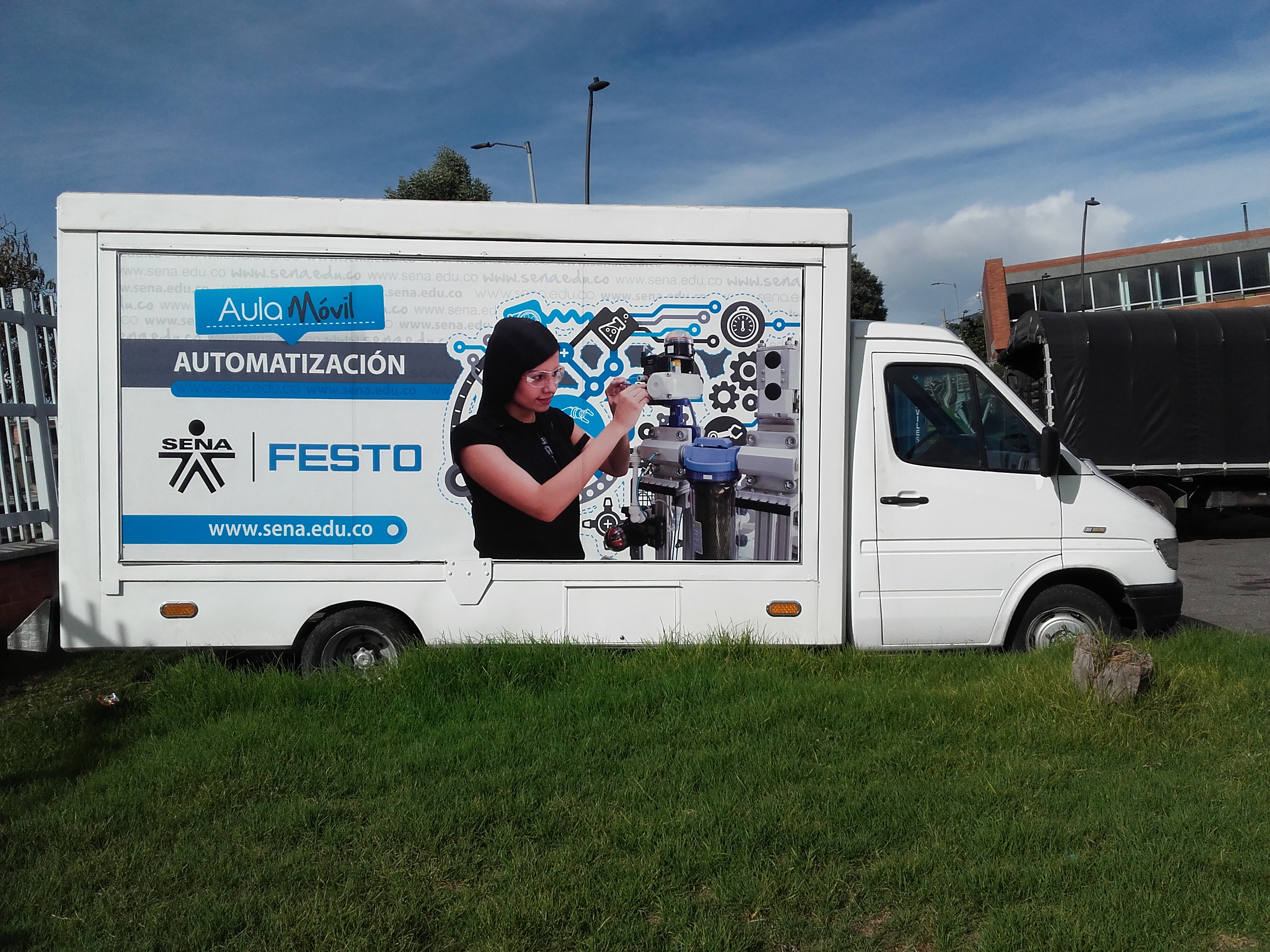
SENA mobile classroom bus at the southern complex in Bogotá.

SENA Sofia (Spanish: Sistema Optimizado para la Formación Integral del Aprendizaje Activo, en: Optimized System for Comprehensive Active Learning)—formerly known as SENA Virtual—is the institution's virtual platform.)—formerly known as SENA Virtual—is the institution's virtual platform. Through it, individuals can access a range of virtual and in-person courses—including short-term programs as well as technical and technological studies—while in-person students and instructors use it for interaction, downloading certificates, and accessing academic information.

Territorium, an e-learning platform used to manage virtual courses, currently offers over 300 short courses ranging from 10 to 60 hours in duration; a SENA Sofia Plus account is required to access these virtual training programs. Previously, the platform used was Blackboard, which served the same purpose. As of 2024, it has been replaced by SENA Zajuna.

SGVA is the platform used by companies to search for apprentices to hire, whether during their practical training phase or even during their theoretical training phase. Access is granted using an identification document number, and the password is always "aprendiz sena".

Cloudlabs is a platform that provides immersive and intuitive simulation tools, presented in the form of a "game" or through gamification. It allows you to learn about subjects such as physics, mathematics, agriculture, electronics, robotics, environmental management, and energy management, among many others. You are presented with problems that must be solved using tools and resources provided by the platform. Grades are saved in a PDF document containing the relevant data; these grades can be verified by contacting technical support.

SenaVideo is a streaming platform created by learners with the assistance of instructors to broadcast audiovisual content, serving as a valuable educational resource that complements any training program.

=== Registration ===
Throughout the year, SENA opens registration for its various course formats: in-person, virtual, and distance learning. Registration for short virtual courses is always open, except during December and January—a period dedicated to administrative wrap-up and management tasks—during which no instructors are assigned until after February. For in-person and distance learning courses, it is important to keep a close watch on registration, as there is no fixed schedule or set of specific dates; instead, registration remains open until all available spots are filled, which typically happens quite quickly.

== Projects and action programs ==
SENA was expanded and modified due to social, political, educational, and labor conditions, each with its own distinct areas and components. Evidence of this can be seen in the different areas presented below:

=== The certification of labor skills (ECCL) ===
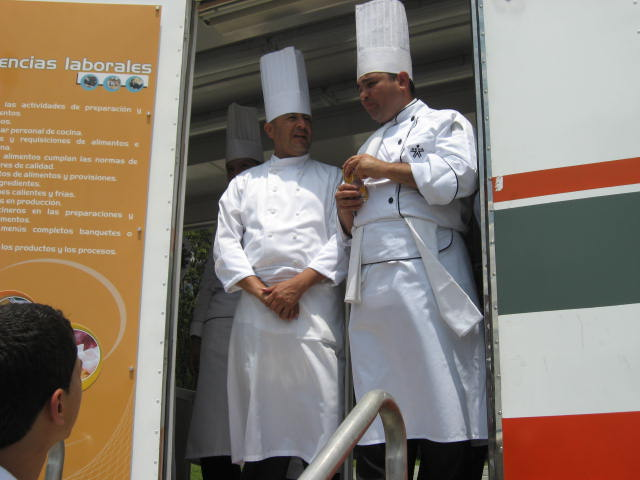
SENA Mobile Gastronomy Classroom in the Antioquia Regional Branch.

It is a crucial process for those seeking to improve their employability and compete in the job market. SENA offers various options for certifying job skills, ranging from the verification and certification of abilities, skills, and knowledge in a specific function or task, to the standardization of job skills, which involves aligning functions with quality parameters for performing a job.

=== Entrepreneurship Fund ===
It was created in December 2002 in order to support employment and expand social protection in Colombia, it finances business projects that come from Apprentices, University Interns or professionals who do not exceed two years after receiving their first university degree. It also focuses on financing business initiatives that come from and are developed by SENA students who have completed the academic stage of a training program, students or graduates of courses in the rural youth program and the training line for development leaders.

To access the benefits of SENA’s *Entrepreneurship Fund*, one must be a legal entity or an individual with a registered business establishment, and possess a company that has received support from SENA through programs such as *SENA Emprende Rural* (SER), entrepreneurship initiatives involving other funding sources, *Fondo Emprender*, or business strengthening (*Fortalecimiento Empresarial*). Alternatively, one may be enrolled in a technological degree program and choose the "productive project" option as a practical component of their studies.

=== SENNOVA ===
Observation and Acquisition of Cutting-Edge Industrial Technology in China, Darío Montoya Mejía (Head of SENA, 2002–2010).

SENNOVA is the National Innovation and Technology System of SENA—a strategy developed by the institution to promote research, technological development, innovation, and technology transfer within Colombia. Its objective is to contribute to strengthening the nation’s innovative and technological capacity by generating and transferring knowledge and technology, fostering a culture of innovation, developing applied research projects, and supporting the creation and consolidation of innovative enterprises.

SENNOVA offers a range of programs and services to support research and innovation in Colombia. These include:

- Research, Development, and Innovation (R&D+i) Network: A platform designed to foster collaboration among companies, research centers, and universities for the development of applied research projects.
- Technological Development Center (CDT): A space dedicated to research, development, and technology transfer, where innovation projects are carried out and guidance is provided to companies and entrepreneurs.
- Open Innovation: A program aimed at encouraging collaboration between companies and entrepreneurs to develop innovation projects.
- Science, Technology, and Innovation Observatory: A platform that gathers relevant information and data on innovation and technology in Colombia, facilitating decision-making for stakeholders involved in promoting innovation and technological development.

== SENA Rural Entrepreneurship (SER) ==
SENA center in Sogamoso, Boyacá regional branch.

SENA Emprende Rural is a program implemented by SENA in Colombia with the objective of promoting the productive inclusion of individuals and communities in rural areas through entrepreneurship and the creation of sustainable production units. This program seeks to offer solutions to the Colombian rural population through training, support, and strengthening of ventures in various economic sectors.

Its main features are:

1. Training and Support: The program offers training and capacity-building processes for individuals in rural areas, providing them with the technical, business, and management skills needed to create and operate their own ventures.

2. Income Generation: The program’s primary focus is to help rural entrepreneurs generate income and create employment opportunities within their communities, thereby contributing to local economic development.

3. Economic Diversification: SENA Emprende Rural seeks to foster economic diversification in rural areas by promoting the creation of productive units across various sectors, such as agriculture, agribusiness, rural tourism, and handicrafts, among others.

4. Support for Vulnerable Groups: The program also aims to provide employment options for vulnerable groups—including small-scale farmers, youth, and other at-risk populations in rural areas—thereby improving their opportunities and quality of life.

5. Strengthening Competencies: In addition to technical training, SENA Emprende Rural focuses on enhancing the business management skills of entrepreneurs, helping them run their businesses efficiently and sustainably.

6. Competency Certification: Through SENA’s Labor Competency Assessment and Certification (ECCL) division, entrepreneurs can obtain certifications that validate their skills, which in turn boosts their credibility and standing in the marketplace.

7. Technical Guidance: The program provides ongoing technical support to entrepreneurs, offering guidance on matters such as production, marketing, financial management, and other key operational aspects.

==== Target population ====
- Young rural population aged 15 to 28
- Vulnerable rural population
- Small and medium-scale agricultural producers

== Controversy ==
SENA training center in Barrancabermeja, Santander Department, Colombia.

After 19 years using Blackboard, in 2019 SENA decided to switch to the Territorium platform through a negotiation for 30 billion pesos. In February 2021, the Comptroller General ordered an inspection of the entity due to failures in the Territorium platform.

== Organization of the entity ==
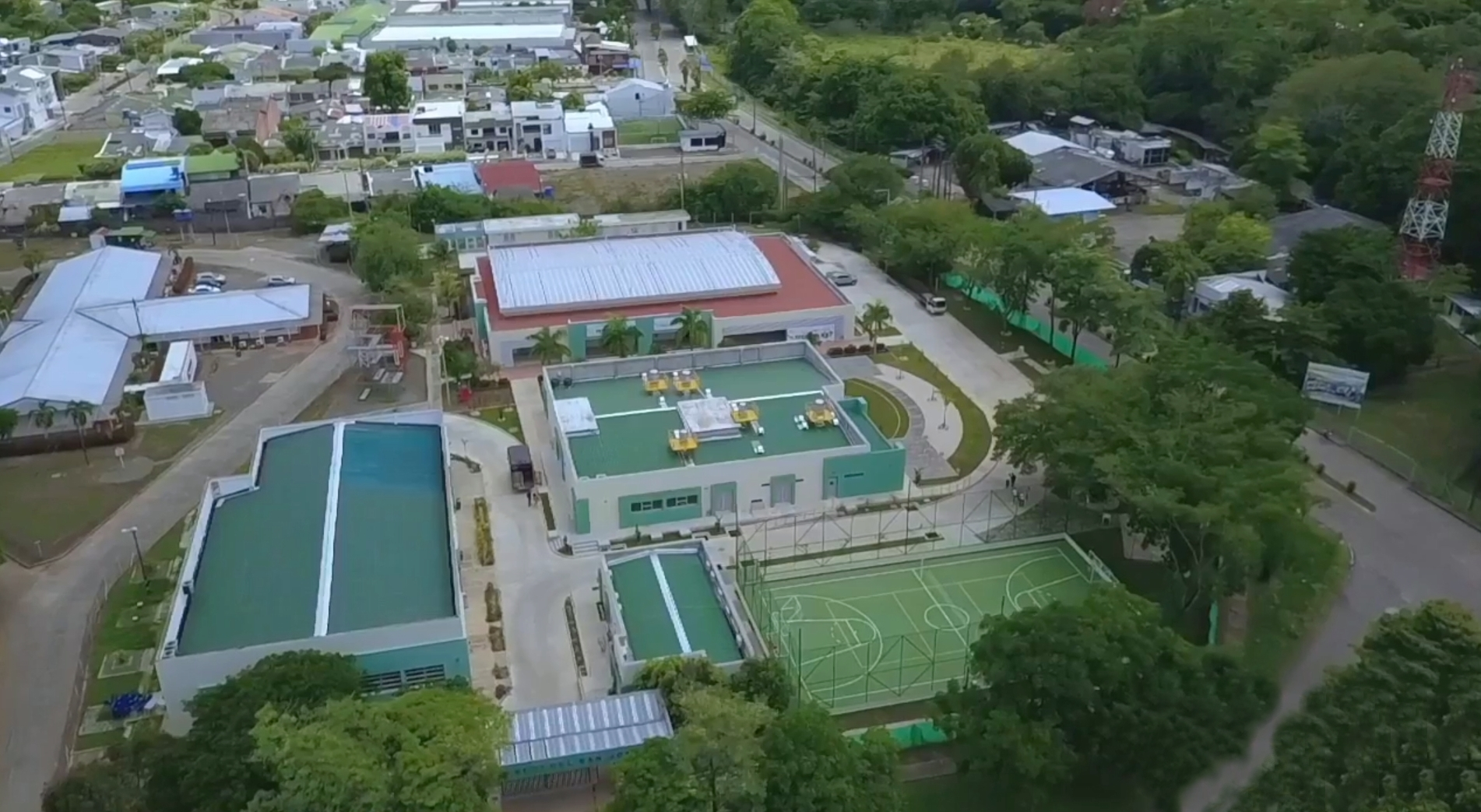
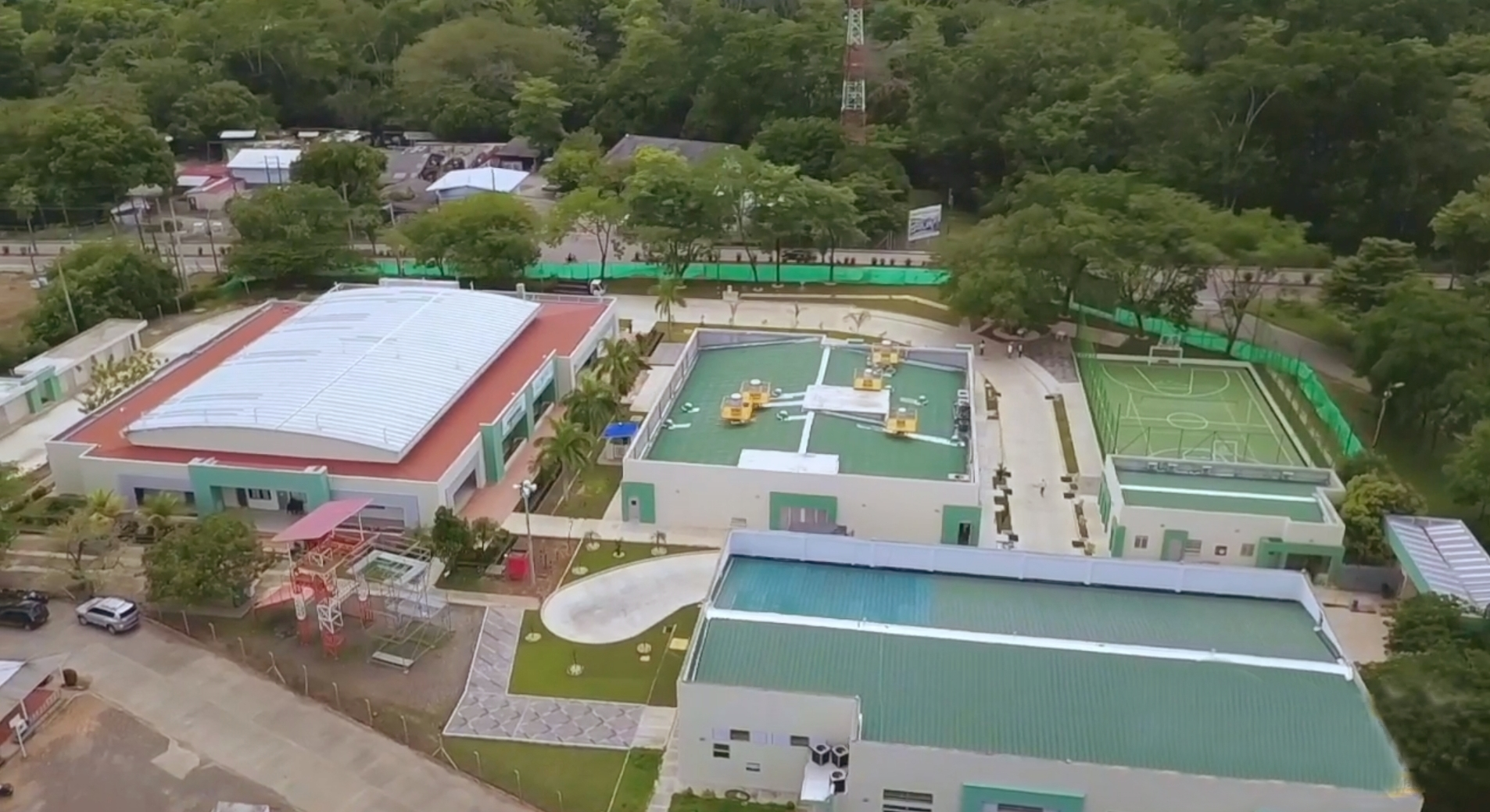
SENA Complex in San Jorge, Montelíbano, Córdoba Department, Colombia.

SENA has 33 regional headquarters and 118 training centers throughout Colombian territory, which are organized into macro-regions, which in turn are subdivided into zones:

- Andean Zone:

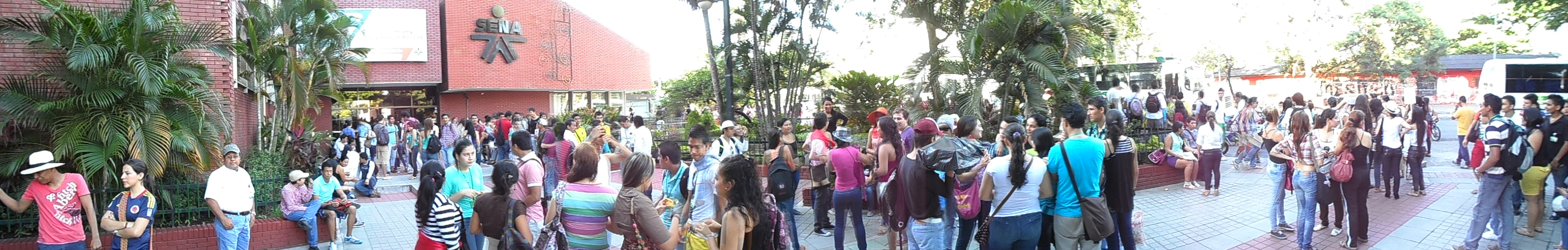
SENA Center for Industry, Business, and Services, Neiva, Huila.

  - Antioquia (16 training centers)
  - Bogotá (15 training centers)
  - Boyacá (5 training centers)
  - Caldas (5 training centers)
  - Cundinamarca (6 training centers)
  - Huila (5 training centers)
  - Norte de Santander (2 training centers)
  - Quindío (3 training centers)
  - Risaralda (3 training centers)
  - Santander (8 training centers)
  - Tolima (3 training centers)
- Caribbean Zone:
  - Atlántico (4 training centers)
  - Bolívar (4 training centers)
  - Cesar (3 training centers)
  - Córdoba (2 training centers)
  - La Guajira (2 training centers)
  - Magdalena (2 training centers)
  - San Andrés (1 training center)
  - Sucre (1 training center)
- Pacific Zone:
  - Cauca (3 training centers)
  - Chocó (1 training center)
  - Nariño (3 training centers)
  - Valle del Cauca (10 training centers)
- Amazon Zone:
  - Amazonas (1 training center)
  - Caquetá (1 training center)
  - Guainía (1 training center)
  - Putumayo (1 training center)
  - Vaupés (1 training center)
- Orinoquía Zone:
  - Arauca (1 training center)
  - Casanare (1 training center)
  - Guaviare (1 training center)
  - Meta (2 training centers)
  - Vichada (1 training center)

== Heads of SENA ==
SENA offices in Bogotá, Colombia.
- Rodolfo Martínez Tono (1957-1974)
- Eduardo Gaitán Duran (1974-1977)
- Gilberto Echeverri Mejía (1977-1978)
- Alberto Galeano Ramírez (1978-1981 y 1982-1986)
- Pedro de Narváez López (temporary 1981-1982)
- Enrique Low Murtra (1986-1987)
- Clara Elsa Villalba de Sandoval (1987-1990)
- Hernando Arango Monedero (1990-1993)
- Carlos Hernan Peñaloza Martínez (1993-1996)
- Alberto Lora Pedroza (1996-1997)
- Rafael Ramírez Zorro (1997-2002)

Community Accountability Council, August 15, 2009 – Dario Montoya Mejía (Head of SENA).

- Dario Montoya Mejía (2002-2010)
- P. Camilo Bernal Hadad (2011-2012)
- Luis Alfonso Hoyos (2012-2013)
- Gina Parody (2013-2014)
- Arturo Fernando Rojas Rojas (interino 2014-2018)
- Alfonso Prada (2014-2017)
- María Andrea Nieto (2017-2018)
- José Antonio Lizarazo Sarmiento (enero-septiembre de 2018)
- Carlos Mario Estrada (2018-2022)
- Jorge Eduardo Londoño (2022-2026)
- "Fray" Ricardo Torres Castro (2026-Today)

== Slogans ==
- A world-class entity
- SENA: Knowledge and entrepreneurship for all Colombians.
- SENA: knowledge and employment for all Colombians
- SENA returns to the countryside
