= Jorge Mario Eastman =

Colombian politician (born 1967)

Colombian Ambassador to the Holy See
- In office October 10, 2019 – February 8, 2022
- President: Iván Duque
- Preceded by: Julio Aníbal Riaño
- Succeeded by: Alberto Ospina Carreño

General Secretary of the Presidency
- In office August 7, 2018 – April 24, 2019
- President: Iván Duque
- Preceded by: Alfonso Prada
- Succeeded by: María Paula Correa

Deputy Minister of Defense for Politics and International Affairs
- In office December 20, 2009 – August 7, 2010
- President: Álvaro Uribe
- Preceded by: Sergio Jaramillo Caro
- Succeeded by: Juan Carlos Pinzón

Personal details
- Born: Jorge Mario Eastman Robledo; February 5, 1967 (age 59) Bogotá, D.C., Colombia
- Party: Democratic Center (2010-present)
- Education: University of the Andes (BBL); Columbia University (BBS)

Jorge Mario Eastman Robledo (born February 5, 1967) is a Colombian lawyer, politician, and diplomat who served as Colombian Ambassador to the Holy See under President Iván Duque from 2019 to 2022. He also served as general secretary of the presidency and deputy minister of defense for politics and international affairs.

Born in Bogotá, D.C., Eastman studied law at the University of the Andes and earned his master's degree in international affairs from Columbia University. In August 2018, he was appointed Secretary General of the Presidency by President-elect Iván Duque.

Political offices
Preceded by Sergio Jaramillo Caro	Deputy Minister of Defense for Politics and International Affairs; 2009-2010	Succeeded by Juan Carlos Pinzón
Preceded by Alfonso Prada	General Secretary of the Presidency; 2018–2019	Succeeded by María Paula Correa
Diplomatic posts
Preceded by Julio Aníbal Riaño	Colombian Ambassador to the Holy See; 2019-2022	Succeeded by Alberto Ospina Carreño
