= Nicolás Gómez Arenas =

Colombian politician (born 1997)

Chief of Staff of the Casa de Nariño
- Incumbent
- Assumed office 20 July 2026
- Preceded by: José Raúl Moreno

Personal details
- Born: 22 September 1997 (age 28)
- Party: National Salvation Movement
- Parent: Enrique Gómez Martínez (father)

Nicolás Gómez Arenas (born 22 September 1997) is a Colombian politician serving as chief of staff of the Casa de Nariño since 2026. From 2021 to 2026, he served as political secretary of the National Salvation Movement. He is the son of Enrique Gómez Martínez.
