= Diego Molano Aponte =

Colombian politician (born 1970)

Diego Molano
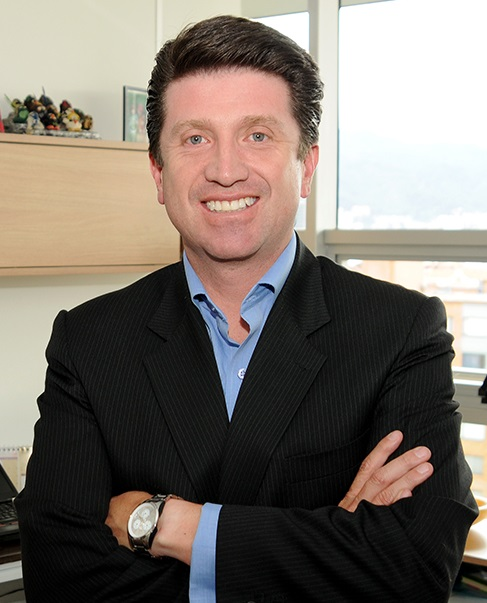

Minister of National Defence
- In office 1 February 2021 – 7 August 2022
- President: Iván Duque
- Preceded by: Carlos Holmes Trujillo
- Succeeded by: Iván Velásquez

General Director of Administrative Department of the Presidency
- In office 3 October 2019 – 2 February 2021
- President: Iván Duque
- Preceded by: María Paula Correa
- Succeeded by: Víctor Manuel Muñoz

General Director of the CIFW
- In office 8 November 2012 – 2 March 2013
- President: Juan Manuel Santos
- Preceded by: Elvira Forero
- Succeeded by: Adriana Gónzalez

General Director of the SAIC
- In office 15 September 2009 – 5 November 2011
- President: Álvaro Uribe
- Preceded by: Luis Alfonso Hoyos
- Succeeded by: Bruce Mac Master

Personal details
- Born: Diego Andrés Molano Aponte; 29 June 1970 (age 56) Bogotá, D.C., Colombia
- Party: Democratic Center
- Spouse: Marcela Rodríguez
- Education: Del Rosario University, Bogotá; Columbia University, New York

Diego Andrés Molano Aponte (born 29 June 1970) is a Colombian politician and business administrator who served as the Minister of National Defense from February 2021 to August 2022 under president Ivan Duque.

== Early life and education ==
Diego Andrés Molano Aponte was born in Bogotá on 29 June 1970. He studied business administration at the Del Rosario University, specialized in international integration and then he earned his master's degree at Columbia University. New York.

== Career ==
He was a professor and a researcher at the Del Rosario University, where he published a book called Inter-Agency Coordination as a Generator of Public Value and Social Transformation.

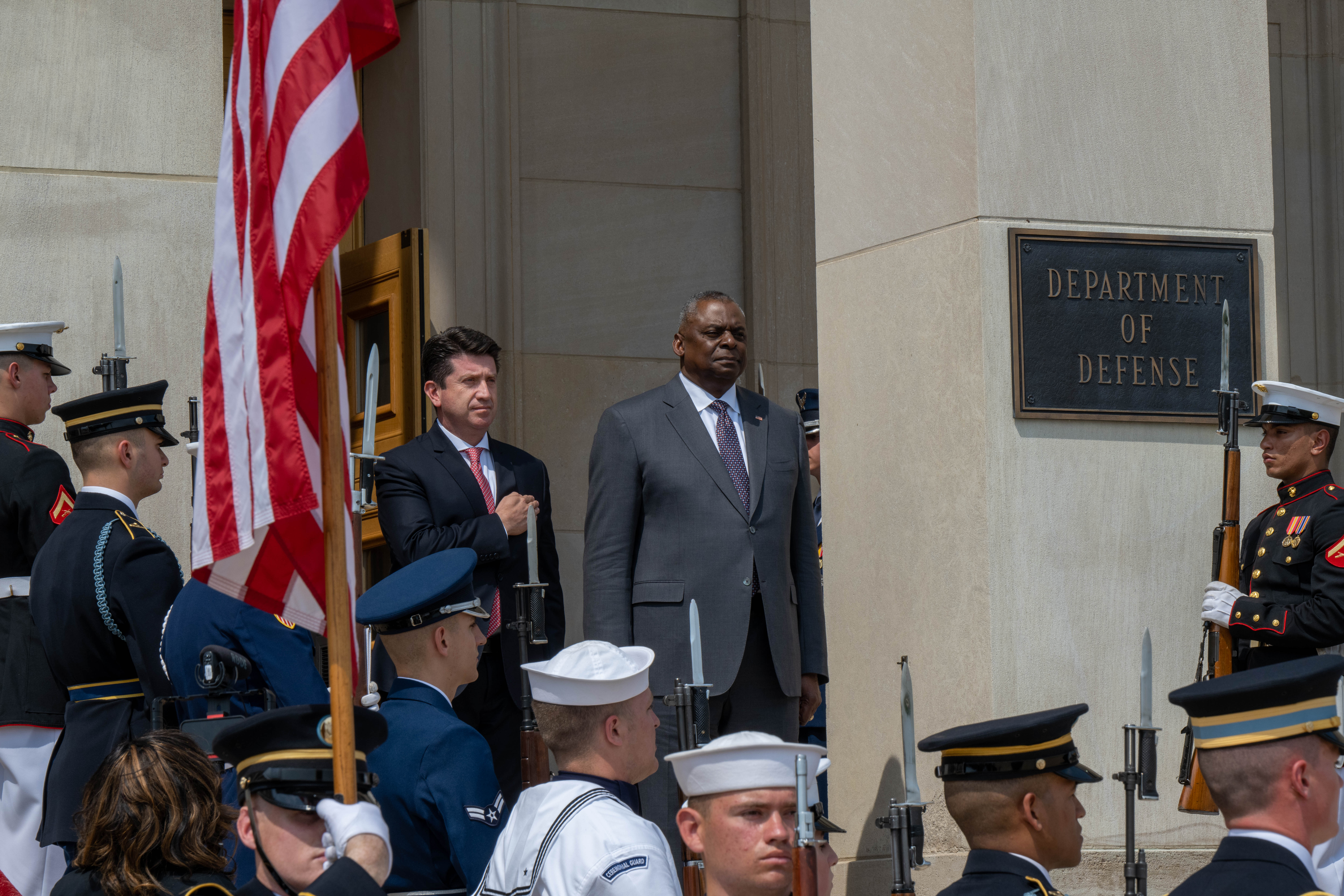
Molano with U.S. Secretary of Defense Lloyd Austin in May 2022

On 1 February 2021 Molano was named minister of national defense of Colombia.

Political offices
Preceded by Carlos Holmes Trujillo	Minister of National Defense; 2021–2022	Succeeded by Iván Velásquez
Order of precedence
Preceded by William Ruiz Orjuela as Former Minister of Health and Social Protection	Order of precedence of Colombia as Former Cabinet Member	Succeeded by Rodolfo Zea as Former Minister of Agriculture and Rural Development
