= Carlos Ramón González =

Colombian politician (born 1958)

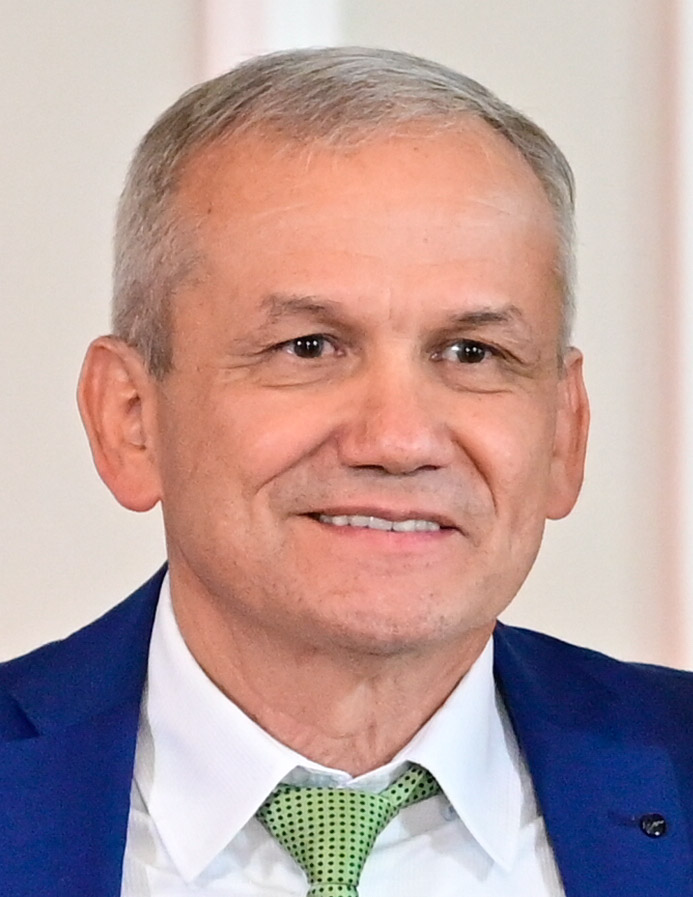

General Director of National Intelligence
- In office February 23, 2024 – July 26, 2024
- President: Gustavo Petro
- Preceded by: Manuel Casanova

General Director of Administrative Department of the Presidency
- In office April 26, 2022 – February 23, 2024
- President: Gustavo Petro
- Preceded by: Mauricio Lizcano
- Succeeded by: Laura Sarabia

President of the Green Alliance
- In office May 29, 2019 – April 26, 2023 Serving with Antonio Navarro Wolf; Antanas Mockus
- Preceded by: Rodrigo Romero
- Succeeded by: Carlos Amaya

Councilor of Bucaramanga
- In office January 1, 1995 – December 31, 1998

Member of the Chamber of Representatives
- In office December 12, 1991 – July 20, 1994
- Constituency: Santander

Personal details
- Born: Carlos Ramón González Merchán; November 11, 1958 (age 67) Puente Nacional, Santander, Colombia
- Party: Green Alliance (since 1994)
- Other political affiliations: M-19 (until 1994)
- Education: Industrial University of Santander (BBL)
- Occupation: Politician and activist

Carlos Ramón González Merchán (born November 11, 1958) is a Colombian politician and former member of the M-19 guerrilla, who served as General Director of National Intelligence from February to July 2024 under President Gustavo Petro. He also served as member of chamber of Representatives, co-president of the green alliance party and general director of administrative department of the presidency.

Political offices
| Preceded by Mauricio Lizcano | General Director of Administrative Department of the Presidency; 2023–2024 | Succeeded by Laura Sarabia |
| Preceded by Manuel Casanova | General Director of National Intelligence; 2024-2024 | Succeeded by Vacant |
