= Mauricio Lizcano =

Colombian politician (born 1976)

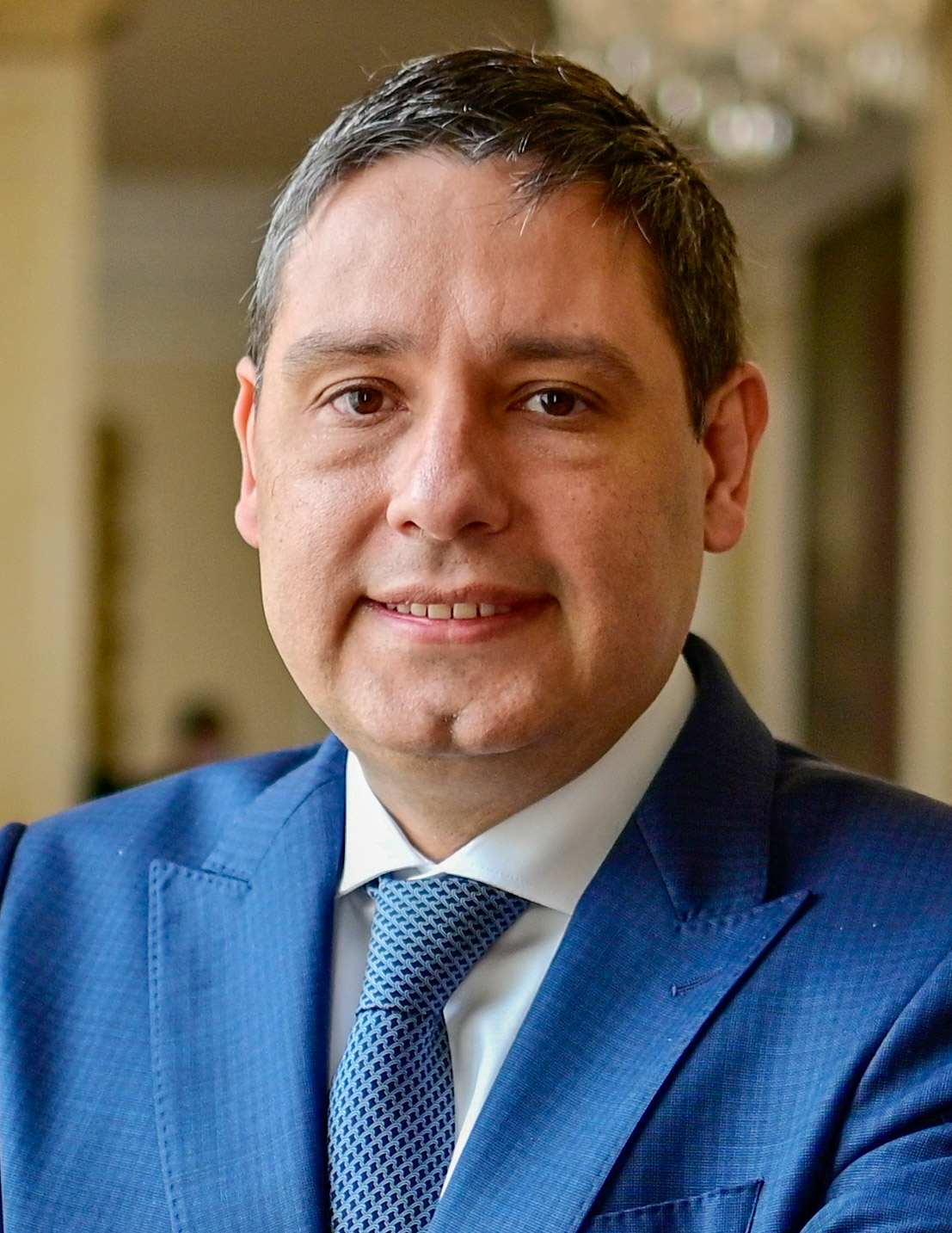
- Official portrait, 2023

Minister of Information Technologies and Communications
- In office 1 May 2023 – 27 January 2025
- President: Gustavo Petro
- Preceded by: Sandra Urrutia
- Succeeded by: Julián Molina

General Director of Administrative Department of the Presidency
- In office 7 August 2022 – 1 May 2023
- President: Gustavo Petro
- Preceded by: Víctor Manuel Muñoz
- Succeeded by: Carlos Ramón González

President of the Senate
- In office 20 July 2016 – 20 July 2017
- Preceded by: Luis Fernando Velasco
- Succeeded by: Efraín Cepeda

Senator of Colombia
- In office 20 July 2010 – 20 July 2018

Member of the Chamber of Representatives
- In office 20 July 2006 – 20 July 2010
- Constituency: Caldas

Personal details
- Born: Óscar Mauricio Lizcano Arango; 12 August 1976 (age 49) Medellín, Antioquia, Colombia
- Party: Independent (2021-present)
- Other political affiliations: Union Party for the People (2006-2021)
- Spouse: Catalina Mesa (m. 2006)
- Education: Del Rosario University (BL); Massachusetts Institute of Technology (MBA); Harvard University (MPA)

Óscar Mauricio Lizcano Arango (born 12 August 1976) is a Colombian lawyer and politician who served as Minister of Information Technologies and Communications from 2023 to 2025 under President Gustavo Petro. Lizcano has served as General Director of Administrative Department of the Presidency and President of the Senate.

Born in Medellín, Antioquia, Lizcano holds a degree in Law from the Del Rosario University. He was elected to the Chamber of Representatives for Caldas in 2006 and later as a Senator in 2010, a position he held for eight years.

Political offices
Preceded by Luis Fernando Velasco	President of the Senate; 2016-2017	Succeeded by Efraín Cepeda
Preceded by Víctor Manuel Muñoz	General Director of Administrative Department of the Presidency; 2022-2023	Succeeded by Carlos Ramón González
Preceded by Sandra Urrutia	Minister of Information Technologies and Communications; 2023-2025	Succeeded by Julián Molina
