= General Director of Administrative Department of the Presidency =

Colombian national government official

General Director of Administrative Department of the Presidency of Colombia
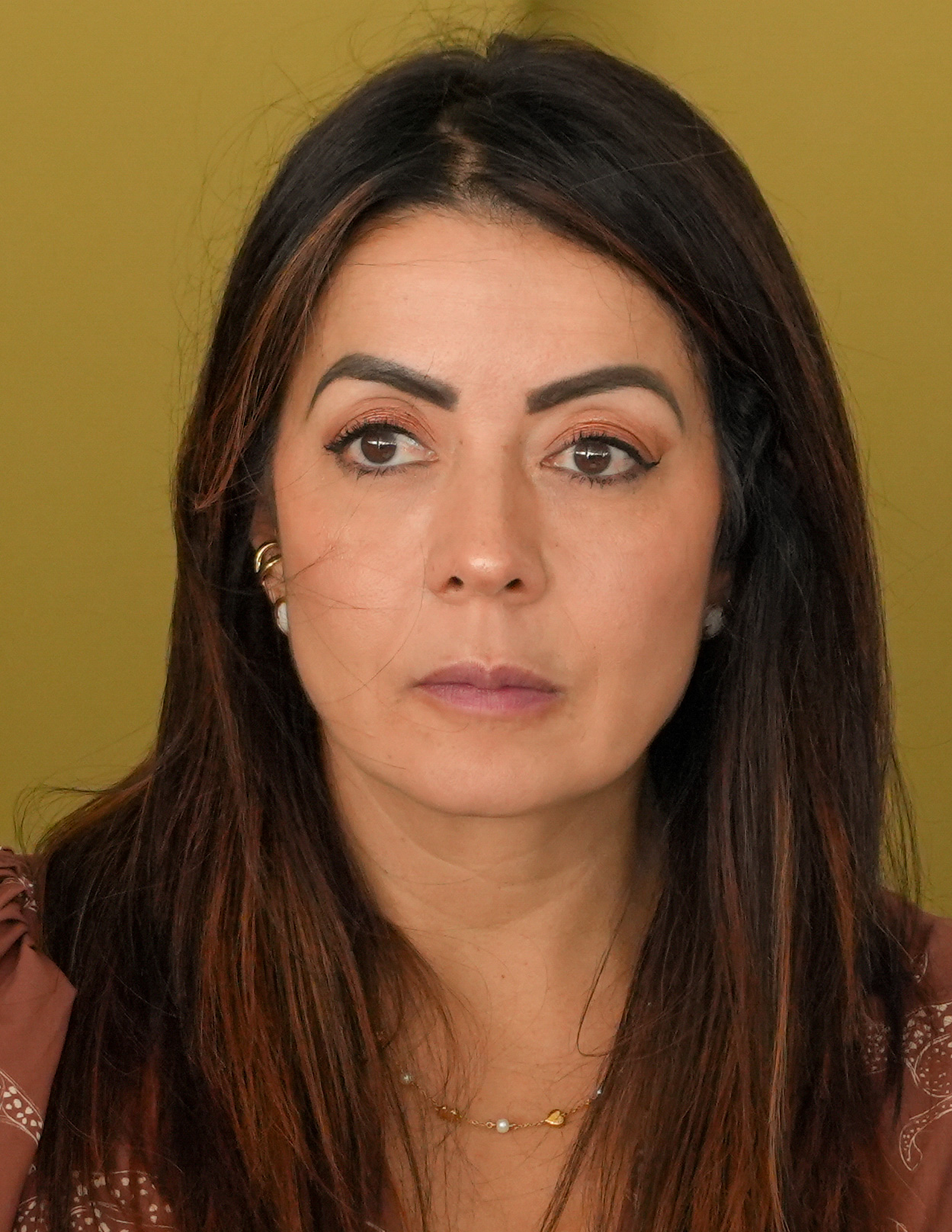
- Incumbent; Nhora Mondragón since January 22, 2026
- Seat: Bogotá, D.C.
- Appointer: President of Colombia
- Inaugural holder: María Paula Correa
- Formation: November 25, 1958
- Website: www.dapre.gov.co

The General Director of Administrative Department of the Presidency (General Director of DAPRE) is in charge of overseeing, managing, and executing the administrative tasks related to the presidency of Colombia, while also ensuring the effective implementation of government policies. In this role, the General Director leads the coordination between the Presidency and other state institutions, as well as civil society, and provides support to the President in fulfilling both constitutional and administrative duties.

== List ==
=== List of general secretaries of the presidency ===
From its founding in 1898 until 2014, the highest position within the Administrative Department of the Presidency of the Republic was that of General Secretary of the Presidency, which changed its name in 2014 during the administration of Juan Manuel Santos.

Name	Assumed office	Left office	President(s) served under	Ref.
Rodrigo Lloreda	May 16, 1980	August 7, 1981	Julio César Turbay Ayala	
Germán Montoya	August 7, 1986	August 7, 1990	Virgilio Barco	
Alberto Velásquez Echeverri	July 6, 2005	August 7, 2006	Álvaro Uribe	
Bernardo Moreno	August 7, 2006	August 7, 2010	Álvaro Uribe	
Juan Carlos Pinzón	August 7, 2010	September 5, 2011	Juan Manuel Santos	
Federico Renjifo Vélez	September 8, 2011	May 17, 2012	Juan Manuel Santos	
Juan Mesa	May 20, 2017	May 17, 2013	Juan Manuel Santos	
Néstor Humberto Martínez	August 7, 2014	June 15, 2015	Juan Manuel Santos	
María Lorena Gutiérrez	June 18, 2015	March 3, 2016	Juan Manuel Santos	
Luis Guillermo Vélez	March 6, 2016	March 25, 2017	Juan Manuel Santos	
Alfonso Prada	March 28, 2017	August 7, 2018	Juan Manuel Santos	
Jorge Mario Eastman	August 7, 2018	April 24, 2019	Iván Duque	

=== List of general directors of DAPRE ===
In 2018, during Iván Duque administration, the position was restructured, taking on its current name of General Director of the Administrative Department of the Presidency.

Name	Assumed office	Left office	President(s) served under	Ref.
María Paula Correa	April 24, 2019	October 2, 2019	Iván Duque	
Diego Molano	October 3, 2019	February 2, 2021	Iván Duque	
Víctor Manuel Muñoz	February 2, 2021	August 7, 2022	Iván Duque	
Mauricio Lizcano	August 7, 2022	May 1, 2023	Gustavo Petro	
Carlos Ramón González	April 26, 2022	February 23, 2024	Gustavo Petro	
Laura Sarabia	February 23, 2024	January 20, 2025	Gustavo Petro	
Jorge Rojas	January 29, 2025	February 5, 2025	Gustavo Petro	
Angie Rodríguez	February 5, 2025	January 13, 2026	Gustavo Petro	
Nhora Mondragón	January 22, 2026	Incumbent	Gustavo Petro	
