= Laura Sarabia =

Colombian politician (born 1994)

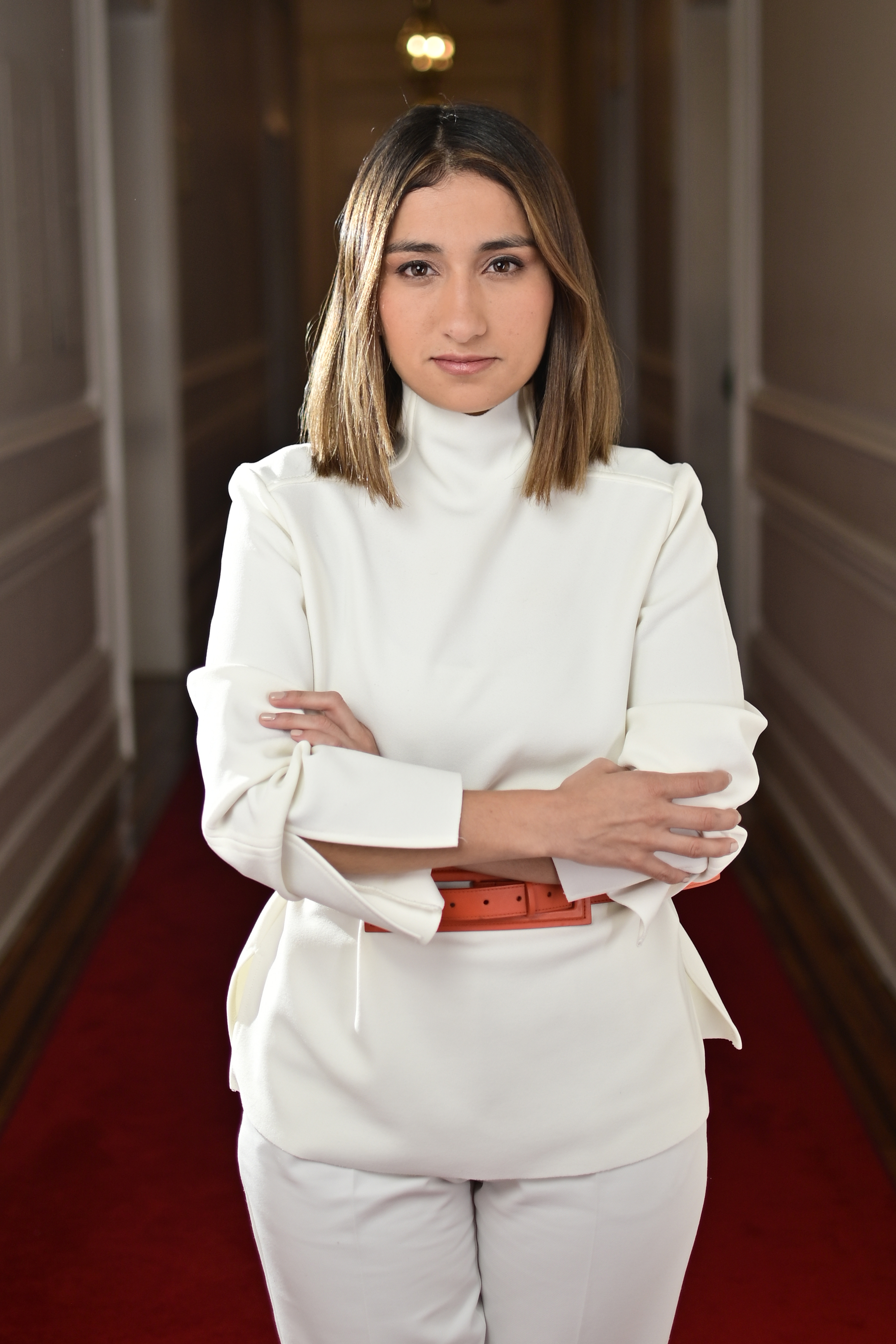
- Official portrait, 2022

Colombian Ambassador to the United Kingdom
- In office October 1, 2025 – June 29, 2026
- President: Gustavo Petro
- Preceded by: Roy Barreras
- Succeeded by: Miguel Uribe Londoño

Minister of Foreign Affairs
- In office January 29, 2025 – July 3, 2025
- President: Gustavo Petro
- Preceded by: Luis Gilberto Murillo
- Succeeded by: Yolanda Villavicencio

General Director of Administrative Department of the Presidency
- In office February 23, 2024 – January 20, 2025
- President: Gustavo Petro
- Preceded by: Carlos Ramón González
- Succeeded by: Jorge Rojas

General Director of Social Prosperity
- In office September 4, 2023 – February 19, 2024
- President: Gustavo Petro
- Preceded by: Cielo Rusinque
- Succeeded by: Gustavo Bolívar

Chief of Staff of the Casa de Nariño
- In office August 7, 2022 – June 2, 2023
- President: Gustavo Petro
- Preceded by: María Paula Correa
- Succeeded by: Armando Benedetti

Personal details
- Born: Laura Camila Sarabia Torres; March 20, 1994 (age 32) Bogotá, D.C., Colombia
- Party: Independent (since 2020)
- Education: Universidad Militar Nueva Granada
- Occupation: Politician

Laura Camila Sarabia Torres (born March 20, 1994) is a Colombian politician and diplomat who served as Colombian Ambassador to the United Kingdom from 2025 to 2026 under President Gustavo Petro.

Sarabia was born in Bogotá, D.C. She graduated with a degree in international relations from the Nueva Granada Military University. After serving as head of debate and communications advisor for Gustavo Petro 2022 presidential campaign, she was appointed Chief of Staff of the Casa de Nariño. As head of the Casa de Nariño office, Sarabia was considered Petro's right-hand woman, a position she held for two years. In September 2023, she was appointed General Director of Social Prosperity, a position she held until February 2024, when the Petro administration restructured the administrative department of the presidency, appointing her general director. She remained in this role until January 2025, when she was announced for her fourth position in the administration, this time as Minister of Foreign Affairs.

Due to her influence on the Petro administration's policies, she was described as the "most powerful woman in the country." Sarabia became the second woman to serve as Colombian ambassador to the United Kingdom, and her tenure in the Petro administration has made her the most powerful official in the all administration.

== Career ==
Sarabia is a graduate of the Nueva Granada Military University in international relations and has a specialization in political, marketing and campaign strategies. Upon graduating, she worked as secretary to then-Congressman Armando Benedetti, who later introduced her to Gustavo Petro’s presidential campaign and subsequently into the administration. She then served as strategic chief of the presidential campaign of Gustavo Petro, on July 25 she was appointed to the position of chief of staff from which she was removed on 2 June 2023, following the revelation of evidence allegedly implicating her in illegal phone interceptions.

Sarabia was one of two political allies that were involved in the Petro administration that resigned following the scandal, including Armando Benedetti but later returned.

== Chief of Staff of the Presidency (2022-2023) ==
Sarabia was announced as Chief of Staff of the Casa de Nariño in July 2022 and took office in August 2022. Her tenure as President Petro's right-hand man ended with her resignation in June 2023 amid allegations of abuse of power by one of her private employees, who alleged was subject to a polygraph test in the basement of the Casa de Nariño. The police man involved, died in mysterious circumstances .

== General Director of Social Prosperity (2023-2024) ==
In September 2023, she took office as General Director of Social Prosperity, replacing Cielo Rusinque. Her time at the Administrative Department of Social Prosperity was less than a year, making her one of the shortest-serving directors of the agency.

== General Director of Administrative Department of the Presidency (2024-2025) ==
In February 2024, she took office as General Director of Administrative Department of the Presidency. After its restructuring, her functions were gradually similar to those of her previous position as Chief of Staff of the Presidency, this time having administrative-level powers within the Administrative Department of the Presidency of the Republic, as well as at the level of his dependencies. Her role as General Director of the DAPRE generated diverse opinions and rethought its role within the Petro administration.

== Minister of Foreign Affairs (2025) ==
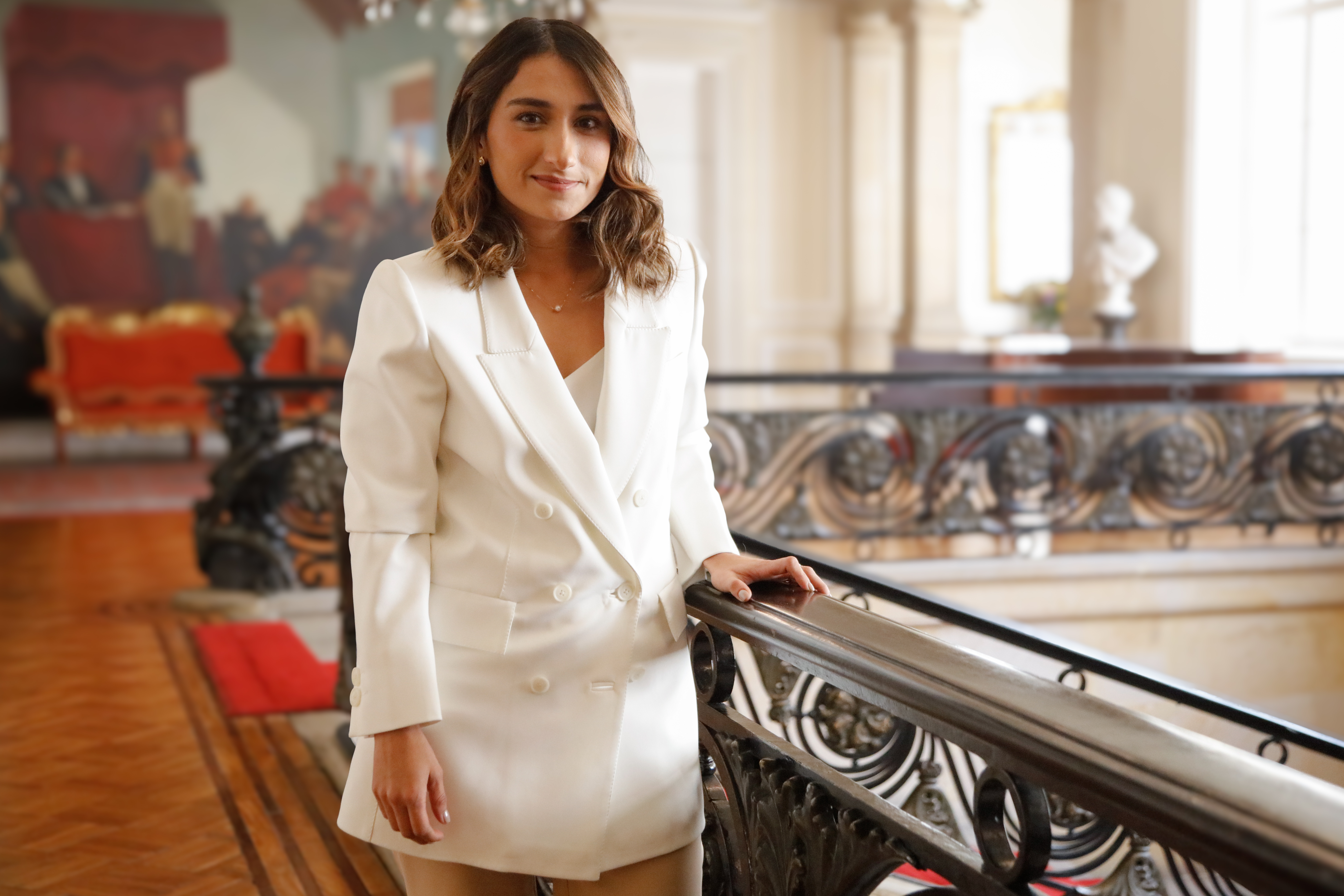
Official portrait, 2025

On January 28, 2025, she assumed her fourth position in the Petro administration as Minister of Foreign Affairs, which generated controversy from some Cabinet members, leading to later resignations due to the status of Sarabia and Armando Benedetti in the administration. She resigned in early July 2025.

Political offices
| Preceded by María Paula Correa | Chief of Staff of the Casa de Nariño; 2022–2023 | Succeeded by Armando Benedetti |
| Preceded by Cielo Rusinque | General Director of Social Prosperity; 2023–2024 | Succeeded by Gustavo Bolívar |
| Preceded by Carlos Ramón González | General Director of Administrative Department of the Presidency; 2024–2025 | Succeeded by Jorge Rojas |
| Preceded by Luis Gilberto Murillo | Minister of Foreign Affairs; 2025 | Succeeded by Yolanda Villavicencio |
Diplomatic posts
| Preceded by Roy Barreras | Colombian Ambassador to the United Kingdom; 2025-2026 | Succeeded by Miguel Uribe Londoño |
