= Hernando Agudelo Villa =

Colombian lawyer and politician

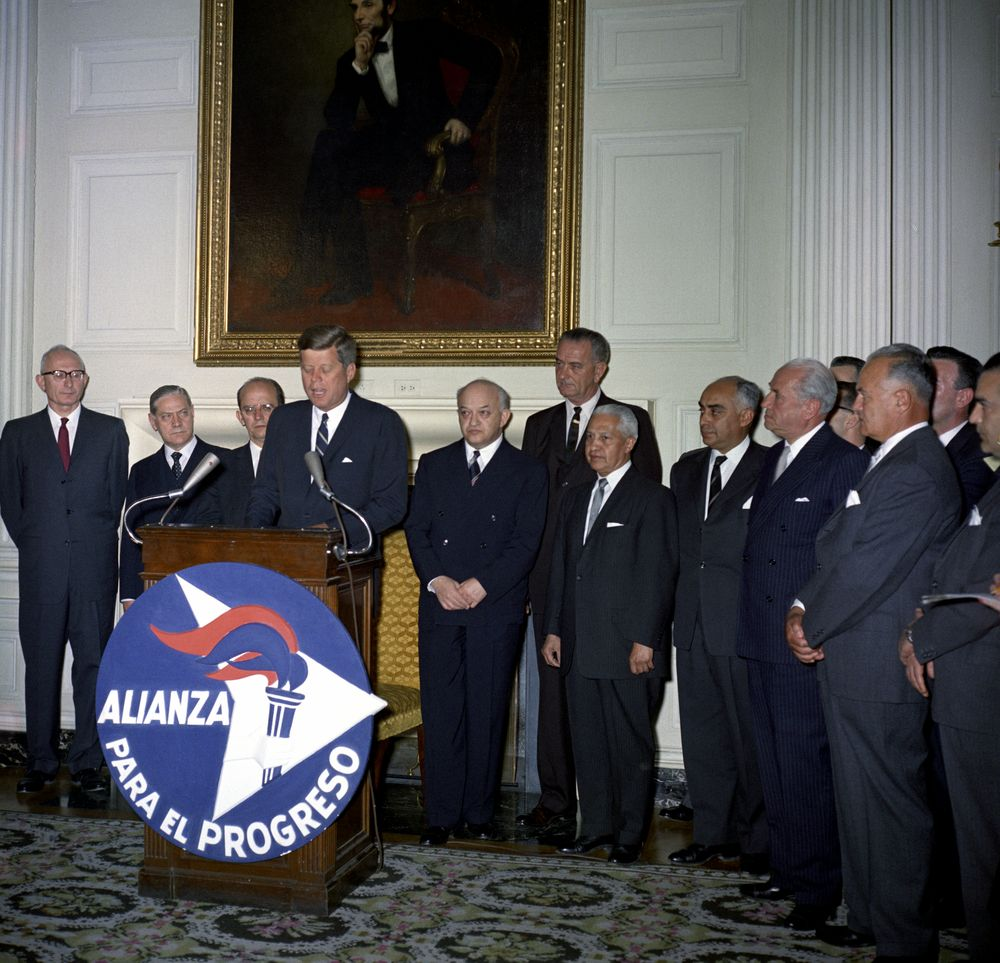

Hernando Agudelo Villa (9 March 1923 – 29 July 2010) was a Colombian lawyer and liberal politician. He was born in Medellín on 9 March 1923. He was educated at the Ateneo Antioqueño school and the Liceo Antioqueño. He then pursued his higher education in law and political science at the Universidad de Antioquia, graduating in 1951. He also did postgraduate studies at the London School of Economics in 1955–56.

He was the director and president of the Federación Nacional de Comerciantes (FENALCO) between 1947 and 1958. He also served in the cabinet as Minister of Finance between 1958 and 1961. He served variously as president of the Sociedad Económica de Amigos del País and as director of the Inter-American Development Bank. He was a member of the Comité de los Nueve en la Alianza para el Progreso (1962–1964) and a leading liberal in Antioquia during the 1960s and 1970s. He was a pre-candidate for the presidential election in 1978, which was eventually won by his friend and rival Julio César Turbay Ayala.

He was one of the key figures behind the left-leaning political group La Ceja. He wrote several books: Cuatro etapas de la inflación en Colombia, La revolución del desarrollo (Alianza para el Progreso), Hacia un liberalismo moderno, La alternativa: un liberalismo de izquierda, and Retorno del liberalismo.

He died in Bogotá in July 2010.
