= Armando Benedetti =

Colombian politician

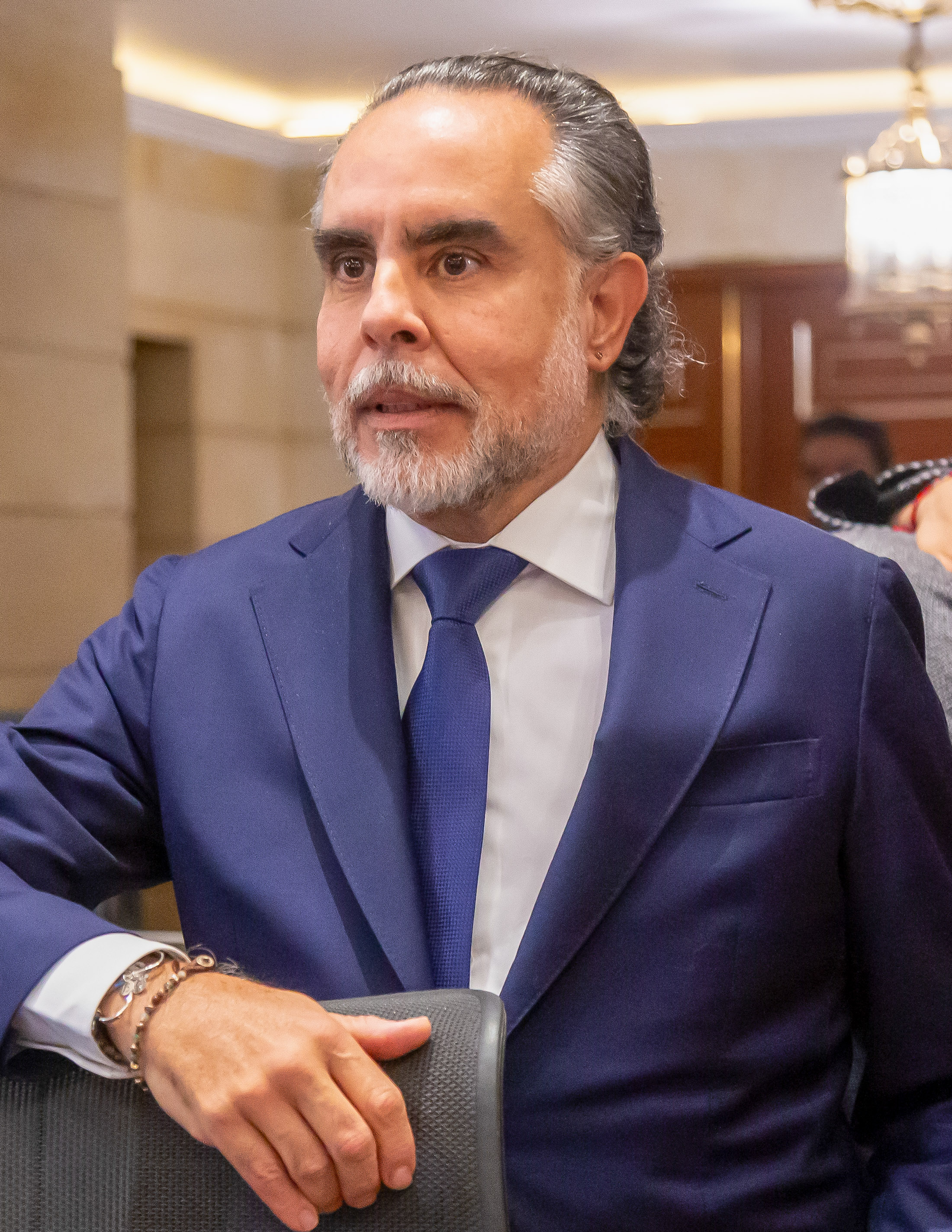
- Benedetti in 2025

Minister of the Interior
- In office 3 March 2025 – 7 August 2026
- President: Gustavo Petro
- Preceded by: Juan Fernando Cristo
- Succeeded by: Rodrigo Lara Restrepo

Chief of Staff of the Casa de Nariño
- In office 3 February 2025 – 1 March 2025
- President: Gustavo Petro
- Preceded by: Laura Sarabia
- Succeeded by: Alfredo Saade

Ambassador of Colombia to FAO
- In office 8 February 2024 – 25 November 2024
- President: Gustavo Petro
- Preceded by: Hernando Agudelo
- Succeeded by: Jhenifer Mojica

Ambassador of Colombia to Venezuela
- In office 24 August 2022 – 19 July 2023
- President: Gustavo Petro
- Preceded by: Germán Castañeda
- Succeeded by: Milton Rengifo

President of the Social Party of National Unity
- In office June 8, 2016 – October 20, 2017
- Preceded by: Roy Barreras
- Succeeded by: Aurelio Iragorri Valencia

President of the Senate
- In office 20 July 2010 – 20 July 2011
- Preceded by: Javier Enrique Cáceres
- Succeeded by: Juan Manuel Corzo

Senator of Colombia
- In office 20 July 2006 – 20 July 2022

Member of the Chamber of Representatives
- In office 20 July 2002 – 20 July 2006
- Constituency: Capital District

Personal details
- Born: Armando Alberto Benedetti Villaneda; 29 August 1967 (age 59) Barranquilla, Atlántico, Colombia
- Party: Humane Colombia (2020-present)
- Other political affiliations: Social Party of National Unity (2005-2020); Liberal (1998-2005); Historic Pact for Colombia (2021-present)
- Spouses: María Angélica Navarro (m. 1982; div. 1984); Jaifa Mezher (m. 1997; div. 2004); Angelica Castro (m. 2010; div. 2012); Adelina Guerrero (m. 2014)
- Education: Pontifical Xavierian University (BA)
- Website: www.armandobenedetti.com

Armando Alberto Benedetti Villaneda (born 29 August 1967) is a Colombian social communicator, journalist, politician, and diplomat who has served as Minister of the Interior since 2025. A member of the Humane Colombia party, he has also served as Ambassador of Colombia to Venezuela, Colombia's Ambassador to the FAO, and Chief of Staff of the Casa de Nariño.

Born in Barranquilla, Atlántico. He holds a degree in Social Communication from the Pontifical Xavierian University. After serving as a Councilor of Bogotá from 1998 to 2000, he was elected to the Chamber of Representatives for Bogotá and later elected Senator in 2006, a position he held for sixteen years.

In 2022, he joined Gustavo Petro 2022 presidential campaign. Due to his political influence within the Petro administration, he is one of its most controversial members. In February 2024, he was confirmed as Chief of Staff of the Casa de Nariño and a week later as Minister of the Interior, replacing Juan Fernando Cristo.

== Career ==
Benedetti attended the Pontifical Xavierian University, and graduated with a degree in communication studies. He briefly worked as a reporter for Noticiero QAP between 1990 and 1991, and later served as political adviser to Eduardo Verano de la Rosa during the 1991 Constituent Assembly. He served as Secretary General of Public Establishments of the National Traffic and Transport Institute (Intra) between 1992 and 1993, and was later appointed deputy director of the Colombia Health Resource Company (Ecosalud), serving from 1996 to 1997.

In 1998, Benedetti was elected to the Bogotá City Council as a Liberal party candidate, and head of his electoral list. He served as Council Member until 2000, when he decided not to seek re-election in order to run for Congress.

=== Congressman ===
During the 2002 parliamentary elections, Benedetti ran for a seat in the Chamber of Representatives for the circumscription of the Capital District as a Liberal candidate and head of his electoral list. He won with 31,855 votes.

=== Senator ===
In 2006, Benedetti decided to run in the 2006 parliamentary elections, this time for a seat in the Senate, and this time as a Social Party of National Unity candidate. He won a seat in the national elections with 50,356 votes.

In 2010, Benedetti was re-elected to the Senate with 81,029 votes, On 20 July 2010, Benedetti was elected by his peers President of the Senate. As President of the Senate, Benedetti administered the oath of office to President Juan Manuel Santos Calderón when he took office the following month on 7 August.

=== Ambassador ===
In August 2022, President Petro appointed Benedetti as Ambassador to Venezuela. On June 2, 2023, Ambassador Benedetti submitted a letter of resignation to President Petro after recordings of phone conversations surfaced in the media. In these, Benedetti threatened President Petro's Chief of Staff, Laura Sarabia, with releasing information regarding Petro's campaign financing that could, according to him, topple the government and send people to prison. Sarabia, who got her start in politics as an aide to Benedetti, resigned as Chief of Staff on June 2, 2023.

== Personal life ==
Armando Alberto was born on 29 August 1967 in Barranquilla, Colombia, to Armando Benedetti Jimeno and Genoveva Villaneda Jiménez. His sister Ángela María is the current Ambassador of Colombia to Panama.

== Sanctions ==
On October 24, 2025, the United States imposed sanctions against Benedetti, accusing him of involvement in drug-trafficking.

Party political offices
Preceded by Roy Barreras	President of the Social Party of National Unity; 2010-2011	Succeeded by Aurelio Iragorri Valencia
Diplomatic posts
Preceded by Germán Castañeda	Ambassador of Colombia to Venezuela; 2022-2023	Succeeded by Milton Reginfo
Preceded by Hernando Agudelo	Ambassador of Colombia to FAO; 2024-2024	Succeeded by Jhenifer Mojica
Political offices
Preceded by Javier Enrique Cáceres	President of the Senate; 2010–2011	Succeeded by Juan Manuel Corzo
Preceded by Laura Sarabia	Chief of Staff of the Casa de Nariño; 2025–2025	Succeeded by Alfredo Saade
Preceded by Juan Fernando Cristo	Minister of the Interior; 2025–2026	Succeeded by Rodrigo Lara Restrepo
