= Minister of the Interior (Colombia) =

Minister of the Interior of Colombia

Minister of the Interior of Colombia
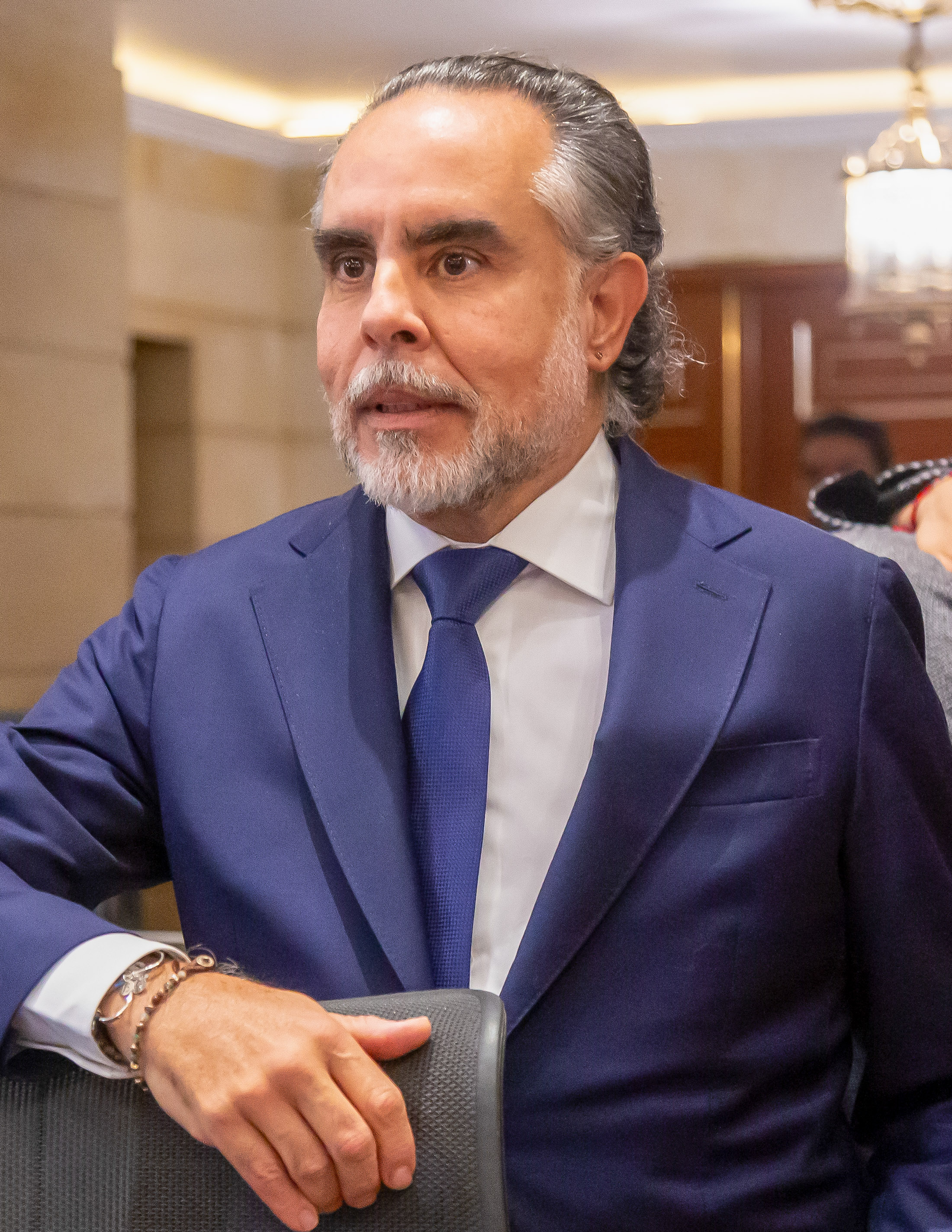
- Incumbent; Armando Benedetti since March 3, 2025
- Council of Ministers; Ministry of the Interior
- Style: Mr. Minister (informal); The Honorable (formal); His Excellency (diplomatic)
- Member of: Executive Branch; Legislative Branch; Administrative Department of the Nation
- Reports to: President of Colombia
- Seat: Bogota, D.C.
- Appointer: President of Colombia with Senate advice and consent
- Precursor: Secretary of the Interior
- Formation: July 27, 1789; 237 years ago
- First holder: Diego Bautista Urbaneja as Secretary of the Interior
- Succession: Line of succession
- Salary: Executive Schedule, COP$735,507,531,586 (2012); COP$342,642,573,034 (2013); COP$486,111,102,438 (2014)

The Minister of the Interior is a member of the executive branch of the government of Colombia and head of the Ministry of the Interior of Colombia. The incumbent is one of the highest-ranking members of the president's cabinet and will occupy the third position in the Colombian presidential line of succession within the Cabinet of Colombia.

Created in 1782 with Diego Bautista Urbaneja as its first office holder, the Minister of the Interior is responsible for Colombian domestic policy, as well as the formulation and defense of human rights. is appointed by the President of Colombia and acts at his discretion, defending and negotiating with Congress the respective interests of the presidential administration. The Minister of the Interior, along with the Minister of Foreign Affairs, the Minister of Finance, the Minister of Justice and the Minister of Defense, are generally considered the five most important cabinet members due to the importance of their respective ministries.

== Role ==
The position of Minister of the Interior has had an evolution throughout history, since its creation, the position of Minister of the Interior has gained great importance, being the first among the 5 most important positions in the national cabinet.

Between 1905 and 1994, with the absence of the figure of the Vice President, the Minister of the Interior, also called the Minister of Government, was the one who replaced the functions of the Vice President, acting on many occasions as president in charge. Currently, the functions of president in charge fall to the Minister of the Interior, since the latter is the first in the order of origin of government ministers, it is he who acts as president in charge in the temporary absences of the president on official trips abroad or vacations, since the constitution prohibits the vice president from being president in charge, in the aforementioned situations.
