= Administrative Department of the Presidency of the Republic =

- Departamento Administrativo de la Presidencia de la República

Agency overview
- Formed: 26 January 1956
- Preceding agency: Secretariat of the Presidency of the Republic
- Headquarters: Calle 7 No 6-54 Bogotá, D.C., Colombia
- Annual budget: COP$381,919,777,712 (2012); COP$259,047,362,457 (2013); COP$277,844,870,333 (2014)
- Agency executive: General Director
- Website: www.presidencia.gov.co

The Administrative Department of the Presidency of the Republic (Spanish: Departamento Administrativo de la Presidencia de la República, DAPRE) consists of the immediate staff of the President of Colombia, as well as multiple levels of support staff reporting to the President. The DAPRE is the Executive Administrative Department that assists the President in the exercise of its duties by lending the administrative support and related services to fulfil his official and constitutional duties.

== History ==
At the time of independence, the managing of the Office of the President consisted of a Private Secretary and a scribe. Law 3 of 1898 suppressed the offices of Private Secretary and Scribe, creating in place the Secretariat-General of the Presidency of the Republic (Secretaría General de la Presidencia de la República), made up of the Secretary-General, the High Officer, and two scribes.

By 1956, the need to provide the different offices of the President of the Republic a better organisation and to improve the efficacy in the fulfilment of presidential duties, forced the President to take action. On 27 January 1956, the Supreme General in Chief Gustavo Rojas Pinilla, issued Decree 133 of 1956, which transformed the General Secretariat into the Administrative Department of the Presidency of the Republic, as the agency in charge of coordinate, control and administrate the different dependencies of the Presidency.

Further changes were made during the administration of President Alfonso López Michelsen, who issued Decree 146 of 1976, on 7 January of said year, restructuring the agency into five departments, the General Secretariat, the Presidential Advisers, the Secretariat of Information and Press, the Private Secretary, and the Military House.

== See also ==
- President of Colombia
- National Planning Department
