= Antonio Sanguino =

Colombian politician (born 1965)

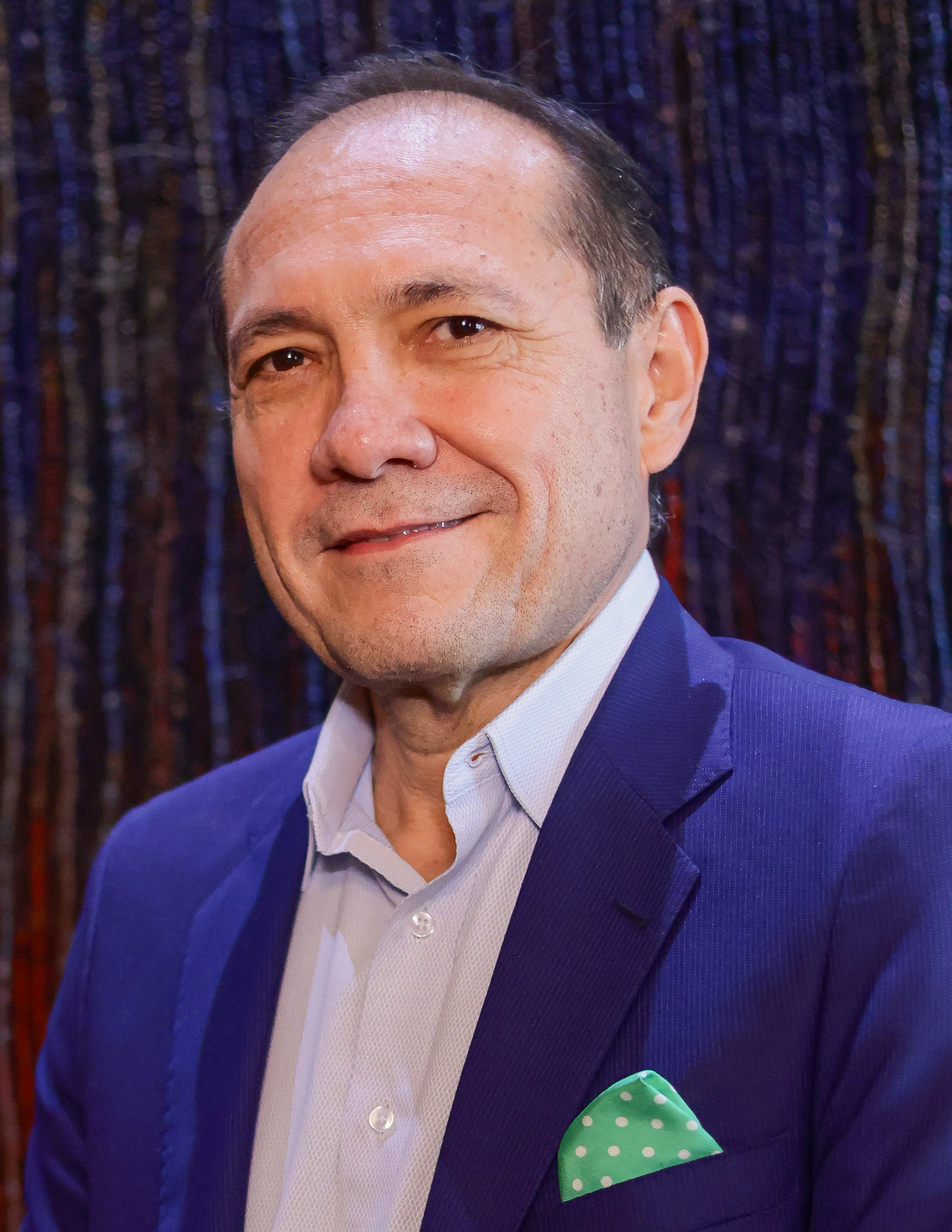
- Official portrait, 2025

Minister of Labour
- In office February 18, 2025 – August 7, 2026
- President: Gustavo Petro
- Preceded by: Gloria Inés Ramírez

Chief of Staff of the Superior Mayor of Bogotá
- In office July 21, 2022 – April 10, 2023
- Mayor: Claudia López
- Preceded by: Luis Ernesto Gómez
- Succeeded by: María Lucía Villalva

Senator of Colombia
- In office July 20, 2018 – July 20, 2022

Councilor of Bogotá
- In office January 1, 2008 – November 22, 2017
- Leader: María Fernanda Rojas

Personal details
- Born: Antonio Eresmid Sanguino Páez; June 1, 1965 (age 61) Ocaña, North Santander, Colombia
- Party: Green Alliance (2009-present)
- Other political affiliations: Alternative Democratic Pole (2007-2009)
- Education: Cooperative University of Colombia (BSocSc); University of the Andes (MSocSc); Complutense University of Madrid (MPA)
- Occupation: Politician; sociologist

Antonio Eresmid Sanguino Páez (born June 1, 1965) is a Colombian sociologist and politician who has served as Minister of Labour since 2025. A member of the Green Alliance party, he was also Chief of staff to the Mayor of Bogotá, Senator and Councilor of Bogotá.

Born in Ocaña, Norte de Santander, he is a sociologist and graduated from the Cooperative University of Colombia. He later served as a Councilor of Bogotá from 2008 to 2017, where he was a caucus leader from 2013 to 2016. He was elected Senator in 2018 and later, in 2022, was confirmed as Chief of Staff to the Mayor of Bogotá under Mayor Claudia López.

Political offices
Preceded by Luis Ernesto Gómez	Chief of Staff of the Superior Mayor of Bogotá; 2022–2023	Succeeded by María Lucía Villalva
Preceded by Gloria Inés Ramírez	Minister of Labour; 2025-2026	Incumbent
Order of precedence
Preceded by Guillermo Jaramillo as Minister of Health and Social Protection	Order of precedence of Colombia as Minister of Labour; February 18, 2025-August 7, 2026	Succeeded by Edwin Palma as Minister of Mines and Energy
