= Luis Carlos Rúa =

Colombian engineer, programmer and legislative adviser

Luis Carlos Rúa Sánchez
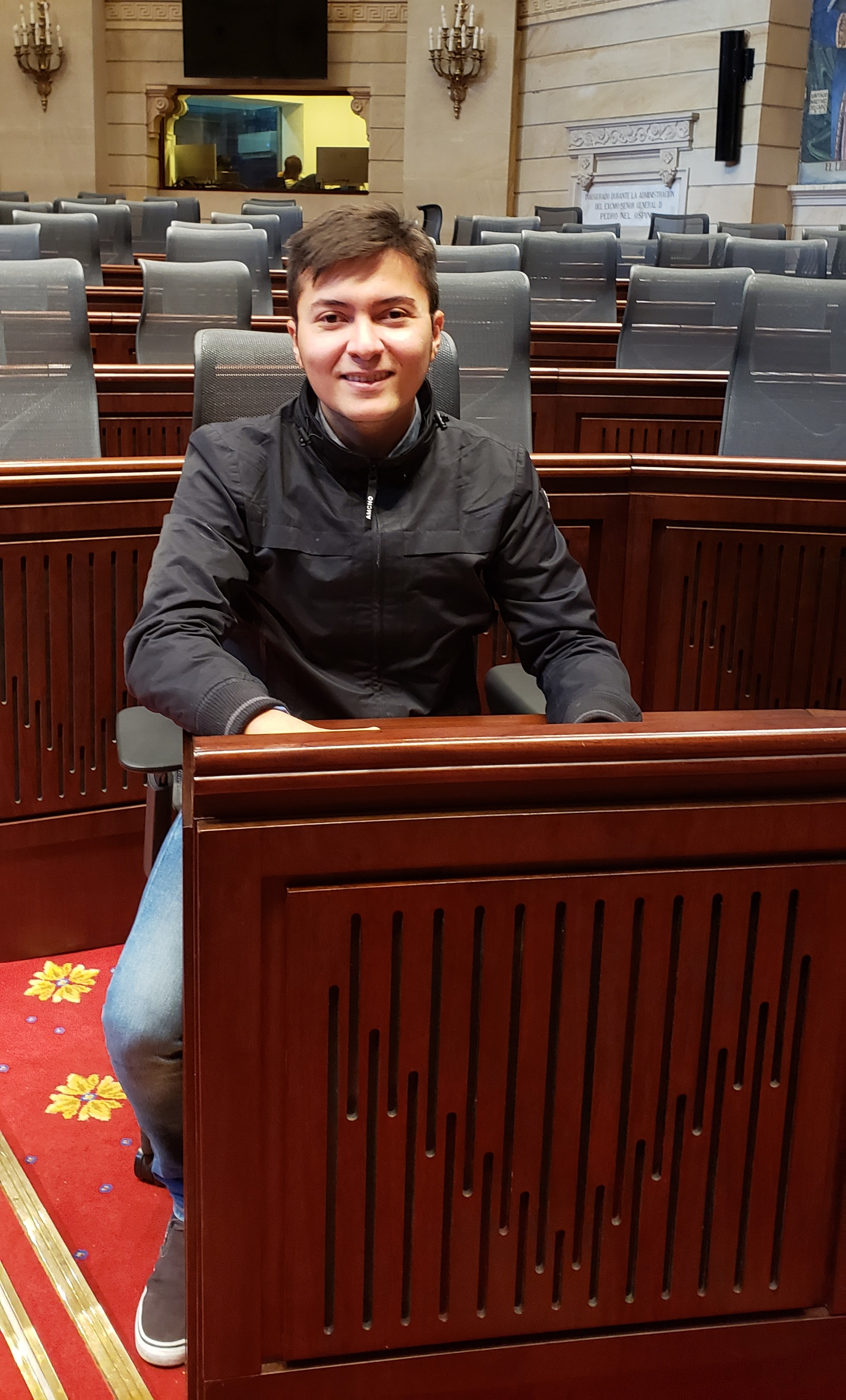

Senator of Colombia
- In office Elected

Personal details
- Born: 27 June 1992 (age 34) Pereira, Risaralda, Colombia
- Citizenship: Colombia
- Party: Coalición Alianza por Colombia
- Education: Universidad Tecnológica de Pereira
- Occupation: Senator, human rights defender, engineer, programmer

Luis Carlos Rúa Sánchez (Note: In this name that follows Hispanic American naming customs, the first or paternal surname is Rúa and the second or maternal family name is Sánchez.) (born 27 June 1992) is a Colombian programmer, educator, human rights defender, former legislative adviser in the Congress of Colombia and elected Senator for the 2026–2030 term. He is known for managing the completion of public works that have been dropped by the Colombian state, under an alias known as Elefante Blanco ("White Elephant").

Recently was included in the Time 100 risings starts from Time (magazine)

== Biography ==
Rúa was born into a family of peasant descent settled in the urban area of Pereira, made up of Darío Rúa, from Anorí, Antioquia, and Blanca Sánchez from Marsella, Risaralda. From an early age he was interested in academia and in the defense of human rights, holding school positions as academic head of his group, spokesman and aspiring to student representative although with no success at the Instituto Técnico Superior in 2008, where he graduated from high school a year later. When he entered university, he promoted a robotics seedbed with outstanding students from his college, focused on the social appropriation of knowledge and self-learning; this initiative was short-lived, apparently, due to the lack of a fixed financing and logistical capacity. He graduated as an engineer from the Universidad Tecnológica de Pereira, where he continued working as teacher, job started at 21 age in private institutions in the city. Also, he was precursor of initiatives such Colombia Consciente specialized on exposing citizen complaints, human rights defense and food sovereignty reaching international focus through different media like Fox Sports, Meganoticias and Rolling Stone.

== Kontacto ==
In 2019, while he was a university teacher and contractor at Pereira Mayor's Office, he denounced the existence of a system structured by a digital application hosted on that servers, fed by public employees of directive rank from various entities in the Area Metropolitana de Pereira, who forced their subordinates to guarantee at least 30 votes for keeping their jobs. This investigation was originally published by Cuestión Pública and La Cola de la Rata, to be later confirmed by the media Noticias Uno and Revista Semana. These facts, according to the Swedish NGO Qurium, specialized in computer forensics, constituted an habeas data violation, since 55,000 Pereirans' information was exposed for electoral purposes without the consent or authorization of registration in the Kontacto system of the big majority. In a similar sense, the Karisma Foundation confirmed alleged irregularities regarding the management of this information not complying with the principles as described in the Law 1581 of 2012 of Colombia, which regulate sensitive data processing. These events led to the suspension of Juan Pablo Gallo by the Procuraduría General de la Nación, upon finding proven the existence of the voice of the Mayor Gallo in a recording provided by Rúa to the Attorney General of Colombia and later to the journalist Diana Calderón, where his participation in politics was evident, generating a public dispute between the General Procurator of that time Fernando Carrillo Flórez and the former president César Gaviria Trujillo the Liberal Party President, for the criticism that Gaviria made of Carrillo's decision, describing it as: "arbitrary", against which Carrillo said: "arbitrary is to use disproportionate forces to make the voter a hostage using public treasury". A year later, these circumstances gave rise to the electoral annulment of the election of the candidate of his predecessor before the Tribunal Administrativo de Risaralda.

== Environmental defense ==
At the end of 2019, several environmental leaders were invited to an event organized by the Heinrich Böll Foundation in the city of Bogotá devised for the Design of Strategies for the Páramo de Santurbán defense, where Hermán Vergara, inhabitant of Támesis Antioquia and social leader, denounced some presumed dangers that it entailed for his region that included the municipality of Támesis, the mining investment in Quebradona of AngloGold Ashanti at the southeastern Antioquia, among them, the installation of a tailings dam just 2 km from the Cauca River, with similar construction characteristics to the one built in Brumadinho, Brazil, in the metropolitan region of Belo Horizonte whose collapse caused less environmental damage than that caused by the Mariana dam disaster but higher mortality, leaving at least 270 dead people. After hearing this complaint, Rúa, invited to the event, developed a public collection through social networks to finance an investigation in the area of influence of the project, seeking the support of several activists including the Colombian swimmer Jorge Iván del Valle, the singer Adriana Lucía, the Colombian actor Julián Román, the actress Carolina Guerra, among others. With the proceeds from the vaki he traveled to the area, where he settled for three months, documenting various residents testimonies, and generating a descriptive documentary, as well as an international complaint through Rolling Stone magazine against the presumed omissions of the ANLA and the looming threat. This because in Rúa's opinion, this project threatened the ecosystem and the water sources that supply it to 24 municipalities, as denounced in 2015 before Corantioquia by the oversight John Jairo Arcila of Jericó, without any news having about it that next 4 years in this regard. The consolidation of the media demonstrations promoted by Rúa during 9 months, with the help of other people, generated the closure of the project license of the powerful Multinational.

Rúa also developed other environmental complaints in Antioquia, such as the indiscriminate felling of trees that the Envigado Mayor's Office planned to carry out based on compliance with a valuation agreement worth 205 billion pesos, to allegedly decongest the municipality with the felling of more than 2000 trees. On that occasion, he accompanied and promoted various activities, such as staying up all night in the area, various performances, and citizen complaints as protest measures requesting other solutions that took care of the environment.

== Administrative morality ==
Among his complaints, Rúa has filed various lawsuits, requesting State entities to finish public works dropped, with alleged structural failures or with risks of collapse. Such is the case of the bridge between Ocaña and Agua Clara, where the Tribunal Administrativo de Cundinamarca ordered early preventive measures in this regard, as reported by the media, W Radio. On the other hand, he sued the Government of the Archipelago of San Andrés and Providencia for the abandonment for 8 years of the Megacolegio Antonia Santos, whose costs are higher to 49 billion pesos, a demand that gave rise to the opening of a disciplinary investigation against the current Governor of the island Everth Julio Hawkins and a subsequent tax liability ruling against his two predecessors in the administration of the island, Aury Guerrero Bowie and Ronald Housni Jaller.

== Controversies and threats ==
Since his complaints against the former mayor and current senator Juan Pablo Gallo, Rúa received death threats from people close to the former mayor, as the one performed by an edilesa forcing him to settle in Antioquia as a preventive measure, given the PNU refusal to provide him security guarantees to continue that investigations. On his part, his recent complaints against the Governor of San Andrés have meant insults and intimidation by San Andrés island's Governor.
