= Edwin Palma =

Colombian government official (born 1983)

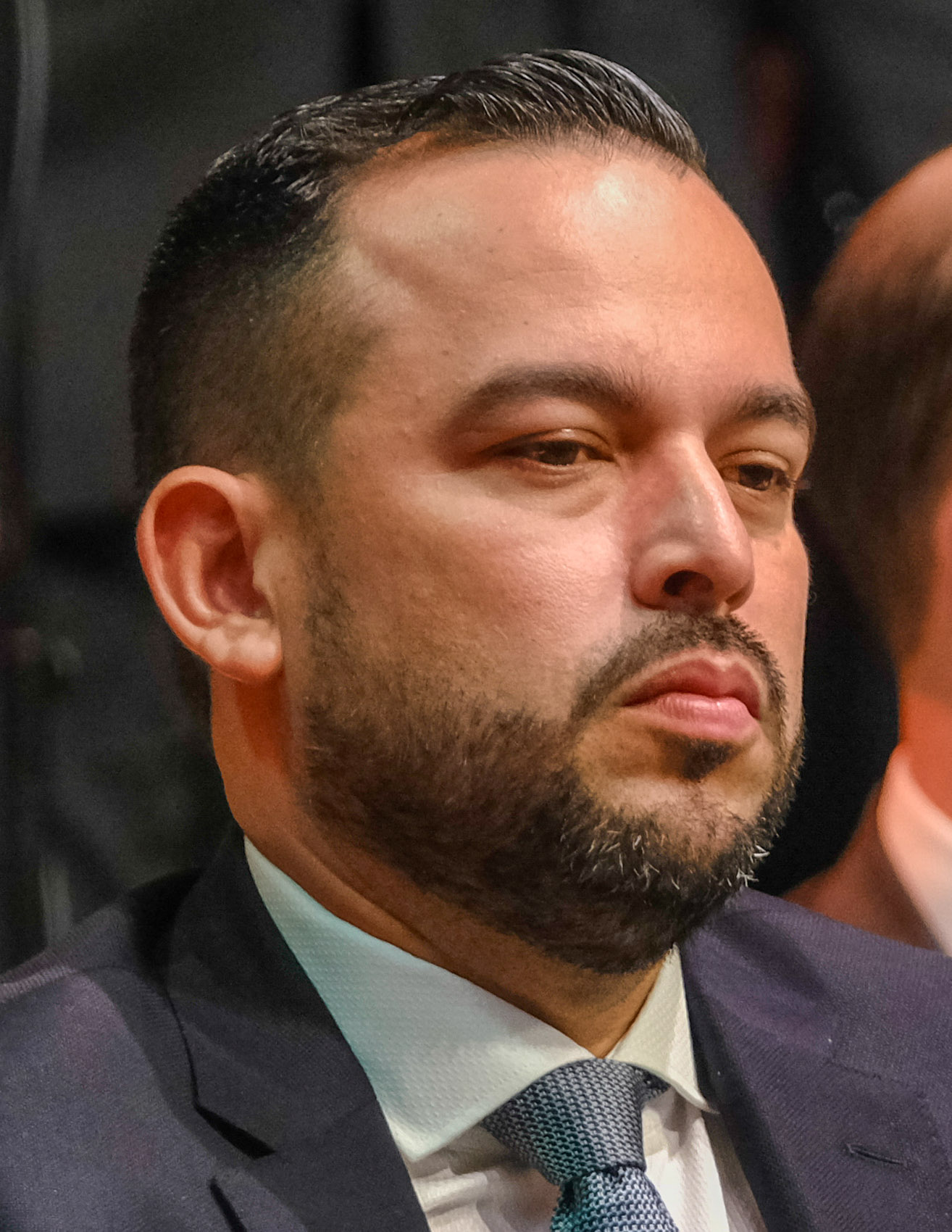

Minister of Mines and Energy
- In office 27 February 2025 – 7 August 2026
- President: Gustavo Petro
- Preceded by: Omar Andrés Camacho
- Succeeded by: María Nohemí Arboleda

Deputy Minister of Labor Relations and Inspection
- In office 7 September 2022 – 1 August 2024
- President: Gustavo Petro
- Preceded by: Unknown
- Succeeded by: Luisa Fernanda Gómez

Personal details
- Born: Edwin Palma; 6 September 1983 (age 42) Barrancabermeja, Colombia
- Party: Alternative Democratic Pole (2012-present)
- Other political affiliations: Historic Pact for Colombia (2021-present)
- Education: Cooperative University of Colombia

Edwin Palma Egea (born 6 September 1983) is a Colombian lawyer, union leader, and politician who served from 2022 to 2024 as Deputy Minister of Labor Relations and Inspection and currently, since 27 February 2025, as Minister of Mines and Energy.

Palma was born on 6 September 1983 in Barrancabermeja, Colombia. He is a lawyer with a degree from the Cooperative University of Colombia and served as president of the Unión Sindical Obrera from 2018 to 2022. He served as Deputy Minister of Labor Relations and Inspection from 2022 to 2024, when he was nominated and subsequently confirmed by President Gustavo Petro as Minister of Mines and Energy following the resignation of Omar Andrés Camacho.

Political offices
Preceded by Unknown	Deputy Minister of Labor Relations and Inspection; 2022–2024	Succeeded by Luisa Fernanda Gómez
Preceded by Omar Andrés Camacho	Minister of Mines and Energy; 2025–2026	Succeeded by María Nohemí Arboleda
Order of precedence
Preceded by Antonio Sanguino as Minister of Labour	Order of precedence of Colombia as Minister of Mines and Energy since 27 February 2025	Succeeded by Diana Morales as Minister of Commerce, Industry and Tourism
