= Aurelio Iragorri Valencia =

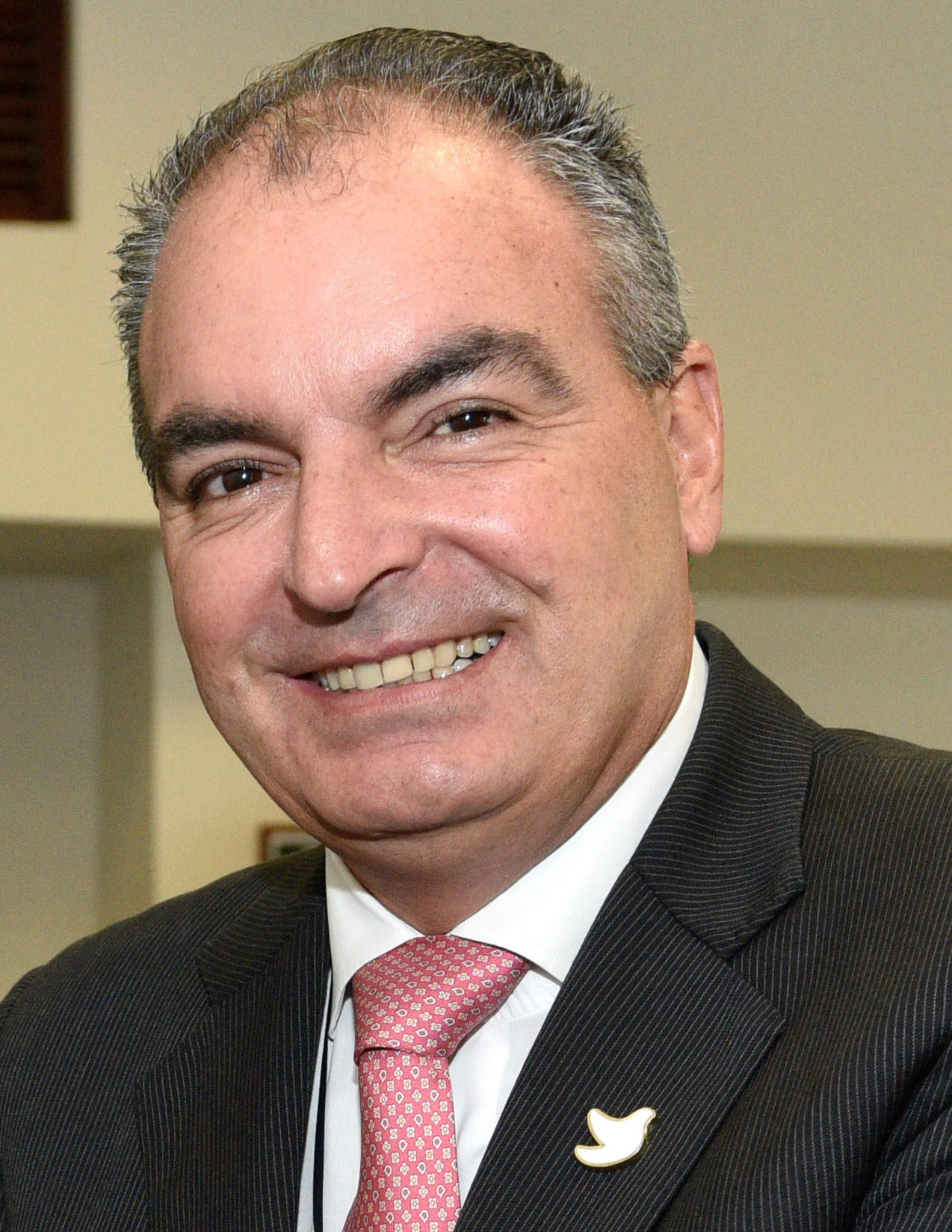

Minister of the Interior
- In office 11 September 2013 – 7 August 2018
- President: Juan Manuel Santos
- Preceded by: Fernando Carrillo Flórez
- Succeeded by: Juan Fernando Cristo

Chief of Staff of the Presidency
- In office 2 July 2013 – 11 September 2013
- President: Juan Manuel Santos
- Preceded by: Juan Rafael Mesa
- Succeeded by: María Lorena Gutiérrez

High Presidential Advisor for Political Affairs
- In office 8 February 2012 – 2 July 2013
- President: Juan Manuel Santos
- Preceded by: Germán Chica Giraldo
- Succeeded by: Faihan Al-Fayez Chaljub

Personal details
- Born: Aurelio Iragorri Valencia; 15 July 1966 (age 60) Popayán, Cauca, Colombia
- Party: Party of the U
- Spouse: Sonia Heilbron
- Children: Jorge Alejandro Iragorri Pulido; María Iragorri Pulido
- Education: Pontifical Xavierian University (LLB, 1991)

Aurelio Iragorri Valencia (born 15 July 1966) is the 12th Minister of the Interior of Colombia, serving in the administration of President Juan Manuel Santos Calderón. Iragorri, who had served as Deputy Minister of the Interior from 2010 to 2012, also served as Santos' Chief of Staff, and as High Presidential Advisor for Political Affairs.

== Career ==
Iragorri, a Pontifical Xavierian University educated lawyer, was appointed Deputy Minister of the Interior on 23 August 2010 serving under Minister Federico Renjifo Vélez in the administration of President Juan Manuel Santos Calderón. As Deputy Minister of the Interior, Iragorri was appointed acting Governor of Magdalena following the impeachment of Magdalena's elected governor, Omar Ricardo Díaz-Granados Velásquez, by the Office of the Comptroller General. Iragorri served only a few days, from 13 December to 29 December 2010, but shortly after, Iragorri was appointed acting Governor of Casanare following the impeachment of that department's elected governor, Oscar Raúl Iván Flórez Chávez, by the Office of the Inspector General. This time he served from 14 February to 11 April 2011.

On 11 August 2011, following a restructuring of the Ministry which divided the Ministry of the Interior and Justice into the Ministry of the Interior and the Ministry of Justice and Law, Iragorri's post changed nomenclature and went from Deputy Minister of the Interior to Deputy Minister of Political Affairs, within the Ministry of the Interior.

On 8 February 2012, Iragorri was appointed high presidential advisor for political affairs by President Santos. On 30 March 2012, Iragorri was once again appointed acting governor this time of Valle del Cauca, following the impeachment that department's elected governor, of Héctor Fabio Useche de la Cruz, by the Office of the Comptroller General.

On 2 July 2013, President Santos appointed Iragorri his chief of staff as director of the Administrative Department of the Presidency. Iragorri, however, only briefly remained in that position as on 5 September 2013, as part of a planned cabinet reshuffle, President Santos announced the appointment of Iragorri as the new minister of the interior. Iragorri was sworn in on 11 September succeeding Fernando Carrillo Flórez in the post.

== Personal life ==
Aurelio Iragorri Valencia was born on 15 July 1966 in Popayán to Jorge Aurelio Iragorri Hormaza and Diana Valencia López. His father was a Liberal party politician, and Senator; his mother was the daughter of President Guillermo León Valencia Muñoz. He is married to Sonia Heilbron with whom he has two children: Jorge Alejandro and María.
