= Tomás González Estrada =

Colombian economist

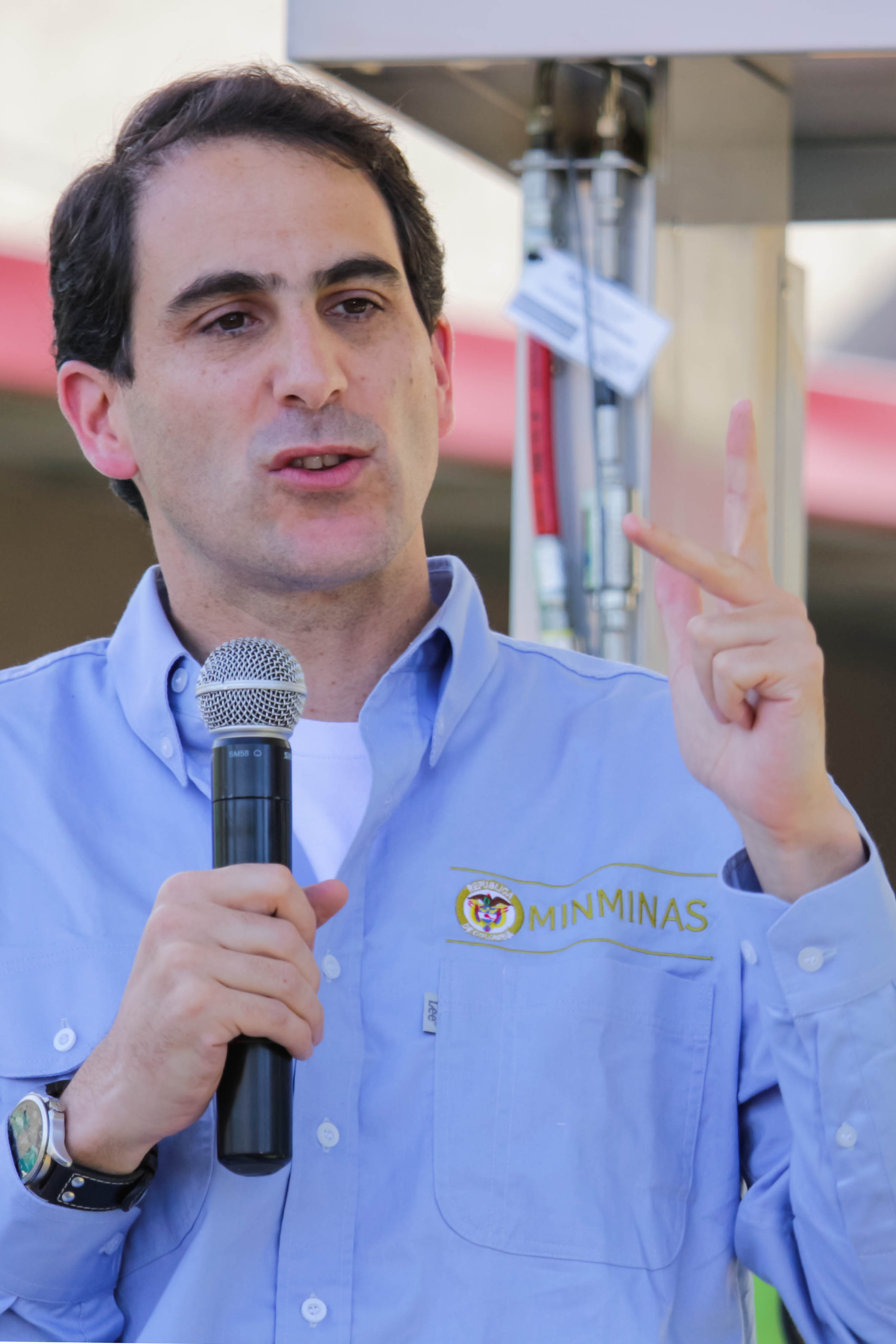

Minister of Mines and Energy of Colombia
- In office 11 August 2014 – 7 March 2016
- President: Juan Manuel Santos
- Preceded by: Amilkar Acosta
- Succeeded by: María Lorena Gutiérrez

Personal details
- Born: 1969 (age 56–57) Bogotá, Colombia
- Party: Colombian Conservative Party
- Education: University of London
- Occupation: Economist, politician

Tomás González Estrada (born 1969) is a Colombian economist. He was an Economic Counselor in the government of Andrés Pastrana Arango and the Minister of Mines and Energy in the second government of Juan Manuel Santos. On 7 March 2016, his resignation from the position was accepted due to the country's energy crisis by El Niño 2015-16 and the fire at Guatape power plant.

== Biography ==
González Estrada was born in Bogotá. He holds a master's degree from the University of Los Andes, with a Master's and Ph.D. in Economics from the University of London. He was a researcher and professor at the Faculty of Economics of the University of Los Andes.

== Political career ==
Tomás González was an Economic Counselor in the government of Andrés Pastrana from 1998 to 2000. From 2000 and 2002 he was Deputy Director of National Planning under the direction of Juan Carlos Echeverry. He has been technical secretary of the National Council of Economic and Social Policy (CONPES), External Affairs Manager of BP Colombia, member of the Council of Ministers, and a board member of ISA, ISAGEN, FEN, IPSE, and UPME.

González was appointed Deputy Minister of Mines and Energy under Ministers Carlos Rodado Noriega, Mauricio Cárdenas, and Federico Renjifo. He was program coordinator of the Good Government Foundation. In 2014, in the second term of Juan Manuel Santos, he was appointed Minister of Mines and Energy.

== Minister of Mines and Energy ==
Among González Estrada's initiatives were the elaboration and execution of Plan 5 Caribe – seeking to improve the provision of energy service in the Colombian Caribbean coast – the expansion and coverage for interconnected and non-interconnected areas of the country, and the production of crude oil in excess of one million barrels, that the country sustained for nine consecutive months for the first time in history. His pillars of management were supply, competitiveness, and equity.

In March 2016 the Inspector General of the Nation opened a formal disciplinary investigation against González for contracts made between the Presidency of the Republic and a polling company that was closed in January 2017.

He later served as Alternative Executive Director at the International Monetary Fund and is currently the Director of the Regional Center for Energy Studies CREE and teaches Energy Economics at University of Los Andes (Colombia).
