= Juan Pablo Gallo =

Colombian politician

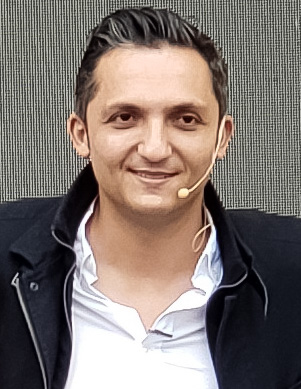

Mayor of Pereira
- Incumbent
- Assumed office 1 January 2016

Pereira municipal councillor
- In office 1 January 2008 – 13 April 2015

Personal details
- Born: 31 January 1979 (age 47) Pereira, Risaralda, Colombia
- Citizenship: Colombian
- Party: "Pereira Cambia"
- Education: Universidad Libre (Colombia) and Eafit University
- Occupation: Economist, politician
- Website: www.juanpablogallo.co

Juan Pablo Gallo Maya (born 31 January 1979) is a Colombian economist and politician and former mayor of Pereira since January 2016.

== Education, personal life and professional career ==
Juan Pablo Gallo was born in Pereira in 1979 to Silvio Gallo Santa and Luz Helena Maya. He is married to Lina Marcela Muñetón since.

He studied economics and at the Free University of Colombia and marketing at the Eafit. During his secondary studies, Gallo was interested in politics, and was elected as the spokesperson at school, and as youth municipal mayor (in 2004) while Juan Manuel Arango was Mayor.

== Politics career ==
Juan Began his life as the youth municipal councillor elected with 2,807, and re-elected with 5,841. where he promote the environment and animal wellness. In 2015 Gallo ran for mayor of Pereira winning with 126,075, supported by citizens and partisan coalition.

== Acknowledgments ==
On 28 March 2019, he was invited as a speaker to the Tax and Business Competitiveness forum organized in Ibagué, where authorities met in academic and economic matters. There he presented the public finance plan of his Government plan, in the framework of the recent unemployment figures. In addition to the appearance of the city in the international Doing Business Ranking during his tenure.

As Mayor to figure in the top positions of the National Ranking of Mayors, with Alejandro Char, Federico Gutiérrez and Rodolfo Hernández Suárez and Marcos Daniel Pineda.

== Controversies ==
He was suspended by Fernando Carrillo Flórez from the public ministry of colombia for three months without the right to remuneration, after he and his Kontacto system were denounced for constraining the voter by the engineer Luis Carlos Rúa, who show before the Attorney General of Colombia and to the “Procuraduría General de la Nación” which prevented him from finishing his term as mayor of the city.
