= Kontacto =

Corruption Case in Colombia

Kontacto is a case of Colombian national political corruption that began with the use of a system structured by a digital application and the logistical spread of around 1,500 contractors from various public entities, to favor the election of figures close to the Colombian Colombian Liberal Party in various corporations in the department of Risaralda, through coercion of public officials and contractors. Its operation was based on a pyramid scheme with the renewal of their public contracts promess, based on the volume of voters registered into the database managed from the Pereira mayor's office, according to the denominations of: Quarterback, Pitcher and Catcher. Evidence shows that up to 55,000 people from the Metropolitan Area were housed in the system, most of them without authorization and others with complete ignorance on it, as demonstrated by the Swedish computer forensics group Qurium in coordination with the media. Investigative Cuestión Pública and with the subsequent confirmation of the Karisma Foundation. This fact became known after a citizen complaint in 2019 regional elections performance, involving the former mayor of Pereira and today senator Juan Pablo Gallo, the current mayor Carlos Maya, the former representative of the Chamber Diego Naranjo Escobar, the company GoDaddy, the Office of the Attorney General of Colombia, Senator Samy Meregh and the former president and permanent leader of the Colombian Liberal Party César Gaviria Trujillo.

== Origin of complaints ==
As reported to Canal 1 by the citizen observer Crosthwaite, after denouncing a commercial promoted by the wife of Juan Pablo Gallo in favor of the candidate Carlos Maya in a committee of Electoral Guarantees, the Office of the Attorney General of Colombia opened a criminal notice against Gallo, ordering inquiries of several witnesses for constraining the voter and the power abuse of which they would have been victims in the midst of their work. In this way, several citizens and contractors were urged by the entity to offer their testimony, according to their consent and evidence provided, in relation to the pressure exerted by the mayor and public officials to use the logistics capacity of the Metropolitan Area in favor of Carlos Maya and Diego Naranjo Escobar, comments that to date they were only Vox Populi.

Despite the variety of testimonies, it was in the middle of an electoral debate organized by Caracol Radio and W Radio in the city of Pereira, that the professor and then contractor, Luis Carlos Rúa, delivered evidence to Caracol Radio journalist Diana Calderón, after having provided it to the General Prosecutor's Office through the chain of custody legal standard, without any sentence or judgment having been issued within the context of the case. The journalist, prior to publishing about it, confirmed the presence of his voice in the recording and his consequent improper participation in electoral politics, after call him, by the way publishing a fragment where, where the electoral pressure of the manager to subordinates was evident. For his part, Civil Engineer Carlos Alfredo Crosthwaite, pointed out that this behavior, denounced previously: "this was a modus operandi since several contractors had told me similar events", including in the Governor's Office. These testimonies were brought to the attention of the Prosecutor's Office Fernando Carrillo Flórez in the framework of the same process.

After the publication of the audio by Caracol Radio, then Fernando Carrillo suspended Mayor Juan Pablo Gallo, which triggered several pronouncements against Carrillo by the former President César Gaviria. Although Gaviria described the mayor's suspension as arbitrary, Carrillo did not change his decision, and withdrew Gallo early without the right to remuneration, in addition to replying: "what is arbitrary is to put pressure on the voter and make him a hostage to disproportionate forces that unbalance the terrain electoral". All facts reported by the Colombian press and international media such as El País of Spain.

== General Context ==
The application used for tracking, voter recruitment and voter constraint was developed by engineer Jhonny Castaño, contractor in 2004 of the branch of the Pereira mayor's office, Multiservicios, a period in which Juan Pablo Gallo was its manager. Likewise, he developed other contracts such as those signed in 2016 when Gallo was already mayor. Among them is one with an objective: ”Installation, implementation, training and production of a system to collect information on site and online” executed through the minimum amount modality and valued at 44 million pesos. A development with special similarity to the Kontacto interface, according to the investigative medium Cuestión Pública.

On the Secop platform, it can be confirmed that Castaño signed 6 contracts during the Gallo administration, and one after the election of Carlos Maya, including one developed during 2019 in order to develop Sondeox, an application valued at 95 million euros. pesos and which consisted of a system of manual collection of statistics through tablets in the territory. According to the NGO Qurium, it was the one with the greatest technological similarity to Kontacto. Castaño is also listed in the report on campaign income and expenses reported to the National Electoral Council for 2019 through the "clear accounts" platform.

== Detail Engineering ==
The Kontacto application was developed in the same development environment as Sondeox, using the Mobile development framework created by the French company, with the purpose of storing, addressing and tracking through data recording and GPS23 the vote of 55 thousand citizens of the Pereira Metropolitan Area, to favor candidates for various corporations in Risaralda. Its distribution took place through WhatsApp groups by all those involved, since it was not published on the Google Play Store, despite It is an application for Android and Computer. The domain of the Web application was registered with GoDaddy by Castaño on May 7, 2019, some 200 days before the development of the electoral contest.

== Controversies ==
Based on an out-of-court statement made by Luis Carlos Rúa to the lawyer Emerson Jaimes, an Electoral Nullity Action was filed, with which, in the first instance, the credentials of the successor of the mayor of Pereira Carlos Maya were suspended at the Administrative Court of Risaralda. The foregoing, after the Court included as evidence the testimonies of various officials and contractors of the immediately preceding administration. There it was found proven that public officials within various entities did exercise electoral functions with the urgency of their positions and hierarchy, among them Gallo, causing an imbalance in terms of the other candidates. Several of these officials had copies certified to control entities, while the new mayor's electoral credentials were annulled. Although the complete audio was in the hands of Fernando Carrillo Flórez, it was never delivered to the Court, even when he repeatedly requested it from the Prosecutor's Office. However, its public content allowed us to establish that the Kontacto system generated an influential imbalance in the victory of Carlos Maya and other regional candidates. However, the Council of State, in a controversial manner, assured that the audio with which the decision had been delivered did not have a chain of custody and therefore revoked the decision of the first instance, hinting that the office of a mayor's office was a semi-private and non-public space. In this regard, the lawyer Iván Cancino pointed out that the decision was quite dangerous by putting a fence to the citizen complaint.

== Restart of the investigation ==
The investigation slept on the shelves of the Attorney's Office in the hands of Prosecutor Marta Lozano for 4 years until the election of Juan Pablo Gallo as senator, which forced the Supreme Court of Justice to resume the case, this time in the hands of Judge Héctor Grannobles, who has developed the first hearings in this regard.

== Death threats to the complainant ==
As reported by the radio outlet Blu Radio, the complainant Luis Carlos Rúa received death threats from the mayor Dora Buitrago, a sympathizer and self-proclaimed beneficiary of aid from the Pereira mayor's office, apparently after a live in which Gallo mentioned the complainant. This, one day after the Mayor's live. However, after receiving the rejection of multiple citizens on social networks and media calls due to his threats, the mayor presented a public apology, which apparently prevented the threatened person from filing a criminal complaint against him.
