= Tomás González =

Tomás González may refer to:

- Tomás González (writer) (born 1950), Colombian writer
- Tomás González (sprinter) (born 1959), Cuban track and field sprinter
- Tomás Ruiz González (born 1963), Mexican politician and former director of the Mexican lottery
- Tomás González González (born 1968), Puerto Rican priest
- Tomás González Estrada (born 1969), Colombian economist and politician
- Tomás González (Paraguayan footballer) (born 1977)
- Tomás González (Spanish footballer) (born 1963)
- Tomás González (gymnast) (born 1985), Chilean gymnast
- Tomás González (basketball), player for Real Madrid Baloncesto

== See also ==
- Víctor Tomás (Victor Tomás González, born 1985), Spanish handball player
