= Quebradona =

Copper mine in Jericó Antioquia, Colombia

- Location of Quebradona in Colombia
- Location: Jericó, Antioquia, Antioquia, Colombia; 6.11°N 75.55°W
- Products: Gold
- Financial year: 2002
- Opened: 2002
- Company: AngloGold Ashanti

Quebradona is a Colombian copper mining venture in Jericó, Antioquia. It commenced in 2002, and is operated by South African multinational company AngloGold Ashanti.

Since its inception, the venture has been surrounded by controversies and complaints.

== General context ==
In 2002, in the midst of the mining promoted by former President Álvaro Uribe, several multinational mining companies including AngloGold Ashanti arrived in Colombia and with the aim of establishing greenfields projects in several municipalities in Southwestern Antioquia. They presented themselves to the communities as specialists in soil studies to improve agricultural conditions in the territory, according to several citizens. In this way, they obtained a mining exploration contract while offering job opportunities to the community through the territory mining exploitation. This was in response to the economic lags of the inhabitants, given the little state support in the area, which caused divides in the population. In general terms, there was no consensus on the project, since apparently it would bring some benefits and some long-term damage. Some civic leaders, such as Fernando Jaramillo, were opposed to the project. The oversight body of John Jairo Arcila expressed their displeasure, while city councilors, the president of the company in Colombia, and other public figures exposed the supposed increase of 1,700 million per year to 14,000 million per year that would take place if the project materialized.

== La Fea incident ==
In 2016, nearby residents reported that the La Fea creek site had developed a foul-smelling odour and unusually brown water. A community complaint was made to Corantioquia, the regional environmental protection agency. Local voices rallied for action from the authority in the following years, including Minister of Mines and Energy Jorge Eduardo Cock Londoño, environmental leader Fernando Jaramillo and university professor Luis Carlos Rúa, recognising that a resolution would be significant to the company's standing for a mining license that was being considered by the National Environmental Licensing Agency (ANLA). In 2021, Corantioquia found that the company had violated regulation by installing and operating an exploratory mining platform within the mandatory minimum distance allowed from the tributary. The company reportedly drilled 650m beneath the platform, which may have had a deleterious effect on the underground aquifers, although the authority emphasised that the penalty was solely for the distance violation. It was announced that the company would be fined $288 million pesos. Londoño appealed to increase the value of the fine, claiming that the sanction did not adequately reflect the dimension of the environmental damage caused.

== License Suspension ==
At the end of 2019, several environmental leaders were invited to an event organized between the Heinrich Böll Foundation and Renzo García in the city of Bogotá where the present the book "Huellas de la energía" and structured a conversation to avoid fracking for the Design of Strategies for the Defense of the Páramo de Santurbán, where Hermán Vergara, a resident of Támesis Antioquia and social leader, denounced some presumed dangers that it entailed his region that included the municipality of Támesis, AngloGold's mining commitment in Southeast Antioquia, among them the installation of a tailings dam 2 km from the Cauca River with characteristics similar to that of Brumadinho in Brazil whose collapse caused severe environmental damage, also leaving 270 people dead. After learning of this complaint, Luis Carlos Rúa, a guest at the event, developed a public collection through social networks to finance an investigation in the area of influence in the project. To do this, he sought the support of various activists, including Colombian swimmer Jorge Iván del Valle, singer Adriana Lucía, Colombian actor Julián Román, actress Carolina Guerra, among others. With the proceeds from the vaki, he traveled to the area, where he settled for three months, documenting various testimonies, resulting in a descriptive documentary and an international complaint through Rolling Stone against the alleged omissions of the ANLA that are against the threat, because in Rúa's concept, this project represented a threat to the ecosystem and the water sources that supply the vital liquid to 24 municipalities; This complaint had been in Corantioquia for 4 years without progress to date. The end of the demonstrations in networks promoted by Rúa, after more than 9 months of media pressure, finally coincided with the archiving of the project license of the powerful Multinational.

== Corruption reports ==
According to an audio published in the newspaper El Tiempo by John Jairo Arcila, the rector of the San Francisco de Asís Educational Institution in Jericó, informed the teachers of the offer that the AngloGold company made to 11th grade students to carry out a virtual pre-icfes, as well as an English course for the other grades, as support for the complaint. To access this offer, it was necessary to provide the data of the students by teacher as well as the telephone numbers of the parents. This fact was described as serious, by the professor of the Externado University Juan Carlos Upegui, who assured that the data could be used to profile and therefore discriminate against students whose families did not support said project, in an open violation of habeas data. The company responded indicating that it was an imprecision in the communication, since the call was not mandatory. According to other complaints, similar events would have taken place in other educational institutions in the municipality in 2019. On the other hand, some national figures who at the time supported the arrival of multinationals, today oppose the project, without the reason for their opposition is clear, as in the case of former President Uribe, who is said to have personal interests in the area.

== See also ==
- Mineral industry of Colombia
