= Amilkar Acosta Medina =

Columbian economist

Amilkar David Acosta Medina
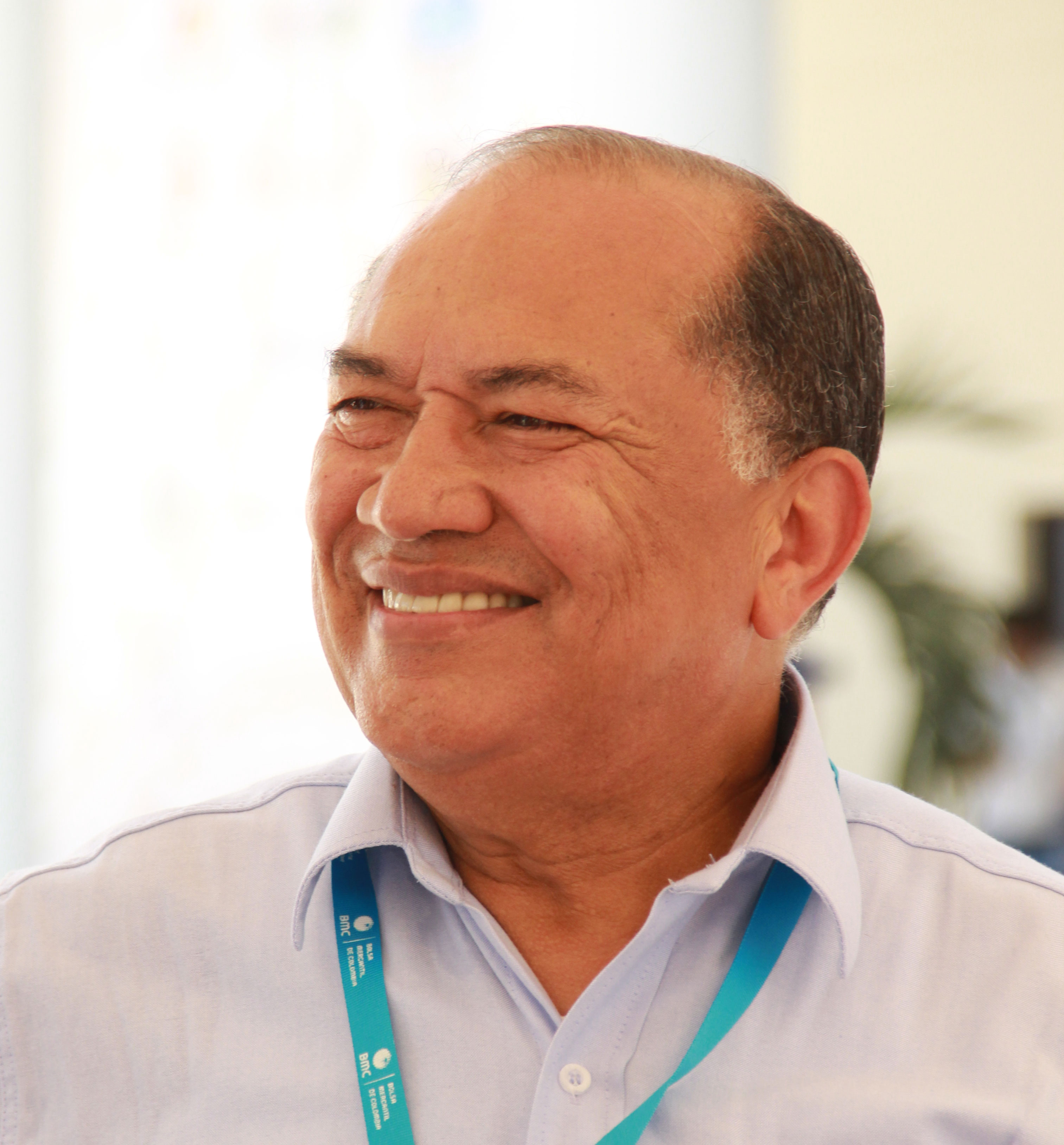
- Amylkar Acosta Medina

31st Minister of Mines and Energy of Colombia
- Incumbent
- Assumed office 11 September 2013
- President: Juan Manuel Santos Calderón
- Preceded by: Federico Renjifo Vélez

Senator of Colombia
- In office 12 December 1991 – 20 July 2002

President of the Senate of Colombia
- In office 20 July 1997 – 20 July 1998
- Preceded by: Luis Fernando Londoño Capurro
- Succeeded by: Fabio Valencia Cossio

Personal details
- Born: 1 November 1950 (age 75) Riohacha, La Guajira, Colombia
- Party: Liberal
- Spouse: Nydia Restrepo Herrera
- Children: Camilo Ernesto Acosta Restrepo; Juan David Acosta Restrepo
- Education: University of Antioquia
- Profession: Economist
- Website: www.amylkaracosta.net

Amilkar David Acosta Medina (born 1 November 1950) is a Colombian economist, and the 31st Minister of Mines and Energy of Colombia, serving in the administration of President Juan Manuel Santos Calderón. A former member of the Board of Directors of Ecopetrol and of the National Federation of Biofuels, Acosta was a professor of mining law at the Universidad Externado de Colombia, and had served as Deputy Minister of Mines and Energy from 1990 to 1991.

== Minister of Mines and Energy ==
On 5 September 2013, as part of a planned cabinet reshuffle, President Santos announced the appointment of Acosta as the new Minister of Mines and Energy. Acosta was sworn in on 11 September, succeeding Federico Renjifo Vélez in the post.
