= Omar Andrés Camacho =

Colombian physicist and politician (born 1981)

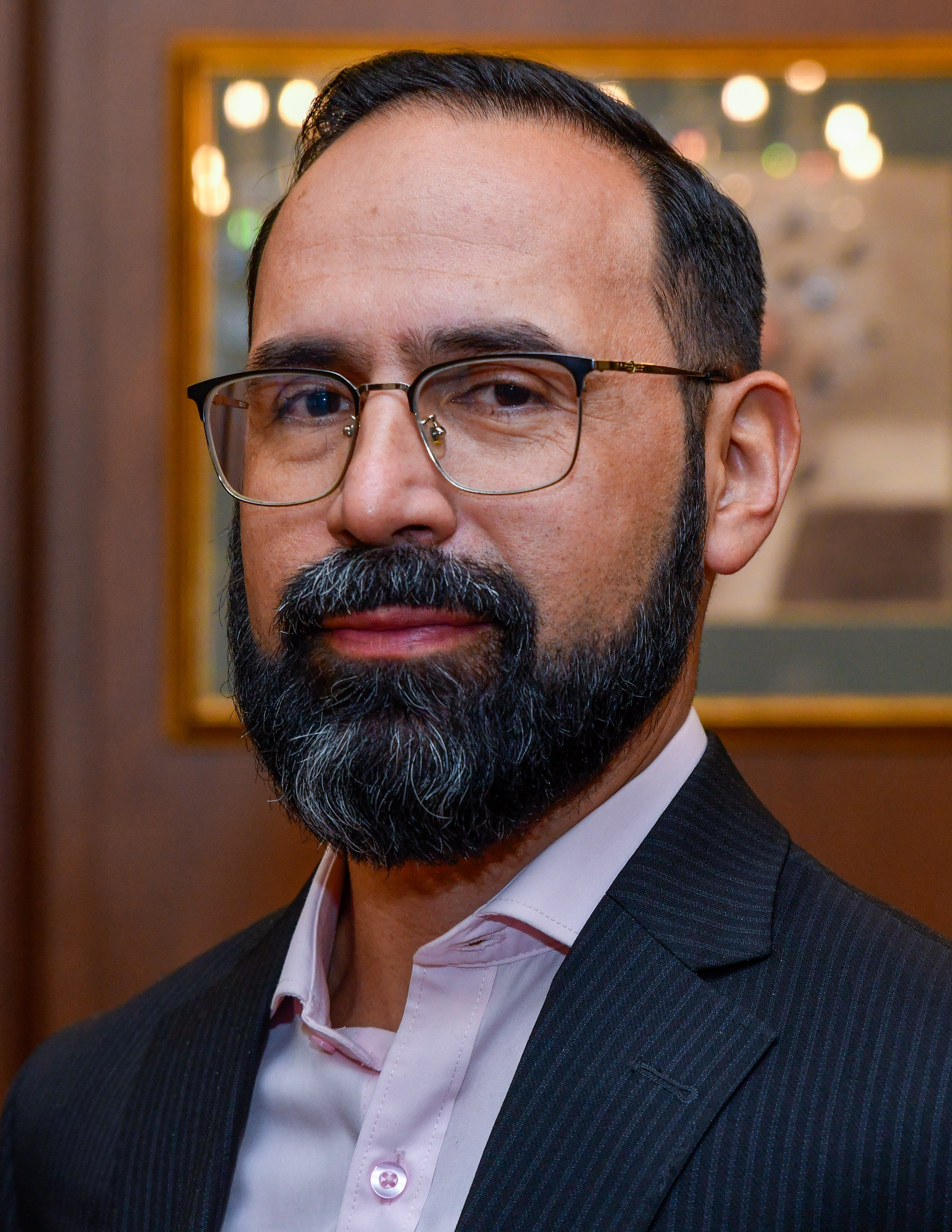
- Official portrait, 2023

Minister of Mines and Energy
- In office 4 August 2023 – 27 February 2025
- President: Gustavo Petro
- Preceded by: Irene Vélez
- Succeeded by: Edwin Palma

Member of the Chamber of Representatives
- In office July 20, 2018 – July 20, 2022
- Constituency: Capital District

Personal details
- Born: Omar Andrés Camacho Morales; May 21, 1981 (age 45) Bogotá, D.C., Colombia
- Party: Commons (since 2018)
- Other political affiliations: Historic Pact for Colombia (since 2021)
- Education: Francisco José de Caldas District University

Omar Andrés Camacho Morales (born 21 May 1981) is a Colombian physicist and political activist who served as Minister of Mines and Energy from 2023 to 2025 during the Petro administration.

Born in Bogotá, D.C., he studied Physics at the Francisco José de Caldas District University and later earned a master's degree in Energy Management and Renewable Sources from the Monterrey Institute of Technology and Higher Education in Mexico.

As a student, he participated in movements that demanded quality education in Colombia.

Political offices
Preceded by Irene Vélez	Minister of Mines and Energy; 2023–2025	Succeeded by Edwin Palma
Order of precedence
Preceded by Gloria Inés Ramírez as Minister of Labour	Order of precedence of Colombia as Minister of Mines and Energy since August 4, 2023	Succeeded by Luis Carlos Reyes as Minister of Commerce, Industry and Tourism
