= Irene Vélez Torres =

Colombian politician (born 1982)

Irene Vélez
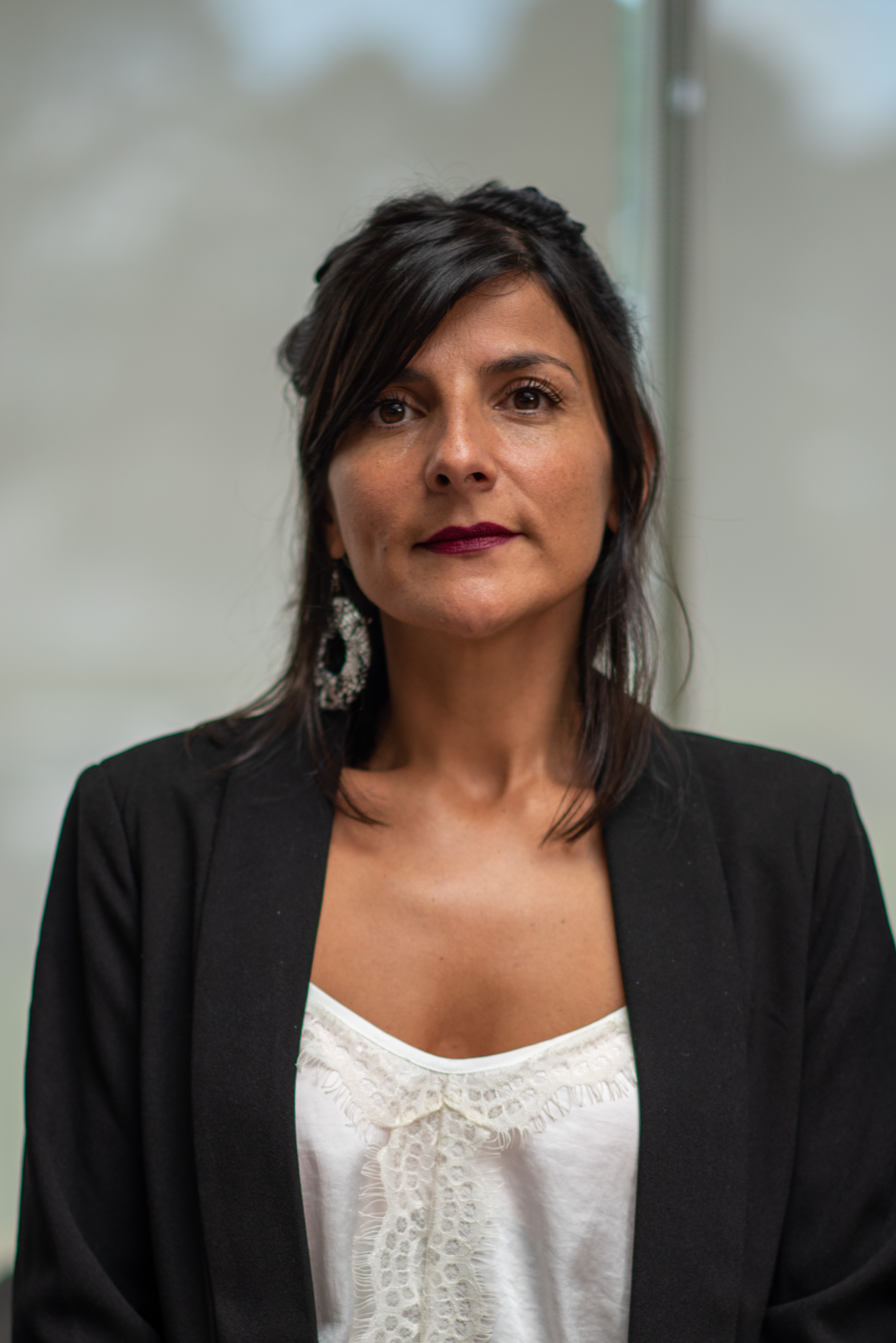
- Official portrait, 2022

Minister of Mines and Energy
- In office August 11, 2022 – July 19, 2023
- President: Gustavo Petro
- Preceded by: Diego Mesa Puyo
- Succeeded by: Omar Andrés Camacho

Personal details
- Born: Irene Vélez Torres; August 2, 1982 (age 44) Bogotá, D.C., Colombia
- Party: Soy Porque Somos (2020-present)
- Education: University of Copenhagen
- Profession: Philosopher; political geography
- Known for: Cónsul General for Colombia in United Kingdom (from June 2024-2025). Colombian National Environmental Agency director.

Irene Vélez Torres (born August 2, 1982) is a Colombian philosopher and doctor in political geography. She is currently Director of the Colombian National Environmental Agency. From June 2024-2025 she was the Colombian Cónsul General and Head of Mission in London, UK. From August 11, 2022, to July 19, 2023, she held the position of Minister of Mines and Energy.

== Early life ==
Irene Vélez is the daughter of Hildebrando Vélez, an environmentalist and educator recognized for his activism in the Black Communities Process through which he became very close to Francia Márquez. Vélez Torres studied philosophy at the National University, with a master's degree in cultural studies at the same university. She completed a doctorate in political geography at the University of Copenhagen in Denmark and has written on natural resource issues and environmental conflicts in Colombia

Vélez served as an environmental social leader against mining in Colombia, leading research related to the environmental impact of illegal mining on communities and energy transition models, and serving as a professor at the Faculty of Engineering of the University of Valle.

== Minister of Mines and Energy ==
In 2022, her name was suggested for Minister of Science and Technology in the government of Gustavo Petro, since she had been appointed as part of the joint team in that area by the previous government. On August 6, 2022, President-elect Gustavo Petro instead appointed her Minister of Mines and Energy.

Her appointment caused surprise due to Vélez's environmental activism and lack of connection to the extractivist energy sectors such as oil and coal. However the Petro government proposed an acceleration of the energy transition to make the country less and less dependent on non-renewable extractive energy with an increase in clean renewables.

After controversies, including two censure motions, she had to resign in June 2023, over a case of influence-peddling involving a migration officer who was pressured, allegedly, by Vélez to allow the departure of her son for Europe without complying with legal requirements. A charge of influence peddling is pending in the Colombian courts, as of 2024, as is a legal challenge to her appointment to a Consular diplomatic post in London ahead of other qualified candidates.

Political offices
Preceded by Diego Mesa Puyo	Minister of Mines and Energy; 2022–2023	Succeeded by Omar Andrés Camacho
Order of precedence
Preceded by Ángel Custodio Cabrera as Former Minister of Labour	Order of precedence of Colombia as Former Cabinet Member	Succeeded by María Ximena Lombana as Former Minister of Commerce, Industry and Tourism
