= María Fernanda Rojas =

Colombian government official (born 1974)

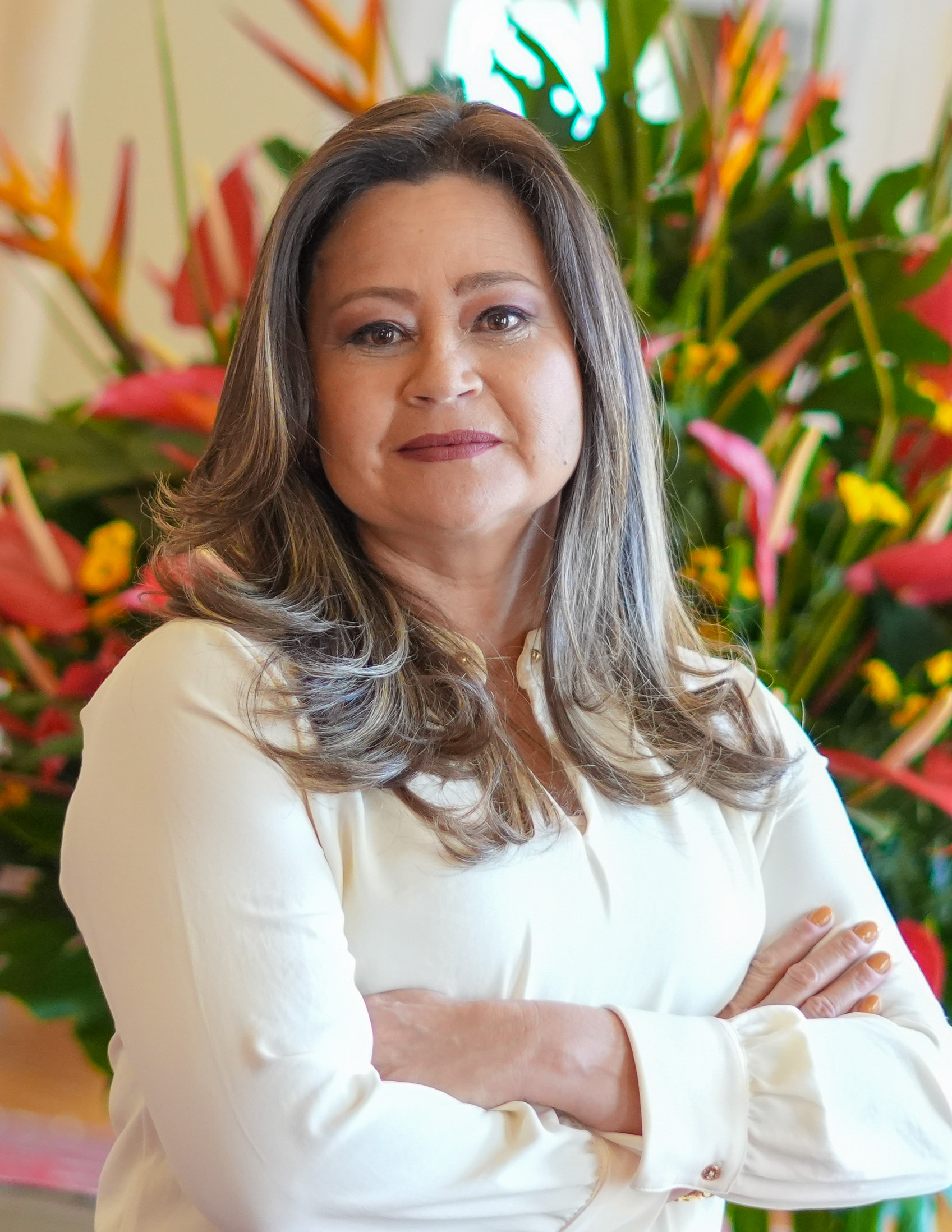
- Official portrait, 2025

Minister of Transport
- Incumbent
- Assumed office February 18, 2025
- President: Gustavo Petro
- Preceded by: María Constanza García

Deputy General Director of Social Prosperity for Programs and Projects
- In office April 5, 2024 – January 23, 2025
- President: Gustavo Petro
- General Director: Gustavo Bolívar
- Preceded by: Position established
- Succeeded by: José Luis Pastrana

President of the Bogotá City Council
- In office January 1, 2021 – January 1, 2022
- Preceded by: Carlos Fernando Galán
- Succeeded by: Samir Abisambra

Councilor of Bogotá
- In office December 5, 2017 – January 1, 2024
- Leader: Andrés Onzaga
- In office December 13, 2013 – January 1, 2016
- Leader: Antonio Sanguino

Personal details
- Born: María Fernanda Rojas Mantilla; May 12, 1974 (age 52) Villavicencio, Meta, Colombia
- Party: Green Alliance (2012-present)
- Education: University of La Sabana (BJ); Pontificia Universidad Javeriana (BLL); Externado University of Colombia (PS)
- Occupation: politician; political scientist; lawyer; journalist; social communicator

María Fernanda Rojas Mantilla (born May 12, 1974) is a Colombian political scientist, communicator, professor, lawyer and politician who has served as Councilor of Bogotá, President of the Bogotá City Council, Deputy General Director of Social Prosperity for Programs and Projects from 2024 to 2025 and since February 18, 2025 as Minister of Transport.

Born in Villavicencio, Meta, Matilla studied Social Communication and Journalism at the University of La Sabana, and later earned a master's degree in Analysis of Political, Economic, and International Problems at the Externado University of Colombia. Matilla is the granddaughter of Ramiro Mantilla, one of the most renowned journalists in Meta. In 2025, she completed a master's degree in Human Rights and International Humanitarian Law at Nebrija University.

Political offices
| Preceded by Carlos Fernando Galán | President of the Bogotá City Council; 2021–2022 | Succeeded by Samir Abisambra |
| Preceded by María Constanza García | Minister of Transport; 2025-present | Incumbent |
Order of precedence
| Preceded by Julián Molina as Minister of Information Technologies and Communications | Order of precedence of Colombia as Minister of Transport since February 18, 2025 | Succeeded by Yannai Kadamani as Minister of Culture |
