= Embassy of Colombia, Madrid =

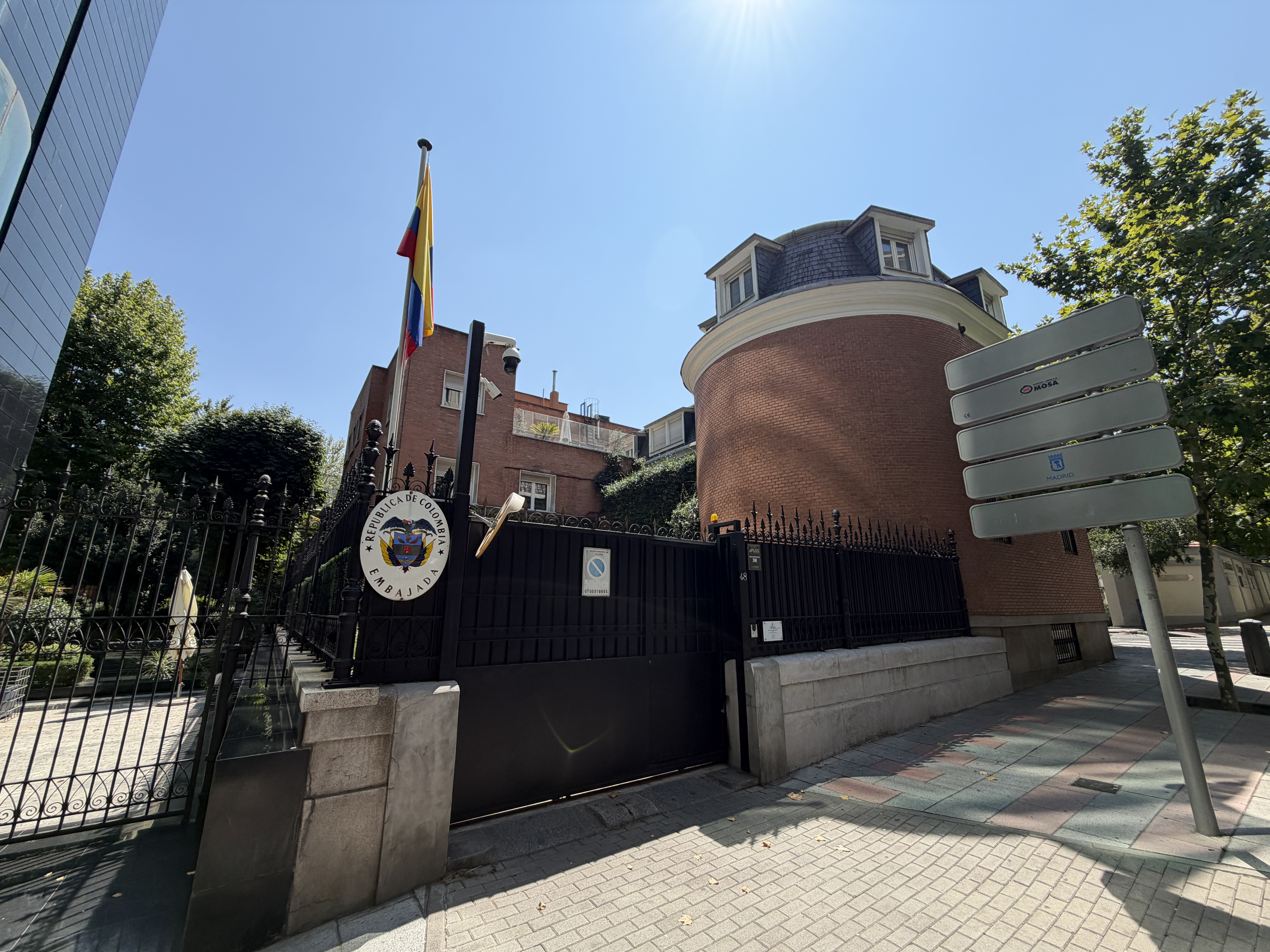
- Location: Salamanca
- Address: Paseo General Martínez Campos, 48; 28010 Madrid, Spain
- Coordinates: 40°26′06.20″N 3°41′24.0″W
- Ambassador: Orlando Sardi de Lima

The Embassy of Colombia in Madrid is the diplomatic mission of the Republic of Colombia to the Kingdom of Spain; it is headed by the Ambassador of Colombia to Spain. It is located in the Salamanca district of Madrid, near the Church of San Fermín de los Navarros, the Sorolla Museum, the IE Business School, and the Palace of Bermejillo, precisely at Paseo General Martínez Campos, 48 at the intersection of Calle Fortuny, and it is serviced by the Rubén Darío station.

The embassy is also accredited to the Principality of Andorra, the Kingdom of Morocco, and the Republic of Tunisia.

== See also ==
- Colombia–Spain relations
