= Fernando Carrillo Flórez =

Colombian lawyer

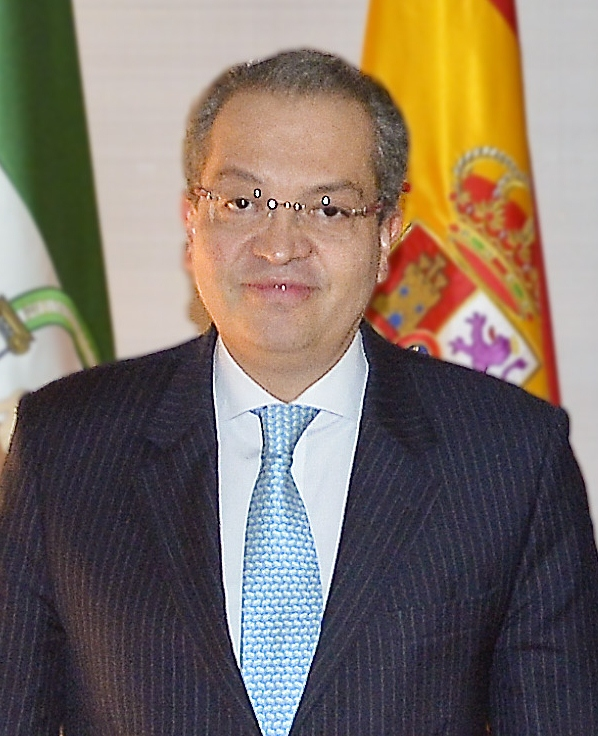

Colombia Ambassador to Spain
- Assuming office
- President: Juan Manuel Santos Calderón
- Succeeding: Orlando Sardi de Lima

Minister of the Interior
- In office 3 September 2012 – 11 September 2013
- President: Juan Manuel Santos Calderón
- Preceded by: Federico Renjifo Vélez
- Succeeded by: Aurelio Iragorri Valencia

Director of the National Legal Defence Agency of Colombia
- In office 15 March 2012 – 3 September 2012
- President: Juan Manuel Santos Calderón
- Succeeded by: Adriana María Guillén Arango

Ministry of Justice and Law
- In office 7 August 1991 – 29 June 1992
- President: César Gaviria Trujillo
- Preceded by: Jaime Giraldo Ángel

Personal details
- Born: 13 May 1963 Bogotá, D.C., Colombia
- Party: Liberal
- Other political affiliations: New Liberalism(1979-1986)
- Spouse(s): Diana Cristina Serpa Preciado (-present)
- Children: Laura Carrillo Serpa; Natalia Carrillo Serpa
- Education: Pontifical Xavierian University (BA, JD, 1985); Harvard University (LLM, 1987; MPA, 1994)
- Profession: Lawyer, Economist

Fernando Carrillo Flórez (born 13 May 1963) is a Pontifical Xavierian University educated lawyer and economist, with postgraduate studies from Harvard University. He served as Colombia's 11th Minister of the Interior from 2012 to 2013, and 55th Minister of Justice from 1991 to 1992.

== Academic career ==
Carrillo attended the Cervantes Lyceum from where he graduated in 1978, he then went on to College at the Pontifical Xavierian University from where graduated summa cum laude with a Bachelor of Economics and a Juris Doctor; his thesis, Sector Financiero y Delincuencia Económica (Financial Sector and Economic Delinquency), co-authored with Jorge Pinzon Sanchez, was published by Editorial Temis Librería. Carrillo pursued further studies in the United States attending Harvard Law School where he earned a Master of Laws in 1987, and returned in the 90's earning a Master of Public Administration from the John F. Kennedy School of Government in 1994.

Right out off college Carrillo began teaching at his alma mater as Professor of Constitutional Law; he also been Professor of Public Finance at Our Lady of the Rosary University, and the University of La Sabana; Professor of Commercial Law at the University of the Andes, Saint Thomas Aquinas University, and ICESI University; and visiting scholar at various other institutions including Sciences Po, University of Paris III: Sorbonne Nouvelle, American University, and the Charles III University of Madrid.

On 13 September 2012 Carrillo was named Corresponding Member of the Colombian Academy of Jurisprudence.

== Political career ==
=== Constituent Assembly ===
On 7 August 1990, the newly inaugurated President of Colombia, César Gaviria Trujillo, appointed Carrillo as Presidential Adviser on Constituent Assembly Matters. Because of constitutional restrictions on sitting officials, Carrillo resigned his post to run for a seat in the Constituent Assembly, feat that he managed when the elections were held in December. On 5 February 1991 the National Constituent Assembly was convened with Carrillo as a member.

=== Ministry of Justice ===
On 6 August 1991 President Gaviria appointed Carrillo as Minister of Justice. Carrillo, who at the time was serving as Assemblyman and Chairman of the Justice Committee of the Constituent Assembly, was replaced as Chairperson by Assemblywoman Martha Lucía Pinzón Galán.

=== Inter-American Development Bank ===
After Carrillo resigned as Minister of Justice, he travelled to the United States to study at Harvard, this would mark the beginning of a 20-year hiatus from public service choosing to remain in the private sector in international circles, an absence that was felt among certain political sectors that wished his returns to the political scene. In 1994, he joined the Inter-American Development Bank (IDB). He was the Chief Advisor to the State, Governance and Civil Society Division at the IDB headquarters in Washington, D.C. between 1994 and 2003; IDB's representative and spokesperson at the Permanent Council of the Organization of American States between 1996 and 2003; and Alternate Representative of the Inter-American Development Bank in Paris between 2003 and 2010.

=== National Legal Defence Agency ===
On 24 January 2012 during the inauguration of Beatriz Londoño Soto as Minister of Health and Social Protection, President Juan Manuel Santos Calderón announced the designation of Carrillo as Director of the National Legal Defence Agency, a newly created executive agency ascribed to the Ministry of Justice and Law, and charged with coordinating, organizing, and structuring the country's legal defence, and whenever possible, avoid damages to the State's assets. Carrillo, who at the time was working as Head Representative of the IDB in Brazil, had worked for Santos in his presidential campaign as Head of the Presidential Transition Committee after the election. On 15 March, President Santos sworn in Carrillo as the National Legal Defence Agency's 1st Director in a ceremony at the Palace of Nariño.

=== Ministry of the Interior ===
On 31 August 2012, President Santos announced a reshuffle of his Cabinet, and as part of this changes Carrillo was named Minister of the Interior replacing Federico Renjifo Vélez who in turn had been moved to be Minister of Mines and Energy.; Carrillo and five other new ministers were sworn in three days later on 3 September at a ceremony in the Palace of Nariño.

=== Ambassadorship ===
The day after his resignation, President Santos announced the designation of Carrillo to succeed Orlando Sardi de Lima as Ambassador of Colombia to Spain.

== Personal life ==
Fernando was born on 13 May 1963 in Bogotá, Colombia to Rafael Carrillo Piñeros and Adelia Flórez. He is married to Diana Cristina Serpa Preciado with whom he has two daughters, Laura and Natalia.

== Selected works ==
- Binetti, Carlo; Carrillo Flórez, Fernando, eds. (2005). An Unequal Democracy? Seeing Latin America through European Eyes. Washington, D.C.: Inter-American Development Bank. ISBN 9781597820196. OCLC 613391925.
- Carrillo Flórez, Fernando, ed. (2001). Democracia en Déficit: Gobernabilidad y Desarrollo en América Latina y el Caribe (in Spanish). Washington, D.C.: Inter-American Development Bank. ISBN 9781886938908. OCLC 491704946.
- Jarquín Calderón, Edmundo; Carrillo Flórez, Fernando, eds. (1998). Justice Delayed: Judicial Reform in Latin America. Washington, D.C.: Inter-American Development Bank. ISBN 9781886938298. OCLC 39340158.
- Carrillo Flórez, Fernando; Pinzón Sánchez, Jorge (1985). Sector Financiero y Delincuencia Eeconómica (in Spanish). Bogotá: Editorial Temis Librería. ISBN 9789586040730. OCLC 14214345.
