= Orlando Sardi de Lima =

Colombian politician and diplomat (born 1950)

Orlando Sardi De Lima

Colombia Ambassador to Spain
- In office 10 January 2011 – 2013
- President: Juan Manuel Santos
- Preceded by: Carlos Rodado Noriega
- Succeeded by: Fernando Carrillo Flórez

Colombia Ambassador to Andorra
- Incumbent
- Assumed office 9 March 2011
- President: Juan Manuel Santos
- Preceded by: Carlos Rodado Noriega

President of Proexport
- In office 15 September 1998 – 1 October 2000
- President: Andrés Pastrana Arango
- Preceded by: Lázaro Mejía Arango
- Succeeded by: Angela María Orozco Gómez

Personal details
- Born: 15 August 1950 (age 76) Cali, Valle del Cauca, Colombia
- Spouse: Stella Aristizábal
- Children: Felipe Sardi Aristizábal; Juan Carlos Sardi Aristizábal; Daniel Sardi Aristizábal
- Education: University of Puerto Rico at Mayagüez (BScAg)
- Profession: Agricultural Engineer

Orlando Sardi de Lima (born 15 August 1950 in Cali, Colombia) is the current Ambassador of Colombia to Spain with dual accreditation to the Colombian missions in Andorra, Algeria and Morocco. An agricultural engineer from the University of Puerto Rico at Mayagüez, Sardi has also served as President of Proexport from 1998 to 2000, and has been in the directives of various private and public firms including Winchester Oil & Gas, Comagro, Banco Ganadero S.A, Bancóldex, and the Colombian Institute of Agricultural Marketing (Idema), he also worked in the presidential campaigns of Andrés Pastrana Arango, and Juan Manuel Santos.

== See also ==
- Germán Santamaría Barragán
