= Federico Renjifo Vélez =

Colombian lawyer, economist and diplomat

Federico Alonso Renjifo Vélez

Colombia Ambassador to France
- In office 5 November 2013 – 7 August 2018
- President: Juan Manuel Santos
- Preceded by: Gustavo Adolfo Carvajal
- Succeeded by: Viviane Morales

Minister of Mines and Energy
- In office 3 September 2012 – 13 September 2013
- President: Juan Manuel Santos
- Preceded by: Mauricio Cárdenas
- Succeeded by: Amilkar Acosta Medina

Minister of the Interior
- In office 17 May 2012 – 3 September 2012
- President: Juan Manuel Santos
- Preceded by: Germán Vargas Lleras
- Succeeded by: Fernando Carrillo Flórez

Secretary General of the Presidency
- In office 8 September 2011 – 17 May 2012
- President: Juan Manuel Santos
- Preceded by: Juan Carlos Pinzón Bueno
- Succeeded by: Juan Mesa Zuleta

Personal details
- Born: Cali, Cauca Valley, Colombia
- Party: Liberal
- Spouse(s): Catalina Crane Arango (-present)
- Education: Pontifical Xavierian University (JD, 1981)
- Profession: Lawyer, Economist

Federico Alonso Renjifo Vélez is the 25th Ambassador of Colombia to France dually accredited as Non-Resident Ambassador of Colombia to Algeria and Monaco. A Colombian lawyer and economist, he also served as the 30th Minister of Mines and Energy, and 10th Minister of the Interior.

== Personal life ==
Federico Alonso was born in Cali, Valle del Cauca; the eldest of two sons of Marino Renjifo Salcedo and Amparo Vélez Hoyos; his younger brother is named Alejandro. He attended the Colegio Berchmans of Cali where he graduated in 1971. He went on to study at the Pontifical Xavierian University in Bogotá where he ultimately received his Doctorate of Laws and Socioeconomics with his co-authored doctoral thesis Ley Marco in 1981.

He is married to Catalina Crane Arango who is serving as High Presidential Advisor for Public and Private Management.

== Career ==
=== General Secretary to the President ===
On 1 September 2011 President Juan Manuel Santos Calderón announced the designation of Renjifo to succeed Juan Carlos Pinzón Bueno as General Secretary to the President as the new Director of the Administrative Department of the Presidency of the Republic Renjifo, who at the time was working as President of the Fiduciaries Association since 2002, was sworn in on 8 September 2011.

=== Minister of the Interior ===
On 25 April 2012 President Santos designated Renjifo to succeed Germán Vargas Lleras in the Ministry of the Interior; he was later sworn in as Minister of the Interior on 17 May 2012 at an official ceremony at the Palace of Nariño.

On 3 September 2012, Renjifo was appointed Minister of Mines and Energy, succeeding Mauricio Cárdenas who moved to the Finance Ministry. He also served concurrently as a board member of state oil company Ecopetrol. During his tenure, Colombia's oil reserves increased by 5.22% from 2011 to 2012, reaching a net gain of 464 million barrels, driven by an exploration effort that included 135 exploratory blocks granted in 2012. He oversaw the auction of 115 oil blocks in the Ronda Colombia 2012 round and signed 55 new oil contracts, with planned investment in exploration exceeding $2.6 billion. He was succeeded as minister by Amilkar Acosta Medina in September 2013, after which President Santos appointed him Ambassador of Colombia to France, a post he held from November 2013 to August 2018.
