= Jorge Iván del Valle =

Colombian swimmer

Jorge Iván
Personal information
- Full name: Jorge Iván Agudelo Vargas
- Nationality: Colombian
- Born: August 10, 1991 (age 34) Tuluá, Colombia

Sport
- Sport: Swimming

Jorge Iván Agudelo (Tuluá, Valle del Cauca, August 10, 1991) is a Colombian human rights activist, open water swimmer and a graphic designer. He is currently the first Colombian to cross swimming Santa Catalina channel and the Kaiwi Channel.

== Biography ==
In the middle of a recreational vacation with his parents at the age of 4, his Swimming teacher discovered his affinity with Water, which had gone unnoticed by them changing the soccer for swimming. Since early age, his mother enrolled him in backstroke and freestyle swimming modes, winning some national and regional medals, activities he had to reduce at 16 to study graphic design at the Universidad del Área Andina in the city of Pereira, and after at Universidad Autónoma de Cali. As a result of his controversial opinions against the Government of Iván Duque and the administration of public sports money, several sponsorships were canceled, which led Agudelo to perform several campaigns based on his social networks to finance his sports activity, lots of them including travels abroad. Agudelo organized several campaigns to self finance its competitions, including the sale of handles and cushions over the Internet. In this last purpose, he had the support of his grandmother Rosita who made the cushions. The latter in the development of the Master Sudamericano championship in Argentina in 2019, a competition where he was champion. Two years later he won two medals (a bronze and a silver) in the United States in the Masters of Swimming category. Together with his grandmother, he opened the Rosita Foundation to help young people affected by the armed conflict.

== Triple Crown of Open Water ==
=== Context ===
After being exiled from Colombia, he settled in the city of San Francisco, where he announced his continuity in sports activity with his aspiration to reach the Triple Crown of Open Water Swimming, a recognition that can be accessed by managing to cross swimming The English Channel, The Santa Catalina Island (California), and the Manhattan Island Marathon Swim, routes with lengths of 33.7 km, 32.5 km and 48.5 km respectively, not including the waves that lengthen the distances.

Currently, he is also training to participate in the challenge Oceans Seven challenge.

=== First Crown ===
According to the KienyKe.com Agudelo is the first Colombian to swim across the Catalina Channel, where he covered about 34 continuous km, counting on the supervision and accompaniment of the trainer Nora Toledano, the first Latin American woman to cross 7 seas swimming.

=== Second Crown ===
One month after obtaining his first crown, on August 28, 2022, he crossed the island of Manhattan, passing under the 20 bridges of New York City after 8 hours, 20 minutes and a journey along more than 50 km.

== Threats of Death ==
According to several media, Jorge Iván would have been the victim of physical attacks and death threats against his life and that of his mother while he was going back at night to his home in Tuluá. Under this argument, he left the country, moving to the United States where he continues with his sports activity and sports activism.

== Controversies ==
During the 2019 National Games held in the Cartagena aquatic complex, he was expelled by the public force for erecting a banner with messages of support for the national strike, while criticizing the administration of sports resources and the little support of its leaders for the emerging athletes, qualifying his management as quite negligent.

Episodes like this were frequent in his competitions or events, where he expressed his dissatisfaction with the performance of the sports leadership in the Government of Iván Duque. Apparently, these events led to the loss of his sponsors.

Jorge Iván also denounced alleged behaviors of harassment and corruption within the Colombian Swimming Federation, without such public complaints having materialized to date.
