= Cooperative University of Colombia =

Private institution of higher education

- Universidad Cooperativa de Colombia
- Motto: «Una Universidad, todo un país»
- Motto in English: «A University, an entire country»
- Type: Private
- Active: November 7, 1964; 61 years ago – 2001; 25 years ago
- Rector: César Augusto Pérez González
- Academic staff: 4,712
- Administrative staff: 2,447
- Students: 52,000
- Location: Colombia
- Website: http://www.ucc.edu.co/

The Cooperative University of Colombia (Spanish: Universidad Cooperativa de Colombia) is a private institution of higher education founded in 1983, as a successor of the Instituto de Economía Social y Cooperativismo (Indesco).

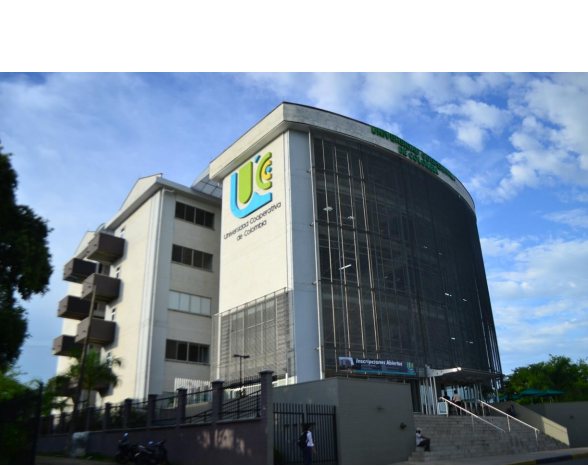

== Locations ==
The Cooperative University is characterized by its wide distribution nationally, with 18 campuses around the country in Apartadó, Arauca, Barrancabermeja, Bogotá, Bucaramanga, Cali, Cartago, Espinal, Ibagué, Medellín, Montería, Neiva, Pasto, Pereira, Popayán, Quibdó, Santa Marta and Villavicencio.

== The Controversy of the Cooperativa de Colombia in Ecuador ==
The Cooperativa de Colombia, a private university based in Colombia, established a branch campus in Ecuador in the late 1990s. However, this branch campus soon became embroiled in controversy over the legitimacy of the degrees and diplomas it was issuing.

In the early 2000s, it was revealed that the Cooperativa de Colombia's Ecuador campus had been issuing diplomas and degrees without proper authorization from the Ecuadorian government. An investigation by the Ecuadorian Attorney General's office found that many students at the Cooperativa de Colombia campus had obtained their degrees through fraudulent means, such as purchasing fake diplomas.

As a result of these findings, the Ecuadorian government took action to shut down the Cooperativa de Colombia's operations in the country. In 2001, the Ecuadorian government officially closed down the Cooperativa de Colombia campus, citing the lack of proper accreditation and the widespread issuance of fraudulent degrees.

The closure of the Cooperativa de Colombia campus led to a major crisis for the thousands of students who had enrolled there, many of whom had their degrees and diplomas invalidated by the Ecuadorian government. The Ecuadorian Council of Higher Education (CES) later had to undertake a lengthy process to regularize the academic records of former Cooperativa de Colombia students, in order to allow them to continue their studies at other accredited institutions.

The Cooperativa de Colombia controversy highlighted major issues with the regulation and oversight of private higher education institutions in Ecuador at the time. It led to reforms aimed at strengthening quality assurance and accreditation processes for universities operating in the country.
