= Ministry of Mines and Energy (Colombia) =

Government ministry of Colombia

- Ministerio de Minas y Energía

Ministry overview
- Formed: 10 April 1974
- Preceding Ministry: Ministry of Mines and Petroleum
- Headquarters: Calle 43 № 57-31; Bogotá, D.C., Colombia; 04°38′48.47″N 74°05′42.85″W
- Annual budget: COP$2,063,543,897,000 (2012); COP$2,656,258,850,000 (2013); COP$2,329,515,413,000 (2014)
- Ministry executive: Edwin Palma, Minister of Mines and Energy
- Child agencies: ANM; ANH; CREG; IPSE; SGC; UPME
- Website: www.minminas.gov.co

The Ministry of Mines and Energy (Spanish: Ministerio de Minas y Energía) is the national executive ministry of the Government of Colombia that oversees the regulation of the mining and mineral industry and the electricity sector in Colombia, it is similar in its duties to other energy ministries of other countries.

== List of ministers ==
Name	Assumed office	Left office	President(s) served under
Gerardo Silva	13 April 1974	7 August 1974	Misael Pastrana Borrero
Eduardo del Hierro	7 August 1974	10 July 1975	Alfonso López Michelsen
Juan José Turbay	10 July 1975	18 November 1975	Alfonso López Michelsen
Jaime García Parra	18 November 1975	27 January 1977	Alfonso López Michelsen
Miguel Urrutia Montoya	27 January 1977	3 October 1977	Alfonso López Michelsen
Eduardo Gaitán	3 October 1977	7 August 1978	Alfonso López Michelsen
Alberto Vásquez	7 August 1978	14 May 1980	Julio César Turbay
Humberto Ávila	14 May 1980	12 March 1981	Julio César Turbay
Carlos Rodado Noriega	12 March 1981	7 August 1982	Julio César Turbay
Carlos Martínez Simahan	7 August 1982	11 July 1984	Belisario Betancur
Álvaro Leyva	20 July 1984	17 June 1985	Belisario Betancur
Iván Duque Escobar	17 June 1985	7 August 1986	Belisario Betancur
Guillermo Perry Rubio	7 August 1986	19 August 1988	Virgilio Barco
Óscar Mejía Vallejo	19 August 1988	1989	Virgilio Barco
Margarita Mena	1989	7 August 1990	Virgilio Barco
Luis Fernando Vergara	7 August 1990	13 November 1991	César Gaviria
Juan Camilo Restrepo	13 November 1991	5 July 1992	César Gaviria
Guido Nule Amín	5 July 1992	7 August 1994	César Gaviria
Jorge Eduardo Cock	7 August 1994	1995	Ernesto Samper
Rodrigo Villamizar Alvargonzález	1995	1997	Ernesto Samper
Carlos Compte (acting)	1997	1997	Ernesto Samper
Orlando José Cabrales Martinez	1997	7 August 1998	Ernesto Samper
Luis Carlos Valenzuela	7 August 1998	2000	Andrés Pastrana
Carlos Eduardo Caballero	2000	2001	Andrés Pastrana
Luis Ramiro Valencia Cossio	2001	12 November 2001	Andrés Pastrana
Luisa Fernanda Lafaurie Rivera	12 November 2001	7 August 2002	Andrés Pastrana
Luis Ernesto Mejía Castro	7 August 2002	11 July 2006	Álvaro Uribe
Hernán Martínez	11 July 2006	7 August 2010	Álvaro Uribe
Carlos Rodado Noriega	7 August 2010	23 September 2011	Juan Manuel Santos
Mauricio Cárdenas	23 September 2011	3 September 2012	Juan Manuel Santos
Federico Rejinfo	3 September 2012	10 September 2013	Juan Manuel Santos
Almikar Acosta	10 September 2013	19 August 2014	Juan Manuel Santos
Tomás González Estrada	19 August 2014	9 March 2016	Juan Manuel Santos
María Lorena Gutiérrez (acting)	9 March 2016	20 April 2016	Juan Manuel Santos
Germán Arce	20 April 2016	7 August 2018	Juan Manuel Santos
María Fernanda Suárez	7 August 2018	25 June 2020	Iván Duque
Diego Mesa Puyo	25 June 2020	7 August 2022	Iván Duque
Irene Vélez	11 August 2022	19 July 2023	Gustavo Petro
Omar Andrés Camacho	4 August 2023	27 February 2025	Gustavo Petro
Edwin Palma	27 February 2025	Present	Gustavo Petro
