= Adela Chaljub de Char =

First Lady of the Atlántico from 1984 to 1987 (1943–1994)

First Lady of the Atlantico
- In role January 20, 1984 – March 2, 1987
- Governor: Fuad Char
- Preceded by: Maritza Gómez
- Succeeded by: Bertha Duncan

Personal details
- Born: Adela Chaljub Char; December 10, 1943 Lorica, Córdoba, Colombia
- Died: July 13, 1994 (aged 50) Jacksonville, Florida, U.S.
- Party: Liberal
- Spouse: Fuad Char (m. 1963)
- Children: Arturo; Alejandro; Antonio

Adela Chaljub de Char (née Chaljub Char; December 10, 1943 – July 13, 1994) was a Colombian philanthropist who served as First Lady of the Atlantico from 1984 to 1987 as the wife of Governor Fuad Char.

== Early life, marriage and family ==
Adela Chaljub Char was born on December 10, 1943, in Lorica, Córdoba, to Antonio Chaljub and Rosa Char de Chaljub (née Char Zaslawy). Her father was the son of Lebanese migrants from Byblos, while her mother was a Syrian migrant from Damascus. Her parents settled in Lorica, Córdoba, at the time the largest colony of migrants from Lebanon, Syria, and Palestine. On June 29, 1963, she married her first cousin Fuad, with whom she would have three sons:Arturo, Alejandro and Antonio.

Adela died on July 13, 1994, at the San Lucas Clinic in Jacksonville, Florida, United States, at the age of 50, due to a bone disease.
