= Miguel Peñaloza =

Colombian electrical engineer (born 1959)

11th Minister of Transport of Colombia
- In office 28 May 2012 – 3 September 2012
- President: Juan Manuel Santos Calderón
- Preceded by: Germán Cardona Gutiérrez
- Succeeded by: Cecilia Álvarez-Correa Glen

Personal details
- Born: Miguel Esteban Peñaloza Barrientos; 1959 (age 66–67) Cúcuta, North Santander, Colombia
- Party: Party of the U
- Education: Industrial University of Santander (BEE, 1980)
- Profession: Electrical Engineer

Miguel Esteban Peñaloza Barrientos (born 1959) is a Colombian electrical engineer, who briefly served in 2012 as the 11th Minister of Transport of Colombia. He has also served as High Presidential Adviser for the Regions and Citizen Participation in the administration of President Juan Manuel Santos Calderón between 2010 and 2012, and as High Presidential Adviser for Competitiveness and the Regions since 2008. during the administration of President Álvaro Uribe Vélez.

On 25 May 2012, President Santos designated Peñaloza to succeed Germán Cardona Gutiérrez as Minister of Transport of Colombia; he was sworn in on 28 May by President Santos in a ceremony at the Palace of Nariño.
