= Syrian Colombians =

Syrian Colombians Syria Colombia
سوريون كولومبيون (in Arabic) Sirios en Colombia (in Spanish)

Total population
- 700,000

Regions with significant populations
- Barranquilla · Cartagena · Maicao · Montería · Lorica · Santa Marta · Sincelejo.

Languages
- Colombian Spanish · Arabic · French

Religion
- Mostly Roman Catholic and Muslim

Related ethnic groups
- Lebanese Colombians, Other Arab Colombians

Syrian Colombians are Colombians of Syrian descent. Most of the ancestors of the Syrian community immigrated to Colombia from the Ottoman Empire in the late 19th and early 20th centuries for economic, political and religious reasons. The first Syrian moved to Colombia in the late nineteenth century. The largest wave of Syrian migration began around 1880. This had its highest peak from 1880–1910, with a decrease in the migratory flow after 1930. This wave of migration included Syrians, as well as Lebanese and the Palestinian immigrants. After that wave, Syrians continued their establishment in the north of Colombia, mainly in the Bolivar savannah, corresponding today to the departments of Córdoba and Sucre. Córdoba was the largest recipient of Syrian, Lebanese and Palestinian migration in the entire region, estimated to have been between 50,000 and 100,000, which makes the Syrians, only behind the Lebanese, the second largest group of immigrants in Colombia since independence. All together, 3.2 million people with Arab ancestry are estimated to live in Colombia, 700,000 are Lebanese.

== Notable people ==
- Fuad Char - Politician and businessman, founder of Olimpica Business Group (born 1937)
- Mercedes Barcha - Wife of Gabriel García Márquez (born 1932)
- Alejandro Char - Businessman and politician (born 1966)
- Arturo Char Chaljub - Politician
- Pablo Sabbag - Soccer player (born 1997)
- Soad Louis Lakah - Writer and poet (1952-2020)
- Julio Manzur - Politician and agricultural (born 1947)
- Wadith Manzur - Politician (born 1996)
- Edwin Besaile - Architect and politician (born 1980)
- David Barguil - Politician (born 1981)
- Fabio Amín - Economist and politician (born 1976)

== See also ==
- Arab diaspora
- Race and ethnicity in Colombia
- White Colombians
