= Sankofa Danzafro =

Colombian dance company

Sankofa Danzafro is a Colombian contemporary dance company. Founded in 1997 by Rafael Palacios, it has mainly produced and performed dances influenced by African, Latin-American and Afro-Colombian culture.

The company debuted La ciudad de los otros in 2010 to positive critical acclaim. The dance performance was influenced by hip-hop, capoeira and African-Colombian choreography and themed on social inequality. The company has also produced Behind the South: Dances for Manuel, a dance inspired by Manuel Zapata Olivella's novel about the African diaspora to Latin America Changó.

In 2022, it performed An Accommodating Lie. The company's first name is based on the Ghanaian concept of Sankova.
