= Presidency of Iván Duque =

Colombian presidencial administration from 2018 to 2022

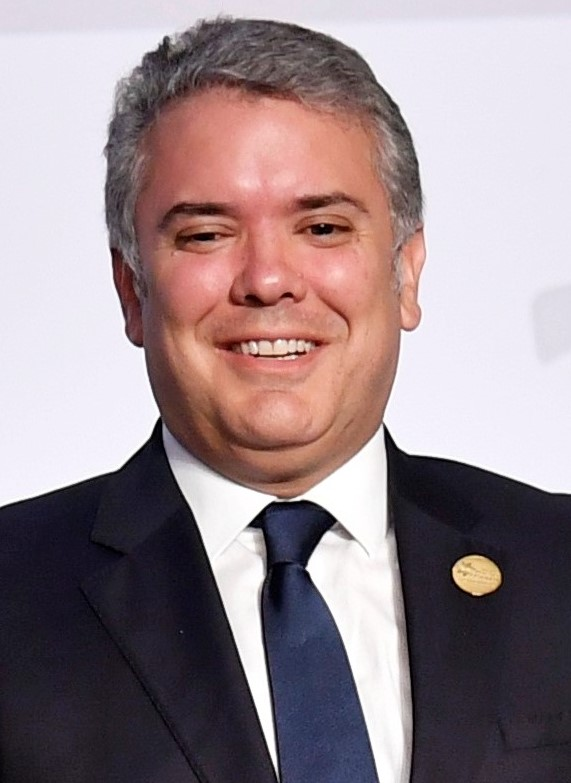
- Presidency of Iván Duque; 7 August 2018 – 7 August 2022
- Vice President: Marta Lucía Ramírez
- Cabinet: Full list
- Party: Democratic Center
- Election: 2018
- Seat: Casa de Nariño
- Seal of the President (since Sep 2018)

Iván Duque's tenure as the 33rd president of Colombia began with his inauguration on August 7, 2018, and ended on August 7, 2022. Duque, a centre-right or right-wing leader from Bogotá, D.C., took office after a victory over the leader of Humane Colombia Gustavo Petro in the 2018 presidential election. Duque was succeeded by Gustavo Petro, who won the 2022 presidential election.

== Domestic policy ==
=== Legislature ===
The beginning of the legislative agenda of the government of Iván Duque was characterized by various crises and clashes with the legislative and judicial branches. One of the first actions of his government was to object to the law that created the Special Jurisdiction for Peace as he had agreed in the Peace Agreements with the FARC-EP. Duque's objections were rejected when he received 110 negative votes in the House of Representatives and 40 votes against in the Senate, a decision that was ratified by the Constitutional Court. 7 Another of the great reforms that he tried to promote in the first place was the reform tax that sought to collect the vision of the "orange economy" proposed in the campaign. Said tax reform law was called the "financing law.".

The financing law promoted by the national government was declared unenforceable by the Constitutional Court, which led to the processing and approval of a new reform. In order not to affect the country's finances, the Court pronounced the effects of the Law until 1 January 2020. Likewise, the Constitutional Court is studying a claim of unconstitutionality against the current National Development Plan.

At the end of 2019, the Government of Duque managed to pass several laws, such as the new tax reform approved in the early hours of 20 December, or the 2013 Law that requires government officials to publish their declaration of assets and income, to register possible conflicts of interest and the declaration of income tax and complementary.

=== Electoral policy ===
==== Territorial elections ====
In October before the regional elections the presidential helicopter crashed which resulted in the death of 6 military personnel. During the 2019 territorial elections the government of President Duque lost the Governorship and the Mayoralty in the most important cities and saw a significant decrease in its voting going from 1‘489.240 votes to 1‘171.560 winning only the governorships of Casanare and Vaupés and having to govern in coalition in five other departments: Amazonas, Atlántico, Bolívar, Guaviare and Vichada; a fact that some political analysts attributed to the President's poor image. On 31 October 2019 the president met at a lunch with the entire Democratic Center caucus to analyze the results.

=== Infrastructure policy ===
==== Line Tunnel ====
After more than 100 years of planning and 11 years of construction delays, and after several corruption scandals surrounding its construction, Duque inaugurated the Túnel de la Línea, the longest tunnel in Latin America, and the most awaited and important work in the country.

=== Judicial policy ===
==== Espionage ====
During the government of Iván Duque a national controversy erupted around the counterintelligence activities of the National Army which allegedly intercepted communications, and profiled, more than 130 individuals, the majority journalists, but also opposition figures, and ordinary people according to their activity on the Internet.

The media described these events as a "new wave of illegal interceptions" that mainly affected politicians such as Roy Barreras and journalists from Semana, who were also victims of harassment and surveillance by intelligence units of the Army. According to Semana, these units received orders that came directly from the Central Command under General Nicacio Martínez, who resigned one day before the raids, on 27 December 2019.

Inside the installations strange events were reported, such as the presence of computer monitors turned on but without CPU and even a man dressed in civilian clothes hidden behind a filing cabinet in possession of a USB drive. They also noticed that on several computers the screws that held the hard drives were loose for which reason it is presumed that they were replaced before the raid. Likewise on seized cell phones evidence was found of the existence of WhatsApp groups that intelligence officers used to coordinate the destruction and concealment of the information.

Faced with the imminence of the revelation of the espionage operations of the National Army, the Central Command initiated a counterintelligence operation against Semana magazine and a purge within the Army, which ended the career of several officers.

Nevertheless, Iván Duque stated that the resignation of Nicacio Martínez had occurred for personal reasons, and that he had given the order to initiate an in-depth investigation to find the "bad apples" responsible for the case. He also promised to employ exemplary sanctions against the participants in the events, and put the generals of the Army Luis Fernando Navarro and Eduardo Zapateiro, as well as the Minister of Defense, Carlos Holmes Trujillo, in charge of the investigation.

In April 2020 President Iván Duque dismissed 11 officers and one general while another, Eduardo Quirós Chaparro, retired voluntarily. For its part the Casa de Nariño stated that these events were not done by order of the Government and that it had also been a victim of illegal surveillance by the army.

=== Media policy ===
According to the Chapultepec Index of the Inter American Press Association (IAPA), in 2020 Colombia was classified ninth in the American ranking of freedom of expression and press, as a country "under restriction" of freedom of the press. In 2021 the country descended to place #12 and in 2022 climbed to the tenth position.

=== Environment ===
In environmental matters, the Government issued a series of measures that would allow studying the possibility of applying hydraulic fracturing in the country; To this end, a commission of experts on the subject was formed, which determined the need to carry out pilot tests, in order to analyze the impact of this technique in context. All this, despite the fact that in a campaign event held in Bucaramanga, on 11 April 2018, Iván Duque had stated that: "here we have an overlapping of complex and diverse ecosystems, underground aquifers of enormous wealth and risks of greater seismicity due to the type of soil, which is why I have said that fracking will not be carried out in Colombia".

Notwithstanding the foregoing, the Council of State suspended the rules that regulate fracking Even so, the pilot tests to implement this technique in the country remained firm. Until April 2021, two of these pilots had been approved, which were assigned to the companies Ecopetrol and ExxonMobil.

In agricultural matters, a resolution of the Ministry of Agriculture at the end of 2019 that decreed the fishing quotas for the following year caused great controversy, since it was believed that it would allow finning, consisting of cutting the fins of sharks to market them. The Government clarified that these quotas have been established since at least 2010, and that finning is prohibited in the country; however, various analysts question the capacity of the State to enforce regulations on said practice.

=== Human rights ===
In terms of human rights, on 6 November 2019, a motion of censure was carried out in the Congress of the Republic against Defense Minister Guillermo Botero, the fifth motion of censure presented against a government minister in less than one year.

In this same context, the government was accused of having hidden the death of seven minors in Caquetá during a bombardment, who were later reported as guerrillas killed in combat. These accusations were again the subject of debate in Congress after a New York Times investigation reported on new guidelines from high command of the Armed Forces. that could allow the reappearance of the execution of civilians by the military.

The magazine Semana would report on a silence operation within the army orchestrated by the high command to identify and punish the military who had denounced human rights abuses. In an event in which the President was present in the city of Barranquilla, a journalist asked the president about the death of minors in a bombing in Caquetá, to which the president replied, without it being clear if he had managed to hear the journalist: "What are you talking about, old man?", opening controversy again in social networks. The journalist in question then reported having been beaten by the president's bodyguards.

== Institutional crisis ==
=== 2019 protests ===
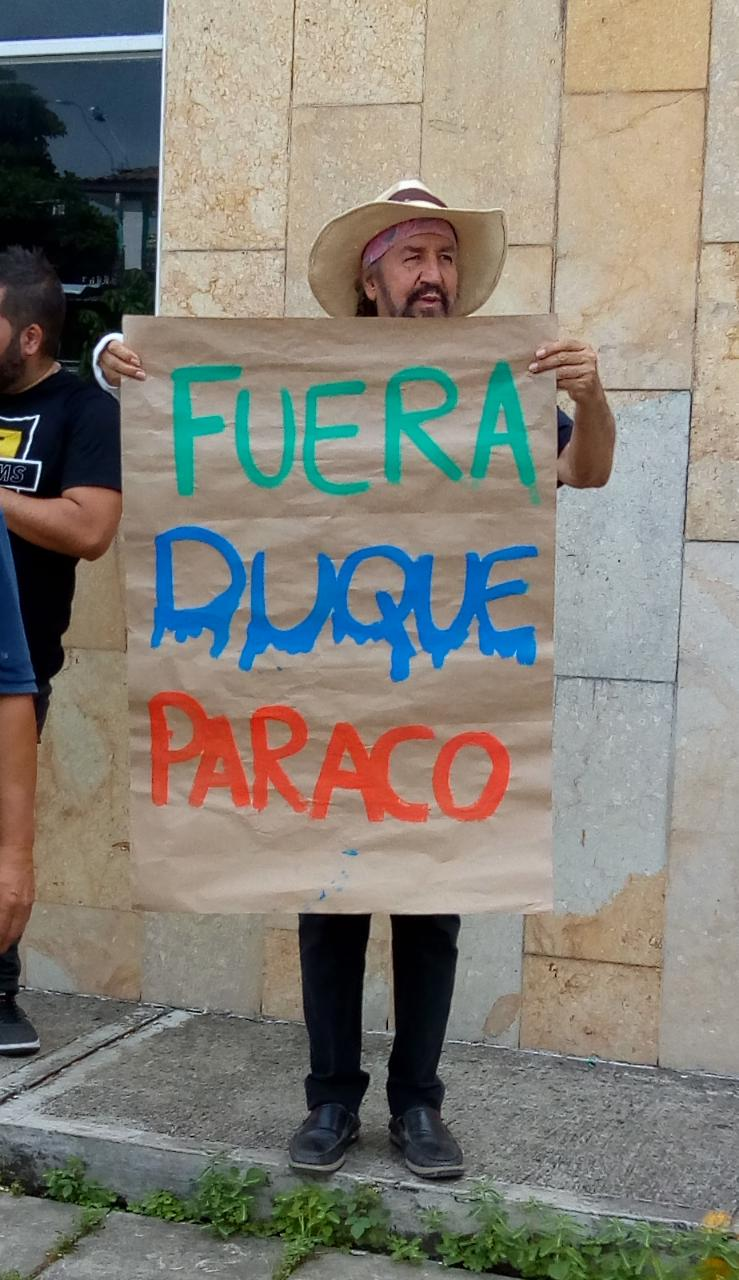
Banner in protest against the president of Colombia Iván Duque Márquez, during the 2019 Protests in Colombia.

As a result of all these scandals, Defense Minister Guillermo Botero resigned before his imminent expulsion from the cabinet that was coming with the vote of the motion of censure, generating an institutional crisis. It was in this atmosphere of political tension that the Government of Duque received a new blow, when on 5 October the Central Unitaria de Trabajadores de Colombia announced a national strike for 21 November.

The reason for the strike was expressed through a statement, in which, according to the union leaders, the Government looking for.

Additionally, the organizers of the strike called for the march to protest the creation of an international financial holding company, which according to the organizers of the strike would be issued "in order to privatize the public financial sector."

The government reacted to the announcement of the strike by increasing security measures, through the deployment of the National Army and National Police in the main cities, but expressing its support for the free exercise of constitutional right and for peaceful protest, without disturbances. Likewise, the Government denied that it was interested in making pension or labor reforms that went against the middle and popular classes of the country, and declared that the announcements about such intentions were false news.

On 21 November, the National Strike was held, which had a massive call throughout the country, [citation needed] seeing the commerce and traffic of some sectors in certain cities paralyzed. Cities like Bogotá or Medellín had military contingents arranged at strategic points to protect the transportation and service infrastructure. The day passed normally in the country, except in Bogotá and Cali, where there were serious disturbances. In Cali, the mayor decreed a curfew, and the city was taken over by the Army's Third Brigade, due to the report of alleged bands of looters, and the sound of shots and explosions.

Later, on 22 November, a curfew was decreed in Bogotá. Critics of the government accused these measures of putting the country under a state of siege. The curfew imposed in Bogotá was the first curfew decreed by a government since 1977. As a result of the national strike, the approval of the Duque government fell to 26%.

=== 2020 protests ===
After the Christmas and New Year holidays, meetings were held between the national government and the union, student and social organizations promoting the National Strike, without results, in a failed attempt at dialogue, riots began on the outskirts of the National University of Colombia on Avenida NQS in Bogotá, and the mayoress Claudia López sends the ESMAD to suppress the demonstrations. The National Strike Committee calls for a new cacerolazo and day of national strike. In the morning hours, in the main cities There were several blockades in the streets and thousands of people again expressed their discontent against the government of Iván Duque, there were some clashes with the ESMAD and the public force, in turn, abuses by the authorities were denounced on social networks. In Bogotá, Mayor Claudia López highlights the new protocol for the protests, declaring that “there were no deaths to lament.”

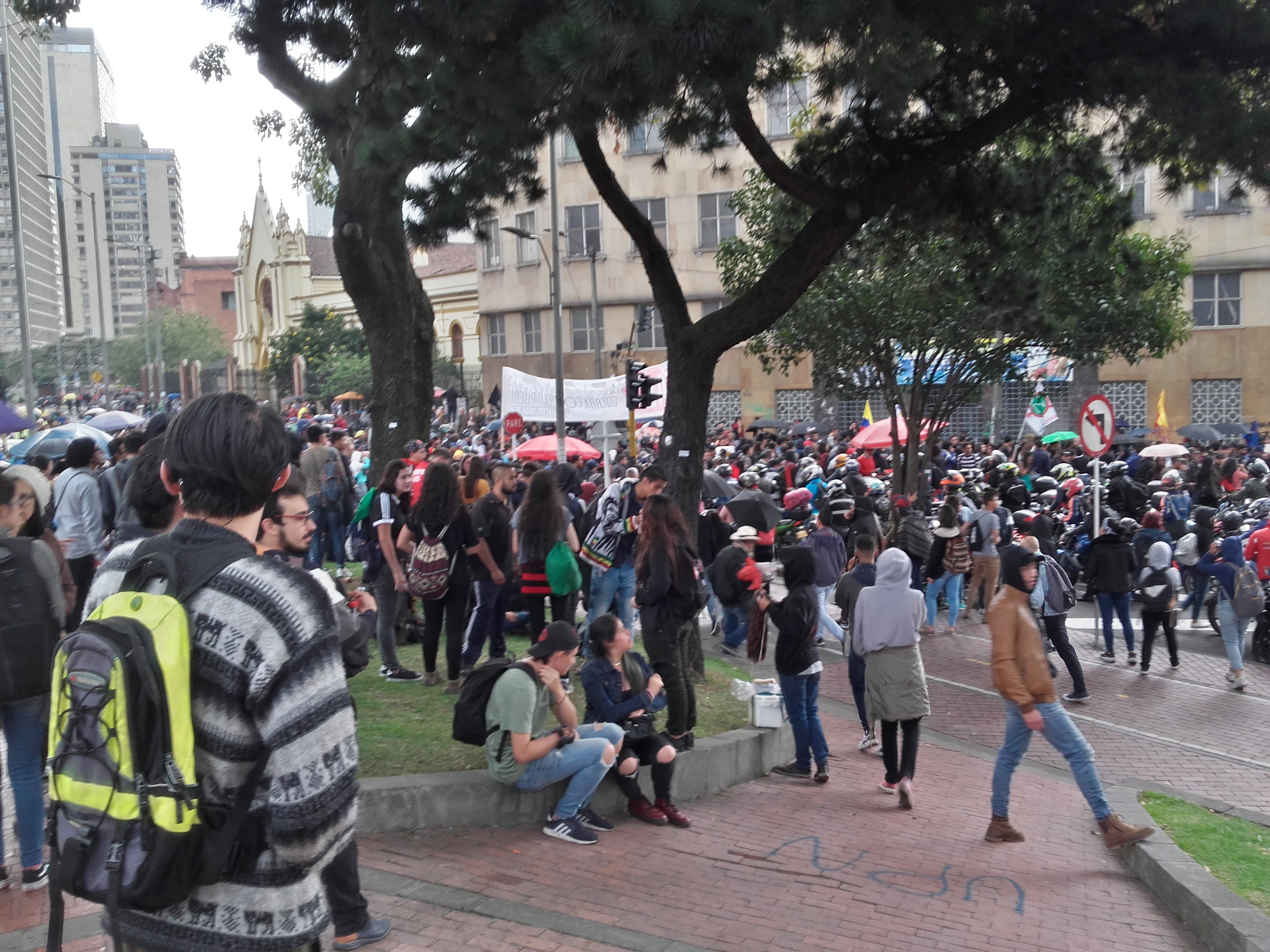
Protests in Bogota.

Later in February of that same year, marches of university teachers and students were held, most of them proceeded normally, except for a disturbance that occurred in the vicinity of the Francisco José de Caldas District University.

On September 9 and 10, in various sectors of Bogotá, there was an uprising against police violence following the murder of Javier Ordóñez. Demonstrations against police violence and for economic solutions during the pandemic took place the following days and the deaths of another 12 people were recorded.

On October 10, an indigenous minga traveled the route between Cauca and Bogotá, where it arrived on October 18. At the call of the union centrals, a National Strike was held on October 21 and a large demonstration was held in the capital of the Republic, with the participation of the Minga. The following day the Misak indigenous people occupied the Eldorado International Airport for 7 hours .

=== 2021 protests ===
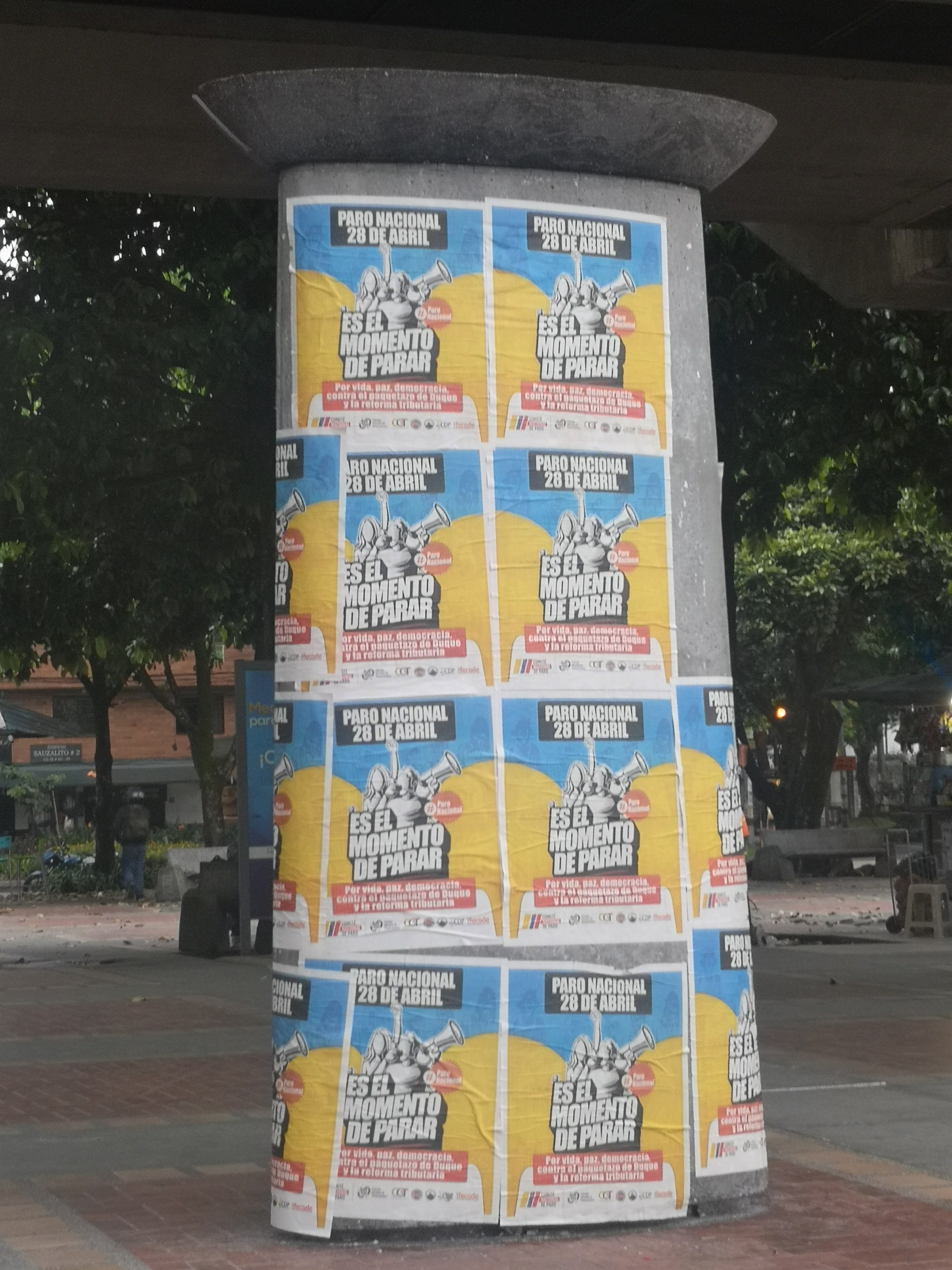
Promotional posters for the 2021 strike, Medellín.

The breaches by the Duque government of the agreements reached during the 2019-2020 protests in Colombia, added to the COVID-19 pandemic and the state's mismanagement of the pandemic, the 2021 Tax Reform, the Reform to Health of 2020, impunity in crimes against social leaders, and the lack of job and academic opportunities for the general population, as well as unfortunate and out of context comments by the Minister of Finance, Alberto Carrasquilla, led to new mobilizations at the end of the April 2021.

However, the government responded with repression to the demonstrations and curfews have been decreed in different sectors of the country. In addition, and given the escalation of violence, the government finally withdrew the Tax Reform project on 2 May 2021, and on Monday, 3 May, the Minister of Finance and his deputy minister announced their resignation.

The mismanagement of the protests has resulted in human rights violations, contempt of the authorities, abuse of the authorities, looting, burning and vandalizing buildings, shopping malls, military units; vandalization of monuments, the use of weapons prohibited by IHL, direct confrontations between protesters and public forces that leave an enormous balance of injuries and few deaths, among many other problems.

There have also been roadblocks, food shortages, and attacks on the Colombian press.

To date, large mobilizations continue to be registered throughout Colombia.

== Foreign policy ==
=== Venezuela ===
From his campaign, Duque affirmed in a meeting with the Vice President of the United States, Mike Pence, that in Venezuela "democracy must be restored" In the same way, on 5 July 2018, he traveled to the border with Venezuela, to meet with María Corina Machado, a Venezuelan opposition leader, in order to "strengthen ties" with the Venezuelan opposition. In August of that year, he described the government of Nicolás Maduro as a dictatorship, and affirms the need to holding free elections in that country, he also indicated that "if the" dictatorship "does not end, migration does not stop".

== Corruption Scandals ==
=== Centros Poblados Case ===
A corruption scandal that took place on August 10, 2021 during Iván Duque Márquez’s administration; also known as the "MinTic case" or "Abudinen scandal," it happened following journalist Paola Herrera´s complaint on W Radio. In it, Karen Abudinen, Minister of Information Technology and Communications (MinTIC), faced irregular handling of public procurement accusations.

In this political corruption case, the MinTIC Ministry awarded a one trillion colombian pesos worth contract to the contractor Unión Temporal Centros Poblados, which lacked both the necessary experience and technical capabilities and which also presented false bank guarantees. Karen Abudinen's ICT ministry gave them an advance of 70 billion colombian pesos ($17.5 million USD); the money was transferred to two companies, one in the state of Delaware, United States of America, and another in the city of Barranquilla, Colombia.

Despite available irregular handling of public procurement evidence, former President Iván Duque Márquez defended Karen Abudinenstating that she was an honorable woman. On September 9, 2021, due to media and congressional pressure, Karen Abudinen resigned from her position. However, she was cleared of all responsibility in this corruption case by the colombian Procuraduría General de la Nación, under Margarita Cabello Blanco´s direction. Most of the money hasn't been recovered.

Emilio Tapia Aldana, known for his involvement in Bogotá´s Carrusel de la Contratación scandal (Procurement Carousel), was convicted in this corruption case.

==== Antimalarial drugs purchase ====
On September 29, 2023, media reports made public that in March 2021, the Iván Duque administration directly purchased more than two million doses of antimalarial drugs, when Colombia's need for them was only 104,202 doses. As a result, former Health Minister Fernando Ruiz was reported to the colombian Attorney General's Office by Rodolfo Enrique Salas, legal director of the Ministry of Health under the Gustavo Petro administration. Former President Iván Duque defended former Health Minister Fernando Ruiz, stating that "...they are persecuting and accusing him of purchasing medication doses at times of high international price volatility."

Due to this drugs purchase, Colombia currently has enough antimalarial doses to last more than 300 years; however, the main problem is that the medications batches purchased expired in 2024.

Colombia's Secretary of Transparency, Andrés Idárraga, stated that former Health Minister Fernando Ruiz was aware of the medication doses purchase irregularities, and that due to his mismanagement more than $3.000.000.000 COP ($721,000 USD) of public funds were lost. The charges that former Minister Fernando Ruiz would face are embezzlement by appropriation, contract failure to comply with legal requirements, and malfeasance by omission in the purchase of the drugs artemether and lumefantrine.

===== Exclusive Public Medicines Business =====
On July 25, 2022, W Radio reported that the Iván Duque administration, through the National Public Procurement Agency - Colombia Buys Efficiently (Agencia Nacional de Contratación Pública - Colombia Compra Eficiente), awarded the medicines supply contract for public hospitals, the Police, and the National Army; this contract, called Framework Agreement for the Supply, Acquisition, and Dispensing of Medicines CCENEG-055-03-2022, was awarded to three private companies; the main beneficiary was Éticos Serrano Gómez Ltda., which, registered with the Chamber of Commerce, lists Farid Char & Cía S.C. in the city of Barranquilla, Colombia, as a partner. Éticos Serrano Gómez Ltda. also has as a partner the Char family close, businessman and Olímpica S.A.´s president, José Manuel Carbonell. The other two companies that signed the contract are Unión Temporal Audidrogas S.A. and Productos Hospitalarios S.A.

The medicines supply contract was awarded on July 21, 2022, just sixteen days before the presidency handover from Iván Duque to Gustavo Petro, and the process was worth 2.4 billion pesos ($588,000,000 USD).

Due to this contract's signing, Iván Duque's administration tied up for 3 years all medicines purchases that these public entities made (i.e. public hospitals, Police, National Army), to companies linked to Fuad Char´s family economic group (Grupo Empresarial Olímpica), and because of this Gustavo Petro´s administration was unable to purchase from suppliers different to those mentioned in the agreement.

Éticos Serrano Gómez Ltda. has been the contract's main beneficiary, with 27 purchase orders worth 1.8 billion pesos ($441,000,000 USD), of which $824,000,000,000 COP ($201,000,000 USD) were awarded by the General Directorate of Military Health (Dirección General de Sanidad Militar) in October 2023.

Over the last three years, investigations by the National Health Superintendency (Superintendencia Nacional de Salud) have revealed irregularities, such as the retention of 113,000 insulin units in an unauthorized warehouse belonging to Audifarma (an Audidrogas S.A. Temporary Union pharmaceutical manager), whereas there have been countless complaints from users not being able to find available insulin units at Audifarma´s drug dispensing locations. Another irregular case was reported by the colombian Comptroller General of the Republic (Contraloría General de la República), when conducting a National Police Health Directorate audit (Dirección de Sanidad de la Policía Nacional Disan), which detected an overcharge in more than 100 Police medications worth more than $68.000.000.000 COP ($16,500,000 USD). In response to these irregularities, on March 26, 2025, the Ministry of Health filed a criminal complaint against Audifarma for the alleged crime of medicines hoarding, as provided in Article 297 of Law 599 of 2000 or the Colombian Penal Code.

On April 10, 2025, it was reported that the National Public Procurement Agency - Colombia Buys Efficiently (Agencia Nacional de Contratación Pública - Colombia Compra Eficiente) requested the Superintendency of Industry and Commerce to investigate the possible existence of practices that impede competition in the medicines market, by the suppliers who won the aforementioned contract; additionally, it requested a precautionary measure to terminate the Framework Agreement with Éticos Serrano Gómez Ltda. and Unión Temporal Audidrogas S.A., and to allow other drug suppliers to participate.

On May 5, 2025, the National Public Procurement Agency - Colombia Buys Efficiently issued Resolution No. 244 of 2025, terminating the contractual relationship between the ANCP – CCE and both Éticos Serrano Gómez Ltda. and Unión Temporal Audidrogas S.A.
