= Karen Abudinen =

Colombian lawyer and politician

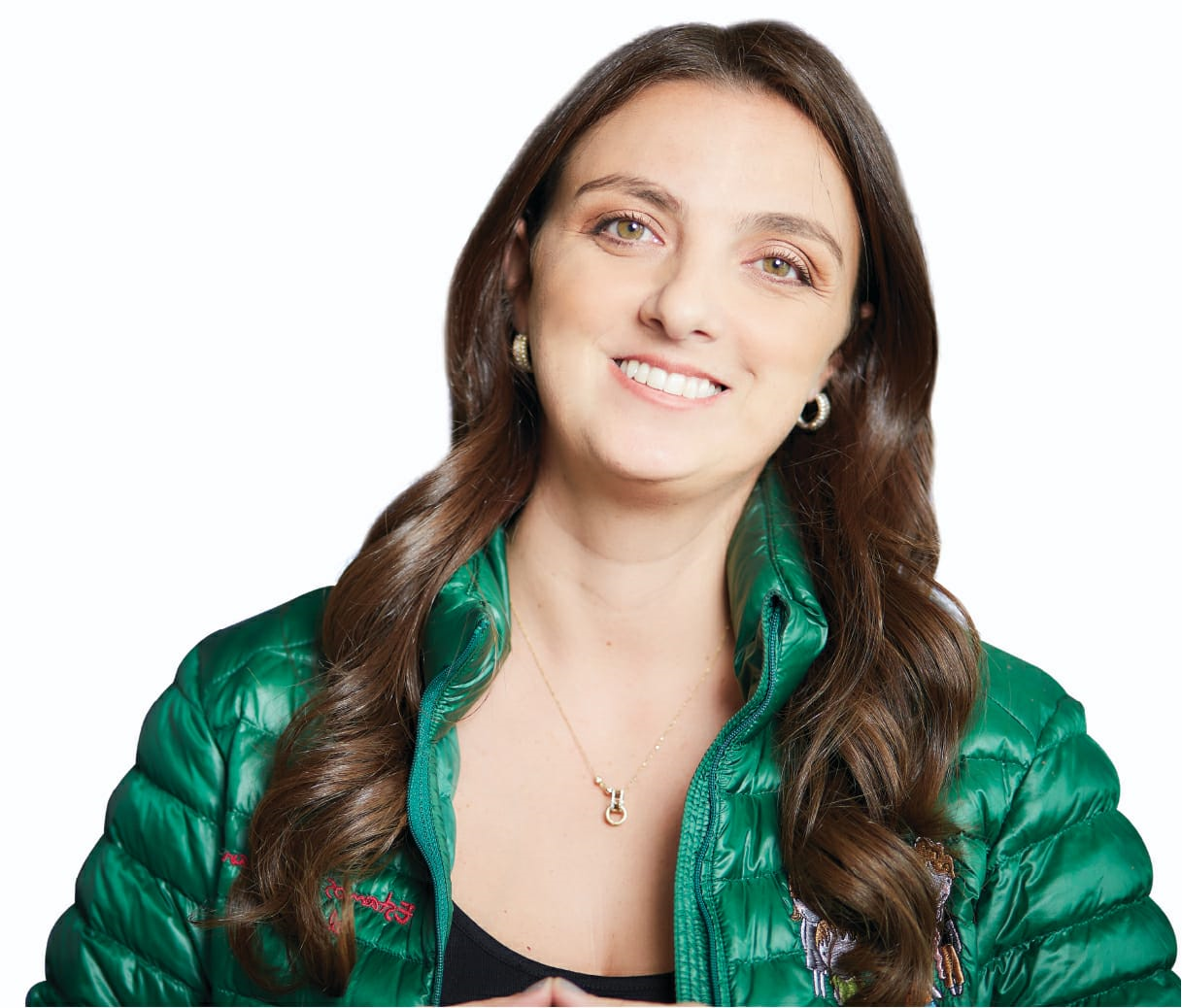

Minister of Information Technologies and Communications
- In office May 4, 2020 – September 9, 2021
- President: Iván Duque
- Preceded by: Sylvia Constaín
- Succeeded by: Carmen Ligia Valderrama

High Councilor for Political and Legislative Affairs
- In office November 1, 2019 – May 4, 2020
- President: Iván Duque
- Preceded by: Jaime Amín
- Succeeded by: Federico Hoyos

High Councilor for the Regions
- In office August 7, 2018 – May 4, 2020
- President: Iván Duque
- Preceded by: Juan Felipe Quintero
- Succeeded by: Federico Hoyos

General Director of the Colombian Institute of Family Welfare
- In office August 14, 2017 – July 15, 2018
- President: Juan Manuel Santos
- Preceded by: Cristina Plazas
- Succeeded by: Juliana Pungiluppi

Secretary of District Education of Barranquilla
- In office January 2, 2016 – August 8, 2017
- Mayor: Alejandro Char
- Preceded by: José Carlos Herrera
- Succeeded by: Bibiana Rincón

Secretary of Social Management of Barranquilla
- In office January 3, 2012 – September 5, 2014
- Mayor: Elsa Noguera
- Preceded by: Vicente Correa
- Succeeded by: Carlos José De Castro

Personal details
- Born: Karen Cecilia Abudinen Abuchaibe; September 29, 1976 (age 49) Barranquilla, Atlántico, Colombia
- Party: Radical Change (since 2014)
- Education: Universidad del Norte (BL); Georgetown University (LLM)

Karen Cecilia Abudinen Abuchaibe (born September 24, 1976) is a Colombian lawyer and politician. Abudinen from 2012 to 2014, served as Secretary of Social Management during the municipal administration of Elsa Noguera, then from 2016 to 2017 would serve as Secretary of District Education of Barranquilla. Later from 2017 to 2018 she would serve as Director General of the Colombian Institute of Family Welfare, she would subsequently serve as High Councilor for the Regions from 2018 to 2020 and simultaneously as High Councilor for Political and Legislative Affairs from 2019 to 2020, she would later be appointed Minister of Information and Communication Technologies from 2020 to 2021, a position she would later resign from after being involved in a corruption scandal involving her in the embezzlement of 70,000 million colombian pesos ($17.5 million USD) as well as irregular procurement.

== Notes ==
Political offices
Preceded by Sylvia Constaín	Minister of Information Technologies and Communications; 2020–2021	Succeeded by Carmen Ligia Valderrama
