= David Char Navas =

Colombian politician

Senator of Colombia
- In office 20 July 2006 – 28 October 2008

Member of the Chamber of Representatives of Colombia
- In office 20 July 2002 – 20 July 2006
- Constituency: Atlántico Department

Personal details
- Born: Barranquilla, Atlántico, Colombia
- Party: Radical Change
- Other political affiliations: Liberal
- Spouses: Albertina Guerra de la Espriella (divorced); Roxana Maria
- Relations: Fuad Char Abdala (uncle); Alejandro Char Chaljub (cousin); Arturo Char Chaljub (cousin)

David Char Navas is a Colombian politician who served as Member of the Chamber of Representatives of Colombia from 2002 to 2006 and as Senator of Colombia from 2006 to 2008. He was forced to resign to his seat in the Senate due to controversies surrounding two incidents for which he was being investigated, the first related to a city contract that his company Los Ángeles Ltd signed with the then Mayor of Barranquilla Bernardo Hoyos Montoya; the second came to surface after his name appeared in a seized computer of Jorge 40, a paramilitary leader of the United Self-Defense Forces of Colombia.

== Family ==
David comes from a well established and influential, Syrian-Arab-Colombian family, he is the son of Habib Char Abdala and Vivian Navas. He is the nephew of Fuad Char Abdala, and cousin of Arturo and Alejandro Char Chaljub, all politicians from the Atlántico Department. His family are the majority shareholders of the Junior Barranquilla, the city's foremost soccer team, and founders of Olimpica S.A., a chain of supermarkets in Colombia.
