= Hernán Martínez =

Colombian chemical engineer and politician (1942–2023)

Minister of Mines and Energy
- In office 11 July 2006 – 7 August 2010
- President: Álvaro Uribe
- Preceded by: Luis Ernesto Mejía Castro
- Succeeded by: Carlos Rodado Noriega

Personal details
- Born: Hernán Martínez Torres; 1 June 1942 Cartagena, Bolívar, Colombia
- Died: 28 December 2023 (aged 81)
- Education: Pontifical Bolivarian University

Hernán Martínez Torres (1 June 1942 – 28 December 2023) was a Colombian chemical engineer and politician. From July 2006 to August 2010, he served as Minister of Mines and Energy, under the administration of President Álvaro Uribe.

== Biography ==
Martínez studied chemical engineering at Pontifical Bolivarian University (UPB) and then specialized in oil management at Northwestern University. For 16 years, he served as President of Intercor, a subsidiary of ExxonMobil for the development of the Cerrejón Zona Norte coal mining complex. He also served as President of ExxonMobil Colombia, Corporate Planning Manager of Esso Colombiana and member of the board of directors of the Universidad del Norte, in Barranquilla. Before assuming the Ministry of Mines and Energy, Martínez was a member of the board of directors of several companies in both the public and private sectors.

Martínez represented the President of the Republic on the Board of the National Hydrocarbons Agency. He served as president of the Board of Directors of Cartón de Colombia. In addition, he belonged to the Boards of Directors of ISA, Traselca and Inversiones Suramericana.

== Death ==
Martínez died on 28 December 2023, at the age of 81.
