= Jaime Pumarejo =

Colombian politician

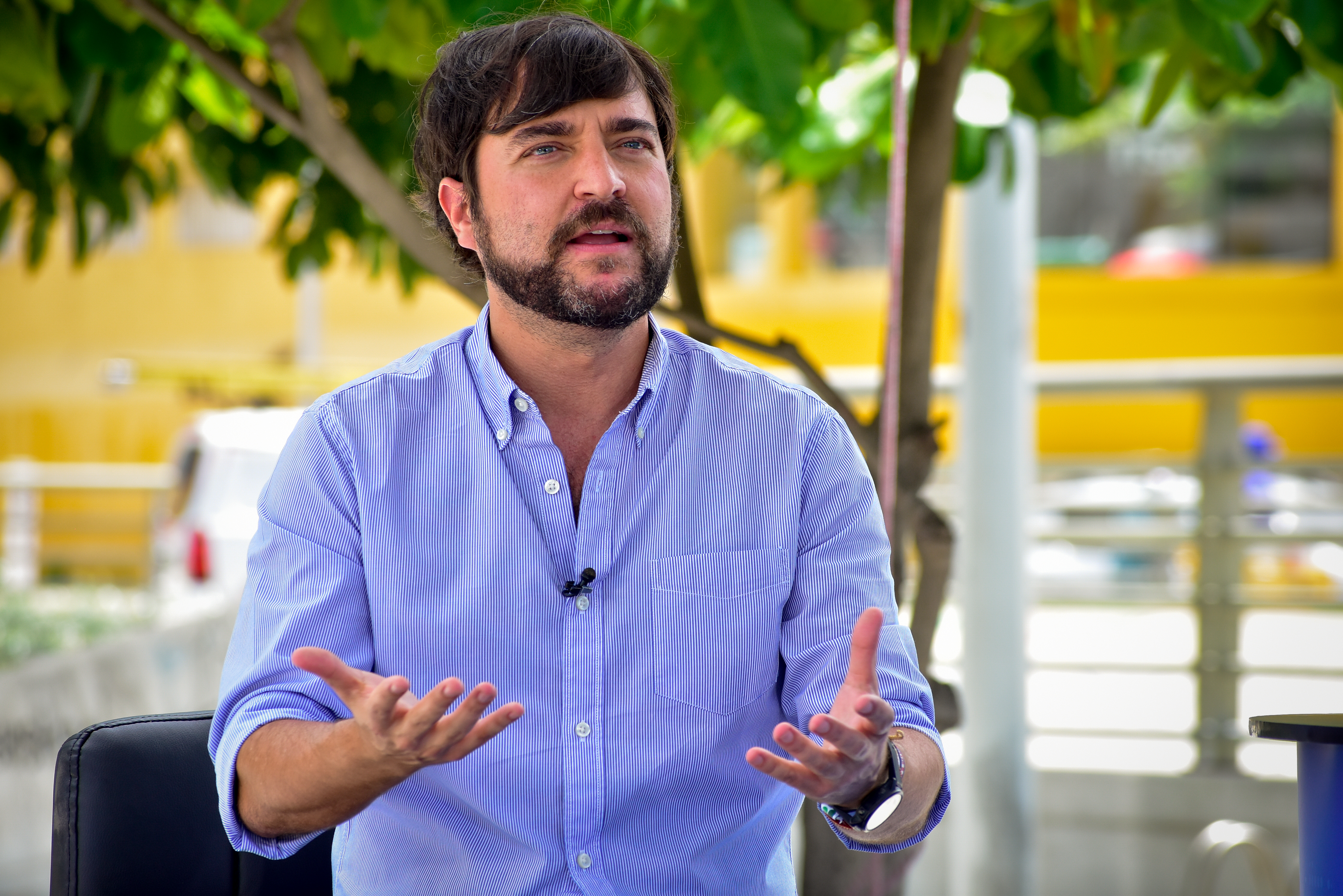
- Pumarejo in 2021

Mayor of Barranquilla
- In office January 1, 2020 – December 31, 2023
- Preceded by: Alejandro Char
- Succeeded by: Alejandro Char

Minister of Housing, City and Territory
- In office August 10, 2017 – October 12, 2017
- Preceded by: Elsa Noguera
- Succeeded by: Germán Cardona

President of ITSA University Institution
- In office January 1, 2020 – August 7, 2026
- Preceded by: Alejandro Char

Personal details
- Born: Jaime Alberto Pumarejo Heins; 21 November 1980 (age 45) Barranquilla, Atlántico, Colombia
- Party: Radical Change
- Education: Purdue University
- Profession: System administrator
- Website: www.jaimepumarejo.com

Jaime Alberto Pumarejo Heins (born November 21, 1980) is a Colombian information systems administrator and politician. From 2020 until 2023 he was the mayor of Barranquilla, the main economic center of the Caribbean region of Colombia and the fourth most populous city in the country.

== Early life ==
Born in Barranquilla on November 21, 1980, he is the son of Ingeborg Heins and Jaime Pumarejo Certain (deceased), businessman, councilor and first mayor of the city elected by popular vote in 1988 (although due to an error in the vote count he had to cede the mayorship to his cousin and competitor Gustavo Certain Duncan in 1989). He was married with Silvana Puello Visbal between 2013 and 2021.

=== Studies ===
Pumarejo has a bachelor's degree from the Karl C. Parrish School in Barranquilla (1999), Information Systems Administrator from Purdue University, Indiana, United States (2003) and a Master's in Business Administration with an emphasis in finance, from the IE Business School in Madrid, Spain.

== Political career ==
In 2006, at the age of 26, he was Secretary of Economic Development of the department of Atlántico. Two years later, as part of the group that promoted the transformations of Barranquilla between 2008 and 2019, he was appointed Counselor for Competitiveness of the District of Barranquilla (2008-2011), with the task of leading the process that put an end to onerous concessions and saved the District of Barranquilla more than 1 billion pesos; and Secretary of Mobility (2011-2012), in charge of projects such as the port corridor and the reduction of motorcycle taxis.

Between 2013 and 2015 he was manager of Puerta de Oro, a public-private alliance created to develop large events in Barranquilla, and from 2016 to 2017, City Manager, with the mission of structuring projects such as: Gran Malecón, Todos al Parque, the new planting plan for Barranquilla Siembra and the infrastructure for the Central American and Caribbean Games, among others.

On August 10, 2017, he took office as Minister of Housing of the government of President Juan Manuel Santos, and although he only spent two months in office due to the departure of his party from the government coalition, during this period "he committed to resolutely with the housing policy, which is one of the Government's most successful policies" and, among other achievements, "extended the maximum limit of the value of the home..." and "launched the schemes for taking advantage of solid waste dignifying the work of recyclers”.

== Mayor of Barranquilla (2020 - 2023) ==
On July 16, 2019, he registered his candidacy for Mayor of Barranquilla, representing the Radical Change Party. On July 22 of that year, he presented his government plan to the media, which proposed "to continue leading the transformation of the city through three fundamental axes: "an equitable, developed and connected city to improve the quality of life of the barranquilleros”, which would be renewed as it traveled through the neighborhoods and towns. On October 27, when 99.64% of the polling stations in the capital of Atlántico had been informed, it reached 308,221 votes, equivalent to 62.45% of the total, against 66,055 (13.88%) for the Democratic Pole candidate Antonio Bohórquez Collazos, who followed him in voting. He took office on January 1, 2020 on the Gran Malecón before 2,000 people, who heard his commitment to "turn Barranquilla into a biodivercity", work "so that higher education ceases to be a privilege and is a right", return "Puerto Mocho beach to the people of Barranquilla", recover the bodies of water and the historic center, among others.

=== Covid-19 ===
Three months after beginning his mandate, he issued the decree through which he adopted Decree 0457 of March 18, 2020 issued by the President of the Republic of Colombia and ordered "mandatory preventive isolation for all residents in the jurisdiction of the Special, Industrial and Port District of Barranquilla”, as a consequence of the health emergency due to the SARS-CoV-2 coronavirus. It was the beginning. On March 11, the WHO had declared Covid a pandemic. As in most countries and cities, Barranquilla had to change the public offer and put the leadership of its rulers to the test in order to face the health crisis that was threatening the lives of Barranquilla residents. In total there were four peaks.

In the midst of management, Barranquilla was the city that performed the most PCR tests (4,398 per 100,000 inhabitants); he doubled the number of Intensive Care Units he had installed in 30 years (from 410 to 906); led vaccination in Colombia and was declared by the government as a national model of economic reactivation.

Political offices
Preceded by Alejandro Char	Mayor of Barranquilla; January 1, 2020	Succeeded by
Preceded by Elsa Noguera	Minister of Housing, City and Territory; August 10, 2017–October 12, 2017	Succeeded by Germán Cardona
Preceded by Alejandro Char	President of ITSA University Institution; January 1, 2020-	Succeeded by
