= Elsa Noguera =

Colombian politician

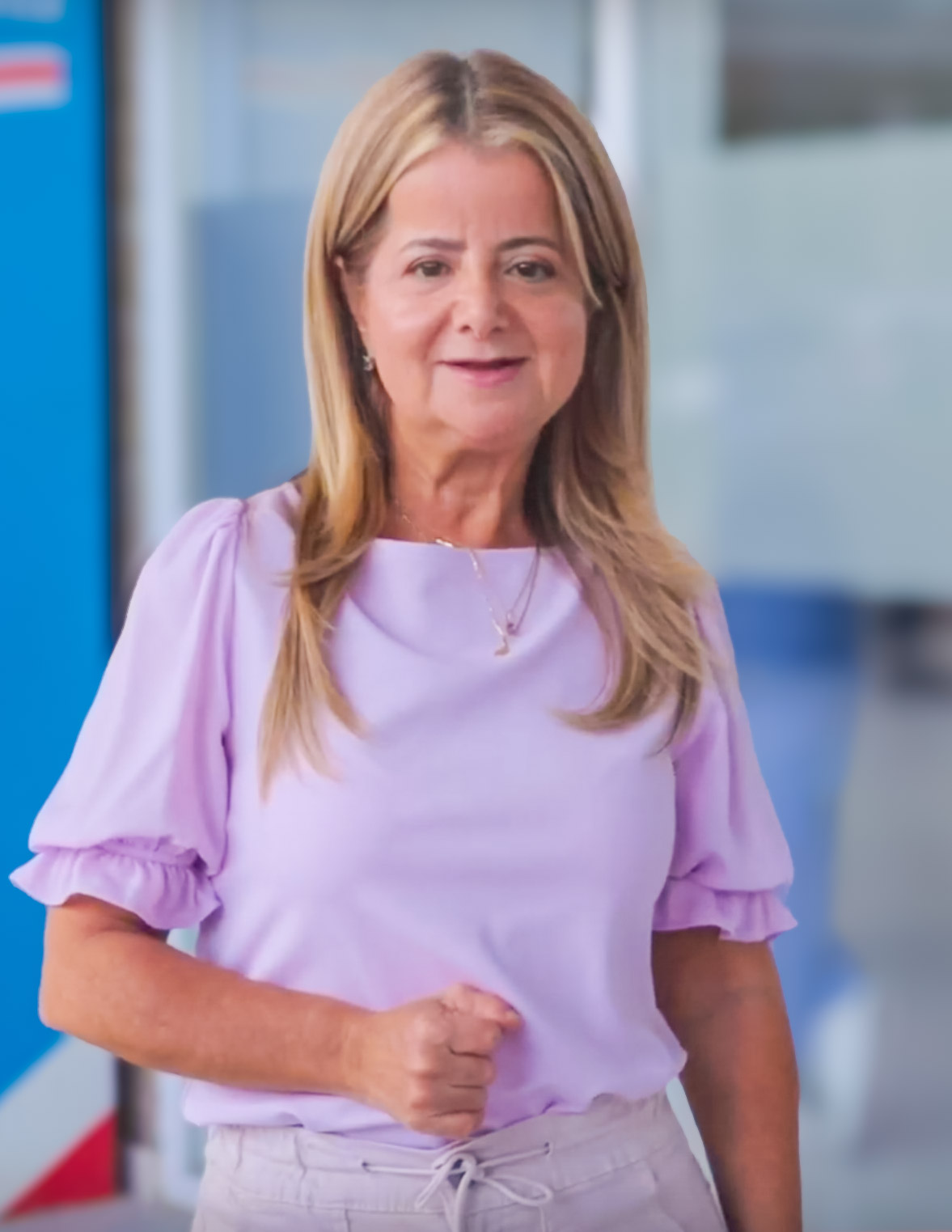
- Noguera in 2023

Minister of Transport
- Incumbent
- Assumed office 7 August 2026
- President: Abelardo de la Espriella
- Preceded by: María Fernanda Rojas

Governor of Atlántico
- In office 1 January 2020 – 1 January 2024
- Preceded by: Eduardo Verano de la Rosa
- Succeeded by: Eduardo Verano de la Rosa

Minister of Housing, City and Territory
- In office 25 April 2016 – 9 August 2017
- President: Juan Manuel Santos
- Preceded by: Luis Felipe Henao Cardona
- Succeeded by: Jaime Pumarejo

Mayor of Barranquilla
- In office 1 January 2012 – 1 January 2016
- Preceded by: Alejandro Char Chaljub
- Succeeded by: Alejandro Char Chaljub

Senior Presidential Advisor for Regions and Citizen Participation
- In office June 2010 – October 2011
- President: Álvaro Uribe Vélez

Secretary of Finance of Barranquilla
- In office 1 January 2008 – June 2010
- Mayor: Alejandro Char Chaljub

Personal details
- Born: Elsa Margarita Noguera de la Espriella; 30 September 1973 (age 53) Barranquilla, Atlántico, Colombia
- Party: Radical Change (since 2008)
- Other political affiliations: Liberal Party (1992–2001)
- Spouse: Juan Carlos Hernández (m. 2017)
- Education: Pontifical Xavierian University; American University
- Occupation: Economist • Politician

Elsa Margarita Noguera de la Espriella (born 30 September 1973) is a Colombian politician. She was the vice presidential nominee for the Radical Change Party in 2010, and in 2012 she was elected mayor of Barranquilla. She later served as the Minister of Housing, City and Territory. In 2020 she was elected the governor of the Atlántico Department.

Noguera received a degree in International Business from the American University. She also obtained an MBA from the University of the North (Uninorte).
