= Delia Zapata Olivella =

Colombian choreographer

- Born: Delia Zapata Olivella; April 1, 1926; Santa Cruz de Lorica, Córdoba, Colombia
- Died: May 24, 2001 (aged 75); Bogotá, Colombia
- Occupations: Dancer, choreographer, folklorist
- Children: Edelmira Massa Zapata (daughter)
- Parent: Antonio Zapata (father) Edelmira Olivella (mother)
- Relatives: Manuel Zapata Olivella (brother) Juan Francisco Zapata Olivella (brother)

Delia Zapata Olivella (Santa Cruz of Lorica, Córdoba, 1 April 1926 – Bogota, 24 May 2001) was a Colombian dancer, choreographer, and folklorist.

She was the sister of Manuel Zapata Olivella.

Zapata Olivella died on 24 May 2001 of complications from malaria after a tour in Africa
