= Eduardo Verano de la Rosa =

Colombian politician (born 1950)

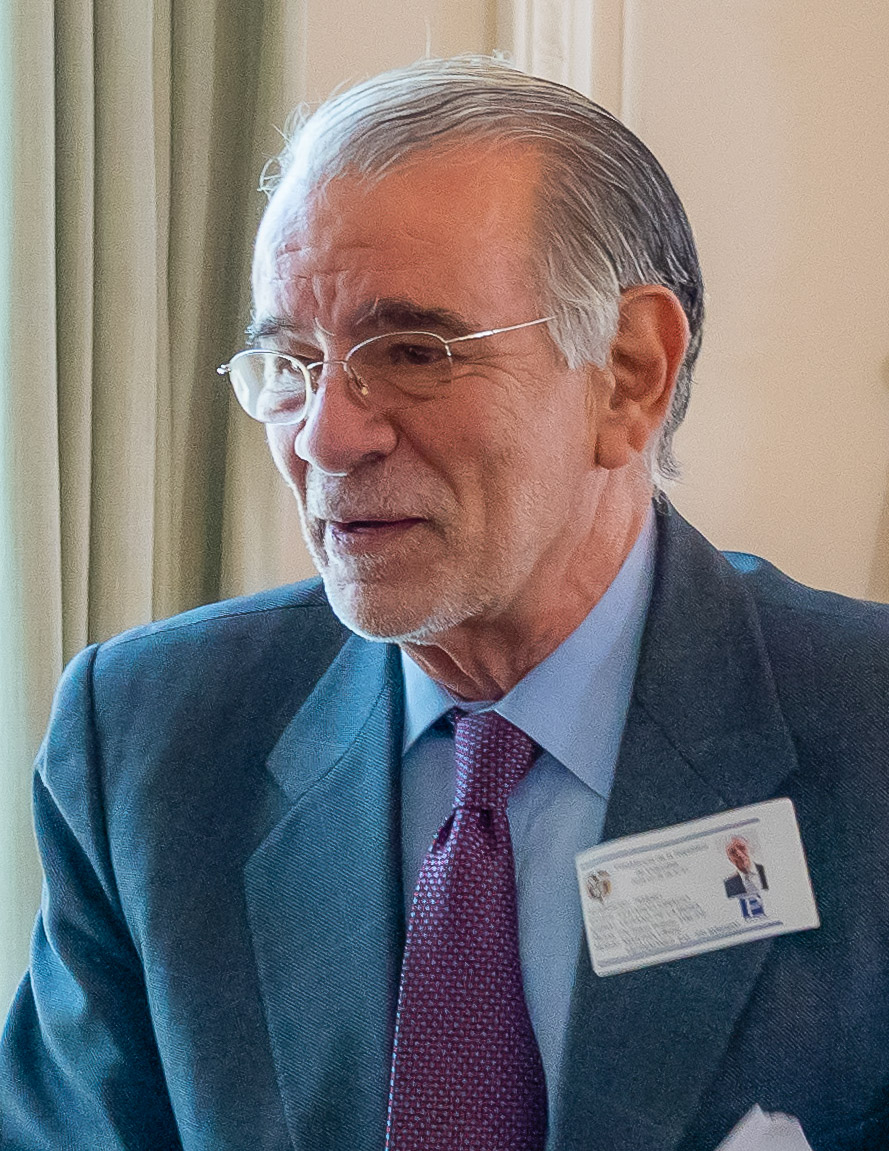

67th, 69th and 71st Governor of Atlántico
- Incumbent
- Assumed office 1 January 2024
- Preceded by: Elsa Noguera
- In office 1 January 2016 – 31 December 2019
- Preceded by: José Antonio Segebre
- Succeeded by: Elsa Noguera
- In office January 1, 2008 – December 31, 2011
- Preceded by: Carlos Rodado Noriega
- Succeeded by: José Antonio Segebre

Minister of Environment
- In office March 14, 1997 – August 7, 1998
- President: Ernesto Samper
- Preceded by: José Vicente Mogollón
- Succeeded by: Juan Mayr

Personal details
- Born: Eduardo Ignacio Verano de la Rosa; October 8, 1950 (age 75) Barranquilla, Colombia
- Party: Liberal
- Education: Universidad del Norte; Columbia University
- Occupation: Politician
- Profession: Businessman

Eduardo Ignacio Verano de la Rosa (born 8 October 1950) is a Colombian politician and businessman who is an active member of the Colombian Liberal Party. He served as Governor of Atlántico Department from 2008 to 2011 and from 2016 to 2019, and as Colombian Minister of Environment from 1997 to 1998.

== Early years and education ==
Verano studied Business Administration at the Universidad del Norte in Barranquilla, graduating in 1973. He continued graduate studies in this university, graduating as a Specialist in Urban Regional Development in 1975. He then moved to New York City in the United States, where he received an MBA from Columbia Business School in 1978.

== Private and political career ==
Upon his return from the United States, Verano started a career as a business administrator, combined with his militancy in the Colombian Liberal Party. Between 1978 and 1984 Verano was appointed manager of Cementos del Caribe, a Colombian cement company. In 1984, he was appointed general manager of the Empresa Municipal de Teléfonos de Barranquilla, the local state owned telephone company of Barranquilla. From 1986 until 1990 Verano was the appointed general manager of the Electrificadora del Atlántico, Barranquilla's state owned electricity company.

In December 1990, representing the Colombian Liberal Party under the support of Horacio Serpa, Verano ran for a seat in the Constituent Assembly of Colombia and was elected. The Constituent Assembly drafted and approved the Colombian Constitution of 1991.

During the mandate of President César Gaviria, Verano was appointed Director of the National Institute of Radio and television, INRAVISION (Instituto Nacional de Radio y Televisión) in 1992. Between 1992 and 1994, Verano served as general manager of the Corporación Eléctrica de la Costa, Corelca, the electric company that controlled the energy in most of the Caribbean Region of Colombia.

After the triumph of Liberal party candidate Ernesto Samper for the presidency of Colombia in 1994, Verano postulated himself for the Mayorship of Barranquilla but was defeated by Edgar George. President Samper then appointed him as Presidential Advisor to the Caribbean Region of Colombia until 1997 when he was then appointed as Minister of Environment in which he served until the end of the Pastrana administration.

=== Secretary General of the Colombian Liberal Party ===
In 1999, Verano was elected by the Liberal Party as Secretary General of the Colombian Liberal Party and later reelected in 2001. During his four years as Secretary General, Verano participated in the association of the party with the Socialist International, he also modernized and pushed forward the internal democratization of the party after the Liberal Constitution of 2000–2003 which concludes with internal elections. After these elections, Verano resigned.

In the internal elections of 2003 to select the candidate for the Governorship of Atlántico Department, Verano ended in second place behind Fernando Borda, who was supported by Senator José Name, despite this Borda was defeated in the general elections. After these elections, Verano dedicated himself to private businesses and affairs until 2005. In 2005 Horacio Serpa asked Verano to manage Serpa's third attempt to become president of Colombia, but in May 2006 Serpa ended up third in the presidential race.

=== Governor of Atlántico ===
Verano then decided to participate in the 2007 Colombian regional and municipal elections of 28 October by postulating his name for the Governorship of Atlántico Department. In the internal election of the Colombian Liberal Party Verano was the only candidate for what the president of the Liberal party, Cesar Gaviria decided to cancel the elections, but later Verano was reaffirmed. After this polls showed that Verano had a slight preference among the opinion and above the other possible candidate José Name. In some polls, both candidates were technically in a tie. Verano then received the support of other candidates Jaime Amín, Marieta Morad and Alfredo Palencia that allowed him to gain the support necessary to win. He was scheduled to assume office on January 1, 2008. In 2015 was reelected Governor of Atlantico Department from 2016 to 2019.
