= Manuel Zapata Olivella =

Colombian writer (1920-2004)

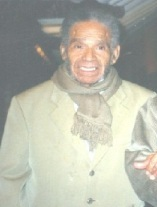
- Zapata Olivella at the Liga Latinoamericana de Artistas
- Born: 17 March 1920; Santa Cruz de Lorica, Colombia
- Died: 19 November 2004 (aged 84); Bogotá, Colombia
- Occupations: Doctor, anthropologist, writer
- Relatives: Delia Zapata Olivella (sister)
- Writing career
- Period: 1947–2004
- Notable works: Tierra mojada; En Chimá nace un santo; Changó, el Gran Putas 1983

Manuel Zapata Olivella (17 March 1920 – 19 November 2004) was a Colombian physician, anthropologist and writer.

== Biography ==
Zapata Olivella was born on 17 March 1920 in Santa Cruz de Lorica. When he was a boy, his father, the professor Antonio María Zapata Vásquez, moved with his family to Cartagena. Zapata Olivella's younger sister, Delia Zapata Olivella, was a Colombian dancer and folklorist.

He studied medicine at the National University of Colombia in Bogotá. In Mexico City, he worked in the Psychiatric Sanatorium of Dr. Ramírez and afterward in the Hospital Ortopédico of Alfonso Ortiz Thrown. He also worked for the magazine Time and for the magazine Events for All. He argued against his brother Virgil by defending the United States, but he later changed his mind after being racially discriminated against during a trip to the country.

During his stay in Mexico, he wrote the unpublished novel Arroz Amargo. He published several studies on the cultures of Afro-Colombians. He taught at several universities in the United States, Canada, Central America, and Africa. He founded and directed the literary magazine National Letters.

His father, a mulatto (of Spanish and African descent), and his mother, a mestiza (of Spanish and Indigenous Zenú descent), instilled a deep sense of pride in his own cultural roots, leading him to explore the narratives, histories, and cultures of the inhabitants of the Colombian Caribbean, especially the lives of Blacks and Natives. His most important work is the novel Changó (1983), an extensive work that is presented as an epic of the afroamericanos, narrating their origins in Africa. In a sense, Changó is a culmination of all of his previous writings.

His previous novel En Chimá Nace un Santo (1964) was a finalist in two contests, the Esso of 1963, in which it was defeated by Gabriel García Márquez with In Evil Hour, and the Prize of Brief Novel Seix Barral, in which first place went to The Time of the Hero by Mario Vargas Llosa.

== Works ==
=== Short stories ===
- 1948 – Pasión vagabunda
- 1952 – He visto la noche
- 1954 – China 6 am
- 1961 – Cuentos de muerte y libertad
- 1962 – El cirujano de la selva
- 1967 – ¿Quién dio el fusil a Oswald?
- 1990 – Fábulas de Tamalameque

=== Novels ===
- 1947 – Tierra mojada
- 1960 – La calle 10
- 1963 – Detrás del rostro
- 1963 – Chambacú, corral de negros, honorable mention at the Premio Casa de las Américas (1963)
- 1964 – En Chimá nace un santo
- 1983 – Changó, el Gran Putas 1983 – Historia de un Joven Negro
- 1986 – El fusilamiento del Diablo
- 1989 – Hemingway, el cazador de la Muerte

=== Essays ===
- 1997 – "La rebelión de los genes"

== Works in English ==
- Chambacu, Black Slum, translator Jonathan Tittler, Latin American Literary Review Press, 1989, ISBN 9780935480399
- Changó, the Biggest Badass, translator Jonathan Tittler, Texas Tech University Press, 2010, ISBN 9780896726734
- A Saint Is Born in Chima: A Novel. Translated by Thomas E. Kooreman. University of Texas Press. 1 May 2013. pp. 6–. ISBN 978-0-292-75363-1.

== See also ==
- Literature of Colombia
