= Soad Louis Lakah =

Colombian writer and poet (1952–2020)

Soad Louis Lakah الكثير من لويس لاكاه
- Born: Soad Louis Lakah; November 23, 1952; Cienaga de Oro, Córdoba Colombia
- Died: April 26, 2020 (aged 67); Montería, Córdoba, Colombia
- Education: National University of Colombia
- Writing career
- Language: Spanish

Soad Louis Lakah (November 23, 1952 - April 26, 2020) was a Colombian writer and poet, being the first from Córdoba who, during the 60s, dared to build a narrative and investigative work about the cultural ancestors of Sinú and its Syrian origins, in addition to being a cultural reference. manager who preserved those values.

Soad broke into the regional and national literary scene with her book 'Reasons of weight', some stories focused on popular stories from Ciénaga de Oro, her homeland, under the spell of Sinú.

== Early life ==
Soad Louis Lakah was born on November 23, 1952, in Cienaga de Oro, Córdoba, where he completed his high school studies. Later he would move to Bogotá to study literature at the National University of Colombia, his career was ruined by emphasizing the importance of the racial origins of Córdoba.

Her first challenge as a woman was daring to write in a department that had no tradition of women writers, and she blazed that trail in the face of harassment, stigma, and social prejudice.
