= Fuad Char =

Colombian politician (born 1937)

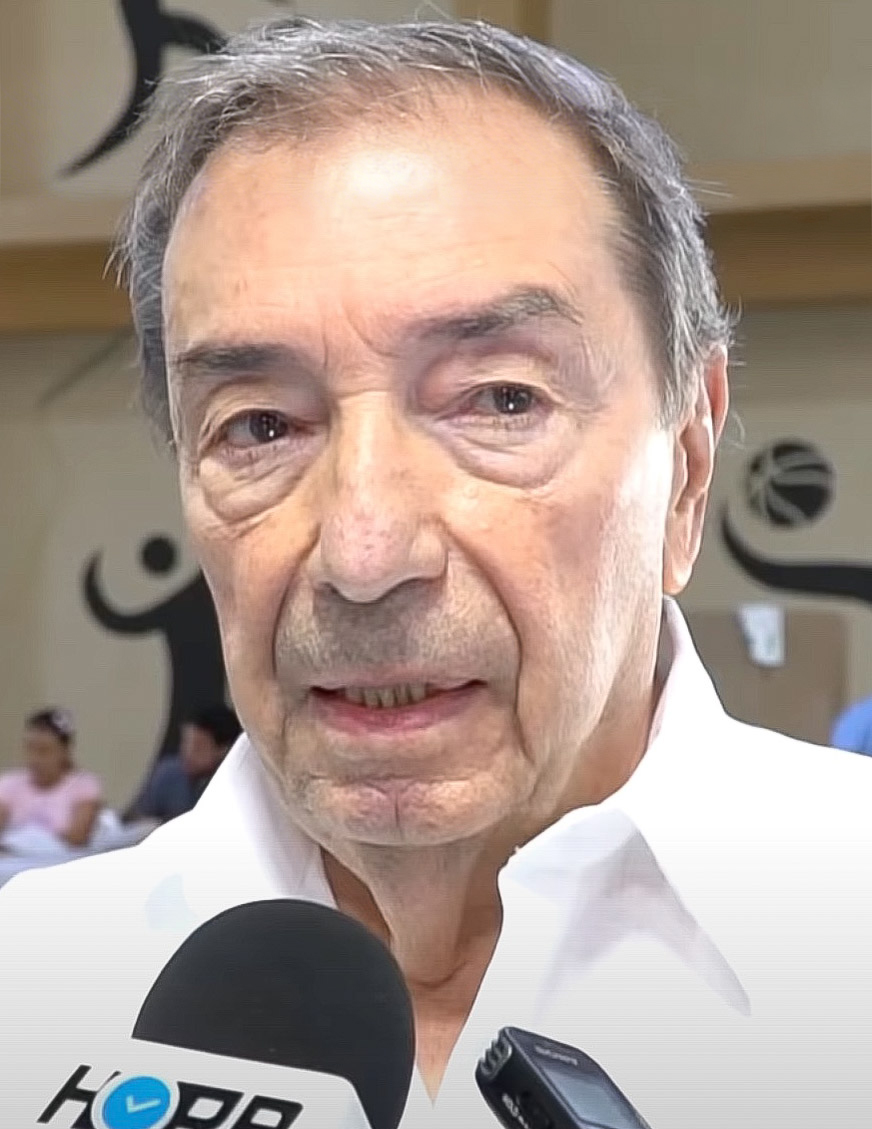

Senator of Colombia
- In office 20 July 2010 – 20 July 2014
- In office 20 July 1998 – 20 July 2006
- In office 20 July 1990 – 20 April 1995

Colombian Ambassador to Portugal
- In office 30 September 2008 – 5 June 2009
- President: Álvaro Uribe
- Preceded by: Plinio Apuleyo Mendoza
- Succeeded by: Arturo Sarabia

Minister of Economic Development
- In office 1987–1988
- President: Virgilio Barco
- Preceded by: Miguel Merino Gordillo
- Succeeded by: Carlos Arturo Marulanda

48th Governor of Atlántico
- In office 1984–1987
- Appointed by: Belisario Betancur
- Preceded by: Abel Francisco Carbonell
- Succeeded by: Gerardo Certain

Personal details
- Born: Fuad Ricardo Char Abdala; 5 October 1937 (age 89) Lorica, Córdoba, Colombia
- Party: Radical Change (2006-present)
- Other political affiliations: Liberal (1984-2006)
- Spouses: Adela Chaljub (m. 1963; died 1994); María Mercedes de la Espriella (m. 2004)
- Children: Arturo; Alejandro; Antonio

Fuad Ricardo Char Abdala (born 5 October 1937) is a Colombian businessman and politician who served as Governor of Atlántico from 1984 to 1987, as Minister of Economic Development from 1987 to 1988 under President Virgilio Barco, and later as Colombian Ambassador to Portugal from 2008 to 2009 under President Álvaro Uribe. Char also served as a Senator of Colombia three times, being one of the highest-ranking.

Born in Lorica, Córdoba, Char is one of the most powerful businessmen in Colombia and the entire Caribbean region of the country. He is the founder and current president of the Olimpica Business Group, one of the largest retail and business conglomerates in Colombia. He is also the owner of the professional football team Atlético Junior. Of Syrian origin, he is the patriarch of one of the most influential families in Colombia; his descendants have been known for their active work in politics. His eldest son, Alejandro, has been Mayor of Barranquilla three times, and his younger son, Arturo, was President of the Senate.

== Early life, marriage and family ==
Fuad Ricardo Char Abdala was born on 5 October 1937, in Lorica, Córdoba, to Syrian migrants Roberto Char and Erlinda Abdala de Char (née Abdala Chadjur). His father, was originally from Damascus, Syria, and had migrated to Colombia in late 1926, settling in Lorica, Córdoba, which was then home to the largest colony of migrants from Syria, Lebanon, and Palestine. Fuad has four auncles: Jabib, Farid, Simón, and Ricardo Jr.

In June 1963, he married his first cousin, Adela Chaljub, daughter of Antonio Chaljub of Lebanese origin and his aunt Rosa Char de Chaljub (née Char Zaslawy), with whom he had three sons, Alejandro, Arturo, and Antonio. Adela died in July 1994 at the age of 51 due to a bone disease.
