= Andrés Uriel Gallego =

Colombian politician (1950–2014)

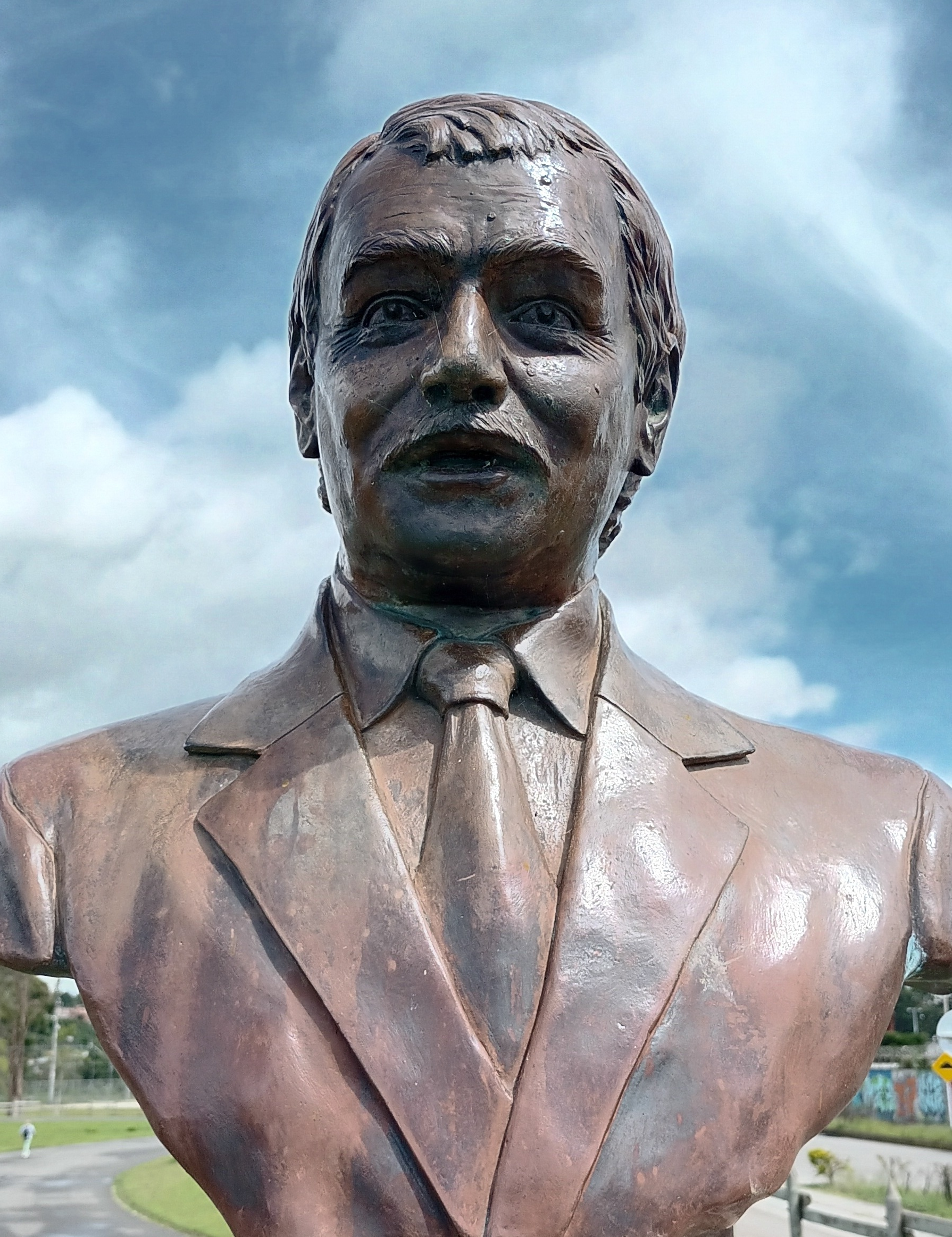
- Bust of Andrés Uriel Gallego

8th Minister of Transport of Colombia
- In office August 7, 2002 – August 7, 2010
- President: Álvaro Uribe
- Preceded by: Gustavo Canal Mora
- Succeeded by: Germán Cardona Gutiérrez

Personal details
- Born: April 1, 1950 Marinilla, Antioquia, Colombia
- Died: April 17, 2014 (aged 64) Medellín, Colombia
- Education: National University of Colombia
- Occupation: Civil engineer, politician

Andrés Uriel Gallego Henao (April 1, 1950 – April 17, 2014) was a Colombian civil engineer and politician. He served as the 8th Minister of Transport from 2002 to 2010 during the administration of President Álvaro Uribe.

Gallego died at the Hospital Pablo Tobón Uribe in Medellín, Colombia, at the age of 64. He was buried in the Campos de Paz cemetery.
