= Carlos Rodado Noriega =

Colombian engineer and politician

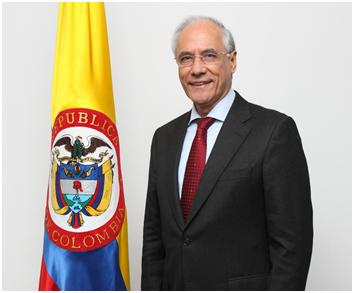
- Minister Rodado in 2010.

Colombia Ambassador to Argentina
- Incumbent
- Assumed office 11 April 2012
- President: Juan Manuel Santos Calderón
- Preceded by: Álvaro García Jiménez

28th Minister of Mines and Energy of Colombia
- In office 7 August 2010 – 26 August 2011
- President: Juan Manuel Santos Calderón
- Preceded by: Hernán Martínez Torres
- Succeeded by: Mauricio Cárdenas Santa María

Colombia Ambassador to Spain
- In office 21 May 2008 – March 2010
- President: Álvaro Uribe Vélez
- Preceded by: Noemí Sanín Posada
- Succeeded by: Orlando Sardi de Lima

58th Governor of Atlántico
- In office 1 January 2004 – 1 January 2008
- Preceded by: Alejandro Char Chaljub
- Succeeded by: Eduardo Verano De la Rosa

Member of the Chamber of Representatives of Colombia
- In office 20 July 1986 – 20 July 1990
- Constituency: Atlántico Department

9th Minister of Mines and Energy of Colombia
- In office 12 March 1981 – 7 August 1982
- President: Julio César Turbay Ayala
- Preceded by: Humberto Avila Mora
- Succeeded by: Carlos Martínez Simahan

Personal details
- Born: 20 September 1943 (age 83) Sabanalarga, Atlántico, Colombia
- Party: Conservative
- Spouse: Elizabeth Grijalba
- Education: National University of Colombia (B.Sc.); University of the Andes (M.Econ.); University of Michigan (Ph.D.)
- Profession: Civil Engineer, Economist

Carlos Enrique Rodado Noriega (born 20 September 1943) is a Colombian engineer and politician currently serving as Ambassador of Colombia to Argentina. He served as the 28th and 9th Minister of Mines and Energy of Colombia, first in the administration of President Julio César Turbay Ayala and again in the administration of President Juan Manuel Santos Calderón. Rodado, a civil engineer and economist, has also served as Ambassador of Colombia to Spain, President of Ecopetrol, Member of the Chamber of Representatives of Colombia, and as the 58th Governor of Atlántico.

On 20 September 2011, President Santos announced that Rodado would be stepping down as Minister of Mines and Energy to be replaced by Mauricio Cárdenas Santa María, and designated Rodado as new Ambassador of Colombia to Argentina. Rodado was sworn in by President Santos on 7 February 2012 at a ceremony at the Palace of Nariño, and presented his Letters of Credence to President Cristina Fernández on 11 April 2012 at an official ceremony at the Casa Rosada.
