= Arturo Char Chaljub =

Colombian politician

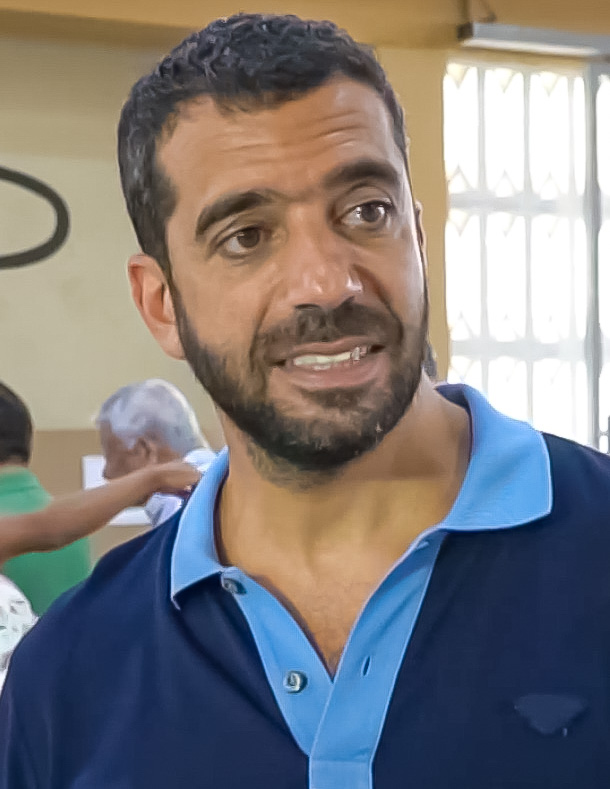
- Arturo Char in 2018

President of the Senate
- In office 7 August 2020 – 7 August 2021
- Preceded by: Lidio García Turbay
- Succeeded by: Juan Diego Gómez

Senator of Colombia
- Incumbent
- Assumed office 20 July 2014
- In office 20 July 2006 – 20 July 2010

Personal details
- Born: Arturo Char Chaljub; 5 November 1967 (age 58) Barranquilla, Atlántico, Colombia
- Party: Radical Change
- Spouse: Alessandra Warner Sánchez
- Relations: Alejandro Char Chaljub (brother)
- Children: Fuad Char Warner; John Char Warner; Adela Char Warner; Arturo Char Warner; Victoria Char Warner
- Parents: Fuad Char (father); Adela Chaljub (mother)
- Education: Kennesaw State University
- Profession: Business Administrator
- Website: www.arturochar.com

Arturo Char Chaljub (born 5 November 1967) is a former Senator of Colombia. Prior to his appointment he served as First Secretary of the Colombian Embassy in London.

== Family ==
Arturo comes from a well established and influential, Syrian-Arab-Colombian family, he is a son of Fuad Char, a Liberal Senator of Colombia and former Minister of Economic Development, and Ambassador of Colombia to Portugal, and his wife Adela Chaljub de Char. His brother, Alejandro Char, is the current mayor of Barranquilla, and his cousin, David Char Navas, is also a senator. Many of his relatives, are shareholders of the Junior Barranquilla, the city's foremost soccer team. He married Alessandra Warner Sánchez, whom he met while studying at Kennesaw State University in Georgia, United States. Together, they have five children, Fuad, John, Adela, Arturo and Victoria.

== See also ==
- José David Name
