= Germán Cardona =

Colombian politician (born 1956)

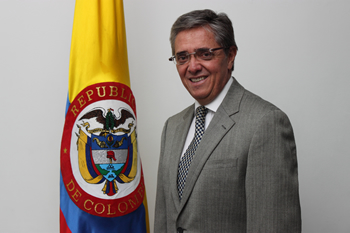

9th Minister of Transport of Colombia
- In office 7 August 2010 – 28 May 2012
- President: Juan Manuel Santos Calderón
- Preceded by: Andrés Uriel Gallego
- Succeeded by: Cecilia Álvarez-Correa Glen

Mayor of Manizales
- In office 1 January 2000 – 1 January 2003
- Preceded by: Jorge Enrique Rojas Quiceno
- Succeeded by: Néstor Eugenio Ramírez Cardona
- In office June 1992 – December 1994
- Preceded by: Victoria Eugenia Osorio
- Succeeded by: Mauricio Arias Arango

Governor of Caldas
- In office September 1989 – August 1990
- President: Virgilio Barco Vargas
- Preceded by: Victoria Eugenia Osorio

Personal details
- Born: Germán Cardona Gutiérrez; 28 December 1956 (age 69) Manizales, Caldas, Colombia
- Party: Party of the U
- Other political affiliations: Liberal
- Spouse: Angela María Acebedo (m. 1982)
- Children: 2
- Education: National University of Colombia (BEng, 1978)
- Profession: Civil Engineer

Germán Cardona Gutiérrez (born 28 December 1956) is a Colombian politician who served as the ninth Minister of Transport of Colombia in the Administration of President Juan Manuel Santos Calderón from 2010 to 2012. A civil engineer and businessman, he was twice elected Mayor of Manizales, once appointed Governor of the Department of Caldas and served as chairman of the Once Caldas in 2005.
