= Governor of Atlántico =

Head of government of the Department of Atlántico

Governor of the Department of Atlántico
- Arms of Atlántico

- Flag of Atlántico

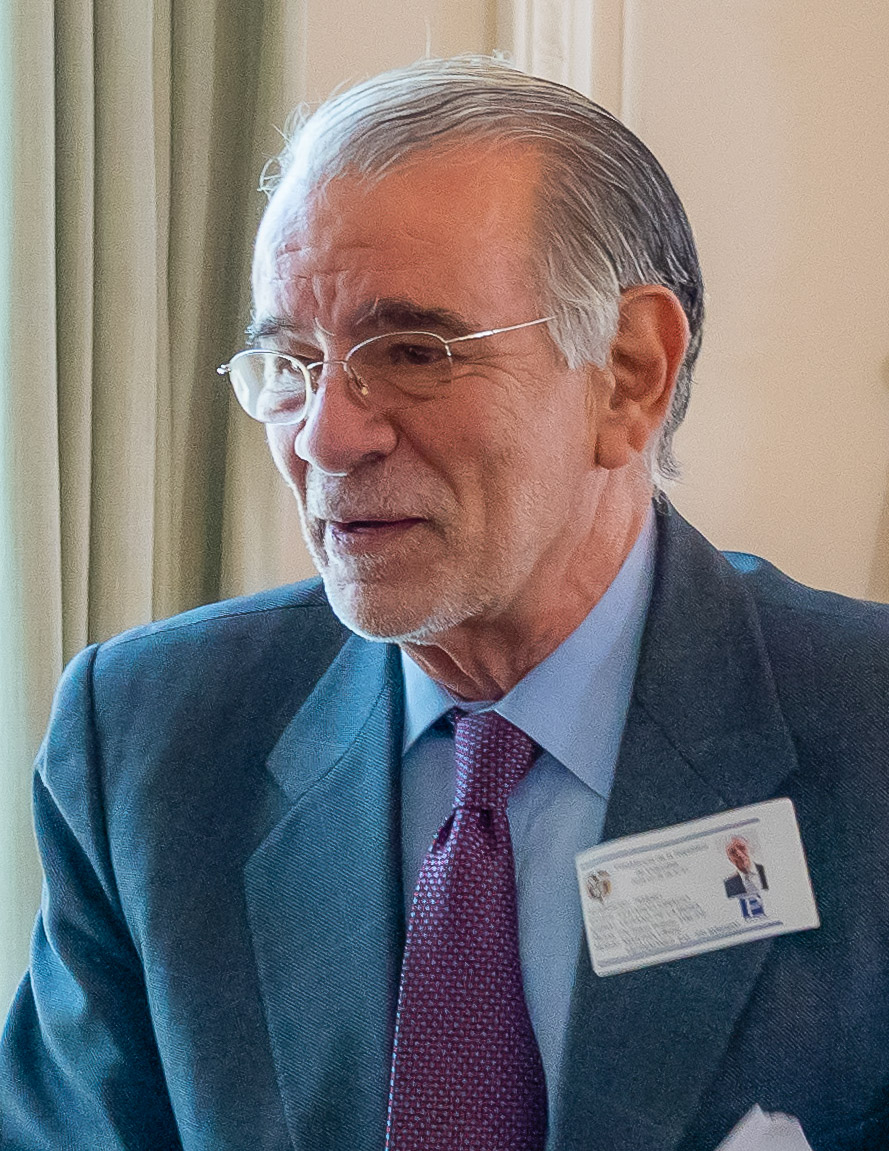
- Incumbent; Eduardo Verano de la Rosa since January 1, 2024
- Department of Atlántico
- Style: Governor (informal); The Honorable (formal)
- Type: Head of state Head of government
- Residence: None official
- Nominator: Political Parties
- Appointer: Popular vote
- Term length: Four years; limited to two consecutive terms
- Constituting instrument: Constitution of Colombia
- Formation: Departments of Colombia: June 1620; Current form: November 1910

The Governor of the Department of Atlantico heads the executive branch of the government of the Colombian Department of Atlántico. The governor is the highest-ranking official in the department and is elected by popular vote. The current governor is Eduardo Verano de la Rosa.

== Governors ==
Order	Name	Term
1	Diego A De Castro	1905 - 1906
2	Alberto Osorio	1906 - 1907
3	José Francisco Insignares	1907 - 1908
4	Daniel Carbonell	1909 - 1910
5	Anastacio Del Río	1910 - 1911
6	Rafael María Palacio	1913 - 1913
7	Pablo J. Bustillo	1913 - 1914
8	Teodosio Goenaga	1914 - 1915
9	Federico Castro Rodríguez	1918
10	Gabriel Martínez Aparicio	1919 - 1922
11	Eparquio González	1922 - 1928
12	José Ulises Osorio	1928 - 1930
13	Alberto Pumarejo	1930 - 1931
14	Juan B. Fernández	1931 - 1932
15	Juan Pablo Manotas	1932 - 1934
16	Nicolás Llinás Vega	1934 - 1935
17	José María Blanco Núñez	1935 - 1936
18	Rafael Blanco De La Rosa	1936 - 1938
19	Juan Antonio Donado	1938 - 1940
20	Joaquín Ramón Lafaurie	1940 - 1942
21	Alejo Solano Manotas	1948 - 1949
22	Rafael Gerlein Y Villate	1949
23	Alfredo Carbonell	1949 - 1950
24	T. Quintero De Fex	1950 - 1951
25	Eduardo Carbonell	1951 - 1952
26	Próspero Carbonell	1952 - 1953
27	Marco A. Villamizar	1953 - 1954
28	Jacinto E. Márquez	1954 - 1956
29	Julio E. Cesar Canal	1956 - 1957
30	Fernando J. Restrepo	1957
31	Néstor Madrid Malo	1957 - 1958
32	Alcides De La Espriella	1958 - 1959
33	Eduardo Martínez Gómez	1961 - 1962
34	José Victor Dugand R.	1962 - 1963
35	Francisco Posada De La Peña	1963 - 1965
36	Ernesto Mccausland	1965 - 1966
37	Eduardo Marino	1969 - 1970
38	Eduardo González Martínez	1970
39	Álvaro Dugand Donado	1970 - 1971
40	Antonio Abello Roca	1971 - 1973
41	José Tcherassi Guzmán	1973 - 1974
42	Roberto Gerlein Echeverría	1974 - 1975
43	Rafael Maldonado De Castro	1975 - 1976
44	Blanca Franco de Castro	1976 - 1978
45	Pedro Martín Leyes Hernandez	1978 - 1981
46	Roberto Pacini Solano	1981 - 1982
47	Abel Francisco Carbonell	1982 - 1984
48	Fuad Ricardo Char Abdala	1984 - 1987
49	Gerardo Certain	1987
50	Edgardo Sales Sales	1987 - 1990
51	Arturo Sarabia Better	1990 - 1991
52	Arnold Gómez Mendoza	1991
53	Gustavo Bell Lemus	1992 - 1994
54	Nelson Polo Hernández	1995 - 1997
55	Rodolfo Espinosa Meola	1998 - 2000
56	Ventura Díaz Mejía	2000 - 2003
57	Alejandro Char Chaljub	2003 - 2003
58	Carlos Rodado Noriega	2004 - 2007
59	Eduardo Verano De la Rosa	2008 - 2011
60	Jose Antonio Segebre Berardinelli	2012 - 2015
61	Eduardo Verano De la Rosa	2016 - 2019
62	Elsa Margarita Noguera de la Espriella	2020 - 2023
63	Eduardo Verano de la Rosa	2024 - 2027

== Sources ==
- "Gobernadores". Dpto del Atlántico (in Spanish). Secretaria de Planeación Departamental.
