= Alejandro Char Chaljub =

Colombian politician (born 1966)

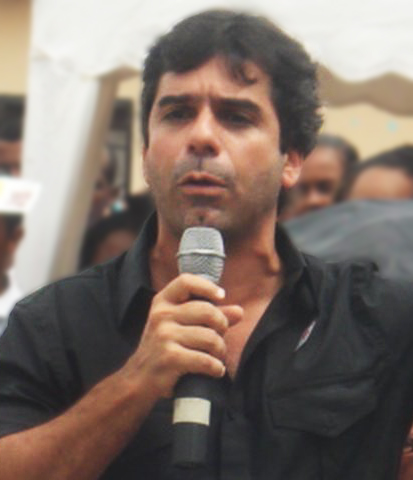
- Char on the political campaign

Mayor of Barranquilla
- Incumbent
- Assumed office 1 January 2024
- Preceded by: Jaime Pumarejo
- In office 1 January 2016 – 31 December 2019
- Preceded by: Elsa Noguera
- Succeeded by: Jaime Pumarejo
- In office 1 January 2008 – 31 December 2011
- Preceded by: Guillermo Hoenigsberg Bornacelly
- Succeeded by: Elsa Noguera

57th Governor of Atlántico
- In office 21 April 2003 – 1 January 2004
- Preceded by: Ventura Díaz Mejía
- Succeeded by: Carlos Rodado Noriega

Personal details
- Born: 16 April 1966 (age 60) Barranquilla, Atlántico, Colombia
- Party: Radical Change
- Spouse: Katia Nule Marino (m. 1999)
- Relations: Arturo Char (brother)
- Children: Alejandro Char Nule; Mariana Char Nule
- Parents: Fuad Char (father); Adela Chaljub (mother)
- Education: Universidad del Norte (BSc)
- Profession: Civil engineer
- Website: not available

Alejandro Char Chaljub (born 16 April 1966), commonly known as Alex Char, is a Colombian politician. He is Mayor of Barranquilla for the third time, having previously served two terms from 2008 to 2011 and 2016 to 2019. A civil engineer and member of the Radical Change Party, he was councilor for the Liberal Party in 1997 and in 2000 ran for the Governorship of the Department of Atlántico. Initial ballot results gave victory to his contender Ventura Díaz Mejía, but after a lengthy and often criticized process, the Administrative Supreme Court of Colombia reviewed the election results and found Char to be rightful winner of the race and allowed him to serve the remaining period of his term in 2003.

In 2007 he was elected Mayor or Barranquilla with 221,625 votes equivalent to 58.38% of the total vote, the biggest margin of votes in the Mayoral election history of Barranquilla, and according to an Invamer/Gallup poll, Char had a 75% approval rating in April 2008, the best ranked mayor of Colombia, a statistic that grew to an 80% approval rating at the end of 2008. In 2015 he was reelected for Mayor of Barranquilla defeating his opponent, ex councilor and independent politician Rafael Sanchez Anillo. In 2022, was pre-candidate for the Presidential Election in the representation of the independent movement País de Opportunidades, but he was beaten by Federico Gutiérrez in the primary elections celebrated on March 13, 2022. On October 29, 2023, was elected as Mayor of Barranquilla for third time defeating 5 opponents including the ex councilor of Barranquilla Antonio Eduardo Bohorquez Collazos.

== Family ==
Alejandro comes from a well-established and influential, Syrian Colombian family that immigrated from Damascus. he is the son of Fuad Char, a Liberal former Senator of Colombia, former Governor of the Department of Atlantico in 1984, former Minister of Economic Development in 1987, and Ambassador of Colombia to Portugal, and his wife was Adela Chaljub de Char, who died in 1994. His brother, Arturo Char was also a Senator of Colombia, as is his cousin David Char Navas. His other brother, Antonio Char was the president of Junior Barranquilla, the city's foremost football team. He married Katia Nule Marino on August 27, 1999, of Lebanese descent and a former winner of the Miss Carnival of Barranquilla pageant in 1995. She is the daughter of former Ministry of Mines and Energy and Minister of Communications Guido Alberto Nule Amín, and of Ginger Marino Mendoza, a lawyer and activist. Together they have two children, Alejandro Char Nule and Mariana Char Nule.

== Basketball ==
In 2018, the Titanes de Barranquilla became the city's first professional basketball team in 15 years. Char, who was Barranquilla's major at that time stressed that the team would enjoy his full support as it would support the development of the local youth. Char added that the idea of having the professional team in Barranquilla came from him. He said “we studied it, analyzed it, and gave the go-ahead, because after the Central American and Caribbean Games the city was hungry for sports. And furthermore, these venues need important events to keep them running and what better way than to be with a team like Titanes at the Elías Chegwin stadium.”

== Controversies ==
Alejandro Char has been linked with corruption cases, including the bribing of judges, and the purchase of votes for his personal benefit or the benefit of his political allies. The accusations were made by former congresswoman Aída Merlano Rebolledo, herself accused of participating in vote-buying patronage networks in the Caribbean Region (Colombia) and currently was returned from Venezuela.

Political offices
Preceded by Ventura Díaz Mejía	Governor of Atlántico; 2003–2004	Succeeded by Carlos Rodado Noriega
Preceded by Guillermo Hoenigsberg Bornacelly	Mayor of Barranquilla; 2008–2011	Succeeded by Elsa Noguera
Preceded by Elsa Noguera	Mayor of Barranquilla; 2016–2019	Succeeded by Jaime Pumarejo
