= Cecilia Álvarez-Correa Glen =

Colombian politician and industrial engineer

Cecilia Álvarez-Correa
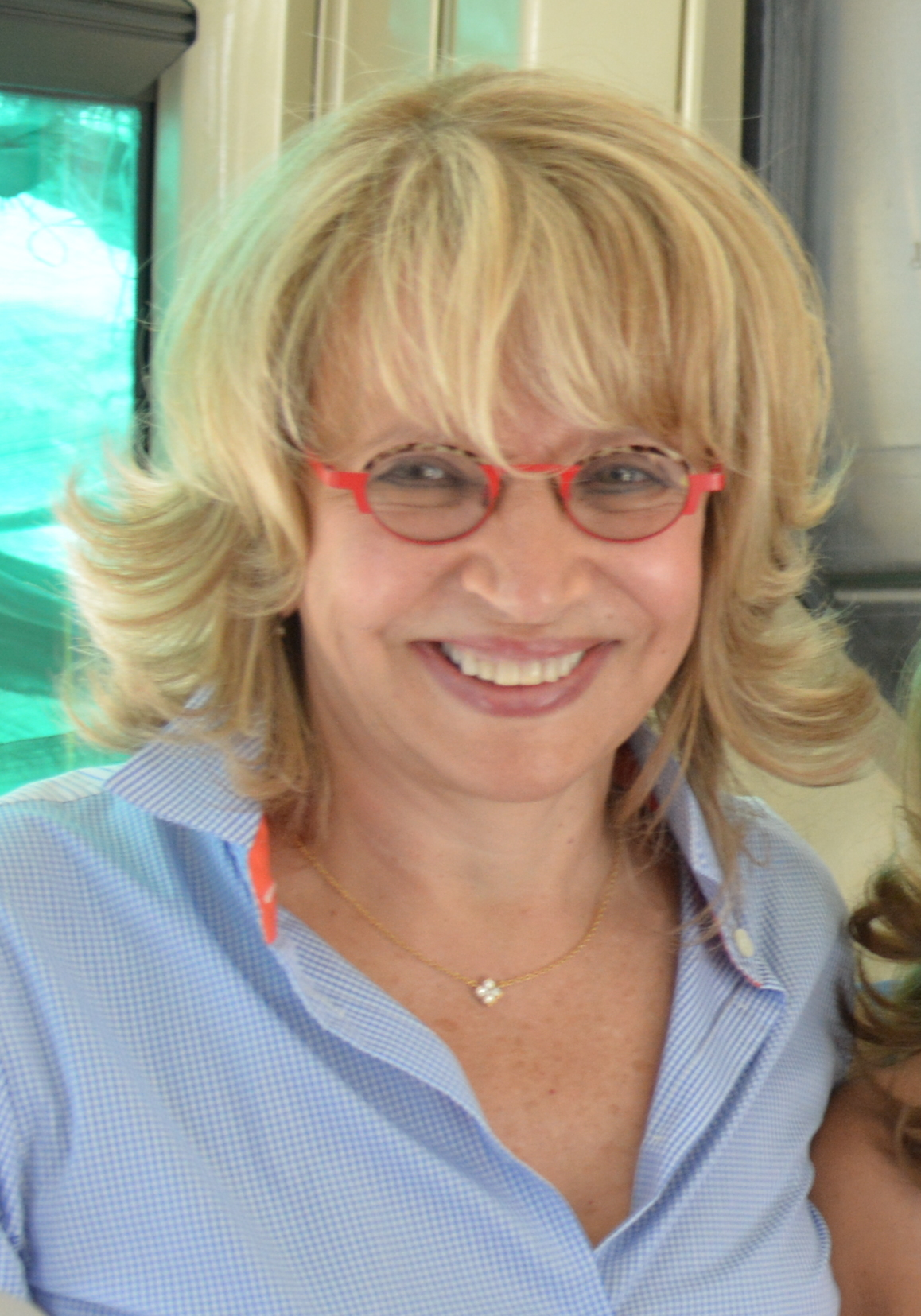
- Cecilia Álvarez-Correa Glen, 2014

Minister of Commerce, Industry and Tourism of Colombia
- In office 11 August 2014 – 7 August 2018
- President: Juan Manuel Santos
- Preceded by: Santiago Rojas
- Succeeded by: María Claudia Lacouture

Minister of Transport of Colombia
- In office September 3, 2012 – August 11, 2014
- President: Juan Manuel Santos
- Preceded by: Miguel Peñaloza
- Succeeded by: Natalia Abello

Personal details
- Born: Cecilia Álvarez-Correa Glen; 30 August 1953 (age 73) Ciénaga, Magdalena, Colombia
- Education: Pontifical Xavierian University (BsIE)

Cecilia Álvarez-Correa Glen (born 30 August 1953) is an Industrial Engineer and Colombian politician who served as Minister of Commerce, Industry and Tourism of Colombia under President Juan Manuel Santos Calderón. Álvarez-Correa is credited as the second woman to hold this post in Colombian history. Previously, Álvarez-Correa served as the 12th Minister of Transport of Colombia.

== Early and personal life ==
Correa was born in 1953 in Ciénaga, which is part of the Department of Magdalena in Colombia. She is the youngest of eight children to the Sephardic Jewish descent-family of Jaime Álvarez-Correa Díaz-Granados and María de Lourdes Glen Ruiz. She studied industrial engineering at the Universidad Javeriana, and afterwards obtained a specialization in private finance from the Universidad del Rosario.

She later held senior positions such as being the vice president of the Comptroller of Bavaria Brewery and was vice president of La Previsora S.A. She was also advisor to the High Ministry of the Presidency of the Republic and Economic Counselor of the High Council of Colombia. Prior to becoming minister of Transport she was the director of the Adaptation Fund, which is attached to the Ministry of Finance, and identified the needs for recovery and reconstruction after the 2010–2012 La Niña event.

She recently made public her personal relationship with the Minister of Education Gina Parody.

== Career ==
On 28 August 2012, President Juan Manuel Santos Calderón announced his decision to appoint Álvarez-Correa as Minister of Transport of Colombia. She was sworn in on 3 September at a ceremony at the Palace of Nariño. On August 11, 2014, Álvarez-Correa assumed the role of Minister of Commerce, Industry and Tourism of Colombia.
