= Universidad del Norte (Colombia) =

University in Barranquilla, Atlántico, Colombia

Coordinates: 11°01′05″N 74°51′04″W

- Type: Private
- Established: July 11, 1966
- Rector: Adolfo Meisel
- Faculty: 641
- Undergraduates: 13,082
- Postgraduates: 3,071
- Location: Km 5 Via a Pto Colombia, Barranquilla, Colombia
- Colors: Black, red and yellow
- Nicknames: Uninorte, la Norte
- Website: http://www.uninorte.edu.co

The University of the North (Spanish: Universidad del Norte), also known as Uninorte, is a private university in Barranquilla, Atlántico, Colombia. It was founded in 1966 by a business group led by American entrepreneur Karl C. Parrish. It started academic operation on July 11, 1966, with 58 students and 10 teachers in courses of business administration and engineering.

According to a recent ranking by Colombian consulting firm BOT SAS, Universidad del Norte is listed among the five best universities in the country.

The university has ten academic divisions, including Engineering, Administrative Sciences, Humanities and Social Sciences, Health Sciences, Legal Sciences, and Basic Sciences. It offers degrees in industrial, mechanical, systems, civil, electrical and electronic engineering. Other degrees include medicine, business administration, law, psychology, international relations, international business, Math, Industrial design, graphic design and architecture. In total, Uninorte offers 29 undergraduate programs, 62 professional specialization programs, 50 master's programs, and 15 doctoral programs. The university also offers some specialization programs in the nearby ports of Santa Marta and Cartagena.

All engineering programs are accredited by the ABET, which is one of the most important international accreditation agencies, located in Baltimore, Maryland, United States.

Uninorte is one of the most important cultural and technological centers in the Caribbean region of Colombia.

== History ==
On December 15, 1965, the provisional board of directors of the University of the Caribbean Foundation (Fundación Universidad del Caribe) was established. A month later, it was decided that it would be named Fundación Universidad del Norte (University of the North Foundation). However, the institution was officially established on January 24, 1966, with the signing of its founding charter by Karl C. Parrish Jr. and a group of businessmen from Barranquilla, belonging to the National Association of Industrialists (ANDI), the Colombian Institute of Administration (Incolda), and the Barranquilla Foundation, now known as the Mario Santo Domingo Foundation. The institution obtained its legal status through Resolution No. 149 of February 14, 1966, granted by the Governor of the Department of Atlántico.

The educational activities of Universidad del Norte began in the El Prado neighborhood (Carrera 53 No. 82-135) on July 11, 1966, with Julio Muvdi Abufhele (1966-1970), an engineer from Barranquilla, serving as its first rector. At that time, the University consisted of 58 students and ten professors teaching the basic courses in Business Administration and Engineering.

In 1970, the Colombian Institute for the Evaluation of Education (ICFES) approved the opening of the Psychology program, one of the first in Colombia.

During the presidency of Misael Pastrana (1970-1974), on November 20, 1971, the cornerstone was laid at the site where the University campus is currently located in the municipality of Puerto Colombia. At that time, the institution had 1,027 students, and the rector was the economist José Tcherassi Guzmán (1970-1973).

That same year, the Industrial Engineering and Mechanical Engineering programs were approved by ICFES. Following the donation of six hectares by Cementos del Caribe, now Argos, and the involvement of several other companies as donors, the university campus was inaugurated with the construction of the first three buildings on January 25, 1973.

Universidad del Norte received official recognition from the Presidency of the Republic of Colombia and the Ministry of National Education through Resolution 263 of February 22, 1973.

In December 1973, civil engineer Boris Rosanía Salive assumed the rectorship (1974-1980), and under his leadership, the La Playa project (later renamed the Atlantic Coast Project) was created. The Medicine and Nursing programs were launched. The University of the North Research Center (CIUN) was also established.

From 1980 to 2018, the philosopher and Doctor of Social Sciences, Jesús Ferro Bayona, served as rector. During his tenure, the University of the North began its modernization process, expanding its undergraduate programs and launching graduate programs at the master's and doctoral levels.

=== Principals ===
1. Julio Muvdi Abufhele (1966-1970)
2. José Tcherassi Guzmán (1970-1973)
3. Boris Rosanía Salive (1974-1980)
4. Jesús Ferro Bayona (1980-2018)
5. Adolfo Meisel Roca (2018-)

== Undergraduate programs ==
=== Undergraduate programs ===
School of Architecture, Urban planning and Design

- Undergraduate Programs in Architecture
- Undergraduate Programs in Graphic Design
- Undergraduate Programs in Industrial Design

Basic Sciences

- Undergraduate in Mathematics
- Undergraduate in Geology
- Undergraduate in Data Science

Health Sciences

- Undergraduate Program in Nursing
- Undergraduate Program in Medicine
- Undergraduate Program in Dentistry

Law, Political Science, and International Relations

- Undergraduate Degree in Political Science and Government
- Undergraduate Degree in Law
- Undergraduate Degree in International Relations

Institute of Educational Studies

- Bachelor's Degree in Early Childhood Education

Business School

- Undergraduate Programs in International Business
- Undergraduate Programs in Business Administration
- Undergraduate Programs in Public Accounting

Humanities, Arts, and Social Sciences

- Undergraduate Programs in Social Communication and Journalism
- Undergraduate Programs in Economics
- Undergraduate Programs in Philosophy and Humanities
- Undergraduate Programs in Psychology
- Undergraduate Programs in Music

Engineering Programs

- Undergraduate Degree in Civil Engineering
- Undergraduate Degree in Systems and Computer Engineering
- Undergraduate Degree in Electrical Engineering
- Undergraduate Degree in Electronic Engineering
- Undergraduate Degree in Industrial Engineering
- Undergraduate Degree in Mechanical Engineering
- Undergraduate Degree in Biomedical Engineering

Languages Program

- Undergraduate program in Modern Languages and Culture

== Organization ==
- María Cristina Martínez, Division of Basic Sciences.
- Silvana Insignares, Division of Law, Political Science, and International Relations.
- María del Pilar Garavito, Division of Health Sciences.
- Nancy Gómez Arrieta, Division of Humanities, Arts, and Social Sciences.
- Julián Arellana, Division of Engineering.
- María Clemencia Sierra, School of Business.
- Alexandra Bolaño, Office of Specializations.
- José Aparicio, Institute of Educational Studies.
- Mauricio Andrés García, School of Architecture, Urbanism, and Design.
- Lourdes Rey, Institute of Languages.

== Notable alumni ==
- Alejandro Char Chaljub, civil engineer, Mayor of Barranquilla.
- Eduardo Verano de la Rosa, business administration, Minister of the Environment, Governor of Atlántico.
- Natalia Cruz, communications specialist and journalist, television presenter on Univision.
- Jessica de la Peña, communications specialist and journalist, television presenter on Canal RCN.
- Daniella Álvarez, communications specialist and journalist, Miss Colombia 2012.
- Marcela Pérez, communications specialist and journalist, television presenter on Univision, winner of four Emmy Awards.
- Karen Abudinen, former Minister of Information and Communications Technologies.

== Gallery ==
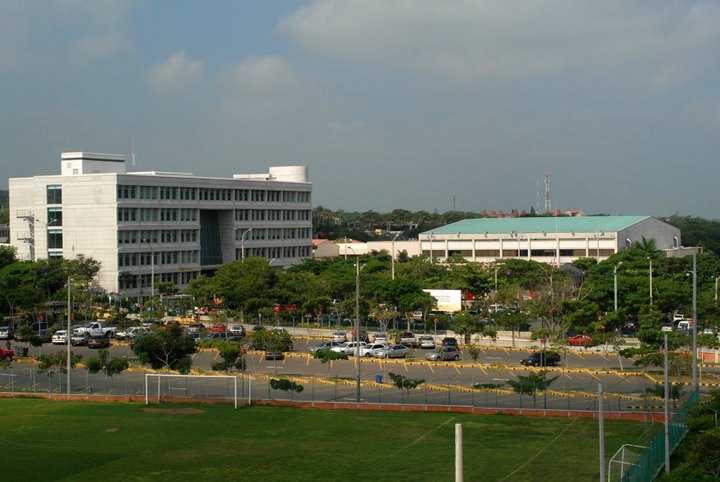
Graduate Building, rear view
