= Santa Cruz de Lorica =

Santa Cruz de Lorica Loriquero/a
- Municipality and town
- Flag Coat of arms

- Location of the municipality and town of Santa Cruz de Lorica in the Córdoba Department of Colombia.

- Location in Colombia
- Coordinates: 9°13′54″N 75°49′11″W
- Country: Colombia
- Department: Córdoba Department
- Founded: 1740

Government
  - Mayor: Francisco José Jattin Corrales

Area
  - Municipality and town: 951 km^{2} (367 sq mi)
  - Urban: 7.88 km^{2} (3.04 sq mi)
- Elevation: 7 m (23 ft)

Population (2020 est.)
  - Municipality and town: 115,461
  - Density: 121/km^{2} (314/sq mi)
  - Urban: 54,430
  - Urban density: 6,910/km^{2} (17,900/sq mi)
- Demonym: Loriquero
- Time zone: UTC-5 (Colombia Standard Time)
- Area code: 57 + 4
- Website: Official website (in Spanish)

Santa Cruz de Lorica is a town and municipality located in the Córdoba Department, northern Colombia.

Lorica was named a Pueblo Patrimonio (heritage town) of Colombia in 2010. It is the only municipality near the Caribbean coast that was selected to be part of the Red Turística de Pueblos Patrimonio original cohort.

As per 2020 estimates, the population of Santa Cruz de Lorica was 115,461, with a density ratio of 120 persons per square kilometer.

== Notable people ==
- Delia Zapata Olivella
- Leicy Santos

== Climate ==
Climate data for Lorica (Doctrina La), elevation 30 m (98 ft), (1981–2010)
Month	Jan	Feb	Mar	Apr	May	Jun	Jul	Aug	Sep	Oct	Nov	Dec	Year
Mean daily maximum °C (°F)	32.0 (89.6)	32.2 (90.0)	32.2 (90.0)	32.3 (90.1)	31.8 (89.2)	31.9 (89.4)	32.0 (89.6)	31.7 (89.1)	31.3 (88.3)	31.1 (88.0)	31.4 (88.5)	31.9 (89.4)	31.8 (89.2)
Daily mean °C (°F)	27.4 (81.3)	27.6 (81.7)	27.8 (82.0)	28.1 (82.6)	27.9 (82.2)	28.0 (82.4)	28.0 (82.4)	27.8 (82.0)	27.5 (81.5)	27.3 (81.1)	27.4 (81.3)	27.4 (81.3)	27.7 (81.9)
Mean daily minimum °C (°F)	23.7 (74.7)	23.9 (75.0)	24.6 (76.3)	25.0 (77.0)	24.8 (76.6)	24.6 (76.3)	24.3 (75.7)	24.2 (75.6)	24.2 (75.6)	24.2 (75.6)	24.2 (75.6)	24.0 (75.2)	24.3 (75.7)
Average precipitation mm (inches)	11.4 (0.45)	5.8 (0.23)	22.2 (0.87)	79.2 (3.12)	175.8 (6.92)	152.1 (5.99)	174.7 (6.88)	191.5 (7.54)	191.9 (7.56)	189.5 (7.46)	126.9 (5.00)	43.8 (1.72)	1,326.9 (52.24)
Average precipitation days	2	1	2	6	14	13	13	15	14	14	10	5	105
Average relative humidity (%)	83	82	82	82	85	85	84	85	85	86	85	84	84
Mean monthly sunshine hours	238.7	194.8	198.4	153.0	133.3	141.0	173.6	167.4	141.0	142.6	156.0	198.4	2,038.2
Mean daily sunshine hours	7.7	6.9	6.4	5.1	4.3	4.7	5.6	5.4	4.7	4.6	5.2	6.4	5.6
Source: Instituto de Hidrologia Meteorologia y Estudios Ambientales

Climate data for Lorica, elevation 30 m (98 ft), (1981–2010)
Month	Jan	Feb	Mar	Apr	May	Jun	Jul	Aug	Sep	Oct	Nov	Dec	Year
Mean daily maximum °C (°F)	33.4 (92.1)	33.8 (92.8)	33.9 (93.0)	33.6 (92.5)	32.5 (90.5)	32.6 (90.7)	32.7 (90.9)	32.6 (90.7)	31.9 (89.4)	31.4 (88.5)	31.7 (89.1)	32.4 (90.3)	32.7 (90.9)
Daily mean °C (°F)	27.3 (81.1)	27.5 (81.5)	27.8 (82.0)	28.0 (82.4)	27.7 (81.9)	27.6 (81.7)	27.6 (81.7)	27.5 (81.5)	27.2 (81.0)	27.0 (80.6)	27.1 (80.8)	27.3 (81.1)	27.5 (81.5)
Mean daily minimum °C (°F)	23.3 (73.9)	23.6 (74.5)	24.2 (75.6)	24.5 (76.1)	24.3 (75.7)	23.9 (75.0)	23.6 (74.5)	23.6 (74.5)	23.3 (73.9)	23.6 (74.5)	23.7 (74.7)	23.6 (74.5)	23.8 (74.8)
Average precipitation mm (inches)	11.5 (0.45)	13.4 (0.53)	24.3 (0.96)	93.9 (3.70)	151.8 (5.98)	145.4 (5.72)	144.7 (5.70)	173.5 (6.83)	177.6 (6.99)	152.0 (5.98)	126.6 (4.98)	38.7 (1.52)	1,253.3 (49.34)
Average precipitation days	2	2	2	9	14	14	14	15	15	15	12	5	117
Average relative humidity (%)	82	81	80	82	86	86	85	85	87	87	87	84	84
Source: Instituto de Hidrologia Meteorologia y Estudios Ambientales
