= Urban water management in Monterrey =

Monterrey, Mexico
- City
- Nicknames: Sultan of the North, The City of the Mountains
- Motto: Work Tempers the Spirit
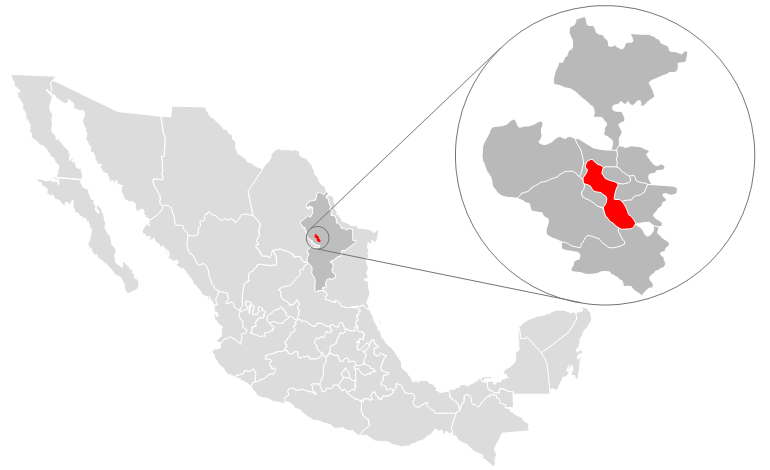
- Location of Monterrey in northern Mexico
- Coordinates: 25°40′N 100°18′W
- Country: Mexico
- State: Nuevo León
- Founded: 20 September 1596

Area
  - City: 860.70 km^{2} (332.32 sq mi)
  - Metro: 5,346.80 km^{2} (2,064.41 sq mi)
- Elevation: 537 m (1,762 ft)

Population (2005)
  - City: 1,133,814
  - Density: 1,989/km^{2} (5,150/sq mi)
  - Metro: 3,864,331
  - Metro density: 685/km^{2} (1,770/sq mi)
- Website: http://www.monterrey.gob.mx

Early in the 20th century, Monterrey, Mexico began a successful economic metamorphosis and growth pattern that remains an exception in Mexico. This all began with increased investments in irrigation that fueled a boom in agriculture and ranching for this northern Mexican city. The economic growth has fueled income disparity for the 3.86 million residents who live in the Monterrey Metro area (MMA). In addition, the rapid urbanization has taken a large toll on the water resources. In addressing many of this challenges, the city of Monterrey has become a model for sound and effective Integrated urban water management.

The challenges that Monterrey has confronted pertain to scarcity of surface water resources, poor water quality due to untreated industrial effluents, political cycles and term-limits which can limit long-term vision, and water disputes between urban and agricultural users. Monterrey has good groundwater "well-fields" that supply about 40% of the water demand for the city and generally are not over-exploited because of good connections to high-yield aquifer systems in the central parts of the "Curvatura de Monterrey". These wells are managed as storage reserves that can be used in time of drought, which is quite common in this region of Mexico.

Also unique to Monterrey is an arrangement made between farmers and the municipality, whereby the farmers grant the use of their water rights from the nearby Cuchillo reservoir and the municipal water utility SADM (Servicios de Agua y Drenaje de Monterrey) returns urban used and treated water to farmers for irrigation. This arrangement has benefited both parties since SADM supplements its water supply with high quality but internmitent supply from the Cuchillo reservoir and farmers receive a consistent and full of nutrients water for irrigation. The longer term outlook for the area is for urbanization to continue and water availability to decrease, therefore, new water management strategies will have to be created.

== Economic and social ==
During the first half of the 1900s, high investments in irrigation infrastructure had spurred agricultural development.

Referred to as the "Mexican miracle" from the 1940s through the 1970s, rapid economic and population growth transformed Monterrey into the second most important industrial city and second largest city in the country with a metropolitan population of 3.8 million. Monterrey's rapid urbanization was driven in part by the development of assembly plants (‘‘maquiladoras’’) and expanded significantly with the 1994 signing of the North American Free Trade Agreement (NAFTA). More specifically, the electronics industry became the largest industry in Monterrey and employs large volumes of industrial solvents in its productive process. These harmful chemicals are the most serious concern to surface and ground water in the Monterrey metro area §k§l§6Hola=D.

A water shortage in the late 1970s forced rationing on 750,000 people, most of whom were poor and already experienced low access to water. Forced water rationing spawned water protests that escalated to larger organized mass rallies, blockades, seizure of water service trucks, taking over of government buildings, and the holding hostage of water delivery drivers. Most of these actions were led by poor women and resulted in presidential action with the creation of the "Water for Everyone" (Agua para Todos) program that ushered in a new era of government spending that promised to bring water to every resident by 1985.

== Geography and climate ==
Monterrey is the capital city of the state of Nuevo León, and is situated approximately in the center of the state located in NE-Mexico and close to the Texas border. Monterrey has an elevation of 1,740 feet (530 m) above sea level and is located in a wide basin about 40 miles (64 km) across, surrounded to the north, west, and south by mountains. It has a semi-arid climate with a mean temperature of 75 °F (24 °C). However, most of the year temperatures are either warmer than 82 °F (28 °C), or cooler than 57 °F (14 °C). Monterrey's annual rainfall averages 584 mm (23 inches), with most of this total falling between June and October during the Atlantic hurricane season.

== Water availability ==
In 1995 the population of the San Juan watershed was 5m inhabitants, of which approximately 4m were in Metro Monterrey (MAM) and the population is expected to increase to 8.4m inhabitants by 2020. The population of MAM is located within 360 km^{2} across nine municipalities (Apodaca, Garcia, Escobedo, Guadalupe, Juarez, Monterrey, San Nicolas, Santa Catarina and San Pedro). Taking discharge and aquifer recharge, current population and average hydrology into account, the watershed possesses a water availability of 484 m^{3} per inhabitant per year and would be reduced to 230 m^{3} per inhabitant per year by the year 2020. The watershed therefore ranks amongst the poorest regions in regards to per capita water availability with countries such as Syria, Israel, and Saudi Arabia. Per capita water use estimates, including domestic, commercial, municipal, and industrial supplies, approach 290 liters per day per inhabitant for MAM. More specifically, the MAM receives 60% of their water supply from surface water while the remaining 40% comes from an extensive network of groundwater wells.

Surface water: The San Juan River with a surface area of 20,212 km^{2}, accounts for 31.5% of the entire surface area of the State of Nuevo León and is the largest and most important river in supplying water to Monterrey.

Storage Reservoirs: El Cuchillo dam (1,123,000,000 m^{3} active capacity) was constructed 75 km upstream of the Gómez dam and began operations in 1993 primarily to supply water to Monterrey. The Marte R. Gómez (MRG) dam, constructed in 1936 just upstream of the San Juan's confluence with the Río Bravo, serves as the Bajo Río San Juan (BRSJ) irrigation district's principal reservoir with 829,900,000 m^{3} active storage capacity. The José López Portillo ‘Cerro Prieto’, reservoir (ordinary storage capacity 393 mm^{3}) was built in the early 1980s in the adjacent Rio San Fernando watershed to supply the domestic and industrial water demands of Monterrey Metro Area (MAM), and was the first case of inter-basin transfer of freshwater to cope with shortages in Mexico's northeast.

Groundwater: Monterrey groundwater is accounted for by 46 deep wells (700 to 1000 m), 74 wells (<100 m), three water tunnels (Cola de Caballo I and II, San Francisco), and two major springs. The wells are located in the ‘wellfields’ (area with many boreholes) and contribute 40% of the total water that consumed in Monterrey. The three most important ‘wellfields" are the "Metropolitan Area of Monterey Wellfield", "Buenos Aires Wellfield", and "Mina Wellfield". The "Buenos Aires Wellfield" is the most important and contributes nearly half (46%) of the groundwater extracted (~ 1.5 m^{3}/s). It is located in a mountainous area of the "Huasteca Canyon" close to Monterrey. These ‘wellfields’ provide high quality water with a low cost of treatment.

According to data gathered by researchers at the Autonomous University of Nuevo León in Mexico, a medium annual precipitation of 538 mm/year within the Buenos Aires wellfield's catchment area is sufficient to recharge the aquifer while allowing for a discharge of around 1,600 L/s (400 gal.) that can safely be extracted at any given time. In 1998, the wellfield was operated at a mean discharge of 1,535 L/s. Due to higher extraction during most of the last 25 years however, dynamic levels in some of the wells have been observed to drop almost 100 meters over a period of several years indicating possible over-exploitation. While this does occur, the wellfields are quickly and completely recharged back to artesian conditions by hurricanes that have passed through in recent decades. Hurricanes do not appear in the hydrological balance that is based on 538 mm mean annual precipitation, therefore, long term aquifer reserves are considered to be significantly higher, implicating that extraction from the Buenos Aires wellfield can be considerably higher than 1,600 L/s without overexploiting the aquifer system.

Other sources of water include man-made tunnels and natural springs (3.20% of total supply); water culture programs, reusable water from wastewater treatment plants and rehabilitation of groundwater wells that now provide access to aquifers.

== Infrastructure ==
=== Drainage ===
Management of drainage infrastructure is the domain of SADM. Despite comparably low rainfall, Monterrey receives storms and hurricanes of great intensity during the months of May and July. Drainage has been under relative control during these storms. Flooding from storms is also a distinct possibility during September and October, therefore the government has sought to protect the citizens of Monterrey by building 160 km of drainage infrastructures including: 1) seven large storm water canals totaling 60 km; 2) three retention dams; 3) 47 smaller drainage branches totaling 70 km; 4) and 26 km of other municipal works.

=== Irrigation ===
The irrigation districts within the watersheds serving the MMA are the Bajo Río San Juan (BRSJ) irrigation district #26 (ID026) and the Bajo Río Bravo (BRB) irrigation district #25 (ID025). The farmers in these two irrigation districts receive water through a unique compensation arrangement that includes crop loss payments on the order of US$100 per hectare un-irrigable land due to the diversion of water to Monterrey plus an additional 60% of the diverted water to be returned to farmers as treated effluent via the Ayancual Creek, Pesquería River. While this has been a success, the Mexican irrigation sector will continue to face intense competition for water given: (a) low water productivity in agriculture leading decision-makers to allocate water to higher productivity uses particularly in cities; (b) priority accorded to the domestic use component of municipal water supply; (c) and Mexico's national interests in meeting its water sharing obligations with the United States.

In 1992, when the National Water Law (Ley de Aguas Nacionales) was enacted, management of water and irrigation systems became decentralized from the federal level to state and municipal levels. Irrigation districts, from that year on, became open to privatization and have since been responsible for maintaining themselves. Immediately, the lack of federal funding and resources to the irrigation districts around Monterrey caused problems such as lack of maintenance and management capacity. As the MMA continues to urbanize and demand for water supplies grow for both industrial and public use, irrigation districts 025 and 026 are seeing their irrigated lands contract.

== Water use and coverage ==
Water from the Río Bravo including the San Juan sub-basin are used as follows: 78% for agriculture, 12% for urban-public supply, 8% for industry, and 2% for Livestock. Monterrey has 99% coverage in water supply and 98% in sewer and close to 100% in wastewater treatment. Despite high coverage and efficiency rates, the city continues investing in expanding its capacity and improving its operations. Recent statistics show mean domestic water consumption for the city at about 12% of total discharge (Mexico average = 17%) or 10,400 liter per second (~2750 gallons) with lows in winter of 9,300 L/s (2,457 gallons) and high peaks in summer of 12,100 L/s (~3200 gallons). SADM estimated 2002 daily per capita domestic water consumption to be 130 L (32.5 gal.), down 18% from 1997 due to constant supply of 335 million m^{3}/year even though there has been a constant increase in population.

== Water challenges ==
=== Pollution ===
The fast pace of economic growth for the Monterrey Metro Area (MMA) has placed an increasing toll on water quality as industry (ex. Electronics) has discharged untreated industrial effluents and population has grown at a faster rate than the rest of Mexico. Consequently, availability of clean water resources has been impaired by contamination from industrial and residential sources along the Rio San Juan. Another river that first became polluted from industrial effluents and then completely dry from overuse is the Santa Catarina River.

Adding to the problem, a municipal wastewater treatment plant (WWTP) operated by SADM in Montemorelos, 45 miles southeast of Monterrey, is unable to make the capital investment required to expand unit operations and processes and therefore cannot meet the current needs of a growing community resulting in a heavily overloaded plant producing effluent that does not meet discharge standards of 30 mg/L BOD and Total suspended solids (TSS). In response, biological treatment technologies were deployed at the Montemorelos 1 WWTP without further significant capital increases. Positive results were observed after utilizing the biological treatment. Specifically, after 8 weeks of treatment, the Montemorelos 1 WWTP monthly average of influent BOD decreased 49% from 318 mg/L to 161 mg/L and influent TSS decreased 20% from 228 mg/L to 184 mg/L. Effluent BOD decreased 92% from 116 mg/L to 9 mg/L and effluent TSS decreased 80% from 58 mg/L to 12 mg/L.

=== Water shortage and scarcity ===
Evaporation and droughts have played a significant role in Monterrey's ongoing struggle to acquire adequate quantities of water. Because Monterrey is located in a semi-arid region where surface water is scarce and rainfall is infrequent, high temperatures stimulate high degree of water loss through evaporation from bodies of water and evapotranspiration from surrounding flora. In El Cuchillo, the largest reservoir in the area, water evaporation is equal to the amount extracted for drinking water at least five months of the year due to a large water surface and shallow depth of the reservoir. The impact of water loss through evaporation is very high as more than half of Monterrey's water supply comes from surface water.

=== Water disputes ===
El Cuchillo dam is the centerpiece of the basin's water management infrastructure and has become the flashpoint of a multi-faceted water dispute between the states of Nuevo León and Tamaulipas as well as between urban and agricultural water interests in the basin. An article from a 1999 issue of the publication, Borderlines, does a good job of describing why there is conflict between the states of Nuevo León and Tamaulipas. Until the construction of the El Cuchillo project, the reservoir created by the Marte R. Gómez Dam, known in the U.S. as Sugar Lake, had provided a relatively clean source of drinking water to Reynosa, Tamaulipas and irrigation water to the 26th Irrigation District, which surrounds Sugar Lake. But since coming online, El Cuchillo has devastated northern Tamaulipas. As a result of the diversion upstream, water that once supported rural users downstream has virtually dried up. Approximately 300 fishing families who earned their living from Sugar Lake lost their livelihoods, as have some local merchants and motel owners. Likewise, farmers in the 26th Irrigation District have lost their crops over several seasons and affected crop lands are estimated as high as 70,000. As many as 20,000 families may have been affected. Also, Reynosa's drinking water now comes from the Rio Grande, which is extremely polluted. To date, the Mexican government denies any responsibility and blames the problems on the ongoing drought.

== Response to challenges ==
In response to the contamination of the San Juan River, the government of Nuevo León initiated a sanitation program in 1994 entitled Plan Monterrey IV, which included the construction of three large wastewater treatment plants and the discharge of municipal effluents and treated water to other Rio San Juan tributaries. The public perception has remained, however, that the San Juan River is still a polluted river.

Disputes over water between agriculture and municipal needs have been mitigated to some degree as the Monterrey water utility, SADM, now returns treated effluent back to the farming districts. This solution seems to be working for both sectors; however, the program and strategy will have to be re-evaluated as water resources become more scarce.

SADM has developed a program to replace micro-meters and valves on its secondary water network. One goal of the program was to replace 700,000 water meters by April 2003 while another goal was to increase water supply to the city by 2,500 L/s. Actions taken to achieve these stated goals included repairing leaks in the system, promoting water re-use in industry, extracting water from new wells, using new sources which contain sulfured water, reducing urban consumption by 5% and using technologies to avoid evaporation in dams.

== Institutional framework ==
SADM (Servicios de Agua y Drenaje de Monterrey) is the water and sewer utility and supplies water in the Monterrey metro area (MMA). SADM is an autonomous public utility under the government of the state of Nuevo León and is the acting water authority in throughout the MMA.

A particular type of Water User Association (WUA) called ‘‘módulos’’ propose operation and maintenance (O&M) plans for irrigation systems while also supporting farmers with procurement and marketing plans.

New SADM tariff agreements were signed in 2007 that became effective January 1, 2008. The first agreement maintained current rates for monthly domestic water consumption between 0–10 m^{3}. Another agreement enacted a 7.5% increase for all uses ranging from commercial, industrial, public and private institutions, and government dependencies. many more specifics of the 2007 Agreement can be located and downloaded at the SADM website concerning their tariff structures.

IBWC (International Boundary and Water Commission) has responsibility for applying the boundary and water treaties between the United States and Mexico. The IBWC is an international body composed of the United States Section and the Mexican Section, each headed by an Engineer-Commissioner appointed by his/her respective president. The commissioners report to their respective federal authorities (State Department in the case of the US, and Secretario de Relaciones Exteriores in Mexico), but operationally work with state and local agencies on water management and allocation. Each Section is administered independently of the other. The IBWC is important here because the surface water of Monterrey is supplied by the El Cuchillo reservoir receiving water from the San Juan River, a major tributary of the Rio Grande. The Mexican Water Treaty signed in 1944 with the United States covers all shared water resources, principally the Río Bravo/Grande and the Colorado in the West.

== See also ==
- Water resources management in Mexico
- Irrigation in Mexico
- Water management in Greater Mexico City
- Water management in the Metropolitan Region of São Paulo
- Integrated urban water management in Medellín, Colombia
- Urban water management in Bogotá, Colombia
- Integrated urban water management in Buenos Aires, Argentina
- Water management in greater Tegucigalpa
- Integrated urban water management in Aracaju, Brazil
