= Integrated urban water management in Buenos Aires, Argentina =

Integrated urban water management (IUWM) in Buenos Aires is not unlike many large urban areas in Latin America where in past decades, more focus was placed on just a few sectors or perhaps only one sector. The water management philosophy in Buenos Aires has evolved to one that is integrating efforts in reducing water pollution, improving stormwater management, adding drainage infrastructure, and improving water supply and sanitation (WSS). Primary challenges in urban water management continue to be flood control and stormwater management as Buenos Aires is situated in the low-lying pampas region where heavy rain is expected all year long. Adding to the challenges, urbanization has outpaced planning and development in the various water sectors. Efforts have been made to control the major tributaries of Río de la Plata such as channelizing and building culverts into urban rivers, however, this has increased flooding as the natural meander and saturating ability of the rivers have been lost. Rapid urbanization and very large quantities of industrial discharge have also caused severe contamination of the water basins that Buenos Aires is built upon. The Matanza-Riachuelo river (MR), a tributary of the Río de la Plata (La Plata River), is a prime example and has become the most contaminated basin in Argentina.

In response to water pollution and flooding challenges, the Government of Argentina (GoA) is working with the World Bank to address industrial water pollution by providing technical assistance and mentoring to the 50 worst industrial polluters which represent 95% of the total effluent. Oversight and monitoring is provided by the Matanza-Riachuelo River Basin Authority (ACUMAR). The Urban Flood Prevention and Drainage Program (APL) is the government's commitment to flood prevention and risk management and falls within the framework of the Buenos Aires Hydraulic Master Plan. The "Master Plan" focuses on implementing non-structural measures throughout the entire city.

Recent history in Buenos Aires urban water management is notable for its move to privatization of the water and sanitation systems. Signed in 1992, the Buenos Aires water concession was a unique example of water privatization on a large urban scale for its rapid implementation. The concession handed control of water and sanitation systems to the French company Suez S.A. Generating controversy for its size, the privatization was successful in that improvements were made to water and service coverage while efficiencies were gained within the water company itself. Additionally, a near 27% reduction in water tariffs quickly followed after the signing of the concession. After a renegotiation of terms in 1997 that generated wide criticism, the concession was canceled in 2006. Water and sewer provisions in the Buenos Aires Metro Area (BAMA) have since been handled by a conglomerate of companies called Water of Greater Buenos Aires (Aguas del Gran Buenos Aires).

== Economic and social conditions ==
Argentina enjoyed four years of rapid recovery from the economic and social crisis of 2001-02, which was one of the most severe losses of income and downturns in living standards on record. Effective macroeconomic management, focused on the generation of primary fiscal surpluses, has helped to sustain this strong performance. Consequently, average real GDP increased by nearly 9% per year between 2003 and 2006, surpassing the maximum GDP reached in 1998. Poverty and unemployment have fallen substantially from their peaks during the economic crisis. Poverty has declined to about 31% from a high of over 57% in 2002, while unemployment fell to near 11% from 21% in 2003.

The period in Argentina between 1990 and 1993 was a time of transition away from social policies, government support devices, and welfare systems to an IMF-backed structural adjustment in economic and market policies. During this time, crime became a serious problem with the creation of an informal criminal economy that sought to take advantage of a lack of economic authority. Crime rates rose 286% between 1992 and 1995 and in 1995 the former President, Carlos Menem was re-elected with international praise for achieving low inflation, privatizing state-run companies and the currency peg to the dollar. Crime has continued to grow as a considerable social concern in the aftermath of the 2001 recession and a reversal of the currency peg where hyperinflation ensued. Consequently, the arms and drug trade has flourished and slums in Buenos Aires grew by 114% during the 1990s to around 113,000 people. These slums lack basic public services and law enforcement, and have become safe havens for criminal activities.

The Matanza-Riachuelo river (MR) basin is home to Argentina's largest concentrations of urban poor. Of the approximately 3.5 million inhabitants in the basin, 1.2 million live below the poverty line. An estimated 10 percent of the total population in the MR Basin lives in informal settlements, often in flood-prone areas and/or near open garbage dumps. The poorest populations living alongside the river are in constant contact with numerous contaminants ranging from untreated organic waste to toxic industrial chemicals.

== Geography and climate ==
Buenos Aires lies in the pampa region of Argentina and is bordered on the eastern and north-east sides by the Río de la Plata, on the south and southeast side by the Riachuelo and to the northwest, west and Southwest by the Avenida General Paz, which is a long highway that separates the Buenos Aires Province from the city.

The region was formerly transected by small tributaries and some lagoons, some of which were refilled and others piped. Among the most important small tributary basins are the Maldonado, Vega, Medrano, Cildañez and White. In 1908 many of these tributaries were channelized as floods damaged the city's infrastructure. Beginning in 1919, most creeks were enclosed. Notably, the Maldonado was re-engineered in 1954 to flow underground in tubes and currently runs underneath Juan B. Justo Avenue.

The city has a humid subtropical climate and the average annual temperature is 17.6 °C (63.7 °F). The city gets 1,147 mm (45 in) of rainfall per year. Rain can be expected at any time of year with March being the wettest month (5.3 inches) and June the driest month (2.5 inches).

== The Buenos Aires water concession of 1992 ==
The signing of the Buenos Aires water and sanitation concession in 1992 attracted worldwide attention and was the source of considerable controversy for its scale of private participation in the Argentine water and sanitation sector. In addition to being one of the world's largest water concessions, the Buenos Aires concession has remained interesting for a number of other reasons. First, the rapid implementation of the Buenos Aires concession contrasted with the slow movement towards private participation in other large urban water systems, such as Santiago or Lima. Second, the reform was widely acclaimed for generating major improvements in the water and sanitation sectors, including wider coverage, better service, more efficient operation of the company, and a reduction in waste. What makes these improvements especially striking is the immediate 26.9 percent reduction in water tariffs that followed the signing. Finally, the Buenos Aires case is of interest because the contract was renegotiated in 1997, provoking criticisms of the original bid and the regulation. More recently, the concession was revoked in 2006 and remained under arbitration in 2008.

== Infrastructure ==
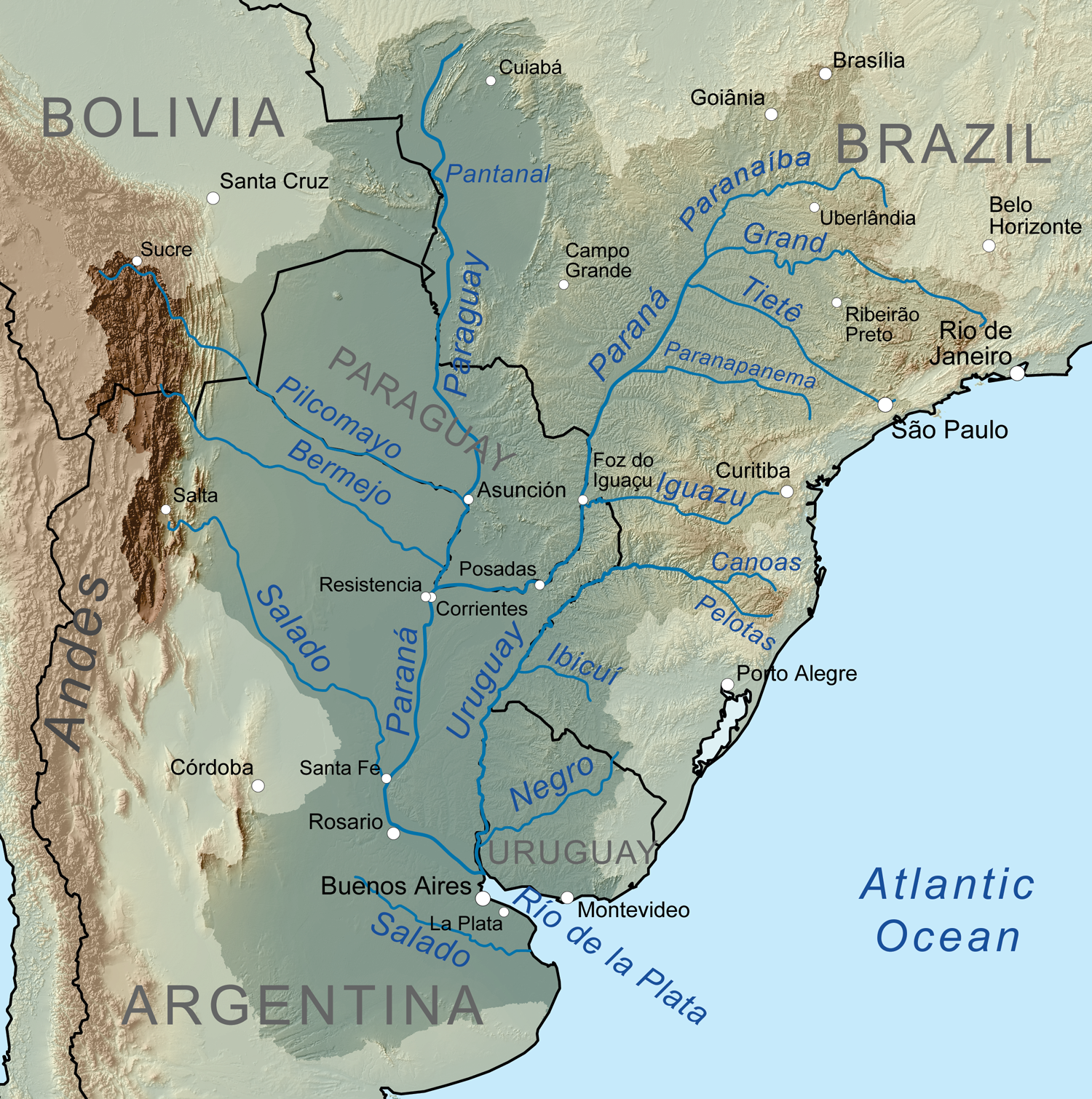
Image of the Río de la Plata basin

=== Water supply ===
Over most of its history, Buenos Aires has remained a city with a quality water supply delivered by the immense Río de la Plata and surrounding high plains that have abundant high quality groundwater below them. In the outskirts of the city, the inhabitants have good access to wells and piped water.

Surface Water: The La Plata sub-basin's catchment area is 130,200 km^{2} and constitutes (4.2%) of the world's fifth largest river basin – the La Plata, extending over 3.1 million km^{2}, five countries (Argentina, Bolivia, Brazil, Paraguay, and Uruguay), almost 50 major cities, and supporting over 100 million inhabitants. The mouth of the La Plata River is 230 km wide and separates Argentina from Uruguay. The three main watercourses that form the base structure for the region's drainage network are the Luján, Reconquista, and Matanza-Riachuelo Rivers. The Luján River, 128 km, has the largest catchment area of nearly 3,300 km^{2} and runs from southeast-northeast before discharging into the La Plata River. The Reconquista River is 82 km long, drains a catchment of 1,738 km^{2} (the lower 40% includes urban and semi-urban populations), and discharges into the Luján River. The Matanza-Riachuelo River (known as Riachuelo from its lower catchment) is 510 km long and eventually discharges into the La Plata River.

Groundwater: Over many decades a significant proportion of the water-supply of the Buenos Aires Metro Area (BAMA) was obtained from three major groundwater reservoirs found at different depths, quantities and qualities. The Pampeano, Puelches, and the Parana account for these three reservoirs of groundwater and reached their pinnacle of use in the late 1980s. At that time BAMA underwent a switch from groundwater to imported surface water which has led to groundwater levels to rise to the point of frequent flooding because of the close proximity of the water level to the surface.

=== Drinking water ===
Aguas y Saneamientos Argentinos is the primary water service provider in the metropolitan area serving the city of Buenos Aires and 17 municipalities, while Aguas Bonaerenses serves the remaining municipalities. Almost 95% of the water supply comes from the La Plata River (4,442,065 m^{3}/day), while the rest is extracted from the ground (231,416 m^{3}/day) and is treated at one of three plants. AySA is building two additional water treatment plants that will increase daily capacity by 947,040 m^{3}.

=== Stormwater and drainage ===
Due to rapid urbanization, topographic elements, and the occurrence of severe storm events in Buenos Aires, flooding has become one of the most serious problems affecting the normal life of Buenos Aires citizens. Extensive and frequent damage to urban, commercial, and industrial infrastructure is also prevalent. The continuous increase in the degree of impermeable surfaces (only 10% of the city is open and green space) in the city has altered normal functioning of the stormwater drainage network. Today, the system cannot adequately convey the stormwater runoff generated after a storm.

Each of the three most important catchments (Maldonado, Medrano and Vega) are drained by a large drainage pipe that follows in the direction of the former watercourses. Typical dimensions range from 15 m to 20 m wide and 3 m to 4 m high with an internal supporting structure of columns and beams that results in interference of stormwater flow and can cause back up and increased flooding. The city counts approximately 1400 km (870 mi.) of stormwater conveyance covering an area of 30,000 ha (74,000 acres) with 7,000 sub-catchments structures, 12,000 street-level storm drains, and 6,000 sewer drains.

=== Wastewater treatment ===
AySA has four wastewater treatment plants (WWTP) that currently treat only 5.3% of wastewater before discharging it into the La Plata River. To improve this situation, AySA is in the midst of constructing another wastewater treatment plant Del Bicentenario, which will increase the City's treatment capacity by 120,000 m^{3} per hour (current output is 2,249,494 m^{3}/day).

== Water challenges ==
=== Pollution ===
The Matanza-Riachuelo river (MR), a tributary of the Río de la Plata (La Plata River), is the most contaminated river basin in Argentina and considered one of the most polluted water bodies in the world. Pollution levels in Buenos Aires’ rivers are so high that they have been considered “open sewers”, making pollution the greatest environmental risk for the metropolitan area. Pollution levels have increased steadily as urbanization and industrial growth have continuously increased in the metropolitan area of Buenos Aires. It is estimated that more than 4,000 industrial facilities are located in the lower and middle sections of the basin. Almost all of these industries discharge untreated effluents into the drainage system or directly into the MR River. In addition to high levels of organic pollution, these discharges contribute toxic contaminants such as heavy metals from petrochemical industries, tanneries, and meat processing facilities. More specifically, the Riacheuleo has levels of Lead, Zinc and Chrome 50 times higher than the legal limit in Argentina; 25% is from industrial sewage and waste, while the remaining 75% originates from domestic sources. The sudden onset of environmental and social degradation of the MR basin has resulted from limited investment in public infrastructure, poor environmental management, lack of adequate urban and industrial planning, and limited public infrastructure investment.

=== Flooding and drainage ===
Flooding is the most prominent natural hazard in Argentina, and along with the littoral provinces, Buenos Aires is a very high risk area. Across the country, an according to 1998 statistics from Swiss-Re, Argentina ranks 18th in the world in potential flood losses, in excess of US$3 billion in 1998. Argentina is also one of 14 countries whose potential losses from floods are greater than 1 percent of GDP. Specifically in Buenos Aires, flooding occurs on average about twice per year. These floods are due to two causes: the condition of the drainage network, and strong winds from the southeast, (sudestadas), which produce a rise of the Rio de la Plata high above its average. Its waters then spill over the land, flooding the coastal areas inhabited by the poor. From the topographical standpoint, the City of Buenos Aires and its suburbs are located in a periphery of rolling grasslands, characterized by its limited slope toward the Rio de la Plata. The area was originally carved by small watercourses that either drain into the Rio de la Plata or in the two most important bodies of water in the area: the Reconquista and Matanza-Riachuelo. All of the watercourses have the special characteristics of a plain region: short water courses with little permanent flow, irregular routes, and broad flood valleys. The layout of the watercourses defines flood-prone areas, where flooding of the following tributary areas often occurs. The Maldonado (covering 5,050 hectares in Buenos Aires), Medrano, (covering 2,050 ha in Buenos Aires and 4,600 in total); White-Vega (covering 1,777 ha); and Cildáñez are important basins covering Buenos Aires.

=== Institutional weakness ===
The 1992 Buenos Aires water concession was meant to attract private companies who could bring the needed infrastructure and service upgrades; however, growth of service networks has been lower than planned, particularly in low-income sectors of metropolitan Buenos Aires. Governance issues, institutional weaknesses and lack of control mechanisms are responsible for the failure of the Buenos Aires water concession.

== Response to challenges ==
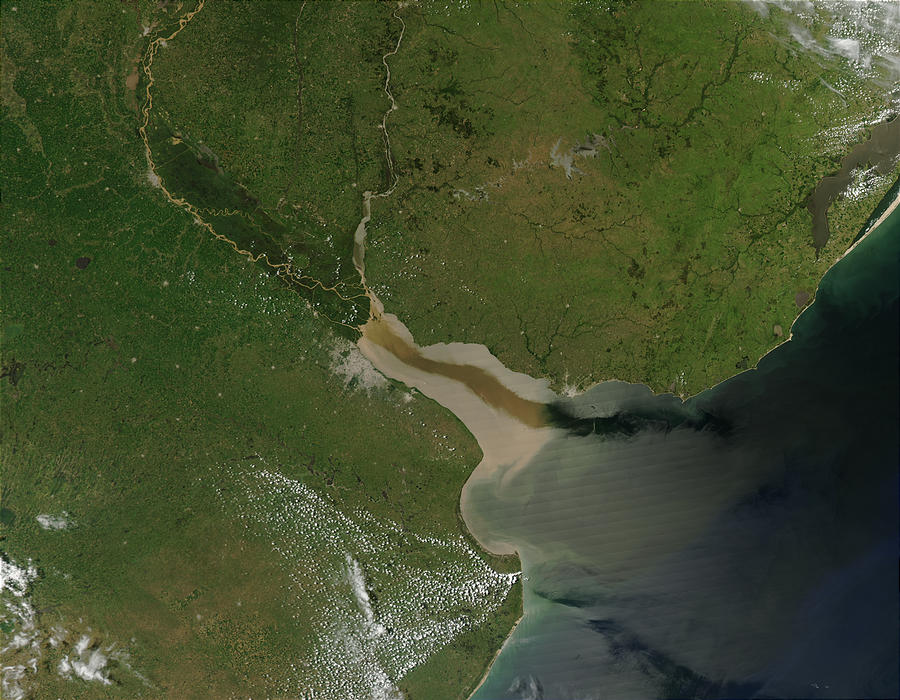
Satellite image of Río de la Plata

=== Pollution ===
The Government of Argentina (GoA) with World Bank assistance has aimed to reduce industrial wastewater discharge (organic as well as toxic effluents) that directly enter the MR River. Over the next 15–20 years these efforts will contribute to the environmental recovery of the river. They will focus on the 50 main industrial polluters that contribute ~95% of the total industrial organic load (approximately 70 percent of the total organic load) discharged to the MR River and a further 170 industries with the highest toxic load currently discharged into the MR River. A combination of technical assistance to improve monitoring, control, and enforcement by the MR Basin Authority will be instituted. The idea is to help in collecting baseline data and carry out diagnostic exercises. Support will be provided for private sector investments in pollution control and cleaner production processes, targeting small-to-medium enterprises (SMEs) that typically pollute more per unit of output and have weaker financial and technical capacity to comply with environmental regulations.

=== Flooding and drainage ===
The Urban Flood Prevention and Drainage Program (APL) is the result of a government commitment to flood prevention and risk management. The program places emphasis on risk prevention, and developing a strategy that guides targeted Provinces from protection to a full risk management scheme. This program targets urban areas from the most exposed provinces at a cost of US$200 million. The first phase of this project was directed towards the City of Buenos Aires where a portion of the funding was a $130 million direct loan from the World Bank. Overall government strategy beginning in 1992 has aimed at evolving from a disaster response to a risk prevention approach, introducing a water basin approach and strengthening of the institutions. The program is being implemented within the framework of the Buenos Aires Hydraulic Master Plan, which involves the entire city in implementing non-structural measures and then the Maldonado Basin for the first stage of the structural measures. Planned investments will benefit about 500,000 people over an area that suffers losses estimated at US$50 million annually.

=== Legal initiatives ===
Law 26128 was approved in 2006 by the National Congress of Argentina and created MR River Basin Authority (ACUMAR). Law 26128 also designated the Secretary of Environment to be the acting authority. Law 26128 was a result of the GoA giving a high priority to the environmental and social recovery of the MR basin. Additionally, this recently passed legislation is a response to the lack of a strong institutional framework.

In 2004, a group of residents living in the CMR area filed a claim against the national government, the Province of Buenos Aires, the government of Buenos Aires, and 44 businesses for damages suffered as a result of pollution from the Matanza-Riachuelo River. The lawsuit resulted in a landmark decision from the Supreme Court in 2008, which ruled on the side of the residents and determined that the defendants were liable for restoration and future prevention of environmental damage in the river basin. The Environment and Natural Resources Foundation (FARN) participated in the case as a third party, along with various other civil society organizations. Throughout the entire process, FARN played a vital role in analyzing the defendants’ submissions, submitting briefs and "amparos" (claims of constitutional violations), and coordinated the efforts of the different organizations. Since the ruling, in which the Supreme Court named FARN as a "permanent independent monitoring body for Riachuelo cleanup," the organization has maintained its leadership role.

== Institutional framework ==
AGBA (Aguas del Gran Buenos Aires) is the conglomerate of water and sewer companies that provide service to 1.65 million inhabitants in the Buenos Aires Metro Area or BAMA. AGBA is made of the following subsidiary companies: Impregilo (43%), Dragados (27%), Aguas de Bilbao Bizkaia (20%) and the remaining 10% is owned by the employees who are organized under the name "Programa de Participación Accionaria del Personal" (PPAP).

ACUMAR is the Matanza-Riachuelo River Basin Authority and includes 17 different governments offices such as the Secretary of Environment of the Federal Government, multiple provinces of Buenos Aires, the city of Buenos Aires, and the 14 municipalities involved in the basin and the civil society. ACUMAR has been legally provided with sufficient management and enforcement power in addressing the coordination issues of the MR river basin.

SAyDS (Secretaría de Ambiente y Desarrollo Sustentable) is the Secretariat of the Environment and Sustainable Development.

AySA (Agua y Saneamiento Argentinos S.A.) is the National Water and Sanitation utility of Argentina and works with ACUMAR on implementation of water projects within their concessions of Buenos Aires.

ETOSS (Ente Tripartito de Obras y Servicios Sanitarios) is a regulatory body whose principal mission is that of the regulation and control of the utility contract and the overseeing of the interaction between the various actors involved in the utility contract. ETOSS consists of representatives from the national government, the province of Buenos Aires, and the city of Buenos Aires.

The United Coordinator for the Technical Management and International Finance handles (Unidade Coordinación para la Gestión Técnica y Financiera Internacional-UCOFI) financial management and procurement responsibilities for the entire Matanza-Riachuelo World Bank project in Buenoa Aires and has experience and knowledge of managing projects financed by international financial institutions.

=== Tariffs and reinvestment ===
AySA's tariff system is based on a fixed rate plus metered consumption system. The rate structure classifies users according to category (residential or nonresidential), the zone where the building is located, and the services provided; sewer services cost twice the amount of the fixed fee for drinking water service; finally, low-income customers are eligible for a subsidy. As of 2007, only 12.8% of the connections were billed under a metering system, thereby encouraging relatively high consumption. In 2010, AySA collected US$103,478,000 from users and re-invested US$195,144,000. AySA's users are 88% residential (the majority of which are concentrated in the lowest socio-economic strata), 10.8% nonresidential, and 1.2% unowned land.

== Multi-lateral assistance ==
In the mid-1990s, the government completed a comprehensive MR Environmental Management Plan (EMP) and received a US$250 million Inter-American Development Bank (IDB) loan to help finance implementation of the EMP objectives. However, 12 years after the beginning of the project, the IDB had only disbursed US$10 million, and is only now committing another US$90 million for urgent clean-up activities (the remaining balance having been long reallocated). The Government of Argentina (GoA) concluded that the lack of an adequate institutional and legal framework to coordinate the involvement of different government jurisdictions has been a major obstacle to implementing the EMP.

The World Bank is engaged with the GoA in a multi-phase US$840 million project with the following objectives (i) improve sewerage services in the MR River Basin and other parts of the Province and City of Buenos Aires by expanding transport and treatment capacity; (ii) support a reduction of industrial discharges to the MR River, through the provision of industrial conversion grants to small and medium enterprises; (iii) promote improved decision-making for environmentally sustainable land use and drainage planning, and to pilot urban drainage and land use investments, in the M-R River Basin; and (iv) strengthen ACUMAR's institutional framework for ongoing and sustainable clean-up of the MR River Basin.

== See also ==
- Water resources management in Uruguay
- Water supply and sanitation in Argentina
- Integrated urban water management in Monterrey, Mexico
- Water management in Greater Mexico City
- Water management in the Metropolitan Region of São Paulo
- Integrated urban water management in Medellín, Colombia
- Urban water management in Bogotá, Colombia
- Water management in greater Tegucigalpa
- Integrated urban water management in Aracaju, Brazil
