= Water management in greater Tegucigalpa =

Tegucigalpa
- Nicknames: Tegus; Tepaz; Cerro de Plata (Silver Mountain)
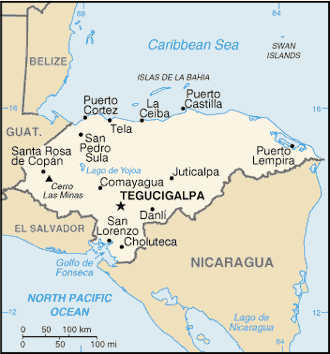
- Country: Honduras
- Department: Francisco Morazán
- Municipality: Distrito Central
- Founded: 1578
- Capital: 1880
- Merged as Distrito Central: 1938

Government
  - Type: Democratic Municipality

Area
  - City: 750 km^{2} (290 sq mi)
- Elevation: 990 m (3,250 ft)

Population (2006)
  - City: 894,000
  - Metro: 1,324,000

Tegucigalpa, the capital city of Honduras, is located in a central mountainous region having a tropical climate within the Choluteca river basin. Major rivers supplying the capital city are the Choluteca and Guacerique rivers, which then fill the Concepción and Laureles storage reservoirs. With an urban population of approximately 900,000 and another 400,000 living in the surrounding neighborhoods, Tegucigalpa is being confronted with an array of imposing integrated urban water management (IUWM) challenges. Potable water coverage is poor, with around 40% of the city's residents without access to a piped water supply, relying instead on more costly water trucks and bottled water.

Furthermore, the capital city lies within a geographic depression amongst the surrounding mountain range, making the city prone to flooding and landslides; both occurred simultaneously in 1998 when Hurricane Mitch passed through Tegucigalpa, killing 180 people and leaving many more displaced. Other critical IUWM issues include: inadequate water quality and quantity levels; deteriorating watersheds, rivers, and storage reservoirs; inefficient water use; rapid and poorly planned urbanization; intensive competition between industrial and domestic water users as well as irrigation demands; and industrial and domestic effluents discharging into the rivers, tributaries, and reservoirs without treatment.

Overcoming these challenges has been difficult for SANAA (Servicio Autonomo Nacional de Acueductos y Alcantarillados), the state-run water and sewage utility in Tegucigalpa. SANAA's funding and roles are becoming uncertain as Honduras continues to decentralize SANAA's functions and transfer SANAA assets to municipalities. The decentralization process began with the 2003 Water Framework Law and further progressed with the passing of new legal and institutional initiatives such as the General Water Law (2009) and subsequent National Water Authority.

The General Water Law and the National Water Authority are efforts to address IUWM challenges in Tegucigalpa and throughout Honduras. The National Water Authority replaces the General Directorate of Water Resources and will continue with an oversight function of the decentralized institutional framework including the work of SANAA.

== Social and economic factors ==
Over the last few decades, Honduras and the capital city of Tegucigalpa have urbanized faster than any other Central American country or city. Much of this is due to the fact that Honduras had until then remained one of the least urbanized countries in the Americas, making it ripe for high rates of urbanization. Between 1985 and 1990, the urbanization rate was at 5%; although it has decreased, forecasts from the United Nations Population Division estimate rapid urbanization through 2010.

Tegucigalpa's population density in 2001 was at 99 persons per hectare. However, the distribution of inhabitants varies greatly throughout different areas of the city. In general, people avoid living on steep hillsides where landslides are of considerable concern or in the river valley where flooding is a constant danger.

On the economic side, structural shifts from agricultural to industrial bases have necessitated movements to an urban setting for much of the population. Between 1983 and 2003, the percentage of Honduras’ population employed in agriculture declined from 43% to 34%. This has increased pressure on water supplies and decreased the quality of treatment. Tegucigalpa also struggles with costly inefficiencies across its water resources, stormwater management, sanitation and solid waste services. A recent World Bank estimate has shown that the total economic cost to the city to exceeds US$60 million per year.

Compared to other countries in the Americas, GNP per capita is low but increasing and will likely continue to grow. The struggling US and global economies are having a substantial negative impact on the local economy, as remittances, exports and foreign direct investments are contracting. Real GDP growth was projected to fall to around 2.0 percent by end-2009 while per capita income stands at US$1,700.

== Geography and climate ==
Tegucigalpa is located in a central mountainous region within a mild tropical zone. There are two primary seasons during the year: a wet season from May to October, and a dry season from November to April. Temperatures are moderate, with average lows around 60 °F and average highs around 70 °F. Rainfall averages range from 0.2 inches in February to 7.30 inches in September with annual rainfall averages from 36 to 39 inches.

By comparison, FAO (Food and Agriculture Organization of the United States) statistics show average rainfall throughout the rest of Honduras at about 60 inches per year while in Central America, the average is much higher at 94 inches per year. Rainfall averages in the whole of Latin America are 61 inches annually.

== Infrastructure ==
=== Water supply ===
Tegucigalpa, which suffers from ongoing water supply challenges, receives water from major rivers that run through the city. The Choluteca and Guacerique rivers supply water to the Concepción and Laureles reservoirs providing Tegucigalpa with a combined flow of 2 cubic meters per second (m^{3}/s). The system is predominantly gravity-fed, with limited pumping to strategically placed elevated tanks to increase water pressure in some areas.

Water is also taken from the Picacho and Sabacuante tributaries. In Tegucigalpa, there are more than 500 perforated wells, which yield between 1–3 liters per second (L/s) of groundwater. Some have greater yields of between 2 and 20 L/s.

=== Water use & availability ===
World Bank research indicates that the annual water availability in the natural watershed of Tegucigalpa is 175 (m^{3}/year/inhabitant), concentrated over a six-month rainy season. Year-to-year storage capacity has not kept up with population growth, which has increased sevenfold in the last 50 years. In 2006, water use in Tegucigalpa was 227 liters per capita per day (L/c/d), and by comparison, it is 545 L/c/d in smaller municipal systems.

Water resources fall short of the City's demand; recent estimations have shown the city's water supply has a deficit of about 60 million m^{3}/year or about 2 m^{3}/s, mostly during the dry season (close to 50% of total demand). As a result, severe water restriction programs are imposed during most summers, leading to highly discontinuous water service.

A large percentage of Tegucigalpa's poorest households (38%) do not have access to SANAA's piped water services, where, by contrast, only 2% of the wealthiest do not have access to SANAA's piped water. Use of bottled water is quite important in Tegucigalpa as a whole, but only 12% of the poor use this option, as compared to 70% of the more affluent. Water storage towers filled by SANAA trucks are not widely used by the poor because the water is expensive. Only 3% of households report obtaining water from the water towers.

=== Sanitation and water treatment ===
Sanitation services throughout Tegucigalpa and surrounding areas are poor. Even though SANAA estimates that 70% of the city is connected to the municipal sewer system, the coverage area is very low in outlying neighborhoods and service quality is not good. Those not connected to the sewer system utilize either a latrine or septic tank. Choluteca, Chiquito, and Guacerique rivers are adversely affected by ongoing urbanization of Tegucigalpa, and so by consequence, the Laureles and La Concepción storage reservoirs have become quite contaminated. (Source: Grant funding request for the Water Partnership Program) The estimated total length of the sewerage system is approximately of 840 km. Tegucigalpa has 2 wastewater treatment plants operating with a total capacity of about 400 L/s; however, these plants treat less than 17% of total wastewater.

This is a problematic situation and further exacerbates the City's environmental problems. In particular, one of the two wastewater plants within the city was funded by the EU and built by an Italian/Honduran consortium using an aerobic treatment system with capacity to treat 100 L/s in a preliminary treatment phase and in a second treatment phase, the plant can treat another 100 L/s. This plant is currently managed by an Italian firm and it was expected that the plant would be transferred to the city of Tegucigalpa after the transition of management roles from SANAA to the municipality is completed. There were problems with the plant however, due to the plant's design and furthermore, SANAA was set to possibly reject the transition of the plant and associated management roles. The SANAA Director stated that the treatment plant did not meet the expectations outlined in the contract.

== Water challenges ==
Despite the announcement in his inauguration from then-President Manuel Zelaya that his government would invest 1% of the general budget in the protection of natural resources, water remained absent from that promise. The manager of SANAA, Mr. Jorge Mendez, speaking at the U.S. Embassy on the management of water and sanitation, stated that, "Honduras has moved rather poorly on the issue." Mr. Mendez asserted that Honduras is well behind in achieving the objectives set by the Millennium Development Goals (MDGS). He urged his country to give the same level of importance to water supply challenges that is given to sanitation and that the two issues need to be worked on in parallel or neither challenge would be met.

The June 2009 coup d'etat, in which the Honduran military removed President Zelaya by force, did not have a severe effect on urban water management in Greater Tegucigalpa. Notably though, international developments banks suspended ongoing projects during this political instability. Also a challenge, the mayor of Tegucigalapa and Honduran President represent opposing parties and this creates a lack of political will in addressing the political divide between SANAA and the municipality of Tegucigalpa. Lack of political will and a lack of proper capacity to adequately address urban water challenges further exacerbate the difficult challenges that the capital city must confront.

=== Insufficient water availability ===
The 2004 calculated volume of water flowing from the Choluteca, Chiquito, and Guacerique rivers to the Laureles and La Concepción reservoirs was not enough to meet the demand of the more than one million inhabitants living in the capital city. A 2002 World Bank study suggested that the average water availability deficit was approximately 18% in the wet season, and rose to 45% during the dry season.

Local news stories from the past ten years are full of periodic coverage of forced rationing and shortages caused by seasonal drought, weather patterns (e.g. El Nino), and natural disasters (e.g. Hurricane Mitch). Supply problems are further complicated by other important factors, including: urban and agricultural contamination of watersheds; competition between agricultural uses (i.e. irrigation) and urban uses (i.e. domestic, industrial, commercial water users); and Honduras’ dependence on hydroelectric power for more than two thirds of total national power generation.

Supply issues are especially a problem in the outlying barrios surrounding Tegucigalpa, representing about 38% of the population. This poorer sector of population lives on steep hillsides where the piped water system cannot reach. These communities therefore receive water from SANAA water trucks that fill storage tanks that is then later sold at inflated prices.

=== Inefficient water use ===
The current water tariff system favors waste over conservation, and is structured to subsidize large water consumers, particularly middle-class and wealthy households. Problems with the tariff structure stem from an absence of household water meters. SANAA estimates that in a city of approximately 200,000 households, there are only 62,000 water meters, and of those, only 23,000 are functional.

Without water meters in many areas of the city, water fees are based upon fixed estimates of water usage. Because these estimates frequently underestimate the volume of water actually drawn, strong incentive exists for residents to disable or destroy existing water meters, and present a strong disincentive for households to invest in the installation of new meters. In addition, the lack of meters in the system means that SANAA has no way to clearly identify non-revenue water losses within the distribution system, either through leakages or illegal connections. It has been suggested that SANAA is only charging customers about 20% of the true cost of the water service it provides.

=== Urbanization and inappropriate land use ===
Urbanization threatens the quality of the city's surrounding watersheds and while the urbanization rate may slow, Tegucigalpa's population is expected to reach 2 million by 2029 thus doubling the 2008 population. Growth is expected in the west but this would encroach on a major watershed that supplies 30% of the city's water. In the south, development is also encroaching on the city's other major reservoir, La Concepcion. This expansion has resulted in an increase of deforestation within protected areas in the watersheds. This is a serious problem that is contributing to sedimentation of river channels and increasing the potential for flooding on the Choluteca River and its tributaries.

=== Pollution ===
More than 200 industries are located in different points throughout the city and typically they discharge industrial effluents into the sewer system or directly into nearby rivers. Much of the effluents are untreated and causing a worsening degradation of the water in the Laureles and Concepción reservoirs that provide water to the capital city.

Levels of contamination in the reservoirs are variable on seasonal basis; however, the discharge of industrial effluents is constant. Water quality from July–September is better as higher water levels are maintained. In the winter when the first rains arrive and increase domestic effluent runoff, treatment plants quickly reach capacity to treat water and levels of contamination increase. During the dry season from March until May, water levels become very low causing problems of foul odor and elevated concentrations of heavy metals such as iron. Rivers that run through Tegucigalpa also receive constant discharges of municipal waste and organic material from the surrounding mountains that have been deforested. Another major concern for SANAA is the lack of proper treatment of domestic sewage that finds its way into the rivers and storage reservoirs of Tegucigalpa.

=== Flooding ===
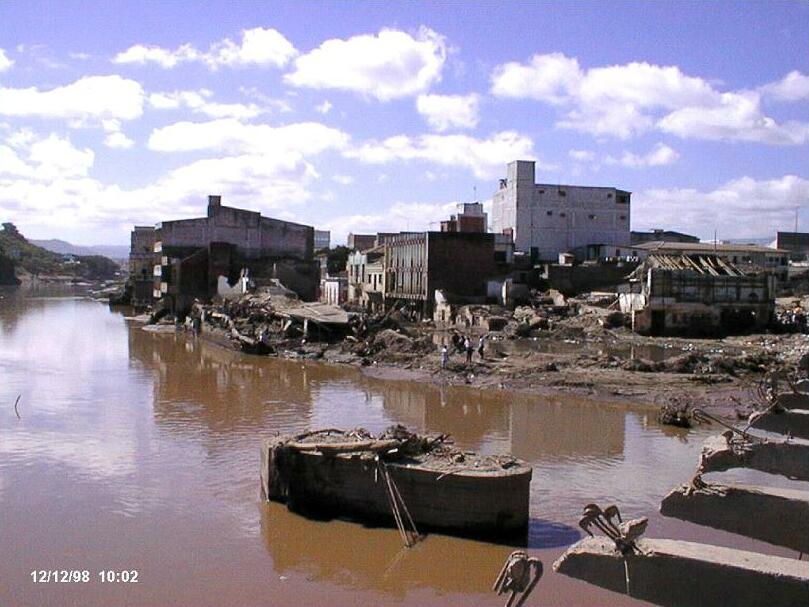
Flood damage in Tegucigalpa, 1998.

Geographically located in the mountains with peaks and ridges on all sides, Tegucigalpa is vulnerable to heavy rain storms that can quickly flood the streets throughout the city. This became clear in 1998 when Hurricane Mitch made landfall on Central America. Specifically in Tegucigalpa, Mitch left 180 people dead, 860 disappeared, 250,000 affected, 3,300 houses partially destroyed, and 14 of the 20 bridges that connect the city were destroyed. Exacerbating the problem, rapid and informal growth has taken place and has made many of Tegucigalpa's settlements highly vulnerable to environmental degradation and natural disasters.

== Institutional Framework ==
- Historically, the institutional framework has been fragmented and uncertain in Tegucigalpa. SANAA (Servicio Autonomo Nacional de Acueductos y Alcantarillados), the state-run water company, continues to own and manage Tegucigalpa's water and sewer systems, but is facing steep challenges from its growing institutional uncertainty and reduced investment budget due to the Water Framework Law (2003) that began a decentralization of management duties away from state actors in favor of municipalities. The new General Law on Water (August 2009) continues this process further reducing the role of SANAA. For now though, water resources management in Tegucigalpa remains the responsibility of SANAA. Duties include construction, operation, and management of water infrastructures and water service provision. SANAA is also responsible for the management and operation of the urban water supply and sanitation infrastructures and programs in Tegucigalpa.
- SERNA (La Secretaría de Recursos Naturales y Ambiente)- SERNA, the Ministry of Natural Resources and Environment is charged with responsibly utilizing water resources and sectoral management of water resources. SERNA oversees DGRH and CESCCO (both described below).

- The General Directorate of Water Resources (La Dirección General de Recursos Hídricos (DGRH)), a former unit of SERNA, was charged with the development, operation, and maintenance of irrigation systems. DGRH also mapped water use concessions and follows up on hydrological data.

- The Center for Contaminant Control (Centro de Estudios y Control de Contaminantes (CESCCO) studies water quality.

- AMDC (Alcaldía Municipal Distrito Central)- AMDC are the Tegucigalpa municipal service providers with the overall objective of improving the quality of life of the most impoverished. One aspect of their job is to accept responsibility for water management from SANAA; however, in spite of various efforts to transfer authority from the national to the municipal level, it has not yet taken place. SANAA and AMDC have faced complications in deciding how and when to carry out such a transfer.
- The newly created National Water Authority, (Autoridad Nacional de Agua) replaces the General Directorate of Water Resources and oversees separate institutions responsible for the administration of water resources, regulating their use, water distribution development, conservation, and maintenance. One objective of the new decentralized separation of institutions is to avoid administrative and sectoral conflicts between the institutions themselves.
- CONASA (Consejo Nacional de Agua Potable y Saneamiento)- CONASA is the national advisory council office of SANAA with responsibility for policy on potable water and sanitation. According to the 2003 Water Framework Law, sector policies are defined by CONASA. Onother major component of the CONASA mission is to create strategies and plans regarding coverage of water services.

== Legal Framework ==
- The Framework Law was passed in 2003 as an effort to better address the urban water management sector's challenges. The Framework Law mandated that service provision be transferred from the national utility, SANAA, to municipal service providers (AMDC) by 2008 but this has not taken place as mentioned earlier.
- The new General Law on Water was passed in August 2009. A major achievement of the General Law on Water is the new National Water Authority created to oversee the decentralization of water management roles from state institutions over to the municipalities. The municipality of Tegucigalpa is expected to assume full management responsibility for water and sanitation operations from SANAA. As this transfer occurs, the municipality will need considerable monetary and technical support to maintain operation of water and sewerage systems while improving deficiencies it will inherit.
- The National Technical Standard for the quality of drinking water: Decree No. 084 from 1993, sets the number and frequency of water samples as well as maximum parts per million of contaminants that will be permitted.
- The Technical Standard of wastewater discharges into nearby rivers, reservoirs and sewerage systems: health agreement No. 058 from 1997 sets the maximum allowed discharge of domestic and industrial pollutants into surface water supplies.
- The Draft Standard regulates the use of water, which seeks to establish minimum quality requirements required for a particular source (i.e. lake, river) of water according to its end-use.

Source: SANAA

While these legal standards are in place, adequate resources and capacity to maintain high quality water are not. Tegucigalpa continues to grow and increase pressure on the supplies and the ability of SANNA to treat wastewater. When coupled with inadequate sanitation and sewerage that discharge into supply rivers and storage reservoirs, the legal framework becomes unreliable in maintaining high water quality standards. This was a driving factor in the creation of the General Water Law of 2009 and subsequent National Water Authority.

== Integrated water management efforts ==
Policymaking, regulation, and service provision in water and sanitation are interconnected processes and enhance communication between sectors (including energy production, agriculture, industry, water supply and sanitation, urban planning, and environmental protection), and between different actors. In response to Tegucigalpa's challenges, two advances have originated from coalitions between government actors and civil society. One proved critical to the protection of one of the City's earlier water sources, the Picacho water treatment plant, which captures water from mountains within the temperate rainforest of La Tigra.

In 1980, the national government established the Parque Nacional La Tigra, Honduras’ first national park, to protect the area's rainforests and their hydrological potential. When the park became threatened by land development, a private foundation called AMITIGRA (Fundación Amigos de La Tigra) was created for its protection, and in 1993 the national congress passed a law formally delegating the park's management to the foundation. The AMITIGRA foundation designed a payment for environmental service scheme meant to finance activities aiming at conserving land use and water quality. Monies were raised through drinking water tariffs in Tegucigalpa.

Another development occurred in February–March 2010, as it became evident that Tegucigalpa was suffering from a significant drought attributable to the El Niño / La Niña phenomenon. A coalition of economic interests and concerned institutions was created under the name Frente Ciudadano del Agua para la Capital (Citizen's front for water in the Capital or FCAC). The Front included representatives from SANAA, the AMDC, the Chamber of Commerce, the Chamber of Construction and the College of Engineers, as well as members of the Civil Society such as local environmental NGOs.

The Front's initial efforts were focused on lobbying the government for the construction of a new dam, Guacerique 2. The FCAC broadened its scope to cover all water related challenges facing the city, and set up a structure of working groups focusing on a number of different issues, such as flooding and storm water management, watershed protection, urban planning and communication and social outreach. These efforts have been stymied by a lack of access to funding and the absence of an adequate institutional support structure.

=== Watershed protection ===
There is an effort to control growth in certain directions to preserve protected areas and watersheds. An important component of the growth strategy is the formulation of a long-term plan from the municipality, under the leadership of the Mayor. This plan is called the Plan Metropoli 2029.

=== Pollution control ===
Beginning in 1993, SANNA instituted a program to monitor the quality of water and maintain the standards set by the National Technical Standard. The goal was to deliver water at a specific quantity and quality adequate to the needs of the city. This has been difficult to achieve as urbanization rates have been high and municipal and industrial effluents have been a growing and constant challenge.

== See also ==
- Tegucigalpa
- Water Resources Management in Honduras
- Water supply and sanitation in Honduras

Regional:

- Water management in Greater Mexico City
- Water management in the Metropolitan Region of São Paulo
- Urban water management in Monterrey, Mexico
- Integrated urban water management in Aracaju, Brazil
- Integrated urban water management in Medellín, Colombia
- Urban water management in Bogotá, Colombia
- Integrated urban water management in Buenos Aires, Argentina
