= Integrated urban water management in Medellín =

Medellín
- City
- Municipio de Medellín
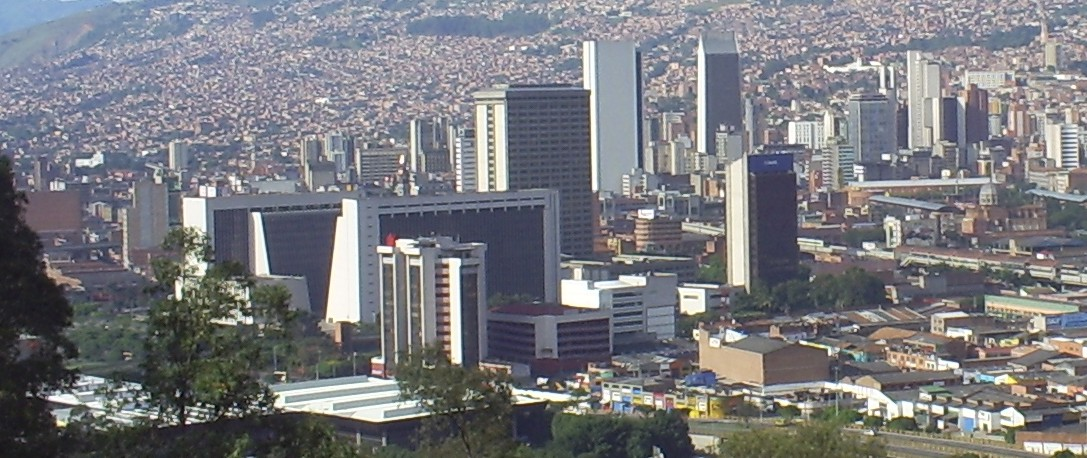
- Downtown Medellín

- Flag Seal

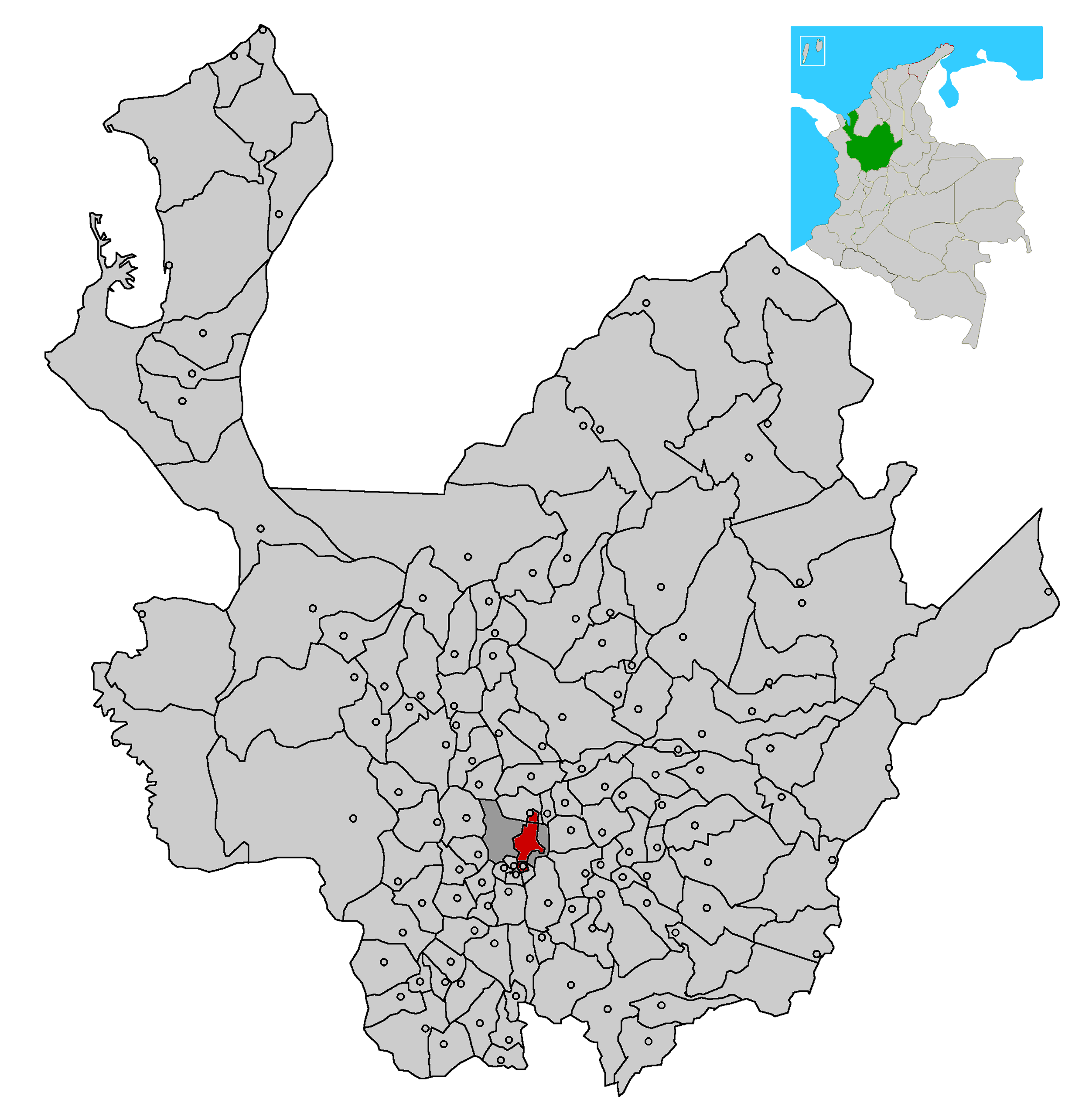
- Location of the city (urban in red) and municipality (dark gray) of Medellín in Antioquia Department.

- Location in Colombia
- Coordinates: 6°14′9.33″N 75°34′30.49″W
- Country: Colombia
- Department: Antioquia
- Founded: November 2, 1675

Area
  - City: 382 km^{2} (147 sq mi)
  - Metro: 1,152 km^{2} (445 sq mi)
- Elevation: 1,495 m (4,905 ft)

Population (2005)
  - City: 2,223,078 (ranked 2nd)
  - Density: 5,320.75/km^{2} (13,780.7/sq mi)
  - Metro: 3,312,165
- Time zone: UTC-5
- Human Development Index (2006): 0.808 – high
- Website: Government of Medellín official website

Integrated urban water management in Medellín, Colombia operates across the Aburrá Valley metropolitan area, serving a population of approximately 3.3 million. Water delivery and infrastructure maintenance in the region face geographical challenges, particularly regarding residential settlement on steep valley slopes vulnerable to landslides and stormwater erosion. Regional water management and utility services are primarily administered by Empresas Publica de Medellín (EPM), an autonomous public utility noted for institutional autonomy and technical capacity.

The metropolitan area of the Aburrá Valley is located near the equator but with a high elevation, the average climate is quite mild without great variation in temperature and rainfall. Consistent and adequate precipitation in the surrounding basins usually ensures that nearby water basins feeding the Aburrá Medellín River basin and subsequently the MAM can store approximately 178 BCM of water for the Metropolitan Area of the Aburrá Valley. Adequate supply and good resource management has allowed nearly 100% of MAM citizens across ten municipalities to receive piped water.

Substantial challenges remain however for Colombia's second largest urban and economical center in dealing with an increasing urbanization rate and the settling of inhabitants higher up the hillsides within the narrow valley. Drainage of stormwater is probably the most significant concern for the Metropolitan Area of the Aburrá Valley government and managing institutions. A stormwater management plan has been instituted to help address the adverse effects of urbanization, lack of infrastructures in poorer neighborhoods able to handle stormwater, river conservation and risk assessment.

== Key historical turning point for water management in Medellín ==
For many years leading up to the early 1990s, Medellín had been growing rapidly as large quantities of people moved into the Metropolitan Area of the Aburrá Valley in hopes of taking advantage of economic opportunities. With so little open space, those who urbanized did so very near or alongside the Medellín River. This led to an increase in municipal runoff. These domestic effluents compounded with growing industrial effluents, and upstream agriculture activity effectively increased toxic runoff into the Medellín River to the level that required immediate and drastic measures to recuperate the river. At the same time, Medellín was lacking in urban water management e.g. wastewater and stormwater, treatment, water quality, drainage, and institutional capacity had all been neglected to some degree. In order to confront the deteriorating sanitary and environmental conditions, as well as their adverse effects on resident's health and well-being, the Medellín River Sanitation Program was approved in the 1980s.

The river sanitation program included a set of projects, the first of which was estimated to cost US$232 million. An Inter-American Development Bank loan provided US$130 million, while local funds provided the remaining US$102 million. The overall goal for the first stage, which began in 1993 and concluded in 2000, was to clean up the Medellín River and its tributaries. The program included six more objectives as well: i) partial decontamination of the river and its tributaries; ii) partial treatment of 23% of the wastewater to be collected from the first of four wastewater treatment plants (WWTP) included within the master plan for the sewer system; iii) extension of the potable water networks and sewer system to all areas lacking these services to reach 100 percent coverage; iv) optimization of the water distribution system, management of consumption and reduction of unaccounted-for water losses from 38 percent in 1993 to 30 percent in 1999; v) preparation of phase two of the sanitation program; and vi) institutional strengthening of EPM’s management system for aqueducts and the sewer system.

By most of the initial criteria, the program was successful and propelled Medellín into becoming recognized as a strong example of urban water management. The physical results (i.e. new treatment plant, aqueducts, wastewater collectors, new conveyance pipes) were all very successful; the performance of EPM has been highly satisfactory. The only criteria that have not been as successful however, are the efficiency components. Investment costs and reductions in non-revenue water have yielded mixed results. Apart from fewer than expected negative results from the program, Medellín has become a successful example of good practice in urban water management.

== Economic and social ==
Medellín is located in the State of Antioquia and consists of two areas: the metropolitan area of the Aburrá Valley, which includes nine other communities and the city of Medellín. As of 2005, the area contributed 67% of the total GDP to the State of Antioquia, while Medellín alone contributed 55% to the state GDP of 14.7 billion. Colombia has a median value of 57 Gini coefficient indicating moderate income disparity. (source: WRI Earthtrends, 2003) The metropolitan area is primarily a peri-urban population living under not only "border" economic conditions where inhabitants enter and exit the formal economy of commerce on a regular basis but also under "border" social, legal, and institutional conditions. This interception of multiple geographical, economic and social stressors constitutes a major challenge to extending water services to these areas. That being said, a 2005 Report of the Economic Colombian Review of Proexport and the International Cooperation Agency of Medellín concluded that the Aburrá Valley, where Medellin is located, is the top economy in the state with a GDP of USD 7.8 billion in 2005. Medellín also contributes 8% to the GDP of Colombia. The primary products and drivers of the Medellín economy are steel, textiles, food and beverage, agriculture, public services, chemical products, pharmaceuticals, flowers, and refined oil.

The social landscape provides examples of how a city once considered the murder capital of the world (381 homicides per 100,000 people in 1991 down to 26 per 100,000 in 2006) has been able to rejuvenate the city into a much safer city for residents and burgeoning tourist destination. The city renewal plans were created and implemented by a former city mayor and a former director of urban projects with a philosophy of using design and architecture to address some of the city's problems.

== Geography and climate ==
Medellín is located in the Northwest region of Colombia near the equator with an elevation of 1,500 m (4,900 ft) and normally remains cooler than other cities with similar latitude due to its elevation. Because of Medellín's proximity to the equator, its temperature is constant year round, with minimal temperature variations. Average annual rainfall in the Aburrá-Medellín valley is from 1,400 to 2,800 mm (55 to 110 in) and has a tropical climate with average temperatures from 20C to 24C (68-75F). Because of the springlike climate all year, Medellín is known as 'La Ciudad de la Eterna Primavera' or 'City of the Eternal Spring'.

== Infrastructure ==
=== Water supply ===
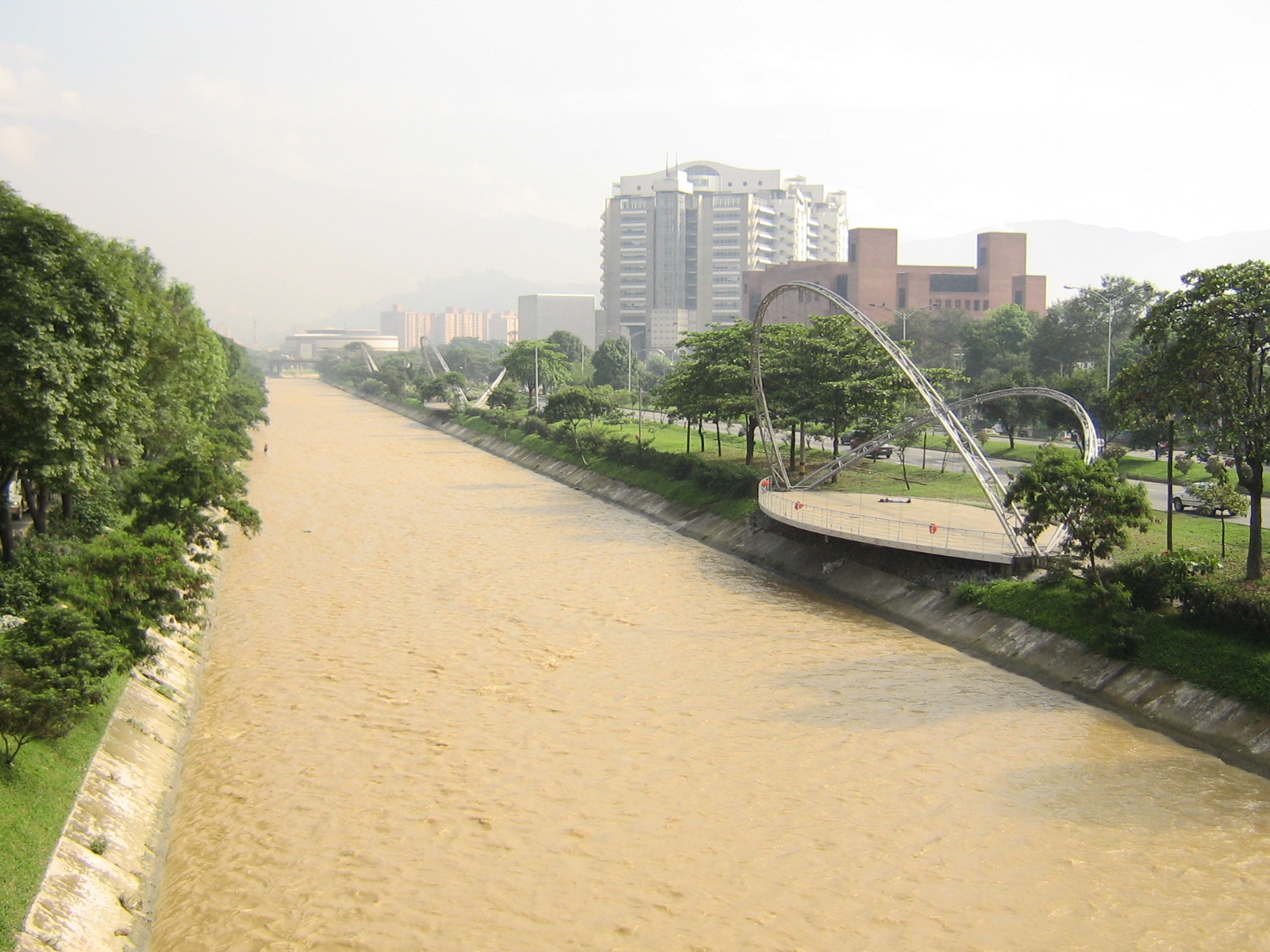
Medellín River

Aburrá-Medellin is the basin occupied by the Metropolitan Area of the Aburrá Valley. There are 10 cities in the metropolitan area covering 1,250 km^{2} while the metropolitan area itself covers 1,156 km^{2}. The Medellín River is 104 km long at elevations from 1,300 to 2,800 m (4,300 to 9,200 ft). Water resources that supply the Medellín River and subsequently the city of Medellín come from three particular sources: i) The Rio Grande basin and reservoir; ii) the Pantanillo (Reservoir La Fé) and; iii) La Mosca Creek from the reservoir Piedras Blancas. All together, these three sources amount to roughly 178 BCM in storage capacity. Mean annual flow in the basin varies from 30 to 40 L/(s.km2) or 1150 to 1300 mm of mean flow.

=== Water treatment and sanitation ===
EPM manages ten treatment plants across the Metropolitan Area of the Aburrá Valley. The Medellín River and Flowing Streams Sanitation Program, led by EPM, aims at the decontamination of the Medellín River and a reduction of the rivers biochemical oxygen demand. In support of this goal, EPM constructed the San Fernando water residue WWTP that treats an average of 1.8 m^{3}/s. Coming online in 2012, a second water residue treatment plant will treat 5 m^{3}/s. A "North Interceptor" tunnel will be built six feet under the Medellín River with a length of 8 km and will transport water to the future treatment plant in the municipality of Bello.

Sanitation coverage is nearly 100%. A portion representing 47% of the sanitation network is CSO (Combined Sewer Overflow). There are collectors in the tributaries and an interceptor along the Medellín River representing 9% of the network.

=== Stormwater and drainage ===
Urban drainage in Medellín is a substantial challenge. Drainage of stormwater includes a combination of creeks and culverts flowing from urbanized areas to the Medellín River. Flow velocity can be significant since the slopes surrounding Medellín are steep and long. Many eroded sediments are washed down and pose a hazard in the form of dangerous mud flows. These strormwater drainage concerns can be addressed by improving the drainage infrastructure and better protection of the hillsides.

Various institutions share management of stormwater and drainage. EPM focuses mostly on stormwater, whereas the Municipal Secretary focuses on the creeks and rivers in the sub-basins. At times, the EPM will assist the Municipal Secretary with various service provisions relating to drainage. The Medellín River is in the jurisdiction of "Areas Metropolitana" since it is the main river in Aburrá-Medellín Valley. A stormwater plan in concert with flood plain management developed by all the relevant institutions can help to address the overall basin with an integrated solution.

=== Aqueduct and recollection ===
The aqueduct network system has a total length of 3,472 km (2,157 mi) while the water recollection and transport system has a total length of 4,248 km (2,640 mi). Both are owned and operated by EPM (Empresas Publicas de Medellin).

=== Hydropower ===
There are 13 hydroelectric plants managed by EPM (Empresas Publicas de Medellin) with a generation capacity of 2,574 MW. The useful capacity of stored water in the EPM reservoirs is 1,606 million m^{3} or the equivalent to 3,468.2 GWh. This total represents 21.2% of the total capacity (16,340 GWh) in all storage reservoirs in Colombia. Some the noteworthy reservoirs are: Ríogrande II, Embrasures, Miraflores, Porce II, Quebradona, and the Peñol - Guatapé.

=== Water coverage and use ===
Water coverage is 100% representing 10 municipalities within the Aburrá-Medellín valley and 2.8 million citizens. The actual demand for water in the basin is 10 m^{3}/s with forecasted demand at 14 m^{3}/s. Availability should not be an issue as the regulated flow is 26 m^{3}/s and treatment capacity is 17.25 m^{3}/s. EPM values put demand as low as 6 m^{3}/s varying greatly from UNC estimates. Per capita water consumption is approximately 211 L/day.

== Water challenges ==
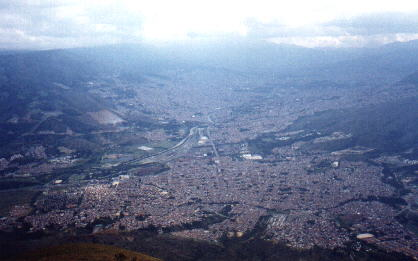
View of the Aburra Valley in the city of Medellín

=== Drainage ===
Urban drainage is a substantial challenge for Medellín for two reasons; first, the population of the MAM continues to grow as the urbanization rate increases; and second, its topography is conducive to fast and destructive run off. There are many ravines throughout the Aburrá-Medellín valley that act as natural drainage canals as they course through the city. Increasing urbanization results in greater land degradation and fewer permeable surfaces both of which precipitate growing drainage problems.

=== Urbanization ===
Population growth coupled with urbanization had turned the Medellín River into a dump site for millions of tons of municipal household waste. At the same time, the lack of open land led people to settle on the banks of the river and along its 200 tributaries. Untreated household wastewater accumulated in these streams and they became an open sewer, threatening residents’ health, the aesthetic conditions of the city, and the quality of life in the Aburrá-Medellín valley. Urbanization continues throughout the hills of the sub-basins supplying water to the Medellin River and is also developing in both downstream and upstream directions along the Medellin River. The population is forecast to be near 4.8 million by 2020.

=== Pollution ===
Negative impacts to water resources result from agriculture practices upstream from Medellín in the basin. Impacts include sedimentation and eutrophication of the reservoirs. To prevent these impacts, a program of water and soil conservation has been recommended by multilateral development agencies and uses economic mechanisms such as paying land owners upstream for sustainable land and water conservation practices. Overall wastewater discharges approached dangerous levels by the early 1990s and was compounded by the contaminated discharges from the city’s industrial sector. Heavy polluting industries include textile tanning facilities and steel manufacturing.

== Institutional framework ==
Integrated urban water management in Medellín has become an example of good practice where much of the success in managing water resources is due in great part to strong institutions, some of which are described below. While institutions have been efficient, services are fragmented. For example, EPM only address a portion of stormwater management in the MAM; other institutions handle what remains. In Medellín, Empresas Varias de Medellin manages solid waste; however, other institutions in the metro area carry out this responsibility as well and do so without satisfactory collaboration between institutions. A new institutional framework can address some of these shortcomings by incorporating all levels of service and investment and by integrating urban water management services into one institution. Alternatively, best practices can be developed and shared among institutions in order to integrate all of the services.

Empresas Publicas de Medellín is an integrated state owned utilities provider (water, electricity, gas, and telecommunications) that is property of the Municipality of Medellín. EPM's water resource services include providing water, sanitation, a portion of stormwater, distributing potable water, and transport and treatment of wastewater. EPM is a public-sector entity that works like a private company and performance is measured by efficiency indicators that are comparable to other successful international water operators. EPM’s development and management policies are based on sustainability and efficiency. EPM's main market is the metropolitan area of Medellin and the Department of Antioquia, comprising 5.2 million people. It is the second largest water and sanitation utility in Colombia and its transferred profits to the municipality currently represent ~1/3 of the latter annual budget. EPM management and directors are independent of any political influence. In addition, EPM’s corporate governance model made of formal and informal mechanisms and its Corporate Social Responsibility Policy have become important drivers for the growth and sustainability of the company.

Empresas Varias de Medellín is a municipal company which develops the solid waste services. ESP has two fundamental pillars: 1) The strengthening of the local recycling networks; and 2) informal education that addresses how/whom is generating waste.

Areas Metropolitana develops and licenses environment and water resource management of Metropolitan Area of Medellin.

== Legal framework ==
Municipalities in the Metropolitan Area of Medellín

The Water Taxation Law 99 of 1993 emphasized the use of economic instruments to induce water users to comply with environmental laws and ensure that water used for industrial purposes would reusable. The aim was to also influence industrial users to adopt clean technologies for the production of goods. Environmental authorities that guarantee the renewability of water make use of this compensatory tax to cover expenses related to carrying out their responsibility.

(excerpt below drawn from: Irrigation in Colombia)

The Colombian Constitution of 1991 states that the National government shall be responsible for the sustainable use of natural resources, including water resources. Land Development Law No. 41 in 1993 included decrees Nos. 1278 and 2135 with the aim of growing private investment in the irrigation sector while reducing public intervention. The Law incorporates users’ participation in design, building, and posterior operation and maintenance (O&M) by establishing a water fee which includes a fraction of the total costs.

== Response to challenges ==
=== Water Management Plan ===
There is a water management plan of the Aburrá-Medellín river basin that is being implemented by the Medellín government's office of Metropolitan development in the Aburrá-Medellín valley (Area Metropolitana del Valle de Aburrá). The plan is composed of the following items: i) design and construction of sewerage in the Girardota municipality; ii) design and construction of sanitation interceptors for the Medellín River in the Caldes municipality; iii) cleanup of small tributaries in the Aburra-Medellín valley through proper handling of domestic wastewater using unconventional systems in areas where collection is difficult; iv) implementation of channel stabilization; v) cleaning water channels and improving water quality in the Aburra-Medellín valley; and vi) improvement of hydropower capacity on the river by removing sediment in reservoirs.

=== EPM Strategies ===
In the pursuit of its goals as public services provider, and in response to the challenges faced in its service area, EPM has designed the following strategies to increase access to water and sanitation services, prevent services disconnection and to improve the quality of life of its customers:

- Network Connection Financing Program is an EPM initiative designed to provide access to water services to low-income households in peri-urban areas of the Aburrá Valley. The program offers long-term credit at low rates to people who have no access to credit.
- Financing and Re-financing Consumption is meant to help households with low capacity to pay for water, sanitation and energy bills, to have access to low cost financing with minimum guarantees to prevent delinquent accounts and service disconnection.
- Prepaid Program targets customers with delinquent accounts or that are at risk of having an illegal connection. The program allows reconnection of services (which are prepaid) and debt payment over 120 months charged at the DTF (Depósitos Termino Fijo) interest rate.
- Social Financing Program / Grupo EPM card offers households in the Antioquia Region credit at competitive rates that vary according to the type of product or activity financed.
- Community Organization Contracts has the objective of contracting community-based organizations and associations located in Aburrá Valley areas where EPM has projects on network expansion, operation and maintenance in water and sanitation services provision.
- Water services provision peri-urban areas is implemented by EPM in conjunction with the Municipality of Medellín and seeks to legalize and allow access to public water services for people in peri-urban areas in Medellín. The aim is to reduce risks derived from illegal or irregular use of public services and protect private and public goods.
- Minimum Potable Water Consumption Amount for Life. The World Health Organization estimates that the average quantity of potable water needed per person to meet basic human needs is 2.5m3 per month. Minimum Potable Water Consumption Amount for Life is a Municipality of Medellin initiative launched in 2009 providing subsidies paid by the municipality to cover the cost of 2.5m3 /month per person.
- National demand-side and supply-side subsidies is a scheme offering users with low payment capacity subsidies financed by overages in the bills of users with the best payment capacity, industrial and commercial users, and with municipality funds.

=== Multi-lateral assistance ===
The Inter-American Development Bank has been working periodically with Medellín on the Medellín River Sanitation Program since the program was approved in the 1980s. In the most recent phase, the bank approved a 25-year loan to Colombia in February 2009 for US$450 million for a cleanup project of the Medellín River. This is the largest loan the bank has ever issued for a river cleanup and will be used to build a treatment plant in the northern end of the Aburrá-Medellín valley. The new plant will open for operation in 2012 and will increase Medellín’s wastewater treatment capacity to 95%. In a prior phase, a loan of US$130 million was used to build the San Fernando wastewater treatment plant in the southern end of the Aburrá-Medellín valley.

=== Recommended measures ===
- A stormwater management plan has been recommended by consultants from development institutions working closely with institutions and government offices of Medellín. The recommended plan would addresses populations without proper sanitation, the high frequency of floods and related impacts due to urbanization, amenities in poor neighborhoods, and improvement of river conservation. In a second step of the stormwater management plan, assessment of risk would be accounted for.
- Ongoing institutional reform on urban water management with the following overall objectives: i) implementing the stormwater institutional framework at all levels of service provision and investment; and ii) integrating urban service provision into one institution.

== See also ==
- Water resources management in Colombia
- Irrigation in Colombia
- Water management in Greater Mexico City
- Water management in the Metropolitan Region of São Paulo
- Urban water management in Bogotá, Colombia
- Integrated urban water management in Buenos Aires, Argentina
- Water management in greater Tegucigalpa
- Integrated urban water management in Aracaju, Brazil
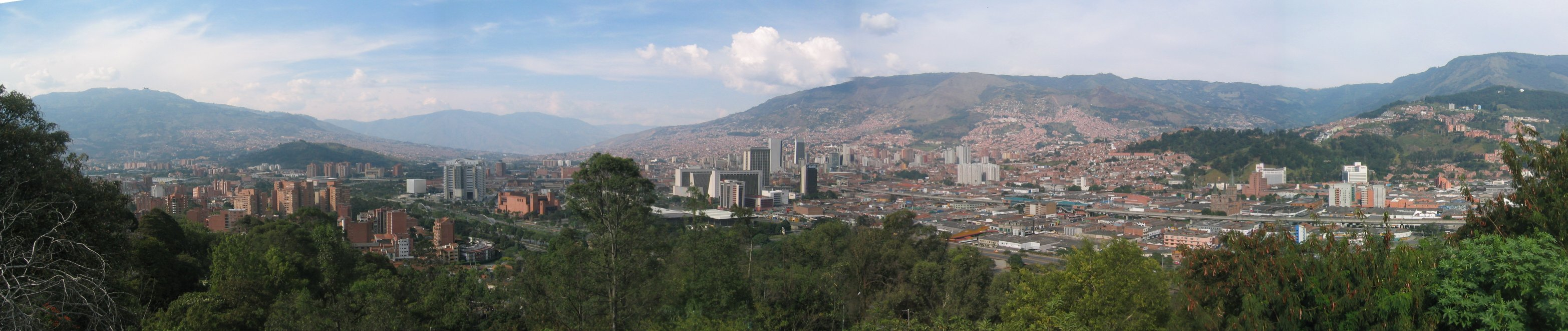
Panorama
