= List of Colombian municipalities by population =

The table below lists the largest municipalities (Municipios) in Colombia by population, using data from the most recent population estimates of Colombia in 2020.

State capital
State's largest city
State capital and largest city
Capital district

Rank	Municipality	Department	Population in 2020
1	Bogotá	Capital District	7,732,161
2	Medellín	Antioquia	2,519,592
3	Cali	Valle del Cauca	2,264,427
4	Barranquilla	Atlántico	1,275,264
5	Cartagena	Bolívar	1,017,616
6	Cúcuta	Norte de Santander	770,173
7	Soacha	Cundinamarca	715,252
8	Soledad	Atlántico	646,678
9	Bucaramanga	Santander	600,098
10	Ibagué	Tolima	536,439
11	Bello	Antioquia	544,549
12	Villavicencio	Meta	553,409
13	Santa Marta	Magdalena	530,107
14	Valledupar	Cesar	526,238
15	Montería	Córdoba	507,463
16	Pereira	Risaralda	477,068
17	Manizales	Caldas	445,669
18	Pasto	Nariño	402,073
19	Neiva	Huila	367,781
20	Palmira	Valle del Cauca	355,712
21	Popayán	Cauca	328,217
22	Buenaventura	Valle del Cauca	317,881
23	Floridablanca	Santander	317,541
24	Armenia	Quindío	302,613
25	Sincelejo	Sucre	295,047
26	Itagüí	Antioquia	287,981
27	Tumaco	Nariño	260,054
28	Envigado	Antioquia	238,656
29	Tuluá	Valle del Cauca	224,706
30	Dosquebradas	Risaralda	222,717
31	Barrancabermeja	Santander	209,598
32	Riohacha	La Guajira	206,087
33	Piedecuesta	Santander	182,403
34	Yopal	Casanare	180,151
35	Tunja	Boyacá	179,205
36	Uribia	La Guajira	179,188
37	Florencia	Caquetá	173,293
38	Jamundí	Valle del Cauca	173,053
39	San Juan de Girón	Santander	168,571
40	Facatativá	Cundinamarca	151,461
41	Fusagasugá	Cundinamarca	150,211
42	Chía	Cundinamarca	143,844
43	Zipaquirá	Cundinamarca	141,555
44	Rionegro	Antioquia	141,173
45	Cartago	Valle del Cauca	140,323
46	Magangué	Bolívar	139,816
47	Mosquera	Cundinamarca	139,602
48	Malambo	Atlántico	136,790
49	Quibdó	Chocó	134,959
50	Sogamoso	Boyacá	131,860
51	Buga	Valle del Cauca	131,232
52	Turbo	Antioquia	129,443
53	Pitalito	Huila	129,079
54	Ocaña	Norte de Santander	128,130
55	Duitama	Boyacá	127,123
56	Ciénaga	Magdalena	126,370
57	Apartadó	Antioquia	126,239
58	Madrid	Cundinamarca	122,378
59	Ipiales	Nariño	118,519
60	Aguachica	Cesar	118,392
61	Lorica	Córdoba	115,491
62	Santander de Quilichao	Cauca	113,384
63	Sahagún	Córdoba	111,416
64	Turbaco	Bolívar	110,631
65	Villa del Rosario	Norte de Santander	110,190
66	Cereté	Córdoba	109,563
67	Girardot	Cundinamarca	108,880
68	Yumbo	Valle del Cauca	108,454
69	Funza	Cundinamarca	101,420

== Distribution ==
Nº	Department	Number of cities over 100,000 inhabitants
1	Cundinamarca	9
2	Valle del Cauca	8
3	Antioquia	6
4	Santander	4
5	Córdoba	4
6	Atlántico	3
7	Bolívar	3
8	Boyacá	3
9	Nariño	3
10	Norte de Santander	3
11	Cauca	2
12	Cesar	2
13	Huila	2
14	La Guajira	2
15	Magdalena	2
16	Risaralda	2
17	Caldas	1
18	Caquetá	1
19	Casanare	1
20	Chocó	1
21	Distrito Capital	1
22	Meta	1
23	Quindío	1
24	Sucre	1
25	Tolima	1
