= Urban water management in Bogotá =

Bogotá
- City
- Bogotá
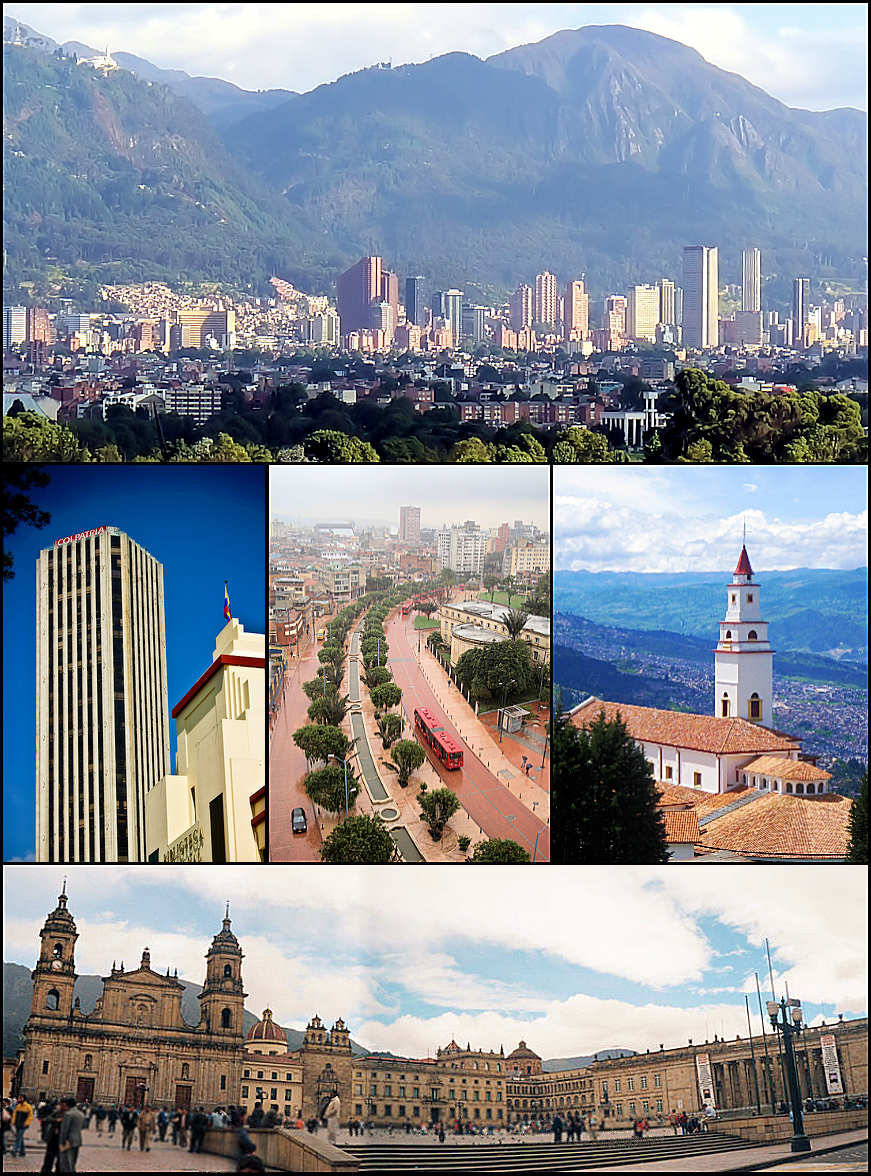

- Flag Seal
- Motto: Bogotá, 2600 metros más cerca de las estrellas Bogotá, 2600 meters closer to the stars
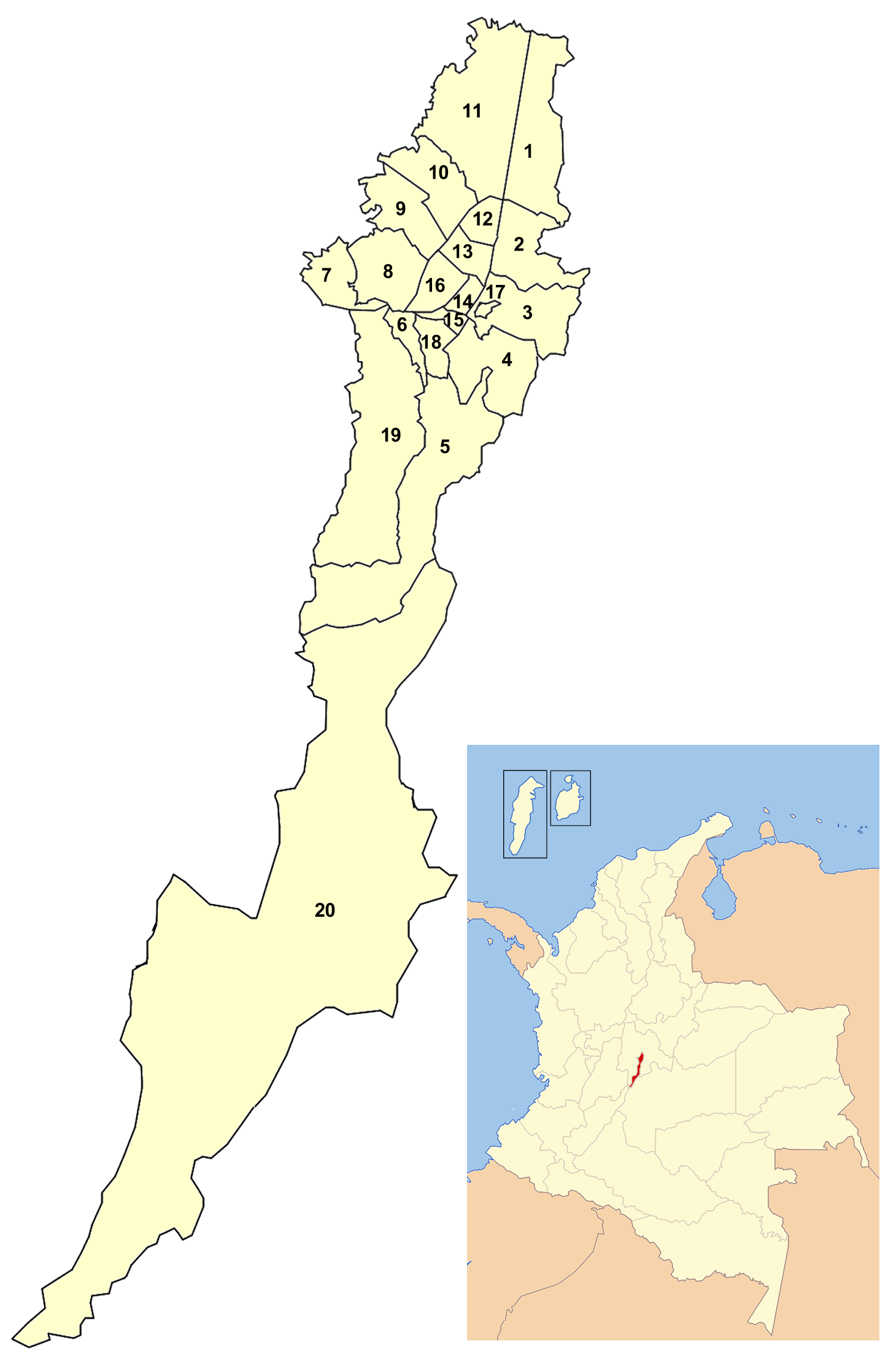
- Localities (localidades) of Bogotá
- Coordinates: 4°35′53″N 74°4′33″W
- Country: Colombia
- Department: Cundinamarca
- Foundation: August 6, 1538
- Founder: Gonzalo Jiménez de Quesada
- Elevation: 2,640 m (8,660 ft)

Population (2009 census)
  - City: 7.304.384 Ranked 1st
  - Density: 11,071/km^{2} (28,670/sq mi)
  - Metro: 8,566,926
- Time zone: UTC-5
- HDI (2006): 0.880 – high
- Website: City Official Site; Mayor Official Site; Bogotá Tourism

Urban water management in Bogotá, a metropolitan area of more than 8 million inhabitants, faces three main challenges: improving the quality of the highly polluted Bogotá River, controlling floods and revitalizing riparian areas along the river. The main public entities in charge of water resources management in Bogotá are the district government, the regional environmental agency Corporación Autónoma Regional (CAR) of the department of Cundinamarca, and the water and sanitation utility Empresa de Acueducto y Alcantarillado de Bogotá (EAAB). A court mandated that these entities cooperate to improve the river's quality, a ruling that translated into an agreement signed in 2007 that defined the responsibilities of each entity and forced them to approach the water management challenges in an integrated way. The agreement prepared the ground for the expansion of the Salitre wastewater treatment plant, construction of a new one, widening and protecting of riparian zones, restoring the natural meander of the river, and hydraulically connecting the river to its flood plains. These measures are supported by the World Bank and the Inter-American Development Bank.

== Geography and climate ==
Bogotá is located on a high plateau, called Bogotá savanna, in the Eastern Ranges of the Andes at an elevation of 2,640 metres (8,660 ft) above sea level. The extended region is known as the Altiplano Cundiboyacense, meaning "high plateau of Cundinamarca and Boyacá". The Bogotá River crosses the savanna and forms the Tequendama Falls (Salto del Tequendama) to the southwest. Tributary rivers form valleys where villages lie and whose economy is based on agriculture, livestock, and artisan production. The savanna is bordered to the east by the Eastern Hills that run north-south and contain the Guadalupe and Monserrate hills. The western city limit is formed by the Bogotá River. Going north, the Metropolitan Area of Bogotá extends over the plateau up to the towns of Chía and Sopó.

Bogota has a subtropical highland climate and the average temperature on the Bogotá savanna is 14.0 °C (57.2 °F), varying from 3 to 25 °C (37 to 77 °F). Dry and rainy seasons alternate throughout the year. The driest months are December–March with 2 to 5 centimetres (0.79 to 1.97 in) per month of precipitation; the rainiest months are April and May with approximately 7 centimetres (2.8 in) monthly totals, and September - November (5 to 9 centimetres (2.0 to 3.5 in) per month). June and July are usually rainy periods and August is sunny with high winds. Hailstorms are common during the rainy season, and can be very strong, especially in October. Throughout the year, the days are mild and cool while nights can get moderately cold due to calm winds blowing in the evening.

== History ==
During a period of approximately thirty years from the early 1970s through the 1990s Bogotá's water management focused heavily on improving coverage and quality of water supply sanitation services (WSS) while also improving financial and technical sustainability. As a result, the water and sewage company of Bogotá (EAAB) provides above 99 percent coverage for water, sewage and drainage services, and has transformed itself from an inefficient bankrupt company into a commercial water utility with a corporate culture based on professional responsibility and accountability.

While WSS improvements were ongoing, the traditional water management approach did not account for domestic and industrial wastewater treatment and non-point sources pollution control resulting in the environmental degradation of water bodies. These systems were viewed as separate and the management strategy did not account for treatment facilities, local streams, and overall water quality within them. The philosophy is evolving however, and water resources management practice is becoming more of an integrated approach taking into account a multi-sectoral approach looking at water supply, wastewater treatment plant (WWTP), drainage and irrigation as one entity. According to pollution control work presented by a team of researchers at the British Hydrological Society symposium in 2008, there is a need to consider the sewer system, the WWTP, and the river as one system. These developments in the Bogotá water management system offer multiple opportunities to incorporate integrated methodologies both now and in the future.

== Historical legal background ==
In the 1970s, wastewater was becoming an increasing problem. All of the city's untreated wastewater were being discharged into the Bogotá river and ultimately the reservoir behind the Muña dam. The community of Muña brought a lawsuit against EAAB, CAR, EMGESA, and the district government for negligence. The Tribunal of the Department of Cundinamarca ultimately decided for the community of Muña and further required the parties to create a review process and action plan to address the grievances brought forth by Muña. The Tribunal reserved the right to force a decision by the defendants if they did not make suitable progress on the mandate. The defendants appealed and the process went under review again. Upon further review, a judge ruled again in favor of Muña and delegated shared responsibilities to CAR, EAAB, and the District. The defendants agreed to the terms set by the court ruling and the prevailing legal document was called Convenio 171 and was signed by all parties in 2007. Convenio 171 calls for CAR to finance and construct the upgrade and expansion of the Salitre WWTP. CAR did this by creating a special account for the Bogotá wastewater program called Fondos Para Inversiones Ambientales en Bogotá (FIAB) (Funds for environmental investment in Bogotá). EAAB agreed to construct the new interceptors to the forthcoming Canoas WWTP.

== Multi-stakeholder assistance ==
The World Bank is working with CAR, EAAB, and the Government District to help refine the Sanitation Plan (Plan de Saneamiento) and establish the basis for a long-term program to improve the water ecosystem in the basin. Project cost is US$487 million and the objectives are to transform 68-km of Bogota River into an environmental asset for the Bogota metropolitan region by improving water quality, reducing flood risk, restoring riparian habitats, and creating multifunctional areas along the river that provide an ecological habitat, as well as opportunities for the public use and enjoyment of this urban river.

Additionally, the World Bank is offering assistance with an integrated urban water management strategy. The goal is to enable Bogotá to move towards a sustainable approach to improving the Bogotá river and creating an urban environmental asset. Objectives include a model project for urban river recuperation that incorporates water quality improvements, flood control, wetlands, and multifunctional parks.

The Inter-American Development Bank (IDB) is planning a US$50 million loan to support CAR in its Bogotá River cleanup efforts. The IDB also contributed a US$1.5 million grant to CAR's environmental control program. An additional US$643,000 was put up by CAR itself. The projects for the basin's protection are to be carried out in multiple stages, the first of which implements an institutional, managerial, financial and operational framework to carry out the cleanup project. With the loan, CAR plans on building aqueducts and increasing potable water supply, drainage systems and wastewater treatment for all 41 municipalities located in the Bogotá river basin. The money may also finance the design, construction and operation of wastewater treatment plants for municipalities that do have them.

== Water supply and use ==
=== Surface water ===
Water supply in the Bogotá metro area involves a system of watersheds that collect, store, and deliver water to the Bogotá River Basin. Watersheds upstream include Tibitoc with a total storage capacity of 887 Mn^{3}, Chingaza with total storage capacity at 325 Mn^{3}, and Tunjuelo with total storage capacity at 10.4 Mn^{3}. Chingaza, which is Bogotá's primary source for drinking water receives its water from another watershed belonging to the inhabitants of the eastern Colombian plains. Waters from the eastern catchment are transferred to Chinzaga and then finally reach the Rio Bogotá as wastewater after passing through the Bogotá water system. Within these other water basins, there are approximately nine storage reservoirs that supply water by way of tunnel, aqueduct, or tributary to the main water system of Bogotá. Primary storage reservoirs include Chuza, Sisga, Tominé, and the Neusa.

The Bogotá River starts at an elevation of 3,300 metres (10,800 ft) and flows 370 kilometres (230 mi) before discharging into the Magdalena River at an elevation of 280 meters. The Basin covers 6,000 square kilometres (2,300 sq mi) and is divided into three parts: i) upper basin north of Bogotá; ii) middle basin in the Bogotá metropolitan area; and iii) lower basin downstream of Bogotá. While the Bogotá River passes through the middle basin and the Bogotá metro area, three sub-basins, the Salitre, Fucha, and Tunjuelo discharge their tributaries into the Bogotá River before entering the lower basin. The average flow before entering the city is 10 m^{3}/s, and the sub-basins surrounding Bogotá discharge an additional 22 m^{3}/s of wastewater.

=== Groundwater ===
While most of the water supply for Bogotá is supplied by rivers, there does exist groundwater that could become a considerable portion of the Bogotá water portfolio. Currently, groundwater is primarily used for the irrigation of flowers. Approximately 26,000,000,000 cubic metres (9.2×10^{11} cu ft) (BCM) is contained in the Guadalupe aquifer representing about 30 times the amount of water stored in all the reservoirs of the city. In the past, wells have been drilled in some areas and aquifer levels have descended causing the collapse of housing developments, roads, and some of the wells themselves.

Bogotá River

Location
- Country: Colombian department of Cundinamarca

Physical characteristics
- Source
  - location: Páramo de Guacheneque, Villapinzón
  - coordinates: 5°15′N 73°40′W
  - elevation: 3,300 m (10,800 ft)
- Mouth
  - location: Magdalena River at Girardot
  - coordinates: 4°17′14″N 74°47′43″W
- Length: 375 km (233 mi)
- Basin size: 6,000 km^{2} (2,300 sq mi)
- Discharge
  - average: 31–41 m^{3}/s (1,100–1,400 cu ft/s)

=== Water use ===
The population of Bogotá consumes 100 to 200 litres per day (0.25 to 0.51 imp gal/ks) per capita which is generally accepted to be an adequate amount for drinking, bathing, sanitation, and cooking. EAAB estimates per capita usage of around 130 litres per day (0.33 imp gal/ks). In Latin America, the average water use was estimated in 2005 at about 240 litres per day (0.61 imp gal/ks) per capita. Total consumption was about 17 cubic metres per second (600 cu ft/s), of which 85% (or 14.5 cubic metres per second (510 cu ft/s)) was returned to the Bogotá River downstream. The other municipalities in the basin used about 1 cubic metre per second (35 cu ft/s), for a total of 18 cubic metres per second (640 cu ft/s) for the whole basin. This amount increased to 23–25 m^{3}/s by year 2000 and was expected to reach 27 to 32 cubic metres per second (950 to 1,130 cu ft/s) by 2010. There currently remains approximately 700,000 people in the metropolitan area and 75,000 in other nearby municipalities that are without water services.

== Infrastructure ==
=== Drainage ===
The Bogotá drainage system consists of three main sub-catchments: the Salitre, Fucha and Tunjuelo Rivers. Each one flows from east to west. The drainage system is a combination of a combined and separated system. The first drainage system developments (before 1965) were constructed in the central part of Salitre sub-catchment and the eastern part of Fucha sub-catchment and they consist of a combined system with an approximate length of 74 square kilometres (29 sq mi) while newer ones (since 1965) consist of separated systems.

=== Wastewater and treatment ===
The original wastewater master plan for Bogotá was conceived in the late 1980s, and called for the construction of one 22 cubic metres per second (780 cu ft/s) wastewater treatment plant downstream of the city. In the early 1990s, however, the municipal government changed course and decided to pursue 3 medium-sized wastewater treatment plants, one for each of the three sub-catchments (introduced in the previous section) in Bogotá. In 1994, the city entered into a build-operate-transfer (BOT) concession contract with a French consortium for a 4 m^{3}/s primary WWTP called Salitre, which is located in the northern part of Bogotá. The plant started operations in 2000, and in December 2003 the district canceled the contract, purchased the plant from the consortium, and turned over its operation to EAAB. The existing Salitre WWTP does not provide adequate treatment, therefore an expansion and upgrade to a secondary WWTP is underway and will serve the northern population in Bogota City.

The Tibitoc water production plant, located in the suburbs of Bogota, supplies almost 30% of Bogota's residents. To ensure continuous water supply, a rehabilitation project of the water plant and water mains was carried out. This is a 20-year project that began in 1998. An investment of US$22 million over three years was made by Veolia Water Solutions & Technologies to rehabilitate the entire water treatment process including physical pretreatment, coagulation, flocculation, sand filtration, neutralization and disinfection. Additionally, there was an investment of US$35 million to rehabilitate the Tibitoc water production plant water main lines. Other improvements were made to operating guidelines and the monitoring of the facility.

=== Irrigation ===
Because of the relatively high levels of precipitation, little water is needed for irrigation by farms in the Bogotá region. About 6 to 7 cubic metres per second (210 to 250 cu ft/s) in total is used for irrigation. The watering of flowers in many Bogotá greenhouses is one of the most important agricultural and economic activities making Colombia one of the largest exporters of flowers in the world. This high-value export business has created a sustainable use for water.

La Ramada Irrigation District is a component of an irrigation and wetland management program on the upper Bogotá River. Within the program, La Ramada irrigation district will be expanded from 5,550 to 18,535 hectares (13,710 to 45,800 acres). La Ramada is bordered to the west by the Tenjo watershed, by the Chicú River to the north and by the Bogotá River on the eastern and southern borders. There are about 800 farmers who ensure irrigation to the land within the borders of their irrigation district, within management schemes, and along a set of water resources management criteria.

=== Hydroelectric power ===
A complex hydroelectric system has been built, taking advantage of natural water falls or channeling and piping water to steep slopes to produce hydroelectric power. About 670 MW are now generated in the Bogotá region alone. An additional 600 MW are expected to be produced by the Chingaza project. The Bogotá power company (EMGESA) has constructed a hydropower facility (1124 MW installed capacity) downstream of Bogotá to take advantage of the river flow and elevation drop. The holding reservoir for the EMGESA power complex is the 853 ha Muña reservoir, which is also highly contaminated.

== Economic and social ==
Bogotá is the largest city and economic center in Colombia. With a gross domestic product (GDP) of US$86 billion, Bogotá accounts for approximately 25% of Colombia's overall national GDP. Per capita average income is US$10,000 making it the fifth highest in South America. At this level of income, Bogotá is one of Latin America's most important metropolitan areas. In general, companies locate their headquarters in Bogotá because of its size, resources, and because the national stock exchange is in Bogotá. Bogotá is also a major center for the import and export businesses of the Andes community in Latin America. Important industries include financial services and banking. The headquarters of multinational commercial banks as well as the Banco de la República, Colombia's central bank, are located in Bogotá. Bogotá is a center for printing and publishing, the national telecommunications network, the largest industrial facilities in the country. Bogotá also houses the central governmental institutions and military headquarters, which represent another major component of the city's economy. And finally, a large and flourishing flower export trade is located in Bogotá.

Employment trends in Bogotá indicate that rates of unemployment have fallen while a growing number of citizens are looking for work. This paradox can largely be explained by ongoing urbanization into Bogotá, therefore poverty remains a substantial problem. Jobs have been created in some sectors, and women are gaining more opportunities for employment, but more progress is needed. Overall, poverty since 1970 has decreased; however, data collected and presented in 2006 by UN-HABITAT at the World Urban Forum in Vancouver, Canada reveal that 50% of the population still live in poverty and many of those live in slums. A separate UN-HABITAT report from 2003 describes three types of slums in Bogotá: inner-city, those lying on the perimeter, and squatter settlements. The total number of those living under these conditions is around 700,000. Additional data by UN-HABITAT shows that wealth is very unevenly distributed and that pockets of poverty exist in Bogotá that are poorer than the poorest regions of the country as a whole.

=== Wastewater pollution and response ===
The Salitre WWTP has been in operation for ten years, however, the city of Bogotá has not seen an improvement in water quality because 80% of the city's wastewater continues to flow untreated into the river. In December 2004, the Department of Planning (Departamento Nacional de Planeación, DNP) issued a strategic planning document for the Bogotá River calling for an upgrade and expansion of the Salitre WWTP to a capacity of 8 cubic metres per second (280 cu ft/s) to address a portion of the remaining 80% of untreated wastewater. The plan also calls for the construction of a larger primary plant with a 14 cubic metres per second (490 cu ft/s) treatment capacity to be located downstream of Bogotá. This larger WWTP called Canoas will treat wastewater from the Fucha, Tunjuelo and Soacha basins.

These planned expansions to the wastewater treatment capacity are meant to address one of the biggest environmental problems facing Bogotá and that is untreated wastewater entering the Bogota River as it flows through the middle basin. In this section, Bogotá City discharges all of its wastewater into the river through three main urban tributaries: Salitre, Fucha, and Tunjuelo Rivers. This occurs primarily by way of illegal connections to storm drains, solid waste from a growing urban population, and industries along the aforementioned urban tributaries. During the dry season, wastewater flow is about 17 m^{3}/s while the capacity of the primary wastewater treatment plant at Salitre is only 4 cubic metres per second (140 cu ft/s). As a consequence, the Bogotá river is one of the most polluted rivers in the world and includes an anaerobic stretch of about 60 km. with zero dissolved oxygen and high levels of BOD5, Total suspended solids (TSS) and fecal coliforms. In the lower basin of the city, more untreated wastewater is flushed into the Bogotá River just a few kilometers upstream of the Tequendama Falls before it is then transferred to the Muña Reservoir for hydroelectric generation. Consequently, Tequendama falls rarely has any significant flow. EAAB is financing a project to include the construction of new interceptors on the Salitre and Fucha rivers to transport wastewater to a new WWTP with capacity of 8 m^{3}/s.

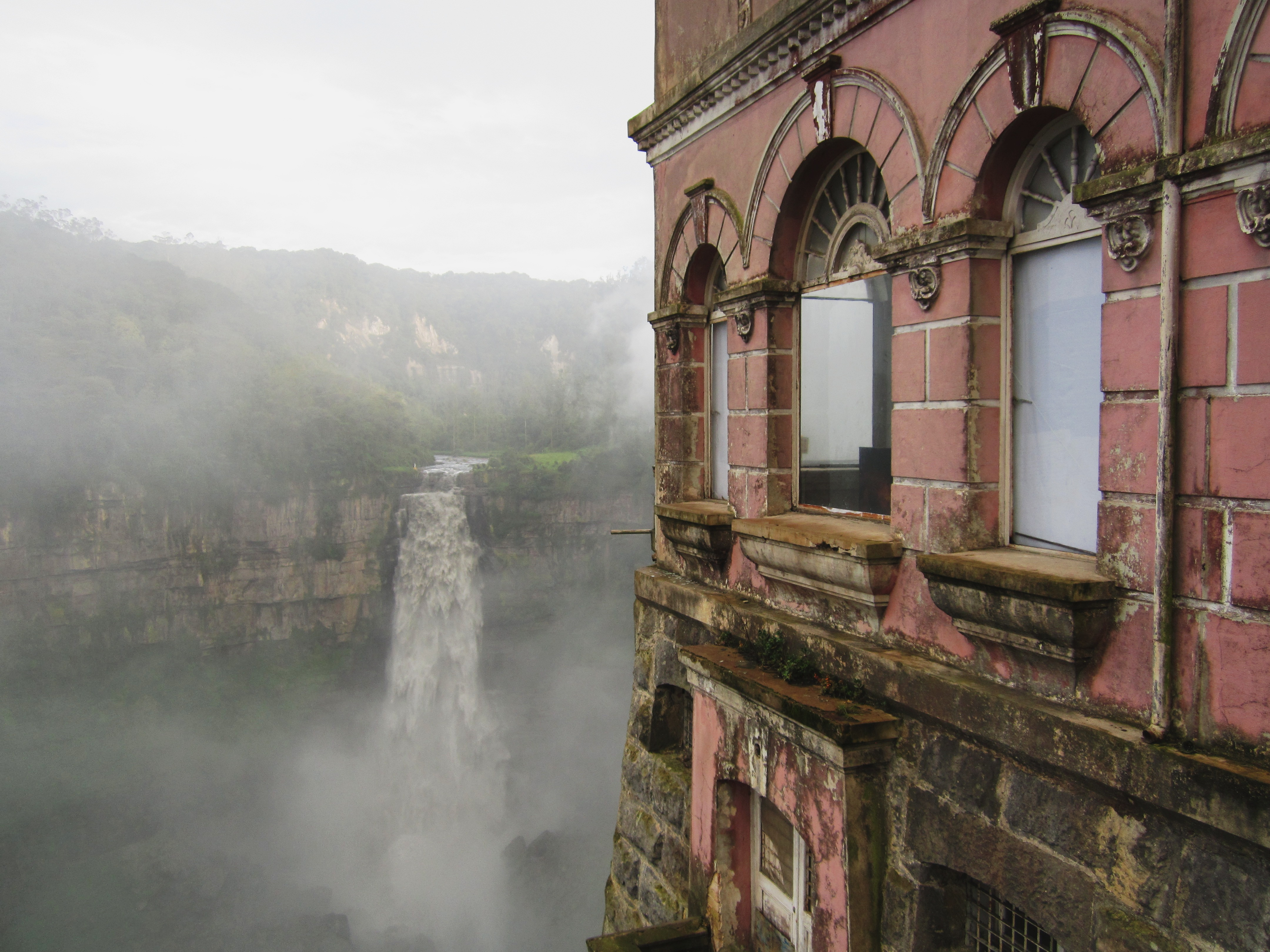
Tequendama Falls on the Bogotá River

In early 2000, the national government developed two key policy instruments to control wastewater pollution. First, the National Plan for Municipal Wastewater Management (PMAR), which provides a framework for the rapid evolution of wastewater management programs in the large urban areas. This national plan promotes coordinated wastewater management at the local, regional, and national levels by focusing on institutional strengthening and the application of existing planning tools. Furthermore, it promotes the construction of wastewater treatment systems in municipalities with adequate water and sewerage service and with prioritized high impact watersheds, including Río Bogotá, Río Chicamocha, Río Medellin and Río Cauca. Second, the Sanitation and Management of Wastewater Discharge Plan (Plan de Saneamiento y Manejo de Vertimientos, PSMV), which mandates that the service providers indicate programs, projects and activities following an implementation schedule and investment plan aimed at reducing pollution loads in receiving waters and improving wastewater collection in municipal sewer systems. PSMV’s action plans are aligned with other planning instruments, for instance water quality objectives defined by the environmental authority, as well as master plans and investment plans set by the municipalities. These two national policies have been instrumental to support the recent increase of wastewater programs in large cities in Colombia.

=== Urbanization ===
Many countries and major metro centers are experiencing a continuous increase in urbanization and Bogotá is no exception. The population has increased from 4 million in 1973 to 6.8 million in 2006. The population is expected to reach 8.4 million by 2020. This predicted urbanization will continue to exert pressure on the infrastructures, institutions, and water resource management mechanisms that are in place. Furthermore, increased urbanization implies that the construction of more drainage, WWTP, conveyance, and flood control infrastructure will be necessary. All of the housing built by new residents and the subsequent water infrastructure to support a growing population has the effect of reducing impermeable surfaces, thus adding to another one the challenges Bogotá is facing, flood and stormwater control.

=== Wetlands restoration ===
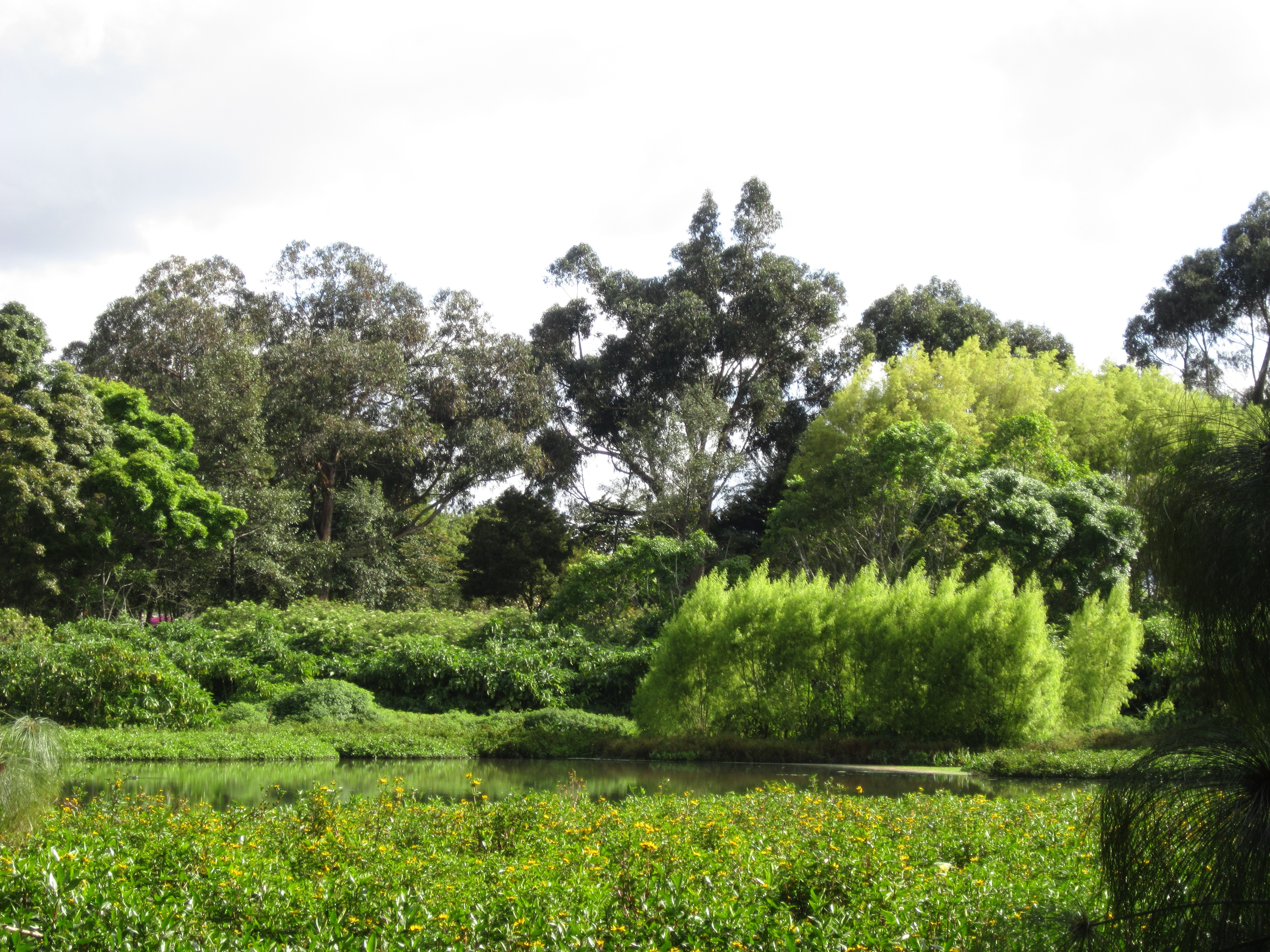
Wetland of Córdoba

In 1950, there were an estimated 50,000 acres (20,000 ha) of wetlands connected to the Bogotá River and by 2009, there was less than 2,500 acres (1,000 ha) remaining. Much of the wetlands have been degraded by poor water quality. In response to the degradation of the wetlands, a strong environmental movement has emerged in Bogotá that actively promotes the protection and expansion of wetland areas. In 2006, the Bogotá district government passed a comprehensive wetlands management policy where the district government, EAAB, and CAR work together to protect rivers and wetlands utilizing new regulations and environmental management programs. The basin plan for the Río Bogotá (POMCA) established water quality standards for the river basin until the year 2020, and designates water uses through river segments and sets ambient water quality criteria of approximately 25 pollutants in order to meet the designated uses.

=== Flooding and river restoration ===
Prior to 1950, the Bogotá River meandered through the middle of the basin with wide riparian areas, extensive flood plains, and thriving ecosystems such as the La Conejera, Juan Amarillo, and Jaboque wetlands. Rapid urbanization has resulted in the channelization of the river, destruction of wetlands and settlements along the river making the river increasingly prone to flooding. In response, CAR has incorporated a flood works program to widen and protect riparian zones, restore the natural meander of the river, and hydraulically connect the river to its flood plains. In one particular component of a World Bank loan (see Multi-stakeholder assistance below) to CAR, EAAB, and the District Government; the Flood Control and Environmental Works project finances a comprehensive river recuperation program that incorporates best practice in urban river restoration. This component consists of improving flood control from an existing 10-25-year return period to a 100-year period, restoring part of the river flood plain, creating and enhancing wetlands and multifunctional parks, and complementing wastewater infrastructure with existing wastewater treatment when possible.

The water company EAAB is actively involved in a participatory program of ecological recovery of the wetlands alongside the river. Program objectives include: the recuperation, protection, and conservation of wetlands; restoring the ecosystem services that these wetlands provide to biodiversity; enjoyment of these landscapes; and improved environmental education. These goals are to be met through the development of new lines of action and support from working in collaboration with the District Secretary of Environment, environmental organizations, and other government players. Program objectives are to conform to a current framework of environmental regulations, the wetland policy set by the district capital, and the terms as defined in the Ramsar Convention on wetlands. Specific ecosystem services provided by the wetlands that will be attained include; flood control, stabilization of biogeochemical cycles, carbon sequestration and diversification of aquatic habitats and wildlife.

== Institutional framework ==
The municipal government of the Bogotá Capital District has been involved in the mediation and delegation of responsibilities. Convenio 171 was the resulting document of a judge ruling that dictated terms to both CAR and EAAB. These two institutions agreed to terms of responsibility with the overall goal of recuperating the Bogotá River and improving flood control.

- Corporación Autónoma Regional (CAR) of the Cundinamarca Department is the regional environmental agency with responsibility to execute the environmental policies of the National Government. More specifically, CAR carries out conservation, recuperation, and decontamination of renewable natural resources.
- Empresa de Agua y Alcantarillado de Bogotá (EAAB) is the Water and sewerage company of Bogotá. Wholly owned and operated by the Colombian government, EAAB has transformed from a near bankrupt company into a financially sound utility. EAAB work focuses on the following: i) construction of wastewater interceptors; ii) design and implementation of the wastewater treatment scheme; iii) implementation of a water quality monitoring network in water courses; and iv) installation of a water quality monitoring network in the sewer system. EAAB is responsible for building new interceptors that will carry wastewater to the treatment plants. While CAR is constructing the new Salitre treatment plant, EAAB is responsible for operation and maintenance of the plant. EAAB is also responsible for recuperation of wetlands alongside of the Bogotá River.
- EMGESA is the Bogotá Power Company that generates and commercializes electric energy under the terms of Law 143 from 1994. EMGESA has been growing in large part to its hydroelectric projects of the Muña Reservoir and further downstream on the Magdalena River.
- El Ministro del Ambiente is the Ministry of Environment, responsible for the promotion of sustainable development through the formulation and adoption of policies, plans, programs, projects and regulation in environmental matters, renewable natural resources, land use, drinking water and basic sanitation, and territorial and urban development.
- Departamento Nacional de Planeacion (DNP) is the National Department of Planning and their basic tasks are the preparation, monitoring and evaluation of policies, general plans, programs and projects of the public sector. The DNP is charged with the long-term monitoring of the national and international economies, as well as proposing plans and programs for the economic, social and environmental development of the country.
- The Environmental Secretary (Secretaria Ambiental) is the environmental authority in the Bogotá Capital District and has administrative and financial autonomy. Their objective is to formulate environmental policies and regulate its implementation. Both the Environmental Secretary and the EAAB are representatives of the district to the Bogotá river environmental strategy.
- The Water Regulatory Commission (CRA) is responsible for defining tariff-setting methodologies and setting service quality.
- The Superintendency of Public Enterprises (SSPD) is responsible for monitoring and supervising the adequacy and efficiency of utility operations.

== See also ==
- Bogotá River
  - Fucha River
  - Tunjuelo River
- Water resources management in Colombia
- Irrigation in Colombia
- Integrated urban water management in Medellín
