= Integrated urban water management =

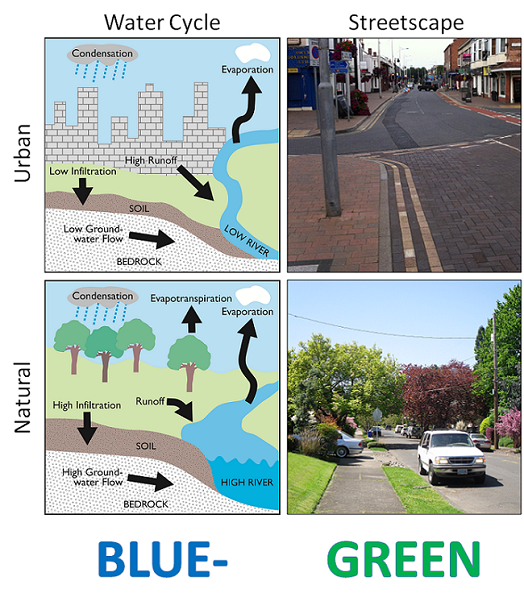
Comparing the natural and urban water cycle and streetscapes in conventional and Blue-Green Cities

Integrated urban water management (IUWM) is the practice of managing freshwater, wastewater, and storm water as components of a basin-wide management plan. It builds on existing water supply and sanitation considerations within an urban settlement by incorporating urban water management within the scope of the entire river basin. IUWM is commonly seen as a strategy for achieving the goals of Water Sensitive Urban Design. IUWM seeks to change the impact of urban development on the natural water cycle, based on the premise that by managing the urban water cycle as a whole; a more efficient use of resources can be achieved providing not only economic benefits but also improved social and environmental outcomes. One approach is to establish an inner, urban, water cycle loop through the implementation of reuse strategies. Developing this urban water cycle loop requires an understanding both of the natural, pre-development, water balance and the post-development water balance. Accounting for flows in the pre- and post-development systems is an important step toward limiting urban impacts on the natural water cycle.

IUWM within an urban water system can also be conducted by performance assessment of any new intervention strategies by developing a holistic approach which encompasses various system elements and criteria including sustainability type ones in which integration of water system components including water supply, waste water and storm water subsystems would be advantageous. Simulation of metabolism type flows in urban water system can also be useful for analysing processes in urban water cycle of IUWM.

== Components ==
Activities under the IUWM include the following:

- Improve water supply and consumption efficiency
- Upgrade drinking water quality and wastewater treatment
- Increase economic efficiency of services to sustain operations and investments for water, wastewater, and stormwater management
- Utilize alternative water sources, including rainwater, and reclaimed and treated water
- Engage communities to reflect their needs and knowledge for water management
- Establish and implement policies and strategies to facilitate the above activities
- Support capacity development of personnel and institutions that are engaged in IUWM

According to Australia's Commonwealth Scientific and Industrial Research Organisation (CSIRO), IUWM requires the management of the urban water cycle in coordination with the hydrological water cycle which are significantly altered by urban landscapes and its correlation to increasing demand. Under natural conditions the water inputs at any point in the system are precipitation and overland flows; while the outputs are via surface flows, evapo-transpiration and groundwater recharge. The large volumes of piped water introduced with the change to an urban setting and the introduction of vast impervious areas strongly impact the water balance, increasing in-flows and dramatically altering the out-flow components.

== Approaches ==
- The Agenda 21 (UN Department for Sustainable Development, 1992) has worked out the Dublin Principles for Integrated water resources management in more detail for urban areas. One of the objectives of Agenda 21 is to develop environmentally sound management of water resources for urban use.
- The Bellagio Statement formulated by the Environmental Sanitation Working Group of the Water Supply and Sanitation Collaborative Council in 2000 include principals such as: Human dignity, quality of life, environmental security, an open stakeholder process, and many others.
- The UNEP 3 Step Strategic Approach developed in 2005 is based on the application of the "Cleaner Production approach" that has been successful in the industrial sector. The three steps are: Prevention, Treatment for reuse, and Planned discharge with stimulation of self-purification capacity.
- UNESCO's Institute for Water Education seeks to build on the progress made by the Bellagio Statement and UNEP's 3-step approach by developing the SWITCH approach to IUWM. Components include: the addition of a sustainability assessment, new methods of planning urban water systems, and modifications to planning and strategy development.

== Examples ==
An example of IUWM is the Catskill/ Delaware water system that provides 1.4 billion US gallons (5,300,000 m^{3}) of water per day, including to all of New York City. The IUWM process included an extensive stakeholder engagement process, whereby the needs of all parties were included into the final management plan. A partnership was created between New York City, the agricultural community, and the federal government. The case has become a model for successful IUWM.

=== Urban decision support systems ===
Urban Decision Support System (UDSS) – is a data-driven urban water management system that uses sensors attached to water appliances in urban residences to collect data about water usage. The system was developed with a European Commission investment of 2.46 Million Euros to improve the water consumption behavior of households. Information about appliances and facilities such as dishwashers, showers, washing machines, taps – is wirelessly recorded and sent to the UDSS App on the user's mobile device. The UDSS is then able to analyze and show homeowners which appliances are using the most water, and which behavior or habits should be avoided in order to reduce the water usage.

== Challenges ==
One of the most significant challenges for IUWM could be securing a consensus on the definition of IUWM and the implementation of stated objectives at operational stages of projects. In the developing world there is still a significant fraction of the population that has no access to proper water supply and sanitation. At the same time, population growth, urbanization and industrialization continue to cause pollution and depletion of water sources. In the developed world, pollution of water sources is threatening the sustainability of urban water systems. Climate change is likely to affect all urban centers, either with increasingly heavy storms or with prolonged droughts, or perhaps both. To address the challenges facing IUWM it is crucial to develop good approaches, so that policy development and planning are directed towards addressing these global change pressures, and to achieving truly sustainable urban water systems.

== See also ==
- One Water (Management)
- Integrated urban water management in Tegucigalpa
- International trade and water
- Water management in Greater Mexico City
- Water management in the Metropolitan Region of São Paulo
- Water security
