= Nazareth (disambiguation) =

Nazareth is a city in Israel, described in the New Testament as the childhood home of Jesus.

Nazareth may also refer to:

- Nazareth (surname)

== Places and jurisdictions ==
=== Africa ===
- Nazareth, Ethiopia, now Adama
- Nazareth, Lesotho

=== Asia ===
- Nazareth, Tamil Nadu, India
- Roman Catholic Archbishopric of Nazareth, a former residential metropolitan see, and successor Latin and a Maronite titular sees

=== Europe ===
- Nazareth, Belgium
- Nazareth in Barletta, Italy, home of the Archbishops of Nazareth in exile from 1327

=== North America ===
- Nazareth, Kentucky, United States
- Nazareth, Pennsylvania, United States
  - Nazareth Historic District
  - Lower Nazareth Township, Pennsylvania
  - Upper Nazareth Township, Pennsylvania
- Nazareth, Texas, United States
- Nazareth, U.S. Virgin Islands

=== South America ===
- Nazareth (Asunción), Paraguay

=== Oceania ===
- Nazareth, Pentecost Island, Vanuatu

=== South America ===
- Nazareth, Peru

== Other uses ==
- Nazareth (band), a Scottish rock band
  - Nazareth (album), 1971
- Nazareth Speedway, a former auto racing facility near Nazareth, Pennsylvania, U.S.
- Nazareth Bank, a large submerged bank in the Indian Ocean
- "Nazareth", short for Jésus de Nazareth (song) by Charles Gounod
- Waters Of Nazareth, song by Justice

== See also ==
- Nazaré (disambiguation)
- Nazarene (disambiguation)
- Nazareth Academy (disambiguation)
- Nazareth College (disambiguation)
- Nazaret (name), a variant of Nazareth in many languages
- Beatrice of Nazareth (c. 1200 – 1268), a Flemish Cistercian nun
- Sisters of Nazareth, Roman Catholic religious sisters who live in Nazareth Houses
