= Nazareno =

Nazareno may refer to:

- Nazareno, Minas Gerais, a municipality in Brazil
- Nazareno, Salta, a village and rural municipality in Argentina
- Nazareno, a term referring to Jesus
- Nazareno, the common shortened title of the Filipino devotional image Black Nazarene
- Nazareno (Spain), a member of a cofradía who perform easter parades
- Nazareno (surname)
- El Nazareno (born 1979), Puerto Rican professional wrestler
- Nazareno Cruz and the Wolf, a 1975 Argentine fantasy drama film

== See also ==
- Jesús Nazareno District, Peru
- Hospital de Jesús Nazareno, Mexico
- Nazarene (disambiguation)
- Nazarus (disambiguation)
- Nazareth (disambiguation)
