= Nazareth High School =

Nazareth High School may refer to:

- Nazareth Area High School, Nazareth, Pennsylvania
- Nazareth Regional High School (Brooklyn), New York
- Nazareth Academy High School, Philadelphia, Pennsylvania
- Nazareth High School (Texas)

== See also ==
- Nazareth Academy
