= Nazari =

Nazari (Persian: نظری) is a surname and given name of Persian and Italian origins, meaning in Persian "Son of Nazar" (a given name) or "(son) of Nazareth". The name comes from the town Nazareth, where Jesus spent his youth.

== Notable people with the surname Nazari ==
- Bartolomeo Nazari (1693–1758), Italian painter
- Omid Nazari (born 1991), Iranian footballer
- Amin Nazari (born 1993), Swedish footballer
- Hassan Nazari (born 1956), Iranian footballer
- Luigi Nazari di Calabiana (1808–1893), Italian churchman
- Mostafa Nazari (born 1982), Iranian futsal player
- Wahed Nazari (born 1953), Afghan film director
- Samuel Soroosh Nazari, known as Allyawan, Swedish artist

== Notable people with the given name Nazari ==
- Nazariy Yaremchuk (1951–1995), Ukraininan singer

== See also ==
- Nasrid dynasty
- Nazarene
