= Swiss Brazilians =

Swiss Brazilians brasileiros suíços, helveto-brasileiros
Suíço-Brasileiro
- (Brazil) (Switzerland)
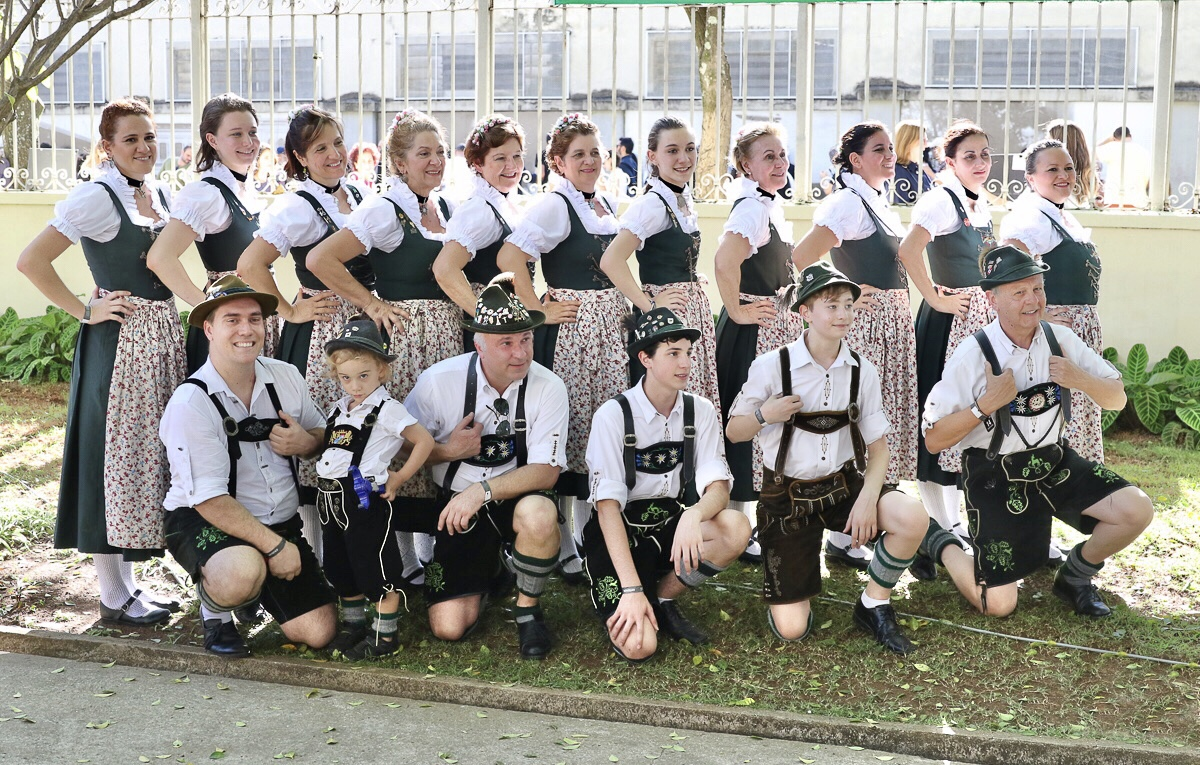
- Swiss descendants in São Paulo.

Regions with significant populations
- 500K - 5 million Across The South and Southeastern Regions

Languages
- Portuguese, German, French, Italian

Religion
- Christianity (mostly Protestantism and Roman Catholic), Judaism (Ashkenazi Jews)

Related ethnic groups
- Other White Brazilian (especially German Brazilians, Austrian Brazilians, Luxembourg Brazilians, French Brazilians and Italian Brazilians), Swiss people

Swiss Brazilians (Portuguese: helveto-brasileiros, brasileiros suíços) are Brazilian citizens of full or partial Swiss ancestry, who remain culturally connected to Switzerland, or Swiss-born people permanently residing in Brazil.

== Notable Swiss Brazilians ==
- Clóvis Bornay
- José Carlos Bauer
- Émil Goeldi
- Oswaldo Goeldi
- Ernst Götsch
- Cláudio Heinrich
- Heloísa Périssé
- Ricardo Boechat
- Adriana Lima
- Adolfo Lutz
- Berta Lutz
- Jorge Paulo Lemann
- Eric Walther Maleson
- Gérard Moss
- Sabrina Sato
- Leticia Spiller
- Xuxa Meneghel

== See also ==
- Immigration to Brazil
- White Brazilians
- Swiss people
- Swiss Americans
- Austrian Brazilians
- French Brazilians
- German Brazilians
- Italian Brazilians
