= Nazaret (name) =

Nazaret is a variant of Nazareth in many languages and a given name and surname. Notable people with the name include:

- Nazaret Daghavarian (1862–1915), Armenian Ottoman doctor, agronomist and public activist, and one of the founders of the Armenian General Benevolent Union
- Magno Nazaret (born 1986), Brazilian professional racing cyclist

== See also ==
- Nazar (given name)
- Nazareth (disambiguation)
- Nazareth (surname)
