= Deforestation of the Amazon rainforest =

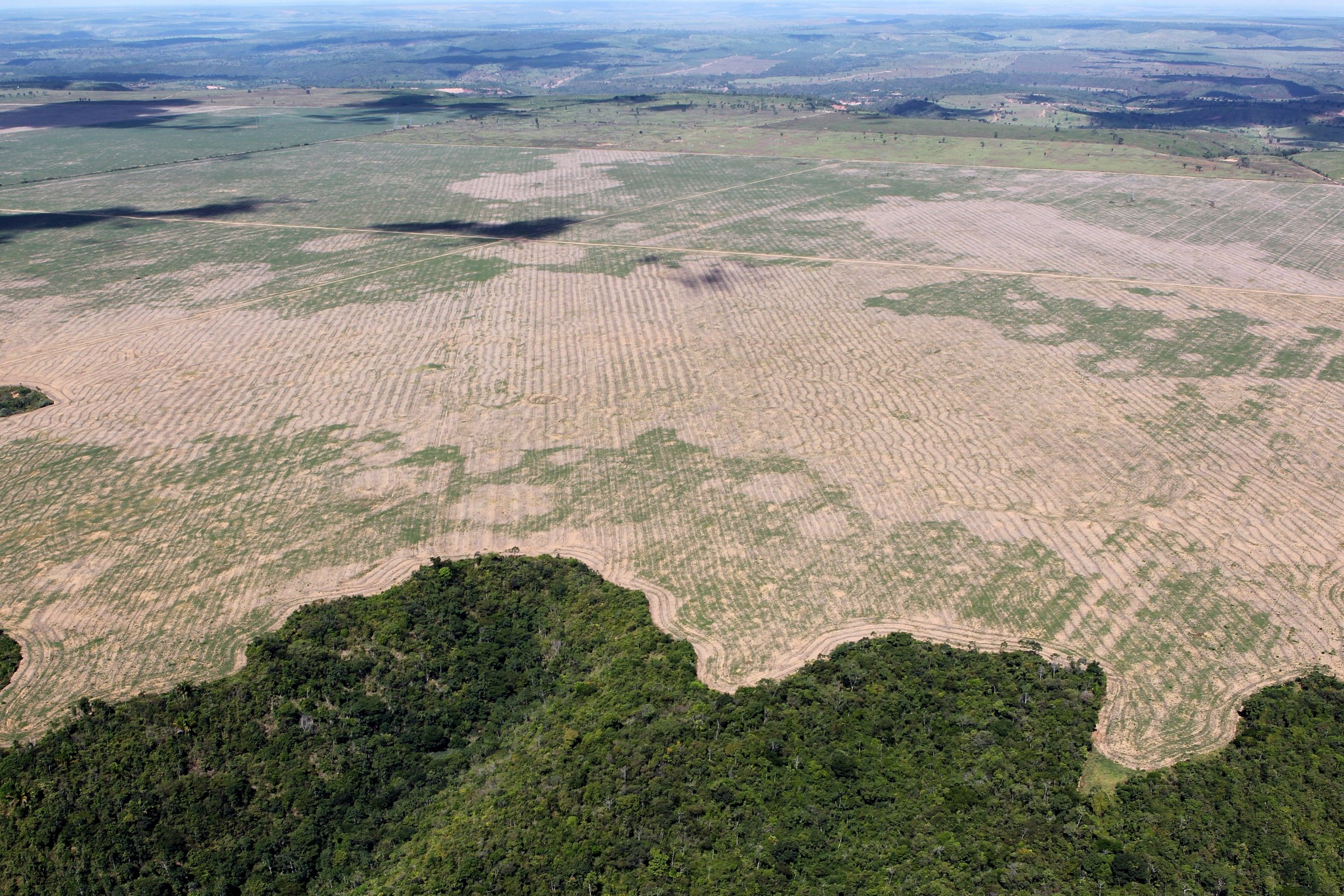
Deforestation in the Maranhão state of Brazil, July 2016

The Amazon rainforest, spanning an area of 3,000,000 km^{2} (1,200,000 sq mi), is the world's largest rainforest. It encompasses the largest and most biodiverse tropical rainforest on the planet, representing over half of all rainforests. The Amazon region includes the territories of nine nations, with Brazil containing the majority (60%), followed by Peru (13%), Colombia (10%), and smaller portions in Venezuela, Ecuador, Bolivia (6%), Guyana, Suriname, and French Guiana. Over one-third of the Amazon rainforest is designated as formally acknowledged Indigenous territory, amounting to more than 3,344 territories. Historically, Indigenous Amazonian peoples have relied on the forest for various needs such as food, shelter, water, fiber, fuel, and medicines. The forest holds significant cultural and cosmological importance for them. But more recently, the Amazon rainforest has been being cut down due to cattle farming and soybean farming. Soybean production is a major driver of deforestation in the Amazon, with cultivation increasing by over 300% in certain periods. Although often grown on previously cleared cattle land, expanding "soy frontiers" directly destroy forests. The 2006 Soy Moratorium, which banned buying soy from newly deforested areas, is currently weakening.

Despite external pressures, deforestation rates are comparatively lower in Indigenous territories due to legal land titling initiatives that have reduced deforestation by 75% in Peru. By the year 2022, around 26% of the forest was considered as deforested or highly degraded. According to the Council on Foreign Relations, 300,000 square miles have been lost. According to the Food and Agriculture Organization, approximately 10 million hectares of global forests are lost every year. Between 2010-2020, the net loss in forests globally was 4.7 million hectares per year.

Cattle ranching in the Brazilian Amazon has been identified as the primary cause of deforestation, accounting for about 80% of all deforestation in the region. This makes it the world's largest single driver of deforestation, contributing to approximately 14% of the global annual deforestation. Government tax revenue has subsidized much of the agricultural activity leading to deforestation. By 1995, 70% of previously forested land in the Amazon and 91% of land deforested since 1970 had been converted for cattle ranching. The remaining deforestation primarily results from mechanized cropland producing crops such as soy and palm and poor small-scale subsistence farmers who are encouraged to settle down in Amazonian forests by government land policies. In 2011, soy bean farming was estimated to account for around 15% of deforestation in the Amazon.

Satellite data from 2018 revealed a decade-high rate of deforestation in the Amazon, with approximately 7,900 km^{2} (3,100 sq mi) destroyed between August 2017 and July 2018. The states of Mato Grosso and Pará experienced the highest levels of deforestation during this period. Illegal logging was cited as a cause by the Brazilian environment minister, while critics highlighted the expansion of agriculture as a factor encroaching on the rainforest. Researchers warn that the forest may reach a tipping point where it cannot generate sufficient rainfall to sustain itself.

In May 2025, research from the University of Maryland’s Global Land Analysis and Discovery (GLAD) Lab, published via the World Resources Institute’s Global Forest Watch platform, found that global forest loss surged to record highs in 2024. Loss of tropical primary forests reached 6.7 million hectares—nearly twice the area lost in 2023 and roughly equivalent to the size of Panama. Brazil accounted for 42% of total tropical primary forest loss, largely driven by fires exacerbated by the country’s worst drought on record. Fires caused 66% of Brazil’s forest loss in 2024, a more than sixfold increase from 2023. The Amazon experienced its highest tree cover loss since 2016.

== History ==
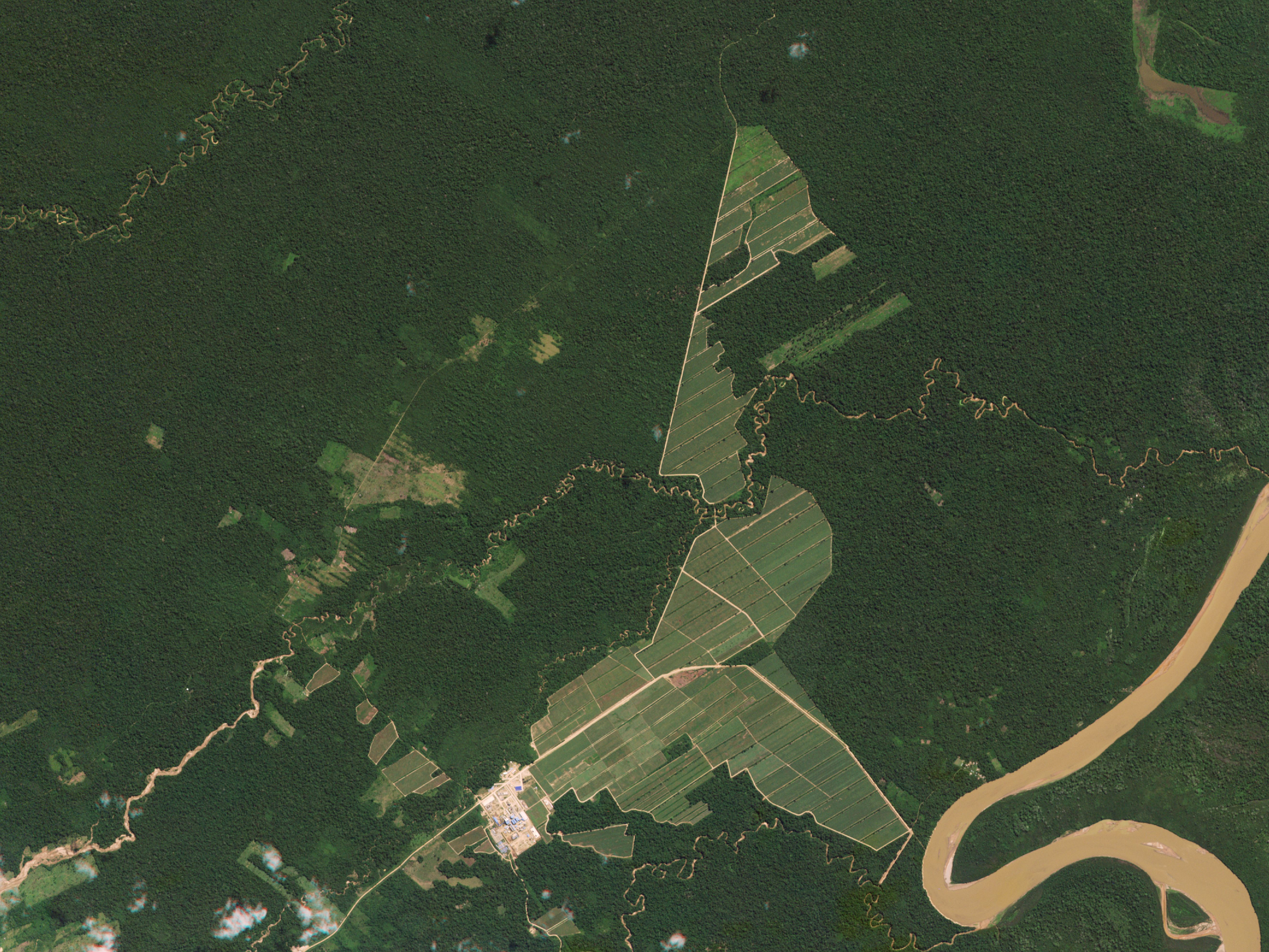
Deforestation in Bolivia, in June 2014

In the pre-Columbian era, certain parts of the Amazon rainforest were densely populated and cultivated. However, European colonization in the 16th century, driven by the pursuit of gold and later by the rubber boom, depopulated the region due to diseases and slavery, leading to forest regrowth.

Until the 1970s, access to the largely roadless interior of the forest was challenging, and it remained mostly intact apart from partial clearing along the rivers. Deforestation escalated after the construction of highways penetrating deep into the forest, such as the Trans-Amazonian Highway in 1972.

Challenges arose in parts of the Amazon where poor soil conditions made plantation-based agriculture unprofitable. The crucial turning point in deforestation occurred when colonists began establishing farms within the forest during the 1960s. Their farming practices relied on crop cultivation and the slash-and-burn method. However, due to soil fertility loss and weed invasion, the colonists struggled to effectively manage their fields and crops.

Indigenous areas in the Peruvian Amazon, like the Urarina Chambira River Basin, experience limited soil productivity, leading to the continual clearing of new lands by indigenous horticulturalists. Cattle raising dominated Amazonian colonization as it required less labor, generated acceptable profits, and involved land under state ownership. While promoted as a reforestation measure, the privatization of land was criticized for potentially encouraging further deforestation and disregarding the rights of Peru's indigenous people, who typically lack formal title to land. The associated law, known as Law 840, faced significant resistance and was eventually repealed as unconstitutional.

Illegal deforestation in the Amazon increased in 2015 after decades of decline, driven primarily by consumer demand for products like palm oil. Brazilian farmers clear land to accommodate the growing demand for crops such as palm oil and soy. Deforestation releases significant amounts of carbon, and if current levels continue, the remaining forests worldwide could disappear within 100 years. The Brazilian government implemented the RED (reducing emissions from deforestation and forest degradation) program to combat deforestation, providing support to various African countries through education programs and financial contributions.

In January 2019, Brazil's president, Jair Bolsonaro, issued an executive order granting the agriculture ministry oversight over certain Amazon lands. This decision has been supported by cattle ranchers and mining companies but criticized for endangering indigenous populations and contributing to Brazil's relative contribution to global climate change.

Reports from the year 2021 indicated a 22% increase in deforestation from the previous year, reaching the highest level since 2006.

== Causes of deforestation ==
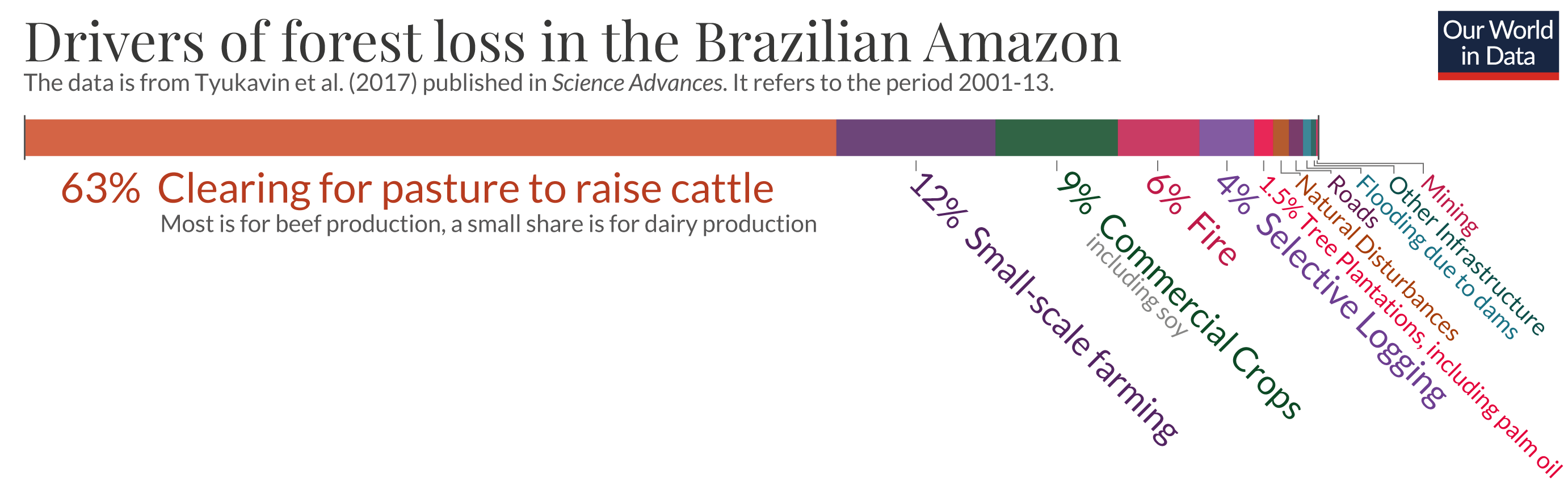
Drivers of forest loss in the Brazilian Amazon. The expansion of agricultural land to raise cattle is by far the most important driver.

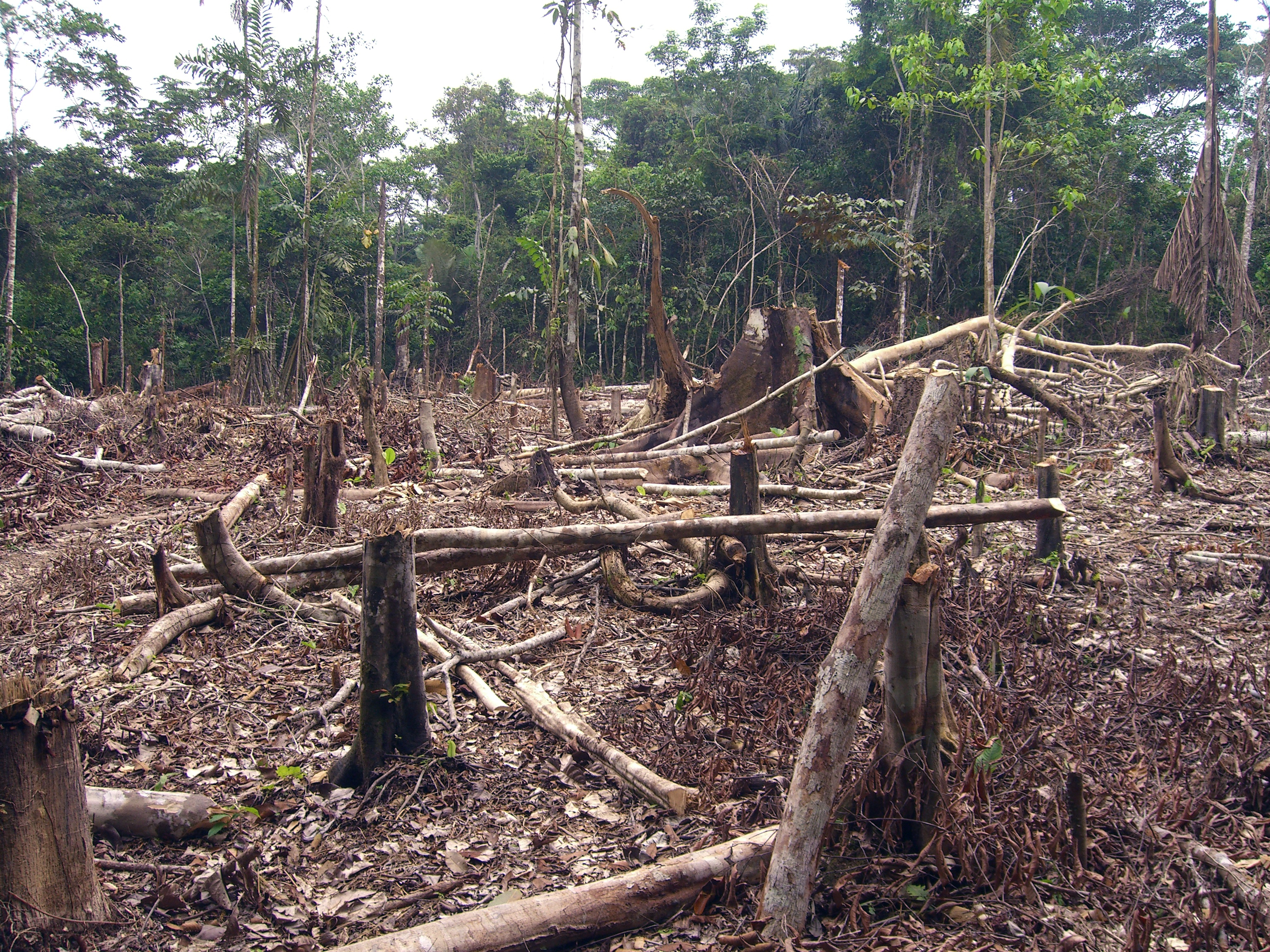
Deforestation in Colombia

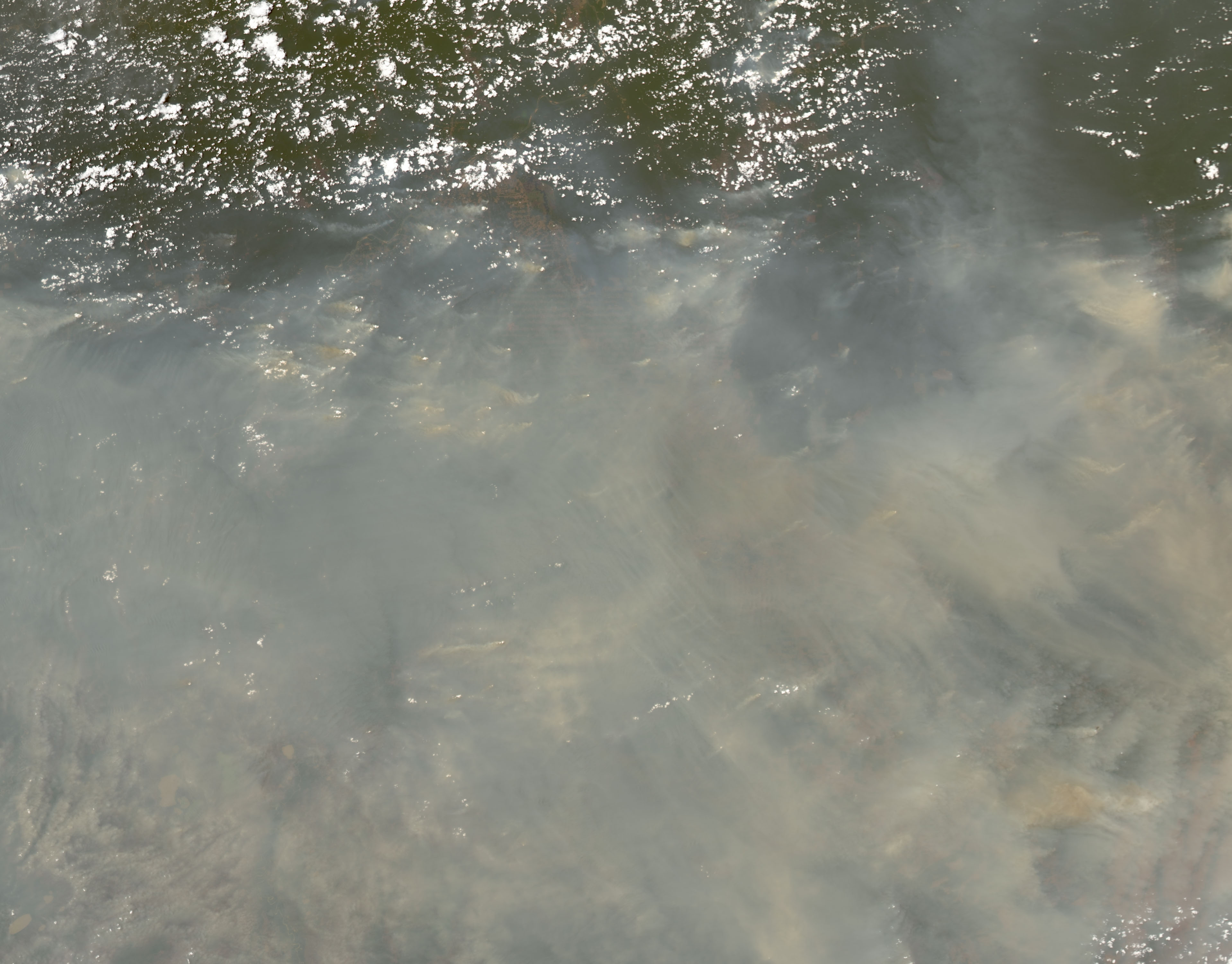
One consequence of forest clearing in the Amazon: thick smoke that hangs over the forest

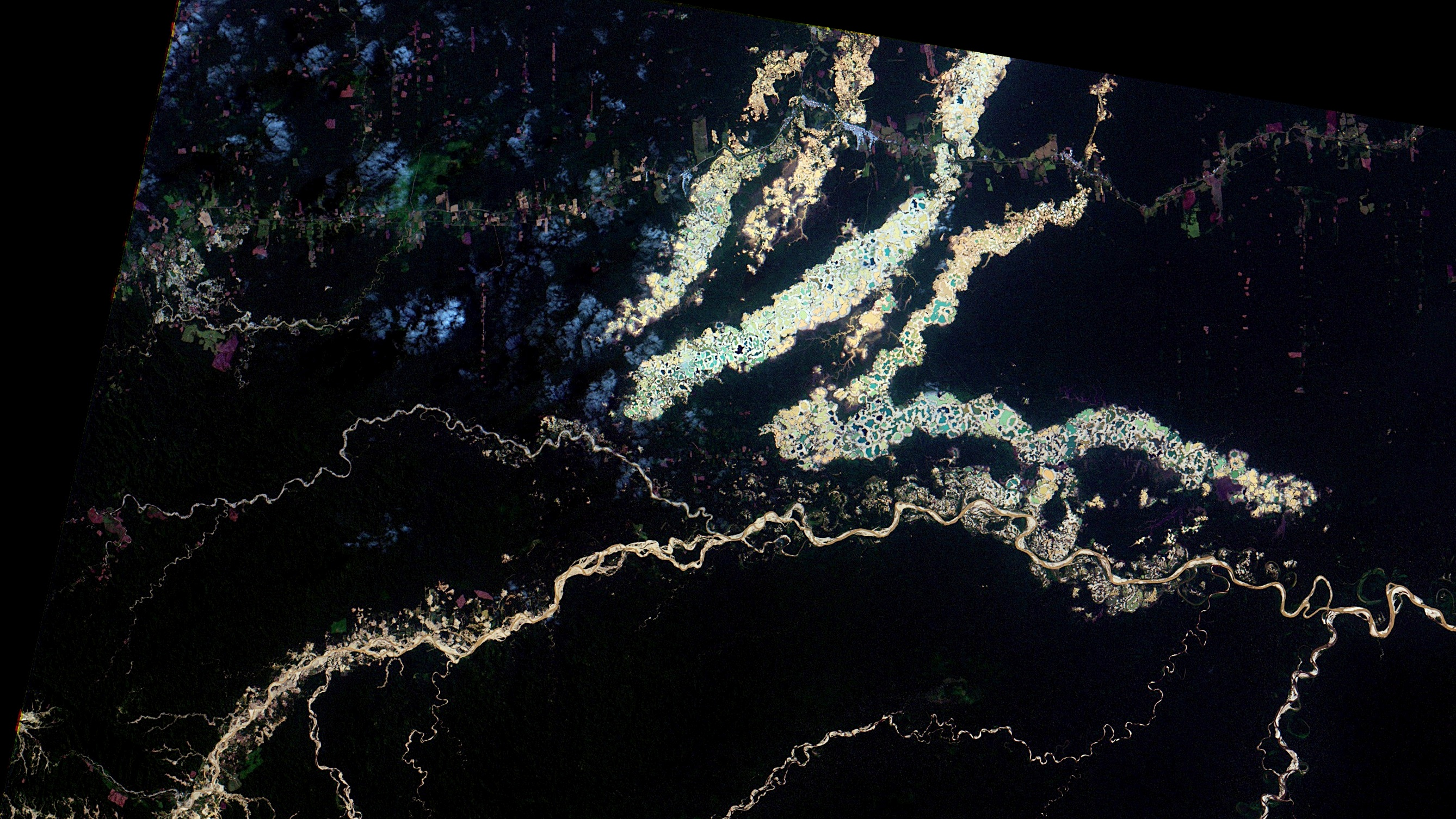
Illegal gold mining in the Amazon in Madre de Dios, Peru, 2019

The deforestation of the Amazon rainforest is influenced by various factors at local, national, and international levels. The rainforest is sought after for purposes such as cattle ranching, the extraction of valuable hardwoods, land for housing and farming (especially soybeans), the construction of roads (including highways and smaller roads), and the collection of medicinal resources. Deforestation in Brazil is also linked to an economic growth model focused on accumulating factors, primarily land, rather than enhancing overall productivity. Illegal logging is a common practice in tree removal during deforestation.

Deforestation in the Amazon is complex and heterogeneous and varies across countries and regions. In the Peruvian Amazon for example, deforestation is caused by a combination of market factors and legal and illegal activities. Examples are logging, cattle ranching, palm oil expansion, mining and coca cultivation.

=== Cattle ranching ===
According to a 2004 World Bank paper and a 2009 Greenpeace report, cattle ranching in the Brazilian Amazon, supported by the international beef and leather trades, has been identified as responsible for approximately 80% of deforestation in the region. This accounts for about 14% of the world's total annual deforestation, making it the largest driver of deforestation globally. The Food and Agriculture Organization of the United Nations reported in 2006 that 70% of previously forested land in the Amazon, as well as 91% of land deforested since 1970, is now used for livestock pasture. The 2019 European Union-Mercosur Free Trade Agreement, which establishes one of the world's largest free trade areas, has faced criticism from environmental activists and advocates for indigenous rights. They argue that the trade agreement will contribute to further deforestation of the Amazon rainforest by expanding market access for Brazilian beef.

Most beef-related deforestation in driven by domestic demand for beef rather than exports; in 2023, Brazil had the third highest beef consumption per capita in the world.

During Jair Bolsonaro's government, certain environmental laws were weakened, accompanied by reductions in funding and personnel in key government agencies and the dismissal of agency heads and state bodies. The deforestation of the Amazon rainforest accelerated during the COVID-19 pandemic in Brazil. According to Brazil's National Institute for Space Research (INPE), deforestation in the Brazilian Amazon increased by more than 50% in the first three months of 2020 compared to the same period in 2019.

In October 2024, Brazil's environmental protection agency, IBAMA, levied fines totaling 365 million reais (US$64 million) on cattle ranches and meatpacking companies, including JBS SA, the world's largest meat packer, for involvement in illegal deforestation in the Amazon. The fines were imposed on companies accused of raising or purchasing cattle from lands that were deforested without authorization.

=== Soy bean ===
Deforestation in the Amazon has occurred as a result of farmers clearing land for mechanized cropland. A study based on NASA satellite data in 2006 revealed that the clearing of land for mechanized cropland had become a significant factor in deforestation in the Brazilian Amazon. This change in land use has had an impact on the region's climate. Researchers discovered that in 2004, a peak year for deforestation, over 20% of the forests in the state of Mato Grosso were converted to cropland. In 2005, when soybean prices decreased by more than 25%, certain areas of Mato Grosso showed a decline in large-scale deforestation events, suggesting that price fluctuations of other crops, beef, and timber could also have a notable influence on future land use in the region.

The cultivation of soybeans, primarily for export and the production of biodiesel and animal feed, has been a significant driver of forest loss in the Amazon. As soybean prices have risen, soy farmers have expanded their activities into forested areas of the Amazon. However, the implementation of a private sector agreement known as the Soy Moratorium has played a crucial role in significantly reducing deforestation associated with soy production in the region. In 2006, several major commodity trading companies, including Cargill, pledged not to purchase soybeans produced in recently deforested areas of the Brazilian Amazon. Prior to the moratorium, 30% of soy field expansion was linked to deforestation, contributing to record-high deforestation rates. After eight years of the moratorium, a study conducted in 2015 found that although the soy production area had expanded by 1.3 million hectares, only about 1% of the new soy expansion had occurred at the expense of forests. In response to the moratorium, farmers opted to plant crops on already cleared land.

The perceived needs of soy farmers have been used to justify certain controversial transportation projects that have been developed in the Amazon. The Belém-Brasília highway (1958) and the Cuiabá-Porto Velho highway (1968) were the only federal highways in the Legal Amazon region that were paved and accessible year-round before the late 1990s. These two highways are considered to be central to the "arc of deforestation," which is presently the primary area of deforestation in the Brazilian Amazon. The Belém-Brasília highway attracted nearly two million settlers in its first twenty years. The success of this highway in opening up the forest was replicated as additional paved roads were constructed, leading to an unstoppable wave of settlement. The completion of these roads was followed by a significant influx of settlers, who also had a substantial impact on the forest.

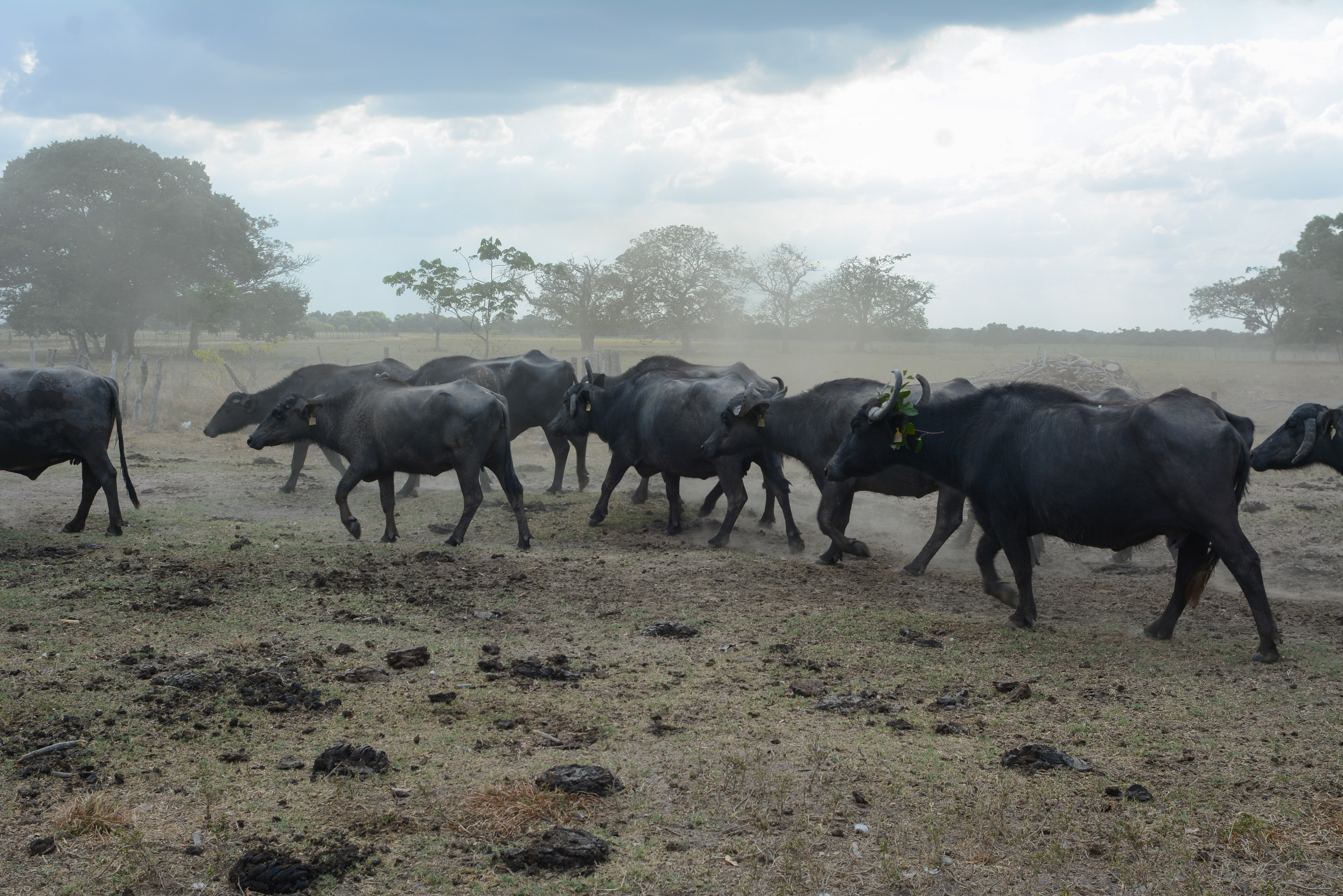
Deforestation for cattle production in Venezuela, 2015.

=== Logging ===
Logging in deforestation refers to the practice of cutting down trees for commercial purposes, primarily for the timber industry, which contributes to the overall deforestation of an area. Deforestation is the permanent removal of forests and vegetation cover from an area, often resulting in ecological, social, and economic impacts.

The logging process typically involves the following steps:

1. Tree selection: Loggers identify and select specific trees for harvesting based on their species, size, and commercial value. Valuable tree species often targeted for logging include mahogany, teak, oak, and other hardwoods.
2. Access and infrastructure development: Loggers establish infrastructure such as roads and trails within the forest to reach the targeted trees. This infrastructure facilitates the transportation of heavy machinery, logging equipment, and harvested timber.
3. Clearing vegetation: Prior to logging, loggers often clear the understory vegetation and smaller trees surrounding the target trees to enhance access and maneuverability for machinery.
4. Tree felling: The selected trees are cut down using chainsaws, harvesters, or other mechanized equipment. The felled trees are then prepared for further processing.
5. Timber extraction: Once the trees are felled, loggers extract the timber from the forest by removing branches and cutting the tree trunks into logs of appropriate sizes for transport.
6. Log transportation: Extracted logs are transported from the logging site to processing facilities or storage areas using trucks, barges, or helicopters, depending on the accessibility of the area.
7. Processing and utilization: At processing facilities, the harvested logs are further processed into lumber, plywood, or other wood products. These products find applications in various industries, such as construction, furniture manufacturing, or paper production.

The impacts of logging on deforestation are significant and wide-ranging. These effects include losses of biodiversity in affected regions. Logging often leads to the destruction of forest ecosystems, resulting in the loss of habitat for numerous plant and animal species. Loss of biodiversity also leads to negative effects in terms of forest resilience to global shifts, as well as the adaptability of ecosystems.

Trees play a crucial role in mitigating climate change by absorbing carbon dioxide through photosynthesis. In a 2023 study, researchers found that carbon stocks in the Amazon region were reduced following logging processes, demonstrating the negative impact that logging has on the forest's ability to store carbon and regulate global carbon emissions.

Logging contributes to soil erosion and degradation. Forests provide a protective cover for the soil, preventing erosion by wind and water. The removal of trees makes the exposed soil more vulnerable to erosion, leading to the loss of fertile topsoil and the degradation of the land. Additionally, the increased openness of the canopy due to logging has been found to increase herbivory rates in seedlings within the Amazon. This means seedlings are being damaged or eaten by herbivores at a higher rate, leading to soil and ecosystem damage.

Forests play a crucial role in the water cycle, acting as natural water catchments, regulating water flow, and maintaining water quality. They have profound effects on local ecosystems, climate, and agriculture. Logging and deforestation disrupt these vital functions, as well as resulting in reduced rainfall and an increased risk of drought.

Many indigenous peoples and communities depend on forests for their livelihoods, cultural practices, and sustenance. Deforestation and logging can displace these communities, undermine their traditional way of life, and create social conflicts. These conflicts over land disputes and logging rights have led to the deaths of numerous indigenous people. Indigenous territories in the Amazon also serve as a bulwark against deforestation, logging, and wildfires, making logging in these territories detrimental to the region as a whole.

While logging can provide economic benefits in terms of employment and revenue generation, unsustainable logging practices can deplete forest resources and undermine long-term economic sustainability and benefits. Overexploitation of forests can lead to the loss of potential future income and economic opportunities.

Efforts to address the impacts of logging on deforestation include implementing sustainable forest management practices, promoting reforestation and afforestation, establishing protected areas, enforcing regulations and policies, and supporting alternative livelihood options for local communities dependent on forests.

A 2013 paper found a correlation between rainforest logging in the Amazon and reduced precipitation in the area, resulting in lower yields per hectare. This suggests that, on a broader scale, there is no economic gain for Brazil through logging, selling trees, and using the cleared land for pastoral purposes.

=== Oil and Gas Development ===
Oil and gas projects in the western Amazon are a significant driver of deforestation and associated environmental impacts. These projects contribute to forest loss, water pollution, and the displacement of indigenous peoples. The lack of robust regulatory frameworks exacerbates the vulnerability of these areas to exploitation, creating a multifaceted threat to the Amazon's biodiversity and local communities. According to a September 2016 report by Amazon Watch, the importation of crude oil by the US is linked to about 20,000 sq mi (~50,000 km^{2}) of rainforest destruction in the Amazon and the emission of substantial greenhouse gases. These impacts are mostly focused in the western Amazon countries of Ecuador, Peru, and Colombia. The report also indicates that oil exploration is occurring in an additional ~100,000 sq mi (~250,000 km^{2}) of rainforest.

=== Roads ===
95% of the deforestation in the Amazon Rainforest "happens within 3.4 miles of a roadway". Forest clearing always begins near new roads, after expands further. In December 2023 the lower house of the Brazilian Congress approved a bill aiming to pave again the high way BR-319 (Brazil highway), what can threaten the existence of the rainforest. The bill defines the road as "critical infrastructure, indispensable to national security, requiring the guarantee of its trafficability,"

=== Mining ===
Mining is a significant contributor to the deforestation of the Amazon rainforest. In the years 2005-2015 it accounted for 9% of deforestation. The expansion of mining activities in the region has subsequently led to higher levels of deforestation, which has numerous environmental impacts. These mining-induced deforestation effects include droughts, wildfires, floods, and damage to the local climate in general.

=== Climate change ===
Climate change seriously increases the likelihood of droughts in the Amazon rainforest, which severely hurt the forest. In 2023, the Brazilian Amazon experienced extensive droughts that ruined the river system and brought their levels to record lows. World Weather Attribution found that climate change and increased global temperatures are the main reason for the region's lack of precipitation and droughts.

=== Other ===
During August 2019, a prolonged forest fire occurred in the Amazon, contributing significantly to deforestation during that summer. Approximately 519 sq mi (1,340 km^{2}) of the Amazon forest was lost. It is worth noting that certain instances of deforestation in the Amazon have been attributed to farmers clearing land for small-scale subsistence agriculture.

== Loss rates ==
Home to much of the Amazon rainforest, Brazil's tropical primary (old-growth) forest loss greatly exceeds that of other countries.

Overall, 20% of the Amazon rainforest has been "transformed" (deforested) and another 6% has been "highly degraded", causing Amazon Watch to warn that the Amazonia is in the midst of a tipping point crisis.

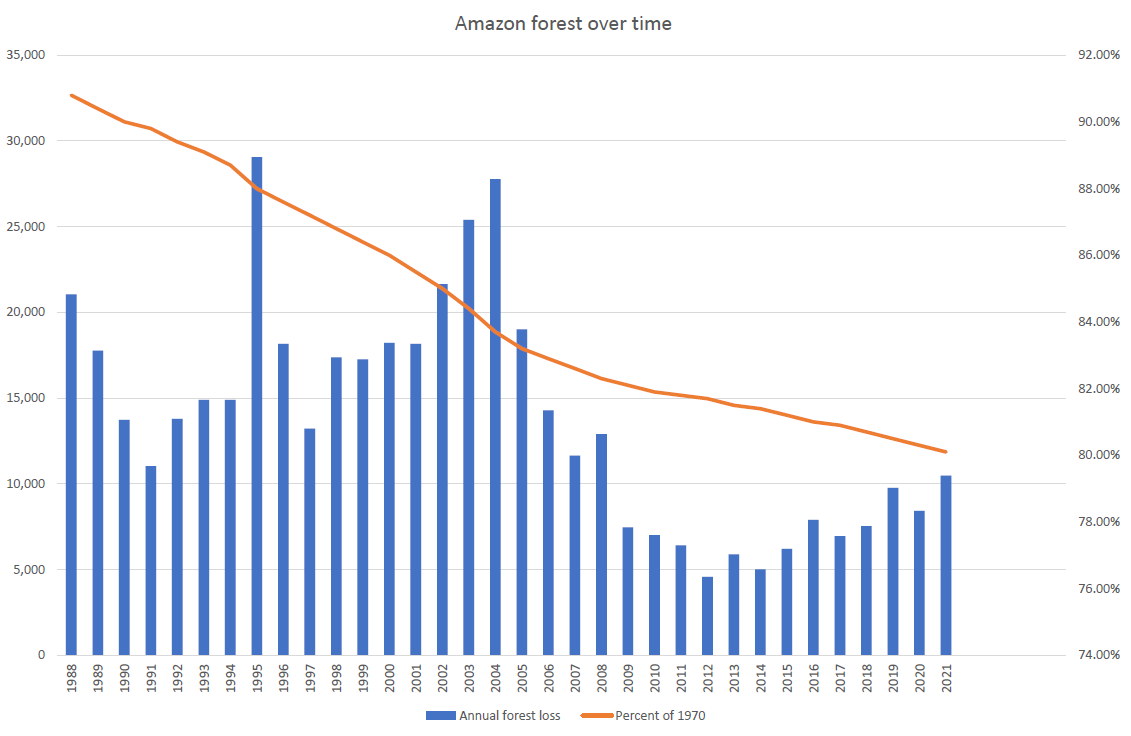

During the early 2000s, deforestation in the Amazon rainforest showed an increasing trend, with an annual rate of 27,423 km^{2} (10,588 sq mi) of forest loss recorded in 2004. Subsequently, the annual rate of forest loss generally slowed between 2004 and 2012, although there were spikes in deforestation rates in 2008, 2013, and 2015.

However, recent data suggests that the loss of forest cover is once again accelerating. Between August 2017 and July 2018, approximately 7,900 km^{2} (3,100 sq mi) of forest were deforested in Brazil, representing a 13.7% increase compared to the previous year and the largest area cleared since 2008. Deforestation in the Brazilian Amazon rainforest experienced a significant surge in June 2019, rising more than 88% compared to the same month in 2018. and more than doubling in January 2020 compared to January 2019.. Despite this expansion, the human impact on the Amazon biome is still considerably less than other Brazilian biomes.

In August 2019, a substantial number of forest fires, totaling 30,901 individual fires, were reported, marking a threefold increase compared to the previous year. However, the number of fires decreased by one-third in September, and by October 7, it had dropped to approximately 10,000. Deforestation is considered to have more severe consequences than burning. The National Institute for Space Research (INPE) in Brazil estimated that at least 7,747 km^{2} (2,991 sq mi) of the Brazilian Amazon rainforest were cleared during the first half of 2019. INPE subsequently reported that deforestation in the Brazilian Amazon reached a 12-year high between August 2019 and July 2020.

Deforestation figures in Brazil are annually provided by the Instituto Nacional de Pesquisas Espaciais (INPE), based on satellite images captured during the dry season in the Amazon by the Landsat satellite. It's important to note that these estimates may focus solely on the loss of the Amazon rainforest and may not include the loss of natural fields or savannah within the Amazon biome.

In 2026, deforestation in the Brazilian Amazon fell for a all time low record. Preliminary PRODES dat from INPE displayed that 3,335 km squared of the forest was cleared between August 2025 and July 2026, the lowest annual figure since 1988 where satellite monitoring began.

=== Estimated loss by year [the values for years 2020 - 2025 are missing in the source] ===
Period	Estimated remaining forest cover in the Brazilian Amazon (km^{2})	Annual forest loss (km^{2})	Percent of 1970 cover remaining	Total forest loss (km^{2})
Pre–1970	4,100,001	—	—	—
1977	3,955,870	21,130	96.5%	144,130
1978–1987	3,744,570	211,300	91.3%	355,430
1988	3,723,520	21,050	90.8%	376,480
1989	3,705,750	17,770	90.4%	394,250
1990	3,692,020	13,730	90.0%	407,980
1991	3,680,990	11,030	89.8%	419,010
1992	3,667,204	13,786	89.4%	432,796
1993	3,652,308	14,896	89.1%	447,692
1994	3,637,412	14,896	88.7%	462,588
1995	3,608,353	29,059	88.0%	491,647
1996	3,590,192	18,161	87.6%	509,808
1997	3,576,965	13,227	87.2%	523,035
1998	3,559,582	17,383	86.8%	540,418
1999	3,542,323	17,259	86.4%	557,677
2000	3,524,097	18,226	86.0%	575,903
2001	3,505,932	18,165	85.5%	594,068
2002	3,484,281	21,651	85.0%	615,719
2003	3,458,885	25,396	84.4%	641,115
2004	3,431,113	27,772	83.7%	668,887
2005	3,412,099	19,014	83.2%	687,901
2006	3,397,814	14,285	82.9%	702,186
2007	3,386,163	11,651	82.6%	713,837
2008	3,373,252	12,911	82.3%	726,748
2009	3,365,788	7,464	82.1%	734,212
2010	3,358,788	7,000	81.9%	741,212
2011	3,352,370	6,418	81.8%	747,630
2012	3,347,799	4,571	81.7%	752,201
2013	3,341,908	5,891	81.5%	758,092
2014	3,336,896	5,012	81.4%	763,104
2015	3,330,689	6,207	81.2%	769,311
2016	3,322,796	7,893	81.0%	777,204
2017	3,315,849	6,947	80.9%	784,151
2018	3,308,313	7,536	80.7%	791,687
2019	3,298,551	9,762	80.5%	801,449
2020	3,290,125^{†}	8,426	80.2%	809,875
2021	3,279,649	10,476	80.0%	820,351
2022	3,268,049	11,600	79.7%	831,951
2023	3,260,097	7,952	79.5%	839,903
2024	3,253,809	6,288	79.4%	846,191
2025	3,248,545	5,264	79.2%	851,455

^{†}Value calculated from estimated forest loss, not directly known.

== Impacts ==
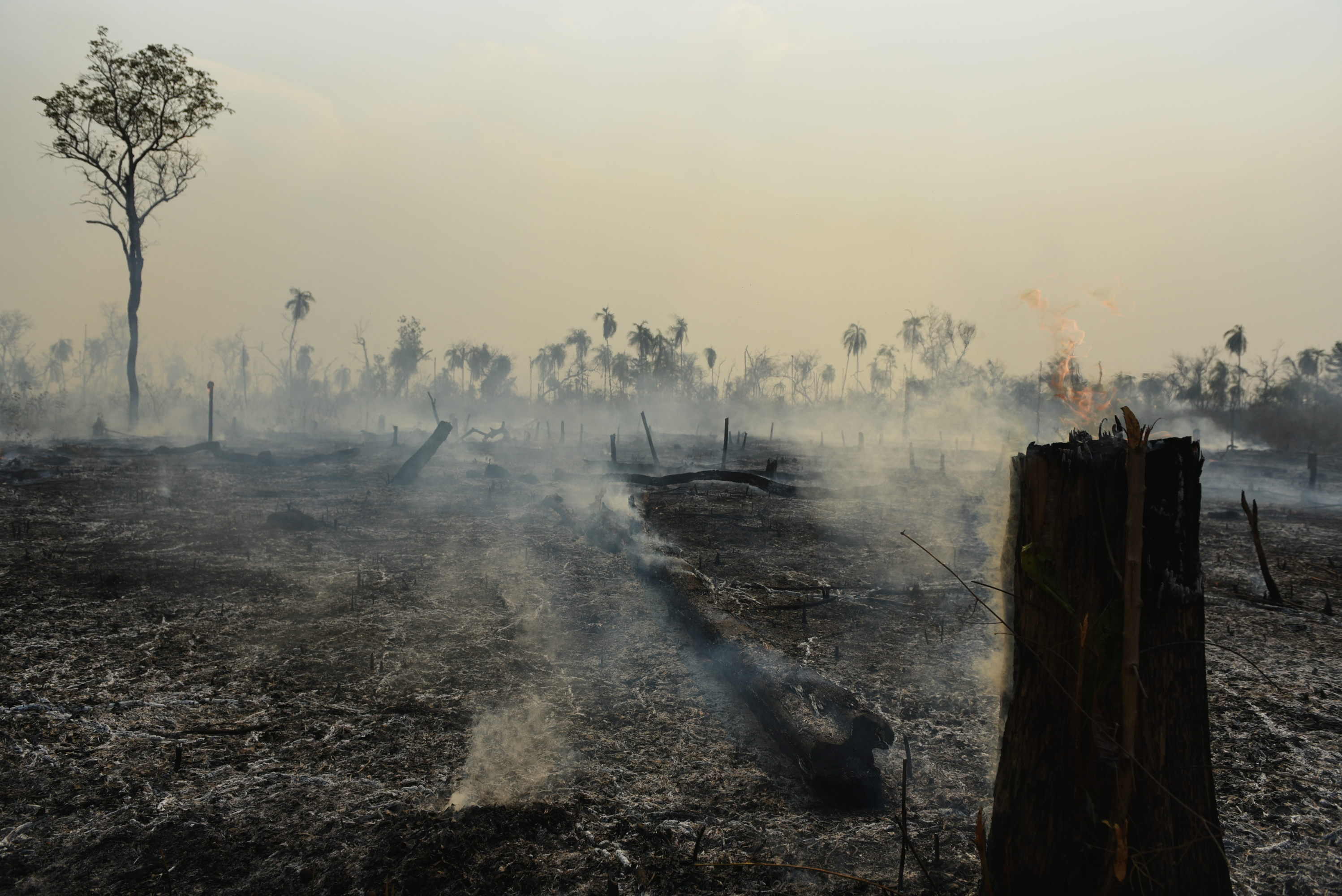
Amazon rainforest fire in Brazil's indigenous territory in 2017

Deforestation and biodiversity loss in the Amazon rainforest have resulted in significant risks of irreversible changes. Modeling studies have suggested that deforestation may be approaching a critical "tipping point" where large-scale "savannization" or desertification could occur, leading to catastrophic consequences for the global climate. This tipping point could trigger a self-perpetuating collapse of biodiversity and ecosystems in the region. Failing to prevent this tipping point could have severe impacts on the economy, natural capital, and ecosystem services. A study published in Nature Climate Change in 2022 provided empirical evidence that more than three-quarters of the Amazon rainforest has experienced a decline in resilience since the early 2000s, posing risks of dieback that would impact biodiversity, carbon storage, and climate change.

To maintain a high level of biodiversity, research suggests that a threshold of 40% forest cover in the Amazon should be maintained.

=== Impact on global warming ===
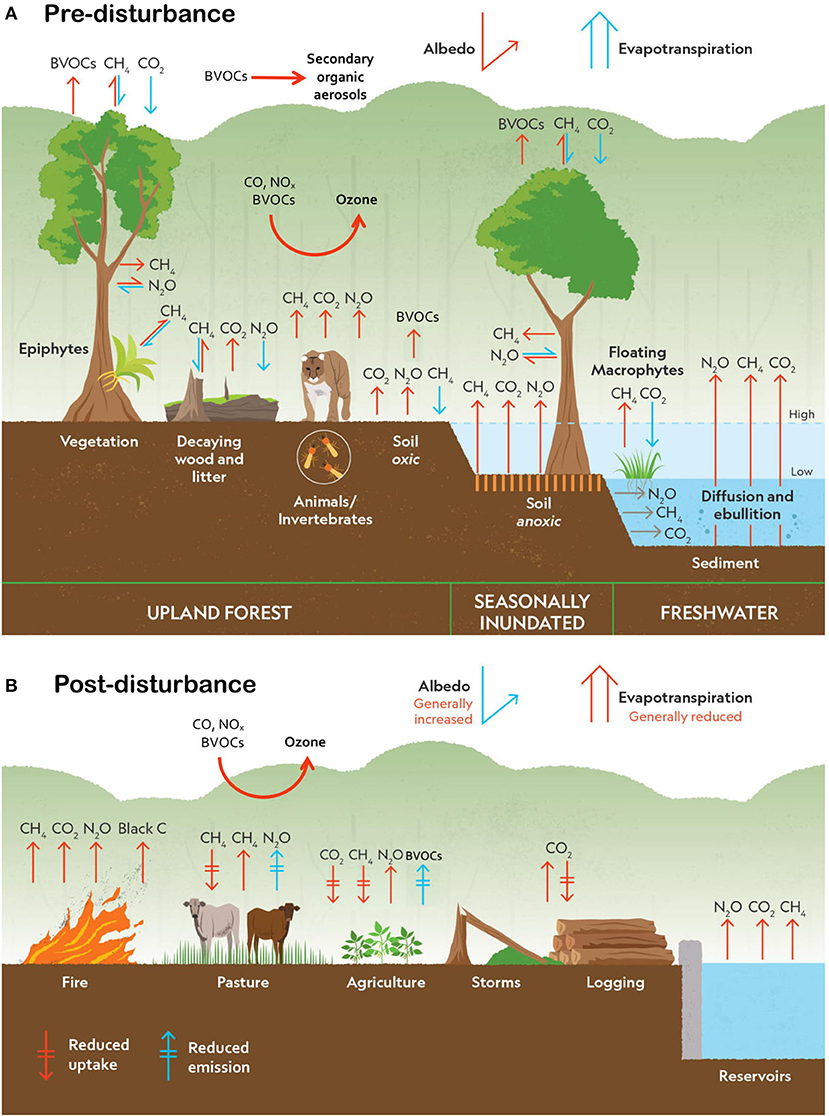
Climate change disturbances of rainforests.

Deforestation, along with other forms of ecosystem destruction such as peatbog degradation, can have multiple effects. It can reduce the carbon sink capacity of the land and contribute to increased emissions through factors like wildfires, land-use change, and reduced ecosystem health. These impacts can disrupt the normal carbon-absorbing processes of ecosystems, leading to stress and imbalance.

Historically, the Amazon Basin has played a significant role as a carbon sink, absorbing approximately 25% of the carbon captured by terrestrial land.

However, a scientific review article published in 2021 indicates that current evidence suggests the Amazon basin is currently emitting more greenhouse gases than it absorbs overall. This shift is attributed to climate change impacts and human activities in the region, particularly wildfires, current land-use practices, and deforestation. These factors contribute to the release of forcing agents that are likely to result in a net warming effect. Warming temperatures and changing weather patterns also lead to physiological responses in the forest, further hindering the absorption of CO_{2}.

According to a research led by Elena Shevliakova and Stephen Pacala complete deforestation of the Amazon will cause a global temperature rise of 0.25 degrees. In 2023, despite deforestation, the forest still held more than 150 billion metric tons of carbon.

=== Impacts on water supply ===
The deforestation of the Amazon rainforest has had a significant impact on Brazil's freshwater supply, particularly affecting the agricultural industry, which has been involved in clearing the forests. In 2005, certain regions of the Amazon basin experienced the most severe drought in over a century. This can be attributed to two key factors:

1. The rainforest plays a crucial role in contributing to rainfall across Brazil, even in distant areas. Deforestation has exacerbated the effects of droughts in 2005, 2010, and 2015–2016.

2. The rainforest contributes to rainfall and facilitates water storage, which in turn provides freshwater to the rivers that supply Brazil and other countries with water.

=== Impact on local temperature ===
In 2019, a group of scientists conducted research indicating that under a "business as usual" scenario, the deforestation of the Amazon rainforest will lead to a temperature increase of 1.45 degrees in Brazil. They stated that this temperature rise could have various consequences, including increased human mortality rates and electricity demands, reduced agricultural yields and water resources, and the potential collapse of biodiversity, especially in tropical regions. Additionally, local warming may cause shifts in species distributions, including those involved in the transmission of infectious disease. The authors of the paper assert that deforestation is already contributing to the observed temperature rise.

According to other research, complete Amazon deforestation will render the region itself (including 7 million square kilometers, 9 states in Brazil and 8 other countries) more or less uninhabitable as the temperature will rise by more than 4.5 degrees and rainfall will be reduced by a quart.

=== Impact on indigenous people ===
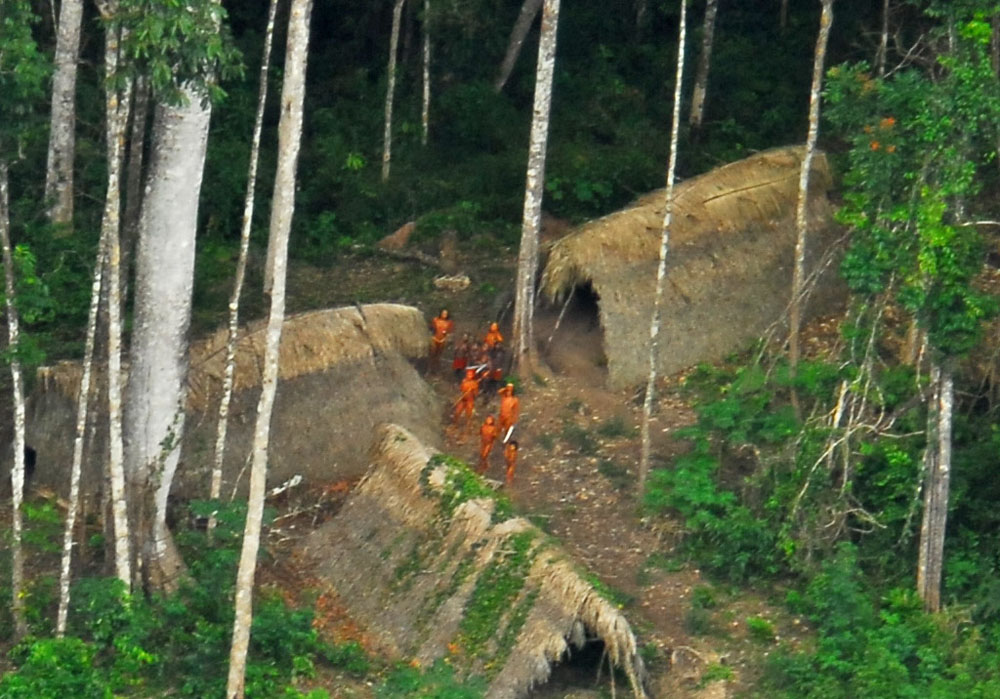
Members of an uncontacted tribe encountered in the Brazilian state of Acre in 2009

More than one-third of the Amazon forest is designated as Indigenous territory, encompassing over 4,466 formally recognized territories. Until 2015, approximately 8% of deforestation in the Amazon occurred within forests inhabited by indigenous peoples, while 88% occurred in areas outside of indigenous territories and protected areas, despite these areas comprising less than 50% of the total Amazon region. Indigenous communities have historically relied on the forest for sustenance, shelter, water, materials, fuel, and medicinal resources. The forest holds significant cultural and spiritual importance for them. Consequently, deforestation rates tend to be lower within Indigenous Territories, even though pressures to clear land for other purposes persist.

During the deforestation of the Amazon, native tribes have often faced mistreatment and abuse. Encroachments by loggers onto indigenous lands have led to conflicts resulting in fatalities. Some uncontacted indigenous groups have emerged from the forests and interacted with mainstream society due to threats from outsiders. When uncontacted tribes come into contact with outsiders, they are vulnerable to diseases against which they have little immunity. As a result, entire tribes can be severely impacted by epidemics, leading to significant population declines within a few years.

A long-standing struggle has taken place over the control of indigenous territories in the Amazon, primarily involving the Brazilian government. The demand for these lands has stemmed, in part, from the aim of enhancing Brazil's economic standing. Various individuals, including ranchers and land speculators from the southeast, have sought to claim these lands for personal financial gain. In early 2019, Brazil's newly elected president, Jair Bolsonaro, issued an executive order empowering the agriculture ministry to regulate the land occupied by indigenous tribes in the Amazon.

In the past, mining operations were permitted within the territory of an isolated indigenous group called the Yanomami. The conditions endured by these indigenous peoples resulted in many health issues, including tuberculosis. If their lands are utilized for further development, numerous tribal communities will be forcibly displaced, potentially leading to the loss of lives. In addition to the mistreatment of indigenous peoples, the exploitation of the forest itself will result in the depletion of vital resources necessary for their daily lives.

Research conducted in the Peruvian Amazon demonstrates that legal titling of indigenous lands significantly reduces deforestation rates. Land titling initiatives led to a 75% reduction in deforestation over two years. Such policies provide indigenous communities with the legal authority to protect their land from encroachment and exploitation, creating a powerful tool for combating deforestation in the Amazon.

Between 2013 and 2021, deforestation within indigenous territories in the Brazilian Amazon increased by 129%, primarily driven by illegal mining activities, activities which threaten biodiversity and undermine the cultural and environmental integrity of these lands. Due to the relaxation of environmental policies and protections in Brazil in the second half of the 2010s, the deforestation rate in indigenous territories was 195% higher between 2019 and 2021 than it was in the previous six years. Additionally, 59% of measured carbon emissions within indigenous territories between 2013 and 2021 took place in the final three years of the study.

The Yanomami people in Brazil have faced severe challenges due to illegal gold mining in their territories. Mining activities have led to deforestation, water contamination, and a surge in malaria cases among the Yanomami. President Lula's administration has taken steps to address these issues, including efforts to reclaim and protect Yanomami lands. In 2012, the Yanomami organization HORONAMI expressed their concerns, stating, "Illegal miners persist in destroying our lands, and the government must act urgently to stop these abuses and investigate the harm being done in the Upper Ocamo region". In 2020, a report from Mongabay quoted the Yanomami leaders expressing frustration with Brazilian authorities, stating, "We feel utterly abandoned; the government turns a blind eye to the illegal activities that poison our rivers and bring disease to our people".

Dario Kopenawa, vice president of the Hutukara Yanomami Association, has emphasized the importance of government intervention, stating, "The Brazilian government must fulfil its protective role, where every Brazilian citizen, not just the Yanomami, feels protected. It is not a favour, but a constitutional obligation. It is necessary to curb the mining projects on indigenous lands because they are illegal under Brazilian law."

Recent government raids targeting illegal gold mining in the Yanomami Indigenous Territory have revealed the extreme extent of deforestation caused by these activities. Using machine learning algorithms and satellite imagery, researchers estimate that over 2,000 hectares of forest have been deforested due to gold mining since 2019, with 67% of this deforestation (approximately 1,350 hectares) occurring in 2022 alone. The deforestation is widespread, affecting areas along the Uraricoera, Parima, and Mucajai Rivers.

== Efforts to stop and reverse deforestation ==
Norwegian Prime Minister Jens Stoltenberg announced on September 16, 2008, that the Norwegian government would contribute a donation of US$1 billion to the newly established Amazon Fund. The funds from this initiative would be allocated to projects aimed at mitigating the deforestation of the Amazon rainforest.

In September 2015, Brazilian President Dilma Rousseff addressed the United Nations, reporting that Brazil had effectively reduced the deforestation rate in the Amazon by 82%. She also outlined Brazil's goals for the next 15 years, which included eliminating illegal deforestation, restoring and reforesting an area of 120,000 km^{2} (46,000 sq mi), and rehabilitating 150,000 km^{2} (58,000 sq mi) of degraded pastures.

In August 2017, Brazilian President Michel Temer revoked the protected status of an Amazonian nature reserve, which spanned an area equivalent to Denmark in the northern states of Pará and Amapá.

In April 2019, an Ecuadorian court issued an order to cease oil exploration activities in an area of 1,800 square kilometers (690 sq mi) within the Amazon rainforest.

In May 2019, eight former environment ministers in Brazil expressed concerns about escalating deforestation in the Amazon during Jair Bolsonaro's first year as president. Carlos Nobre, an expert on the Amazon and climate change, warned in September 2019 that if deforestation rates continued at their current pace, the Amazon forest could reach a tipping point within 20 to 30 years, potentially resulting in large portions of the forest transforming into a dry savanna, particularly in the southern and northern regions.

Bolsonaro has rebuffed European politicians' attempts to intervene in the matter of Amazon rainforest deforestation, citing it as Brazil's internal affairs. He has advocated for the opening of more areas, including those in the Amazon, for mining activities and mentioned discussions with US President Donald Trump about a joint development program for the Brazilian Amazon region.

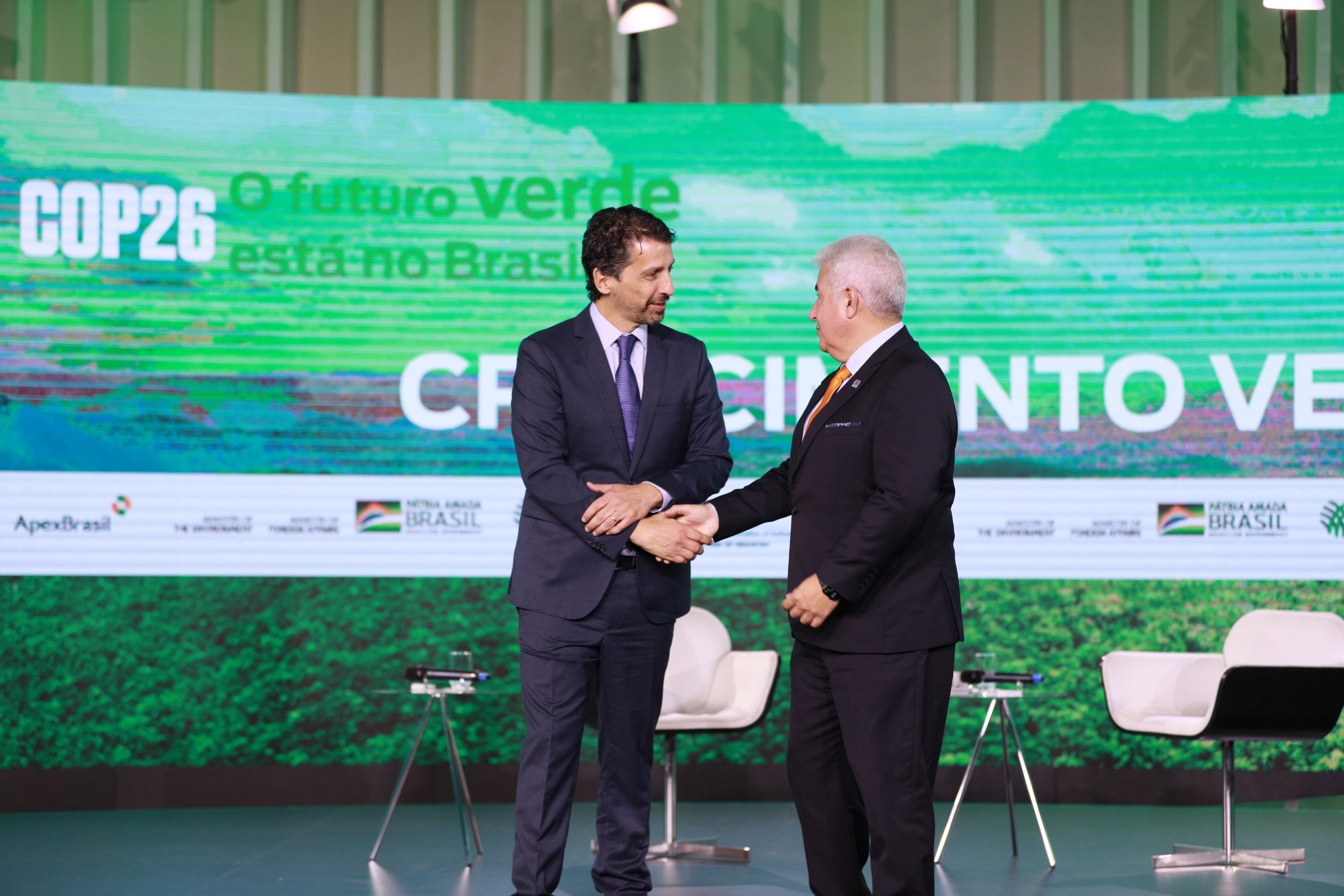
Brazil promised to halt and reverse deforestation by 2030.

Brazilian Economy Minister Paulo Guedes has expressed the belief that other countries should compensate Brazil for the oxygen produced within its borders but used elsewhere.

In late August 2019, following an international outcry and warnings from experts about the escalating fires, the Brazilian government, led by Jair Bolsonaro, implemented measures to combat the fires. These measures included a 60-day ban on forest clearance using fires, deploying 44,000 soldiers to fight the fires, receiving four planes from Chile for firefighting purposes, accepting a $12 million aid package from the UK government, and softening his stance on aid from the G7. Bolsonaro also called for a Latin American conference to address the preservation of the Amazon.

On November 2, 2021, during the COP26 climate summit, over 100 countries, representing approximately 85% of the world's forests, reached a significant agreement to end deforestation by 2030. This agreement, an improvement on the 2014 New York Declaration on Forests, which initially aimed to reduce deforestation by 50% by 2020 and end it by 2030, now includes Brazil as a signatory. It is worth noting that deforestation increased during the 2014–2020 period despite the previous agreement.

In August 2023, Brazilian President Luiz Inácio Lula da Silva hosted a summit in Belem with eight South American countries to coordinate policies for the Amazon basin and develop a roadmap to save the world's largest rainforest, also serving as a preparatory event for the COP30 UN climate talks in 2025.

In the first 8 months of 2023 deforestation rate in the Brazilian Amazon declined by 48%, that prevented the release of 196 million tons CO_{2} to the atmosphere. Financing from the Amazon Fund and cooperation between the Amazonian nations played a significant role in it. In the first 9 months of 2023 deforestation rate declined by 49.5% despite the worst drought in the last 40 years. Wildfires in September 2023 declined by 36% in comparison to September 2022. Switzerland and United States gave 8.4 million dollars to the Amazon fund for preventing deforestation.

According to Amazon Conservation's MAAP forest monitoring program, the deforestation rate in the Amazon rainforest as a whole from the 1 of January to the 8 of November 2023, in comparison to the same period in 2022, declined by 55.8%. This trend gives hope to Amazon. Deforestation reduction in Brazil (59%) which is the main cause of the trend is probably due to Lula's environmental policy. In Columbia, the rate of deforestation fell by 66.5% probably due to the policies of Gustavo Petro and a change in the policies of former guerrilla fighters that control part of the forest. It is not clear, still, what caused the decline in Bolivia (60%) and Peru (37%). Bolivia has a relatively high forest loss rate due to wildfires, but those are not occurring in the Amazon.

In September 2024, Sawré Muybu, an indigenous land, belonging to the Munduruku people got an official recognition, which is considered as a significant step in fighting deforestation. However, 44 more territories still wait for recognition.

=== Cost of rainforest conservation ===
According to the Woods Hole Research Institute (WHRC) in 2008, it was estimated that halting deforestation in the Brazilian rainforest would require an annual investment of US$100–600 million. A more recent study in 2022 suggested that the conservation of approximately 80% of the Brazilian rainforest remains achievable, with an estimated annual cost of US$1.7–2.8 billion to conserve an area of 3.5 million km^{2}. By preventing deforestation, it would be possible to avoid carbon emissions at a cost of US$1.33 per ton of CO_{2}, which is substantially lower compared to the cost of reducing emissions through renewable fuel subsidies (US$100 per ton) or weatherization assistance programs such as building insulation (US$350/ton).

== Future of the Amazon rainforest ==
Based on the deforestation rates observed in 2005, projections indicated that the Amazon rainforest would experience a 40% reduction within two decades. While the rate of deforestation has slowed since the early 2000s, the forest continues to shrink annually, and satellite data analysis reveals a significant increase in deforestation since 2018.

== See also ==
- 2019 Brazil wildfires
- Belo Monte Dam
- Cattle ranching
- Clearcutting
- Construction of the Trans-Amazonian Highway
- Deforestation
- Deforestation in Brazil
- Flying river
- Livestock's Long Shadow
- Logging
- IBAMA
- INCRA
- Mennonites#Environmental impacts - Mennonite colonization has been identified as a driver of deforestation
- Population and energy consumption in Brazilian Amazonia
- Risks of using unsustainable agricultural practices in rainforests
- Selective logging in the Amazon rainforest
- Terra preta
- Non-timber forest products
- Orinoco Mining Arc

=== Fauna ===
- Panthera onca onca
- Peruvian jaguar
- Southern jaguar

== Bibliography ==
- Bradford, Alina. "Deforestation: Facts, Causes, & Effects." Live Science. Deforestation: Facts, Causes & Effects. March 4, 2015. Web. July 16, 2017.
- Monbiot, George (1991). Amazon watershed: the new environmental investigation. London, UK: Michael Joseph. ISBN 978-0-7181-3428-0.
- Scheer, Roddy, and Moss, Doug. "Deforestation and its Extreme Effects on Global Warming." Scientific America. Deforestation and Its Extreme Effect on Global Warming. 2017. Web. July 16, 2017.
- Schleifer, Philip (2023). "Global Shifts: Business, Politics, and Deforestation in a Changing World Economy". Cambridge MA / USA: MIT Press (open access). ISBN 978-0-262-37443-9.
- Tabuchi, Hiroko, Rigby, Claire, and White, Jeremy. "Amazon Deforestation, Once Tamed, now Comes Roaring Back." The New York Times. Amazon Deforestation, Once Tamed, Comes Roaring Back. Feb 24, 2017. Web. July 16, 2017.
