= Nasrani =

Nasrani may refer to:

- Saint Thomas Christians or Nasrani, an ancient community of Christians from Kerala, India
- Syriac term for Christians, predominantly used in Kerala and Near East Asia
- Nasrani (Arabic term for Christian), cognate with Nazarene in English
- Nasrani (film), a 2007 Indian Malayalam-language

== See also ==
- Nazarene (disambiguation)
- Ras Nasrani, a bay at Sharm El Sheikh
