= Nazarene =

Nazarene may refer to:

- A person from Nazareth

== Religion ==
- Nazarene (sect), a term used for an early Christian sect in first-century Judaism, Nasoraean Mandaeans, and later a sect of Jewish Christians
- Nazarene (title), used to describe people from Nazareth in the New Testament, and a title applied to Jesus
- Nazareno (Spanish confraternity), groups of people who perform elaborate Holy Week processions in Spain
- Apostolic Christian Church (Nazarene), a Christian denomination of the Anabaptist movement
- Church of the Nazarene, a Wesleyan evangelical Christian denomination
- Nazarene fellowship, offshoot from Christadelphians 1873–1881

== Other uses ==
- Nazarene movement, a group of early 19th-century German Romantic painters
- The Nazarene, a 1939 novel by Sholem Asch
- Nazarene, a ship wrecked in 1957

== See also ==
- Nasrani (disambiguation), Nazarene in Arabic
- Nazareth (disambiguation)
- Nazarene University (disambiguation)
- List of Church of the Nazarene schools
- Nazirite, one who voluntarily took a vow described in Numbers 6:1–21 in the bible
- Nasranis, or Saint Thomas Christians, an ethnoreligious group from Kerala, India
- Black Nazarene, a statue of Christ venerated in the Philippines
- Impaled Nazarene, a Finnish metal band
- Nazari, Persian surname meaning "son of Nazareth"
