= Flying river =

Water vapor transfer from the Amazon Basin

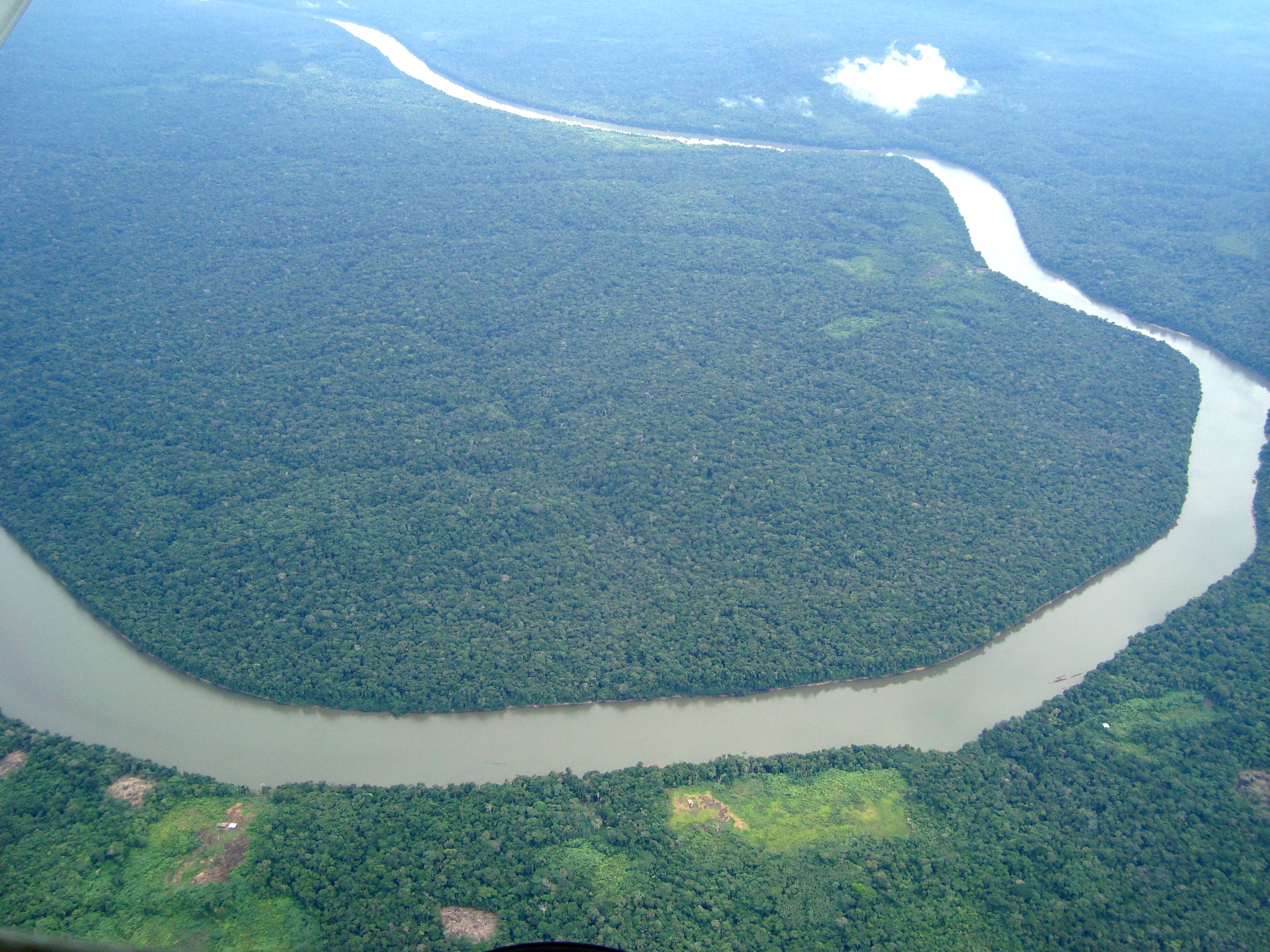
Aerial view of the Amazon rainforest

The flying river is a movement of large quantities of water vapor transported in the atmosphere from the Amazon Basin to other parts of South America, and the world. The forest trees release water vapor into the atmosphere through transpiration and this moisture is deposited in other localities in the form of precipitation, forming a virtual river.

== Concept ==
An average forest tree will release 1000 litres (220 imp gal; 264 US gal) of water vapor into the atmosphere every day. It has been found that whereas every square metre of the surface of the sea evaporates one litre of water each day, the same area of forest evaporates about eight times as much because of the multiple layers of foliage in the crown of the trees. The main airflow in the Amazon basin is towards the southwest. When this air mass reaches the Andes, the mountain range acts as a "natural barrier", redirecting huge volumes of humid air towards the Amazon regions of Colombia, Ecuador, north and south of Peru, central and southern Brazil as well as towards northern Argentina, Paraguay, and Uruguay, and rain falls in these areas. Some part of this air manages to surmount the cordillera and deposits rain in the west of Peru. Other air masses travel northwards from the Amazon basin, passing over Colombia, Venezuela, Guyana, French Guiana, and Suriname.

== Climatic consequences of deforestation ==
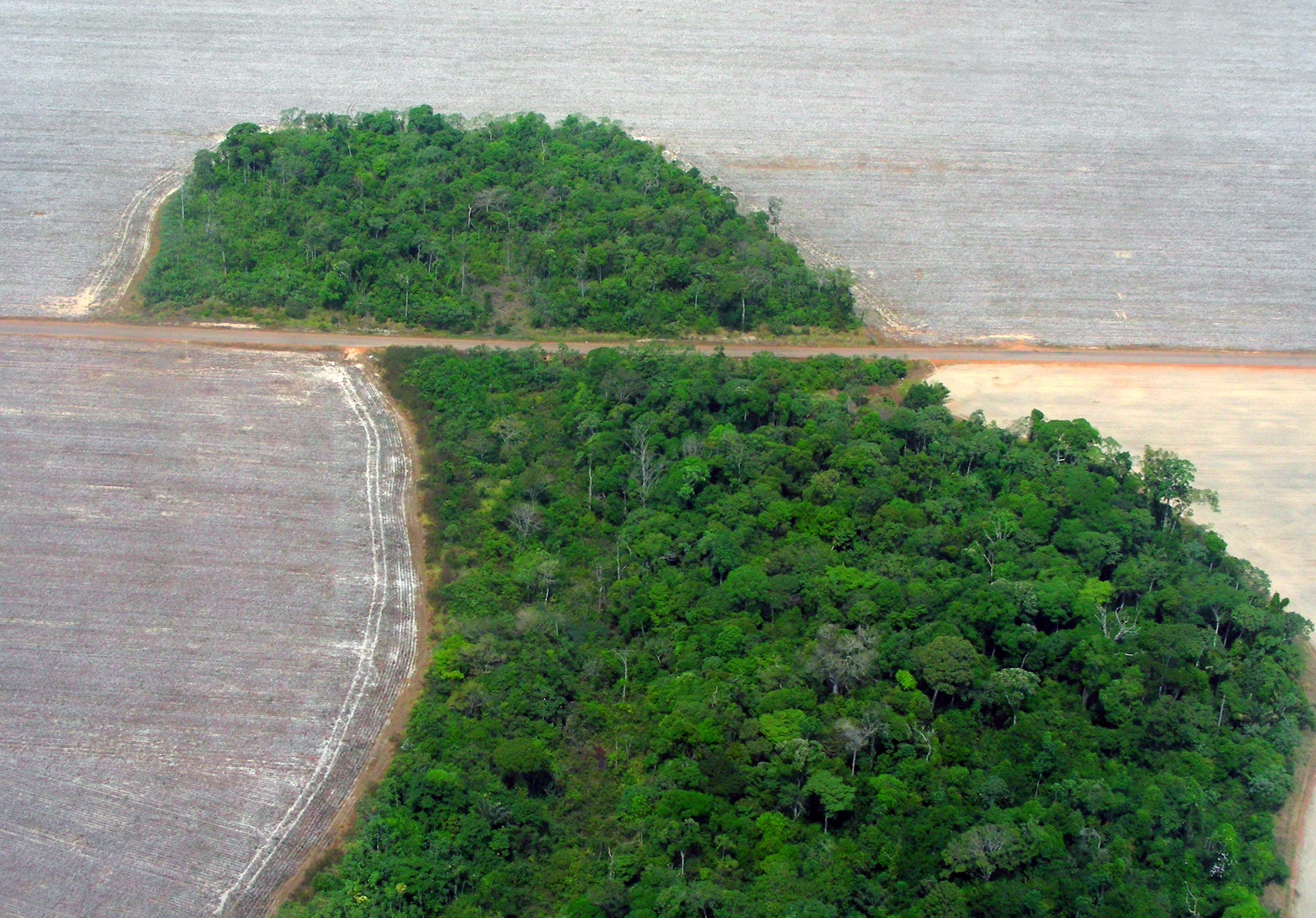
Deforestation in Mato Grosso state

In 2009 Antonio Nobre, a Brazilian climate scientist, stated that without the flying river, much of southern Brazil, which produces approximately 70% of the country's GNP, would be arid desert. Clearing the Amazon forest for logging and agriculture is likely to result in lower yields elsewhere. Smoke from the fires set by some farmers to clear land sends particles into the atmosphere, resulting in diminished precipitation, which in turn leaves the trees, which have evolved in wet conditions, vulnerable to fire. The drought in southern Brazil in 2010 is believed to be due to the drying up of the flying rivers, and the even worse 2014-5 drought is also attributed to this.

== Flying Rivers Project ==
With its large surface area and abundant rainfall, Brazil receives more rain in a year (estimated at 15,000 cubic kilometres (3,600 cu mi)) than any other country. In 2007, the Swiss-Brazilian pilot Gérard Moss joined with scientists to initiate a project to evaluate the source of the atmospheric water over Brazil and examine the possibility that recent droughts in the country are being caused by the deforestation of the Amazon rainforest. This is the Flying Rivers Project. The primary objective of the project is to "try to ascertain the origin of the water vapour, rainwater and river water in the areas crossed by the flying rivers". Other objectives are to scientifically evaluate the processes involved in this water transfer and to educate the public in understanding the importance of the Amazon rainforest as a source of the water that is vital for their lives and the economy.
