= Nazareth (surname) =

Nazareth is a surname. Notable people with the surname include:

- Annette Nazareth (born 1956), an American attorney
- Daniel Nazareth (1948–2014), Indian composer and conductor
- Ernesto Nazareth (1863–1934), Brazilian composer and pianist
- H. O. Nazareth (born 1944), British film maker, journalist and barrister
- Marco Antonio Nazareth (1986–2009), Mexican boxer
- Oswald Bruno Nazareth (died 1998), Pakistani teacher
- Peter Nazareth (born 1940), Ugandan writer

== See also ==
- Nazaret (name)
- Nazareth (disambiguation)
- Nazareth
