= Nazareno (surname) =

Nazareno is a surname. Notable people with the surname include:

- Francisco Nazareno (born 1993), an Ecuadorian footballer
- Franklin Nazareno (born 1987), an Ecuadorian sprinter
- Geovanny Nazareno (born 1988), an Ecuadorian footballer
- Leonel Nazareno (born 1994), an Ecuadorian football player
- Jose Nazareno (born 1997), an Ecuadorian professional footballer
- Julio Nazareno (1936–2019), an Argentine jurist

== See also ==
- Nazareno (disambiguation)

Media related to Nazareno (surname) at Wikimedia Commons
