= Nazareth College =

Nazareth College may refer to:

== Australia ==
- Nazareth College, Melbourne
- Nazareth Catholic College, Adelaide

== Spain ==
- Nazareth College, Alicante

== United States ==
- Nazareth College (Kentucky), now Spalding University
- Nazareth College (Michigan)
- Nazareth University in New York, formerly Nazareth College

== See also ==
- Nazareth Academy (disambiguation)
- Collège Notre Dame de Nazareth, Beirut
