= Gérard Moss =

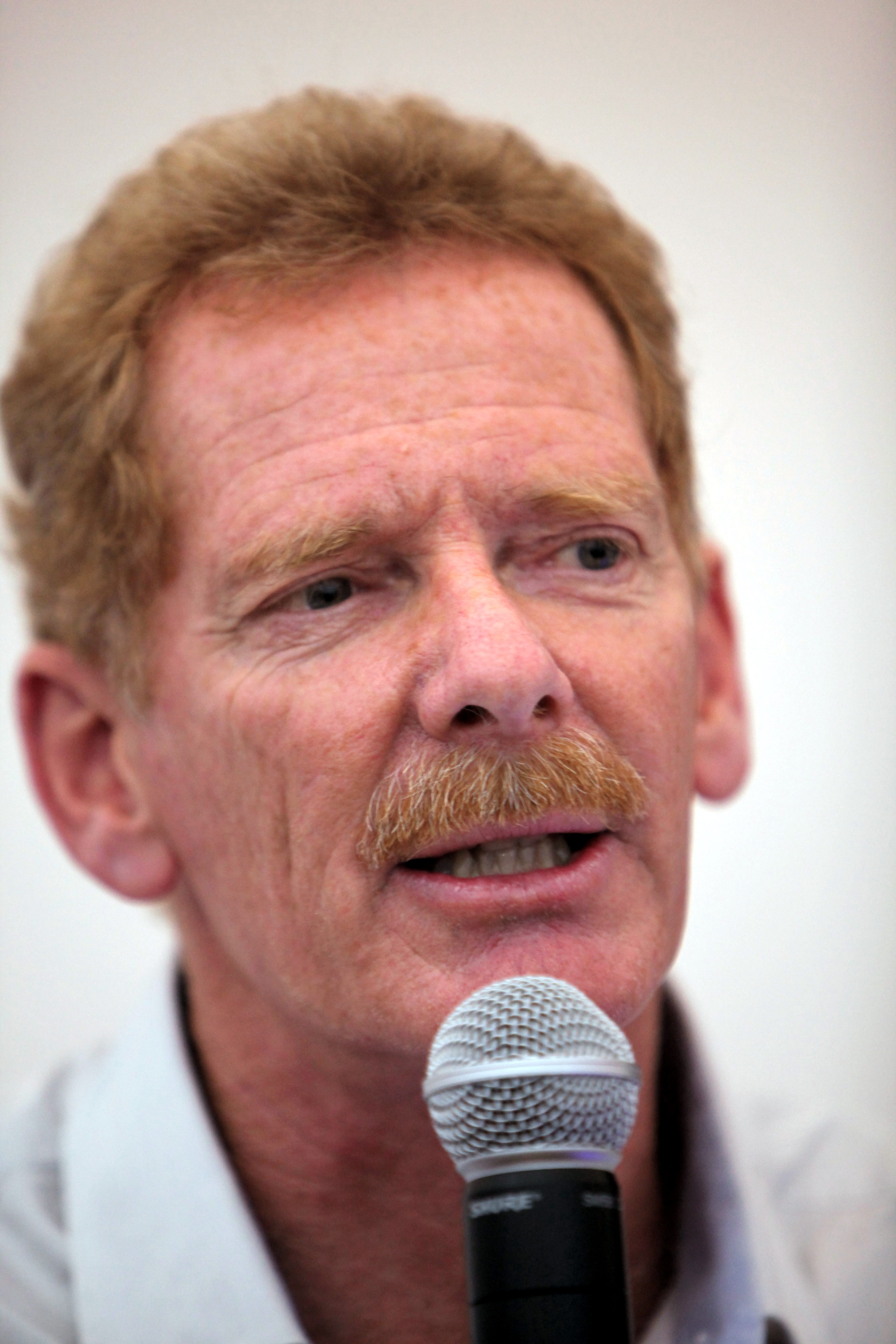
- Moss at the 6th World Water Forum in 2012
- Born: 16 May 1955 (age 71); England, UK
- Died: 16 March 2022
- Occupations: Pilot; environmentalist; explorer
- Years active: 1983–2022
- Spouse: Margi Moss
- Website: mundomoss.com.br

Gérard Moss, MBE (born 16 May 1955, died 16 March 2022) was a Swiss-Brazilian pilot, engineer, public speaker, environmentalist and explorer born in England. As a pilot, Gerard was known for being the first person to complete a solo flight in a motor glider around the world. Gérard and his wife Margi Moss are naturalized citizens of Brazil and until as late as 2012 were the only South American citizens considered Earthrounders.

As an environmentalist, Gerard and his wife have started many projects to prevent Deforestation in Brazil and evaluate the quality of its water and air. After living in Rio de Janeiro for 25 years, the couple moved to Brasília in 2006 to be closer to the Amazon rainforest and begin the Flying Rivers project.

== Early life and expeditions ==
The life of Gerard as an explorer started early. After getting his first passport at age 4, he would fly to England and Switzerland to visit his parents. In 1983, after graduating as a mechanical engineer, Gerard acquired his pilot license in California and arrived in Brazil, where he set up a maritime freight business to transport soybeans. In 1989, he completed his first round the world flight along with Margi, whom he met in Búzios in 1985.

=== Four corners of the Americas ===
In 1997 he flew to the four corners of the American continent. Starting in Rio de Janeiro, he flew to Cape Froward, Chile in the extreme south, then the extreme west on Cape Prince of Wales, Alaska followed by Zenith Point in Canada and finally Ponta dos Seixas back in Brazil. His expedition was covered by Rede Globo on Fantástico.

=== First motor glider flight around the world ===
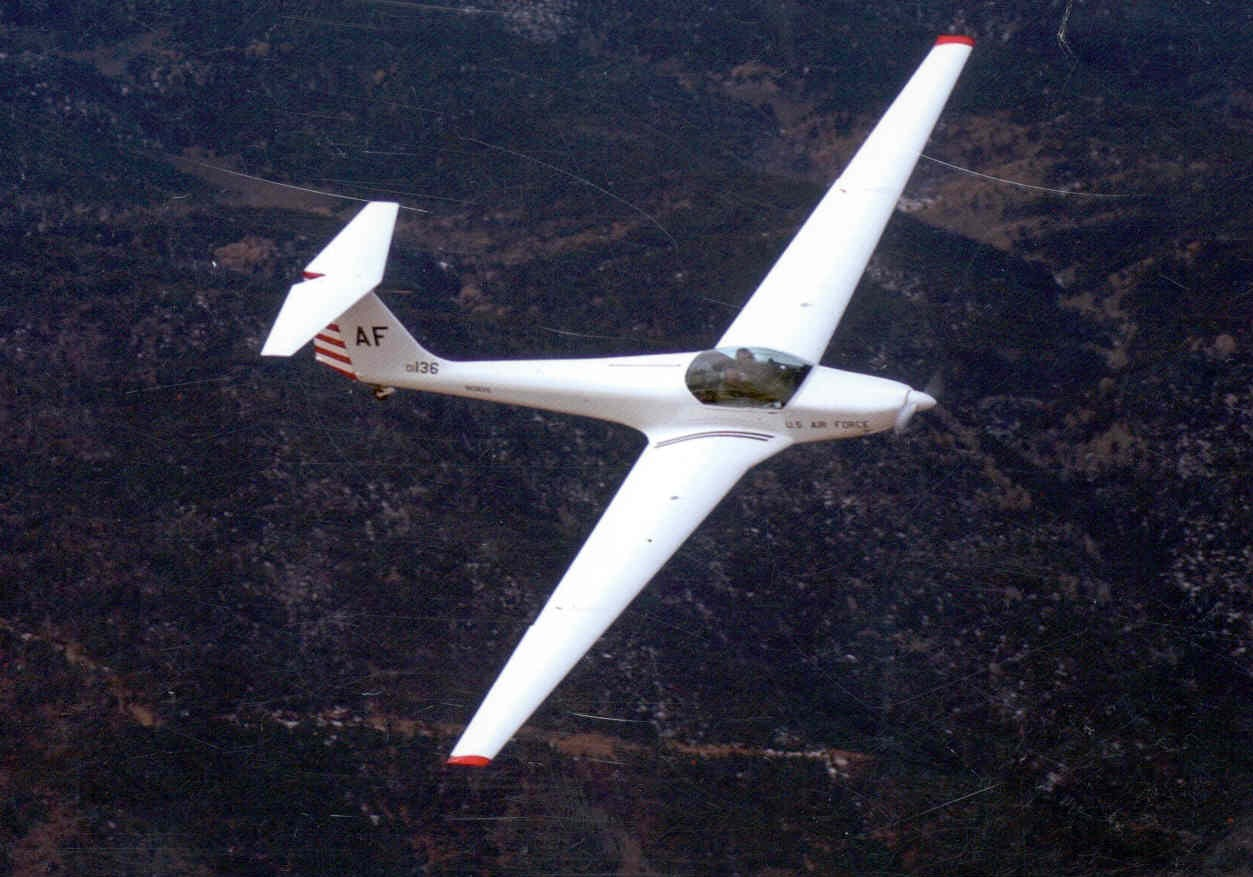
A Ximango motor glider similar to the one used by Moss

In 2001, he completed the first flight around the world in a motor glider, using the Ximango manufactured in Brazil. The aircraft has a near-handcrafted production and proved to be very efficient. The journey was planned to be completed in 100 days. His expedition was once again covered by Fantástico, a work that resulted in the book Asas Do Vento: A Primeira Volta Ao Mundo Num Motoplanador (Wings of the Wind: The First World Tour in a Motorglider).

=== Environmental projects ===
With the aid of his private flight experience, Moss was able to witness firsthand the effects of global warming and deforestation. His concerns grew into projects that aimed at conservation of Brazilian natural resources. His projects evaluated the quality of the air and the water in Brazil. In 2003 he started a project to analyze the waters of Brazilian drainage basins and later started the Flying Rivers project.

== Media relations ==
Gerard's expeditions have been covered by Fantástico on TV Globo and his projects have been covered by TV Câmara, National Geographic, Estadão, and several newspapers, magazines and websites, both Brazilian and foreign.

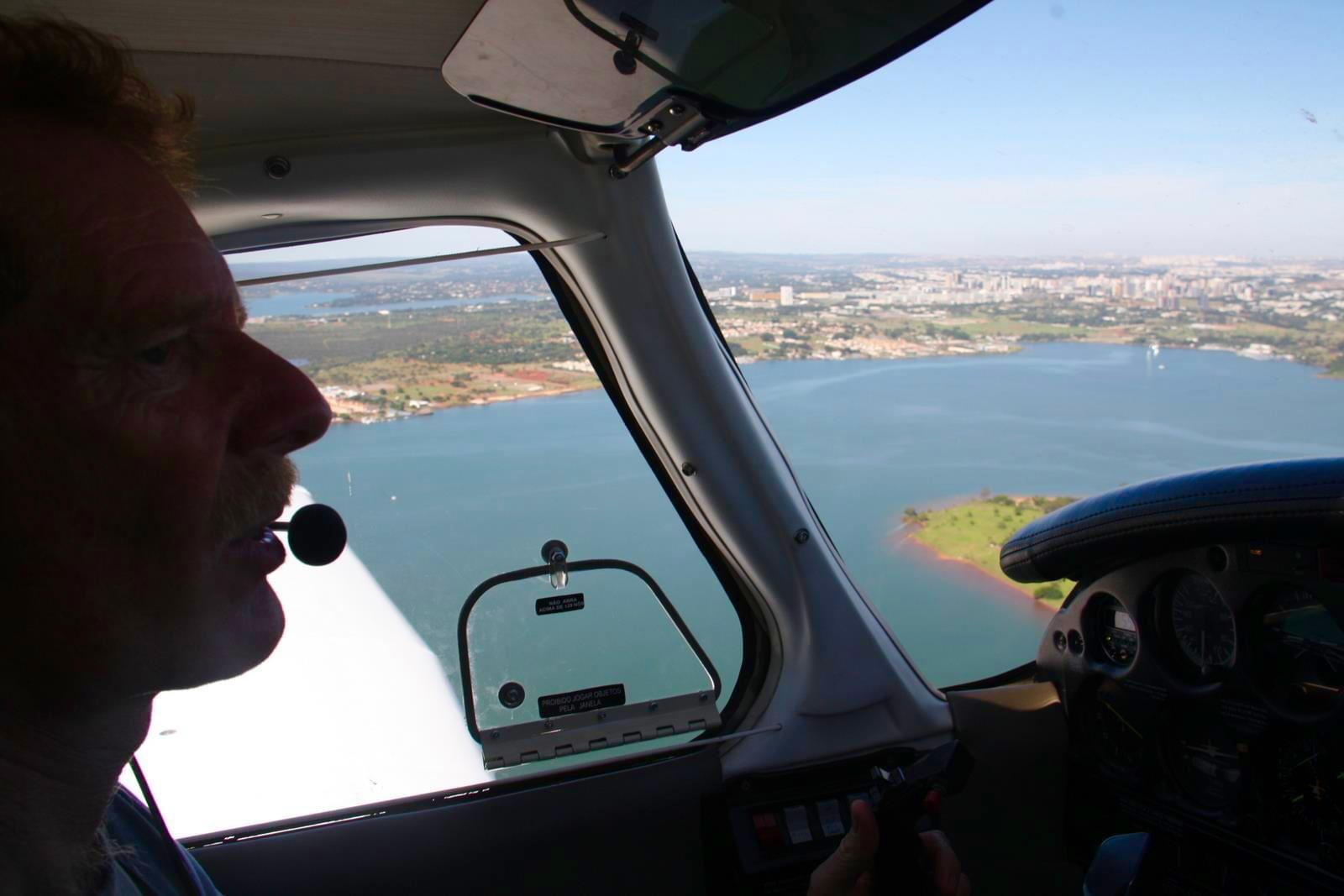
Gerard Moss aloft over Brasilia in his Embraer Sertanejo (PT-RXE ) nicknamed "Romeo" in which he flew around the world in 1989-1992

== Flying Rivers ==
In 2007, Gérard, together with renowned Brazilian scientists, started a research project to evaluate the water flow from clouds and the possibility of drought being caused by the deforestation of the Amazon Forest. The project consists of acquiring water from the air to evaluate its origin and flow from the Amazon River to the south of the Americas. The project is part of a larger project called "Brasil das Águas" (Brazil of the Waters). According to Moss, the water flow carried by these flying rivers could equal that of the Amazon River itself since each tree can be responsible for 300 liters of atmospheric water per day. Between 2006 and 2007, seven Brazilian rivers were the target of studies (Araguaia, Grande, Ribeira, Miranda, Ibicuí, Verde and Guaporé). In 2007, after collecting the samples, they started to compare them with the water vapors from the air. With the support of University of São Paulo and Federal University of Rio de Janeiro, they arrived at the conclusion that much of the water vapor comes from Amazonian rivers, creating a phenomenon termed "flying rivers".

== Publications ==
Gerard and Margi have published several books reporting their experiences:

- Asas Do Vento: A Primeira Volta Ao Mundo Num Motoplanador (ISBN 8501065552)
- Volta Por Cima (ISBN 8501055794)
- Freedom of the Skies (ISBN 1853109061)
- Loucos por ti, América (ISBN 8501055255)
- Extremos das Américas
