= Nazaré Paulista =

- Municipality
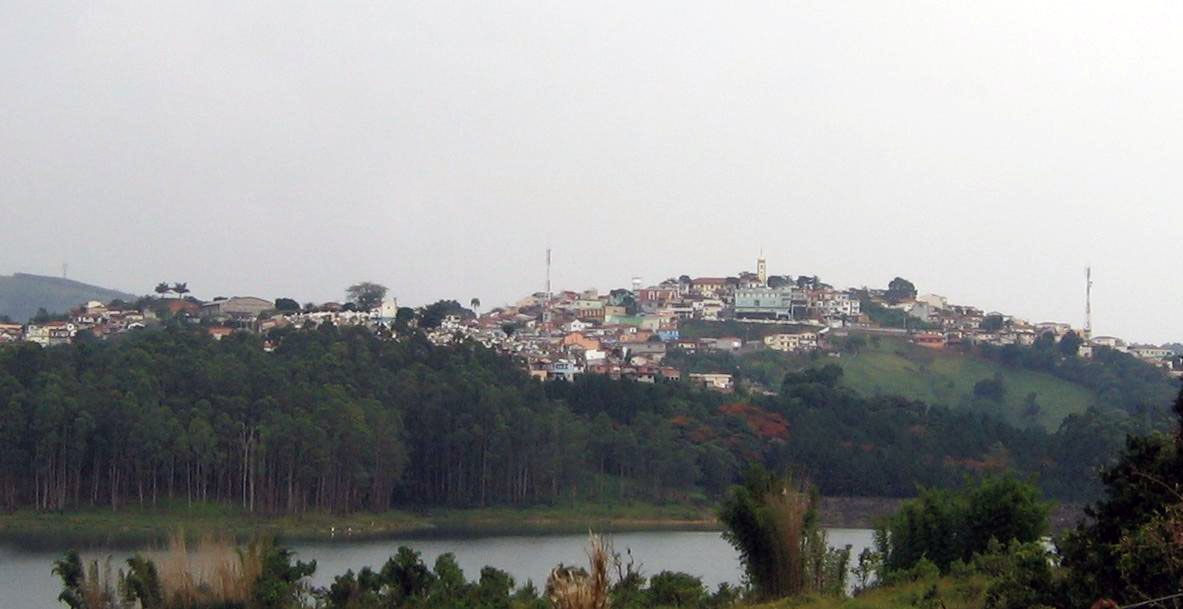

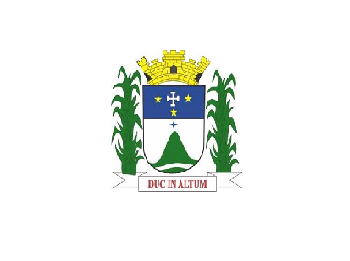
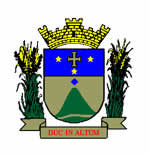
- Flag Coat of arms

- Location in São Paulo state

- Location in Brazil
- Coordinates: 23°10′51″S 46°23′42″W
- Country: Brazil
- Region: Southeast
- State: São Paulo

Area
  - Total: 326.3 km^{2} (126.0 sq mi)
- Elevation: 845 m (2,772 ft)

Population (2020)
  - Total: 18,698
  - Density: 57.30/km^{2} (148.4/sq mi)
- Time zone: UTC−3 (BRT)
- Website: nazarepaulista.sp.gov.br

Nazaré Paulista is a municipality in the state of São Paulo in Brazil. The population is 18,698 (2020 est.) in an area of 326.3 km^{2} (126.0 sq mi). It is within the Atlantic Forest biome and is a major source of water for the city of São Paulo, hosting the Atibainha reservoir of the Cantareira System. Nazaré Paulista is also home to the nationally known conservation organization, the Instituto de Pesquisas Ecológicas (Institute for Ecological Research).

== Media ==
In telecommunications, the city was served by Telecomunicações de São Paulo. In July 1998, this company was acquired by Telefónica, which adopted the Vivo brand in 2012. The company is currently an operator of cell phones, fixed lines, internet (fiber optics/4G) and television (satellite and cable).

== See also ==
- List of municipalities in São Paulo
