= Nazaré =

Nazaré is Portuguese for Nazareth.

Other meanings of Nazaré include:

== Places ==
=== In Brazil ===
- Nazaré, Bahia
- Nazaré (neighbourhood), in Salvador, Bahia
- Nazaré, Tocantins
- Nazaré Paulista, São Paulo

=== In Portugal ===
- Nazaré, Portugal, a Portuguese municipality in Oeste region and Leiria District, known as a popular surfing destination because of its high breaking waves

== Television ==
- Nazaré (TV series) a Portuguese telenovela starring Carolina Loureiro, first airing in 2019
