= Wahed Nazari =

Afghan film director (born 1953)

Wahed Nazari (born February 25, 1953 in Kabul) is an Afghan film director. He obtained a PhD as a director and in 1990 directed the noted Afghan film Arman which was based on 1978.

His other films include De lmar pa Loor, Afghanistan Bedone Shorawiha, and Da Konde Zoi.

He presently is the director of Radio Television Afghanistan (RTA).
