= Nazareth College, Alicante =

Spanish college

Coordinates: 38°21′35.65″N 0°29′57.2″W

- Colegio Nazaret Alicante
- Alicante, Spain

Information
- Type: Jesuit, Catholic
- Denomination: All faiths
- Established: 1957; 69 years ago
- Director: Leoncio Calvo Gómez
- Gender: Coeducational
- Other name: Center for Educational Action Singular (CAES)
- Founder: Francisco Javier Fontova
- Website: Nazareth College

Nazareth College, Alicante, is a Spanish college. It was initiated by the Society of Jesus in 1957 to tend to the educational and other needs of at-risk youth and their families in the community of Alicante, Spain.

== History ==
In September 1957, Jesuit Francisco Javier Fontova initiated Nazareth in response to the minors with problems of social marginalization in Alicante. He began by feeding 32 children, two of whom lived at the facility. The "Catholic Mothers" of the Marian Congregation helped with teaching the children.

By 1977, there were 190 boys aged 5 to 17 living in the boarding school, with 4 teachers.

== See also ==
- List of Jesuit sites
