= Nazareth Academy =

Nazareth Academy may refer to:

== India ==
- Nazareth Academy, Gaya

== United States ==
- Nazareth Academy (La Grange Park, Illinois)
- Nazareth Academy (Kentucky), now Spalding University
- Nazareth Academy (Wakefield, Massachusetts)
- Nazareth Academy (Rochester, New York)
- Nazareth Academy (Parma Heights, Ohio), of the Roman Catholic Diocese of Cleveland
- Nazareth Academy High School, Philadelphia, Pennsylvania

== See also ==
- Nazareth College (disambiguation)
