= Nazareth (Asunción) =

- Barrio
- Interactive map of Nazareth
- Country: Paraguay
- City: Asunción

Area
  - Total: 1.30 km^{2} (0.50 sq mi)
- Elevation: 43 m (141 ft)

Population
  - Total: 7,133

Nazareth is a neighbourhood (barrio) of Asunción, Paraguay. It is a relatively new neighborhood which arose from the need for an expansion of Asunción. Its origin dates back to the 1930s.

== Population ==
The neighbourhood Nazareth has a total of 7,133 inhabitants, 45.7% male and 54.3% female. The population density is approximately 5,780 people/km^{2}.

== Climate ==
Nazareth has a tropical climate. The average temperature is 28°C in the summer, and 19°C in the winter. The prevailing winds are North and South. The average annual rainfall is 1700 mm.
