= Sistema Cantareira =

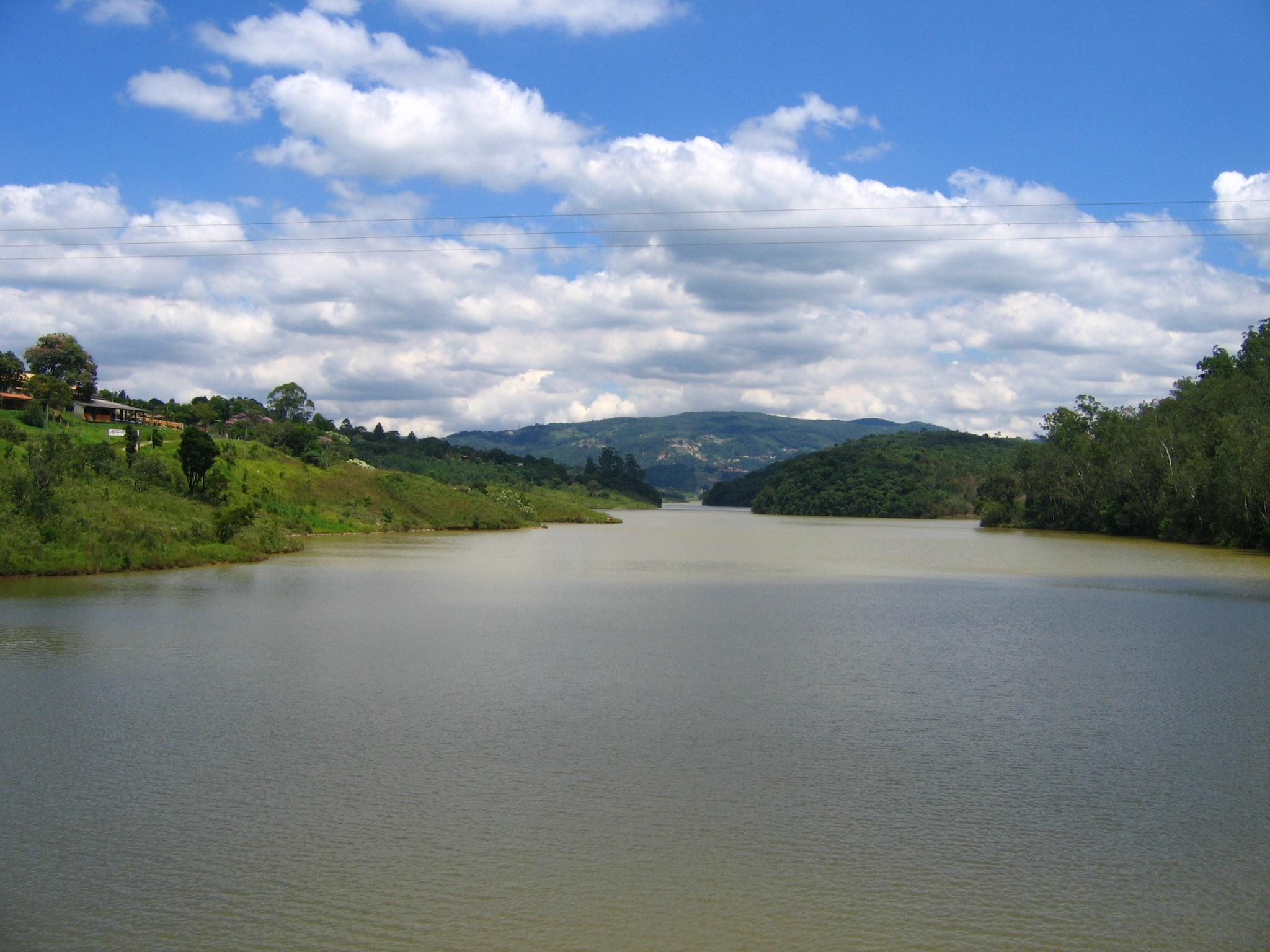
- Paiva Castro Dam, in Mairiporã

- Location within São Paulo state Location within Brazil
- Interactive map of Sistema Cantareira
- Coordinates: 23°19′48″S 46°40′44″W
- Catchment area: 2,307 km^{2} (891 sq mi)
- Managing agency: Sabesp
- First flooded: 29 June 1973 (Paiva Castro and Atibainha dams)
- Water volume: 990 million cubic metres (800,000 acre⋅ft)
- Settlements: Bragança Paulista, Piracaia, Vargem, Joanópolis, Nazaré Paulista, Franco da Rocha, Mairiporã, Caieiras and São Paulo

Sistema Cantareira (Cantareira system) is a water supply system in the state of São Paulo, Brazil. It is composed of five interconnected reservoirs that provide water to 9 million people in the São Paulo metropolitan area. The system is managed by Sabesp, São Paulo's state water management company.

== History ==
By 1960, the São Paulo state government, concerned about the high population growth of the city of São Paulo and neighboring towns, whose population has totaled 4.8 million inhabitants, decided to enhance the water supply of the Metropolitan Region of São Paulo, planning the construction of several reservoirs in the headwaters of Piracicaba River basin, thus beginning the Cantareira System.

In 1966, work began on the construction of reservoirs on the Juqueri River (today Paiva Castro), Cachoeira, and Atibainha. In 1976, the Jacarei and Jaguari reservoirs were started by adding a capacity of 22,000 liters, second to the system.

== 2014–17 water crisis ==
In 2014, low rainfall in the state of São Paulo led to a severe drought. The Cantareira system's water level has fallen constantly, leading to water shortages in some areas of the city. Among the measures taken by Sabesp to face the problem are reducing the water pressure to residences, a bonus for customers who save water, and exploring the reservoir's ground water.

With the lack of rain after November 2014, a severe drought situation developed. By February 2015, only 6% of Cantareira's capacity was filled.
