= Nazarene University =

Nazarene University may refer to:

- Point Loma Nazarene University, formerly Nazarene University, in San Diego, California, U.S.
- Africa Nazarene University in Nairobi, Kenya
- Ambrose University, formerly Nazarene University College, in Calgary, Alberta, Canada
- Eastern Nazarene College in Quincy, Massachusetts, U.S.
- Korea Nazarene University in Cheonan, South Korea
- MidAmerica Nazarene University in Olathe, Kansas, U.S.
- Mount Vernon Nazarene University in Mount Vernon, Ohio, U.S.
- Northwest Nazarene University in Nampa, Idaho, U.S.
- Olivet Nazarene University in Bourbonnais, Illinois, U.S.
- Southern Nazarene University in Bethany, Oklahoma, U.S.
- Trevecca Nazarene University in Nashville, Tennessee, U.S.

== See also ==
- List of Church of the Nazarene schools
