= Nazareth Academy High School =

Location
- 4001 Grant Avenue; Philadelphia, Pennsylvania 19114; United States; 40°3′36″N 74°59′21″W

Information
- Type: Private, All-Female
- Religious affiliation: Roman Catholic
- Established: 1928
- Oversight: Sisters of the Holy Family of Nazareth
- President: AmyLynn Flood
- Principal: Patricia Quinn
- Grades: 9-12
- Average class size: 20
- Student to teacher ratio: 9:1
- Campus size: 30 acres (120,000 m^{2})
- Colors: Blue and Gold
- Athletics conference: Athletic Association of Catholic Academies
- Mascot: Panda
- Accreditation: Middle States Association of Colleges and Schools
- Newspaper: The Nazareth
- Yearbook: The Marygold
- Tuition: $21,750 (2027-2028)
- Alumni: 7,000+
- Assistant Principal of Academics: Theresa Moore
- Assistant Principal of Student Life: Theresa Hartey
- Admissions Director: Ashley Figaniak
- Athletic Director: Brigid Kelley
- Website: nazarethacademyhs.org

Nazareth Academy High School is a private, Roman Catholic, all-girls high school in Philadelphia, Pennsylvania.

== Background ==
Nazareth Academy was established in 1928 by the Sisters of the Holy Family of Nazareth. Nazareth Academy educates young women at the high school level.

In August 2018, the school named its first lay principal, James Meredith.

== Notable alumnae ==
- Maureen Johnson - author
- Christina Perri - singer songwriter (Graduated from Archbishop Ryan HS)
