= Water management in the Metropolitan Region of São Paulo =

Water management in the Metropolitan Region of São Paulo, Brazil faces several challenges, including pollution of drinking water reservoirs that are surrounded by slums, water scarcity leading to conflicts with the Campinas Metropolitan area to the north, inefficient water use, and flooding. The sprawling Metropolitan Region of São Paulo (MRSP) with close to 20 million people is the seventh most populous urban area in the world and the economic, financial and technical hub of Brazil. The main stakeholders in water management in MRSP are the state government, the state water and sanitation utility Sabesp and 39 municipal governments. A basin committee for the Alto Tietê basin, which covers the entire area of the MRSP and supplies half of its water, brings together all stakeholders. It has drawn up two master plans for the management of water resources in the basin. The first was approved in 2003 and focused on urban sprawl. The second was approved in 2009 and focused on water use conflicts.

Together the stakeholders have addressed the challenges mentioned above through massive investments in wastewater collection and treatment and slum upgrading. In the future new water sources are being developed from the Iguape river in the Ribeira valley 80 km to the south of MRSP. Furthermore, the efficiency of existing water use is expected to be increased through more reuse of treated wastewater and further reductions in water losses.

== History ==
The first modern water supply system for São Paulo was built by a private company, the Cantareira Water Supply and Drainage Company of the City of São Paulo, in the 1880s. The company built a pipeline from the Cantareira mountains in the North to São Paulo, which would become the first element of what would later become the Cantareira system which now supplies half the water of Greater São Paulo. After the concession for the private Cantareira Water Supply and Drainage Company of the City of São Paulo had ended, the responsibility for water supply was taken over by the municipalities in the metropolitan area of São Paulo. In the early 20th century another private company, the São Paulo Tramway, Light and Power Company, built two dams on the Upper Tiete river upstream of what was then the city of São Paulo to produce electricity from hydropower for the growing city. The first was the Guarapiranga reservoir completed in 1906, followed by the Billings reservoir completed in 1935. Both reservoirs were initially used only for hydropower, but beginning in 1928 the Guarapiranga was also used for drinking water supply. As the city grew further, the Billings reservoir was also used for drinking water supply.

The 7,917 hectares (19,560 acres) Cantareira State Park, created in 1962, protects a large part of the metropolitan São Paulo water supply. In the 1970s the government of the state of São Paulo took a much more active role in water management. As in other Brazilian states at the time, a state water supply and sanitation company was established. The company, Sabesp, took over the responsibility for water supply and sanitation from most municipalities in the metropolitan area and in the rest of the state. At the same time, a State Environmental Agency named CETESB (Companhia Ambiental do Estado de São Paulo or The State of São Paulo Environmental Company) was created, being one of the first such agencies in Latin America. Among the first environmental measures was the state headwater protection law, which prohibited high-density residential occupation in 53% of Greater São Paulo. Also, the first wastewater collection and treatment systems were built. However, the measures proved to be ineffective. Slums spread on the shores of the Guarapiranga and Billings reservoirs, and the reservoirs were severely polluted. In 1986 the first slum upgrading program by the city of São Paulo began, all while more slums sprang up at the fringes of the metropolitan area.

In 1990 a radio programme called “The Meeting of the Rivers” compared the Tiete River to the River Thames in the 19th century and called for action to clean up the river. One year later, the state parliament passed a State Water Resources Law, the first of its kind in Brazil. It foresaw the creation of basin committees for 22 basins in the entire state, including one for the most polluted basin, the Alto Tiete. At the same time a petition that called for cleaning up the Tiete River was signed by 1.2 million signatories. Subsequently, the slum upgrading program was expanded to include the slums on the shores of the Guarapiranga reservoir, with the support of the World Bank and the Inter-American Development Bank. However, in order to address pollution in the river, various entities had to work together: Sabesp was in charge of water supply and sanitation; municipalities were in charge of zoning, building permit and solid waste management; and CETESB was in charge of regulating industries that discharged their wastewater into the river. In order to better coordinate the efforts of these entities, the Alto-Tietê Basin Committee was established in 1994. It initiated the First Alto Tiete Water Resources Master Plan, which addressed the issue of urban sprawl and was approved in 2003.

In 2007 the state government passed the State Complementary Law 1,025 that established a State Council for Water Supply and Sanitation CONESAN to better coordinate the efforts by the state government, Sabesp and municipalities. The law strengthens the State's regulatory and enforcement role, integrates planning and implementation activities, and promotes collaboration between the state, municipalities and civil society by creating a State Council for water supply and sanitation (CONESAN). Numerous initiatives were subsequently launched, such as the R$200 million Córrego Limpo (Clean Stream) program started by São Paulo municipality in 2007. A program to control water losses by Sabesp was set up in 2008. The Pacto de Aguas (Water Deal) by the State Environment Secretariat in 2009 was another program meant to engage all 645 municipalities in the state. In the same year, the Second Alto Tiete Water Resources Master Plan, which addressed the issue of water conflicts between various uses and stakeholders, was approved.

Despite these substantial efforts, it has not been possible to entirely clean up the river because new source of pollution emerged in the rapidly growing metropolitan area as older ones were brought under control. As of 2011, 55% of the municipal wastewater in São Paulo is being treated compared to only 20% twenty years earlier. The Tiete River is still biologically dead within the metropolitan area and as far as Salto 100 km downstream. Twenty years earlier the severe pollution extended until Barra Bonita, 260 km downstream.

== Geography and climate ==
Greater São Paulo area within the São Paulo State.

The climate of the MRSP is humid and subtropical, with temperatures ranging from highs of 30 °C (86 °F) during summer and lows of 15 °C (59 °F) during winter. Rainfall is abundant, amounting to an annual average of 1,317 millimetres (51.9 in). It is especially common in the warmer months, and somewhat scant between June and August.

The area covered by the MRSP is almost coterminous with the Alto Tietê basin. With a drainage area of 5,985 km^{2} (2.4% of the state's territory), the basin encompasses 35 of the 39 municipalities and 99.5% of the population of Greater São Paulo.

== Sector responsibilities ==
The main stakeholders in water management in MRSP are the state government, the state water and sanitation utility Sabesp and 35 municipal governments. A basin committee for the Alto Tietê basin, which supplies the other half of the water for the MRSP, brings together all stakeholders. The legal framework at the state level is based on two key federal laws, Law 9,433 of 1997 concerning water resources management and Law 11,445 of 2007 concerning water supply and sanitation. A key state law is Law 7,663 of 1991 which created what is called the State System for Water Resource Management. The system pioneered shared decision-making in water resources management even before the same principle was embodied in federal law. However, one of the most powerful actors in the system is Sabesp and industries, which have little incentive to actively participate in the basin-level decision-making process. A main issue generating conflict since the beginning of water reform is over who receives the proceeds of bulk water pricing, once it will be implemented. Some argue for centralization at the state level and others say that if basin committees and agencies should receive the revenues to become financially self-sufficient. The expected future revenues from water charging will only constitute 10 to 15% of needed investment. The difficulties in implementing this pricing system have delayed the advancement of the overall water management system.

Another important law is State Complementary Law 1,025 of 2007 concerning water supply and sanitation. The law strengthens the State's regulatory and enforcement role, integrates planning and implementation activities and promotes collaboration between the state, municipalities and civil society through a State Council for water supply and sanitation (CONESAN).

=== Responsibility for policy and regulation ===
The state government is a key stakeholder in the water sector. Within the state government the State Secretary for Water Supply, Sanitation and Energy (SSE) is responsible for water supply and sanitation policy. The State Secretary for the Environment (SEA) is responsible for environmental policy, including environmental aspects of water resources management through its water resources technical advisory team.

The State Water Resources Law, passed in 1991 by the state parliament foresaw the creation of twenty-two water basin management units (Unidades de Gerenciamento de Recursos Hídricos – UGRHIs) at the state level, of which the Alto Tiete unit is one. These units are governed by committees with the participation of the state government, municipalities and civil society. The committees are supported administratively by basin agencies. The committees were expected to initiate a new approach in planning and management, with the key elements being licensing water resources use, charging for water use and dividing the costs of multiple-use interventions which have collective benefit.

The São Paulo State Environment Agency (CETESB) is responsible for issuing environmental permits and for monitoring and enforcing compliance with pollution laws in the State. Created in the 1970s, it was one of the first environmental protection agencies in the country, and is widely respected in Brazil and abroad for its technical competence. However, its command-and-control pollution regulations have been mostly limited to the state's largest industries and worst polluters, and as a result, some other players, such as the water and sanitation companies, have been subject to much weaker regulation and enforcement.

The State has transformed the former gas and electricity regulator into a new gas, electricity and water supply and sanitation regulator in the new multi-sector regulatory agency ARSESP (Agencia Reguladora de Saneamento e Energia do Estado de São Paulo). The agency organises public hearings, public consultation, and has an independent ombudsperson.

=== Master plans ===
The first Alto Tietê water resources master plan was developed by the University of São Paulo and was approved in 2003. The first master plan (i) clarifies the main watershed issues; (ii) evaluates water uses, availability, impacts and sustainability; (iii) delineates an action plan; (iv) decides investment priorities; and (v) provides an opportunity for discussion of common problems and for their resolution. The first water resources master plan focused on the issue of urban sprawl. The second plan, approved in 2009, deals primarily with the growing conflict over water.

=== Responsibility for service provision ===
Of the 35 municipalities in the Alto Tietê, 29 (representing 79 percent of the MRSP's urban population) receive their water and sewer services directly from the State Water and Sanitation Company of São Paulo Sabesp. The other 6 municipalities receive treated bulk water from SABESP and distribute and bill for it via municipal utilities. Throughout the state, SABESP provides water to 23 million people and sewage services to 19 million. It is one of the largest water utilities in the world, and it is listed on the New York Stock Exchange.

The six municipalities in the MRSP not directly served by Sabesp are:

- Diadema (served by municipal company SANED);
- Santo André (served by municipal company SEMASA);
- Guarulhos (served by municipal company SAAE);
- Mogi das Cruzes (served by municipal company SEMAE);
- Mauá (served by a private operator under a municipal concession ECOSAMA); and
- São Caetano do Sul (served by municipal company DAE).

The municipal governments have responsibility for land use planning, including the elaboration of urban master plans and the control of land zoning and development.

== Water challenges ==
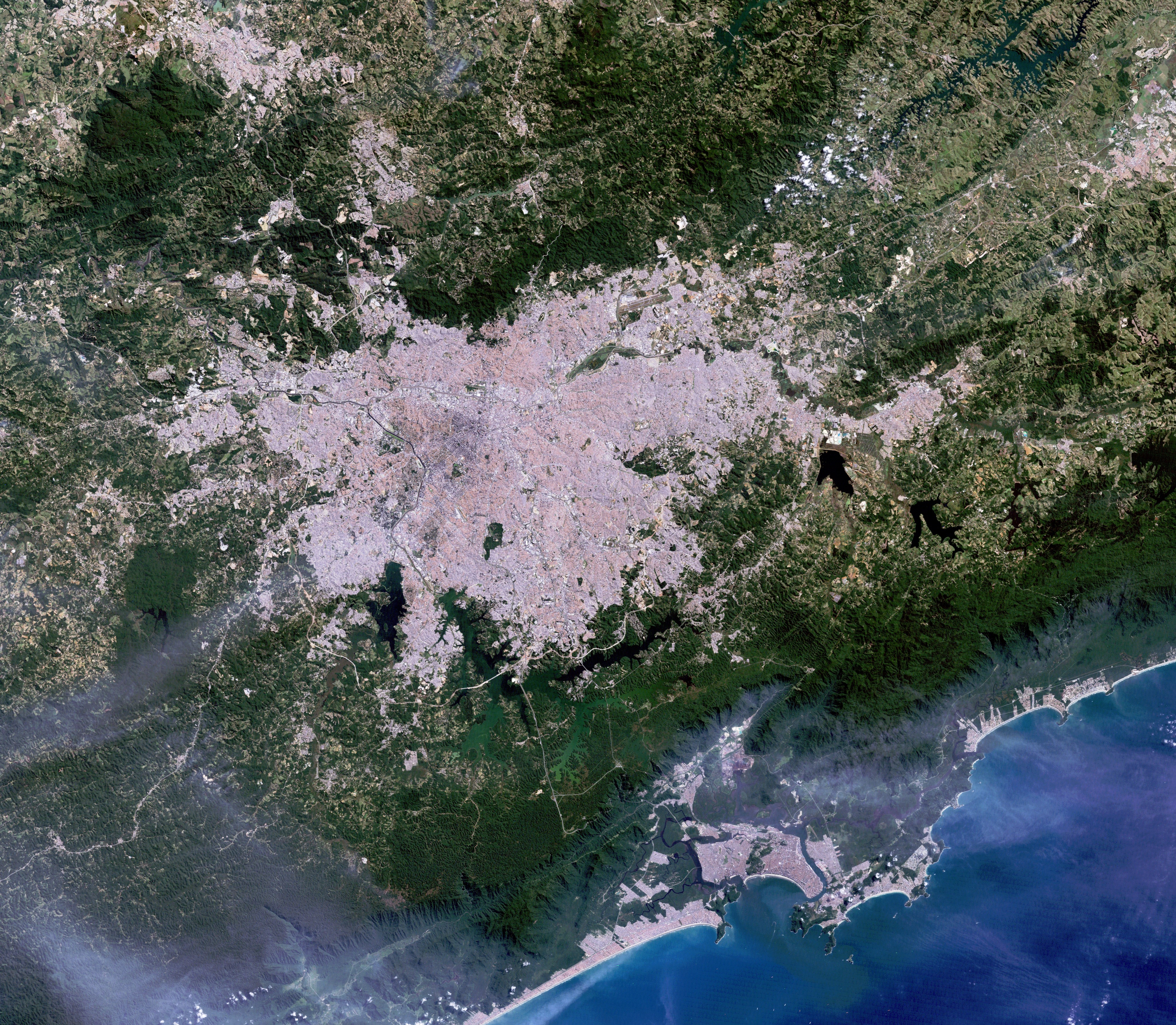
Satellite picture of São Paulo showing the Billing and Guarapiranga reservoirs completed surrounded by built-up areas.

The major water challenges in the MRSP are pollution of drinking water reservoirs that are surrounded by built-up areas including slums, water scarcity and conflicts, inefficient water use, and flooding.

Access to water supply and sanitation, as well as service quality for users, are not among the major water challenges in MRSP. It has relatively high coverage rates compared to other urban areas in Brazil: In 2004, 98.4 percent of the population had access to water through internal plumbing and 81.2 percent of the population had adequate sanitation. In general, water supply is continuous.

=== Pollution ===
According to the water quality information produced by the state environment agency (CETESB), the principal rivers have reasonable water quality conditions in the upstream portion of the basin; however, in the downstream portion, from the border of São Paulo onwards, the rivers are classified as being of extremely low quality. The quality of the Guarapiranga reservoir has worsened despite the implementation of the Guarapiranga pollution control program in 1992. The water quality of the Billings reservoir has improved since the transfer of the heavily polluted water from the Pinheiros River by the electricity company was restricted.

One of the main sources of water pollution in the MRSP is the slums around the Guarapiranga and Billings river basins because these neighborhoods often lack adequate sanitation services. The direct discharge of raw sewage into the waterbodies has caused eutrophication in both reservoirs as well as the Baixo Cotia, Biritiba and Ribeirão dos Cristais Rivers. In addition, defects in the wastewater treatment system have caused wastewater to overflow into the tributaries of the Guarapiranga reservoir. Defects in infrastructure for collecting and transporting sewage to the wastewater treatment plants also cause problems. The dumping of industrial effluents and pesticides from agriculture has resulted in additional pollution.

While the concentration of industry contributes to the water pollution problems in the MRSP, these are also a direct consequence of urbanization without the adequate infrastructure. Over many years within the Alto Tiete basin there was a total lack of investment in sewage collection, transport and treatment systems. Investments in treatment and collection network expansion were initiated in the Alto Tiete in the 1970s and increased substantially in the 1990s. However, as of 2005, in the municipalities within the Alto Tiete basin, only 65 percent of sewage is collected, and of this only 32 percent is treated. Sabesp operates 8 wastewater treatment plants in the MRSP treating more than 2 billion m³ of water, representing 72 percent of the wastewater treated in the entire State. However, in Guarulhos, the second largest population of the MRSP, there is no wastewater treatment. Overall, only 47% of the wastewater collected in the metropolitan area is being treated. The largest wastewater treatment plant is located in Guaraú on the Tiête River downstream of the city. The wastewater is channeled to the plant through interceptors along 60 km of the river.

In addition, while the MRSP has reasonable rates of collection and disposal of domestic solid waste, the amount that is not collected or disposed of inadequately (700 metric tons of trash) is still significant in absolute terms as it is often disposed in the region's water bodies.

=== Poverty and inappropriate land use ===
Approximately 16 percent of the population of the MRSP is poor. The vast majority of the almost two million residents in the Guarapiranga and Billings river basins are poor. They illegally occupied these areas given their proximity to the city center, notably the industrial and commercial areas along the banks of the Pinheiros River that joins the Tietê river in São Paulo. This expansion of the population to the basins around the reservoirs has occurred for several decades, and various attempts to regulate urban expansion to protect water sources have been unsuccessful. To protect strategic sources for urban water supply, the state headwater protection law, passed in the 1970s, prohibited high-density residential occupation in 53% of the MRSP. The law was not enforced effectively. Industries were prohibited from the protected areas because they were not able to obtain commercial and industrial permits; however, since the informal economy could circumvent the law, and these forms of expansion were the hardest to monitor and regulate, the poor moved into these areas. Uncontrolled and disorderly occupation in the Guarapiranga and Billings reservoirs took place without adequate water and sanitation services in precisely those areas where water source protection was the most important. The informal settlements and slums have become part of the urban landscape and they cause direct pollution of the reservoirs through wastewater and garbage discharge and storm water run-off and silting, thus threatening their future as water bodies for potable supplies and other uses.

=== Water scarcity ===
Water sources. Surface water accounts for about 80% of water use in the MRSP, and groundwater for 20%. The state water utility Sabesp and municipal utilities obtain all their water from surface water. The annual water availability of the Alto Tietê is just 201 m³ per capita, which is lower than in the driest state of the Brazilian Northeast. The São Paulo Council on Water Resources has defined watersheds as being in critical condition when the relationship between demand and availability surpasses 50 percent. According to this definition, the Alto Tietê is in the most critical condition of all the twenty-two watersheds in the State of São Paulo, with a demand/availability ratio of 442 percent.

There are eight production systems that supply drinking water to the 19 million people that live in the São Paulo Metropolitan Area. All of these suffer from problems of degradation resulting from sewage pollution, deforestation and uncontrolled urban expansion in watershed areas. The main systems are the Cantareira, Guarapiranga and Billings systems which together provide the water consumed by 70% of the population. Smaller interbasin transfers to the Alto Tietê come from the Capivari and Guaratuba rivers.

The Cantareira System, an interbasin transfer, supplies nearly half the water for Greater São Paulo (31 m³/s). It is one of the biggest drinking water production systems in the world. The system is formed by six reservoirs in five basins located in the Serra da Cantareira to the North of Greater São Paulo in the states of São Paulo and Minas Gerais, covering twelve municipalities, as well as the Guaraú water treatment plant. Several areas within the system have suffered deforestation, which affects the natural water production capacity. Another problem is the increasing rate of urban settlement around the reservoirs, leading in most cases to water contamination from sewage. Nevertheless, overall water quality from the Cantareira system is good. The last time the transfer from the Cantareira system has been renegotiated for another 10 years was in 2004, under difficult circumstances. An expansion of the volume of this transfer is not deemed to be possible.

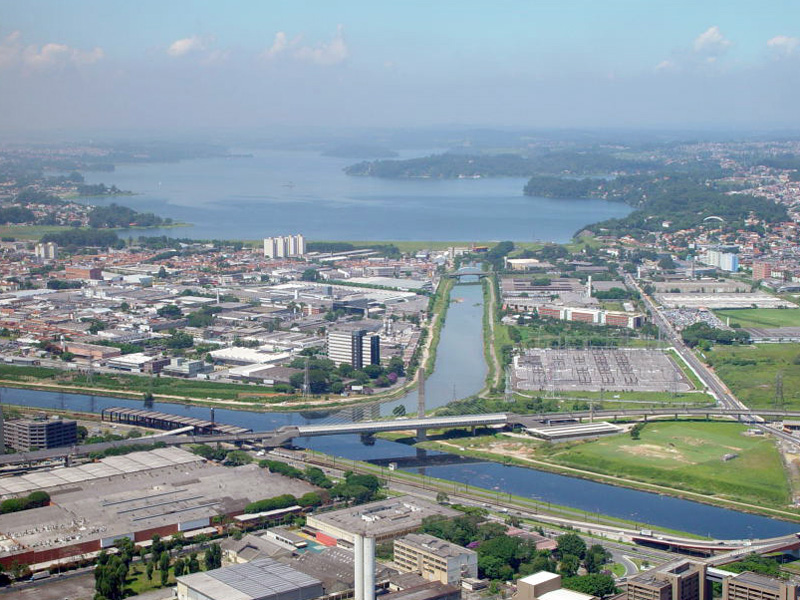
The Guarapiranga reservoir, which is exposed to pollution, supplies drinking water to nearly four million people.

The Guarapiranga basin supplies water to nearly four million people, mainly in the south-western part of the city of São Paulo. It is more than a hundred years old and has become the most endangered basin in the Greater São Paulo area. Its main problems are uncontrolled urban expansion with no basic sanitation and widespread use of the basin for economic activities, threatening natural water production.

The Billings Reservoir was constructed to provide power supply to the new emerging industrial São Paulo in the 1930s. It is one of the biggest metropolitan water reservoirs in the world, but due to inadequate urban planning and the lack of wastewater treatment in the MRSP, it became heavily polluted during the 1980s. In the 1990s, environmental control over the reservoir became more restrictive and the water quality improved. As of 2009, the Billings Reservoir supplies water to over two and a half million people. Its main source of pollution is the Pinheiros River, whose water has been pumped into the Billings basin for over sixty years in order to provide water for the hydropower generation. The Billings Reservoir also plays an important role in flood control for the MRSP. Urban settlements in the area with no basic sanitation and extensive land use have also jeopardized water quality in the basin. Since 2000, part of the Billings water supply has been sent to the Guarapiranga reservoir in order to complement its water production capacity. Hydropower production, potable water supply and flood control are conflicting uses for the Billings Reservoir.

Both the Guarapiranga and the Billings basin face serious water quality issues due to the extensive presence of urban slums with no sewage or solid waste collection system. The banks of the basins were originally designated as environmentally protected areas, but they were quickly invaded by poor immigrants to the metropolitan region in search of work and opportunity. During the 1990s the population on the banks of the Billings grew by over 50 percent, resulting in the deterioration of the environmentally protected areas in the vicinity of the headwaters. These highly unequal and disparate types of urban occupancy have limited or no basic urban infrastructure, and people live in shacks built on steep hillsides, in valley bottoms, flood-prone areas, flood plains or perched along the banks of rivers and streams, with limited or no access to proper sanitation. There are also conflicts over water use with hydropower production.

Groundwater is used by industries (35% of wells), private homes and apartment buildings (25%) and services (24%). The amount of groundwater recharge and abstraction is not well known, but its recharge is estimated at 15m3/s and extraction at 10m3/s, and it is expected to increase. The increasing use of groundwater is a result of SABESP's pricing policy that is not conducive to conservation and a lack of monitoring and control of groundwater use. In municipalities where water and sanitation is supplied not by Sabesp but by local government, the government's lack of ability in expanding water supply exacerbates the exploitation of groundwater resources. There is a high threat of groundwater contamination, especially in the Eastern part of the Alto Tietê.

Water demand. Water demand in the Alto Tietê in 2004 was as follows:

Municipal water demand	Industrial water demand	Irrigation water demand	Total water demand
68.50 m³/s	14.33 m³/s	3.59 m³/s	86.42 m³/s

=== Water conflicts ===
In the Alto Tietê there is growing conflict between drinking water supply and irrigation. Only one sub-basin of the Alto Tietê can expand its potable water supply from the current supply of 10 m³/s up to 15 m³/s. In other water basins serving the MRSP this is not the case. For example, in the Guarapiranga and Billings basin there is also a conflict with hydropower production. The second State Water Resources Master Plan, approved in 2009, focuses on the conflict over water use.

=== Inefficient water use ===
The level of non-revenue water in the MRSP is estimated at 40%, meaning that 40% of water supplied to the network is either lost through leakage or, even if delivered to customers, is not being billed. In the municipalities served by Sabesp the level of NRW is only 28%, while it is more than 50% in some of the municipalities that are directly in charge of distributing water that is supplied to them in bulk by Sabesp.

=== Flooding ===
The densification and verticalization of urban settlement have resulted in increased impermeability of soils. Specifically, urbanization has led to the impermeability of 37% of land within the Alto Tiete basin. The result has been that urban areas are both the causes of increased flooding and its main victims. Since 1998, a Macro-Drainage Plan for the Alto-Tiete basin has been under preparation in order to diagnose existing and expected problems and devise solutions from a technical, economic and environmental perspective. However, the problem is one of land-use planning, which is the responsibility of the municipalities, even though it affects water resource policy, which is a responsibility of the state.

== Approaches to address the challenges ==
There have been many joint efforts by Brazilian authorities, often with the support of multilateral lending agencies, to tackle the water and poverty challenges in the MRSP.

=== Pollution control and slum upgrading ===
Pollution control projects provide sewerage as well as wastewater treatment, green areas, and promote community awareness. Since 1986, the municipal government of São Paulo has carried out slum upgrading interventions in 81 slums, benefiting over 87,000 households, and currently it is pressing ahead with slum upgrading works in more than 27 communities which will benefit around 72,000 households. The municipality of São Bernardo do Campo also has broad experience in slum rehabilitation, having undertaken civil works and related interventions in 62 slums, benefiting approximately 18,000 households. Their experience in slum upgrading led it being awarded a Best Practice and Local Leadership Program Award by UN-Habitat. The Tietê Project was launched in September 1991 by the State Government launched the Tietê Project to clean up the rivers and reservoirs of the São Paulo area. It involved the construction of sewerage and municipal wastewater treatment plants by Sabesp as well as the construction of industrial wastewater treatment plants. The project has four phases, of which the first two are completed. The third phase will end in 2015, and the fourth phase should run from 2013 to 2018 with the aim of universal treatment of wastewater. During the three first phases US$2.65 billion were invested or are in the process of being invested. 4,450 km of collecting networks will be installed, 1,135 km of interceptors, 740,000 new connections to residences and three new wastewater treatment plants. Foreign financing was obtained from the Inter-American Development Bank, the World Bank and JICA from Japan. The fourth phase of the Tietê project will cost US$1.9 billion. Sabesp has approached KfW (Germany), AFD (French Development Agency), CAF (Corporação Andina de Fomento), IFC, besides commercial banks such as Morgan Stanley, Santander, Itaú, Banco do Brasil, Bradesco, HSBC, and Caixa Economica for financing.

=== Reducing water losses ===
Sabesp has implemented a ten-year program (2008–2018) to control and reduce non-revenue water by enhancing infrastructure, combating fraud and illegal connections, and improving staff training. So far there has been no comparable effort to reduce non-revenue water in municipalities that receive water from Sabesp and distribute it themselves, where levels of NRW are higher than in municipalities where Sabesp distributes water.

=== Water reuse ===
The reuse of treated wastewater is still a novel concept in Brazil due to absence of a proper legal framework. Only 2 percent of companies reuse treated wastewater, despite the fact that it costs only 8 percent of the conventional rate (though transport costs can be significantly higher from the wastewater treatment plant to the company). In 1997 the Brazilian Association of Technical Standards (ABNT) defined instructions and parameters (NBR 13969) for wastewater reuse, including the level of treatment required based on the reuse activities. Federal Resolution 54/2005 of the National Council of Water Resources states that direct non-potable treated wastewater can be used in landscape irrigation, washing public streets, fire fighting, agricultural production, industrial activities and environmental projects. Currently a draft resolution is under consideration by the São Paulo Secretariats of Health, Environment, and Water Supply, Sanitation and Energy on urban wastewater reuse; however, as of 2009 the State had no legal framework on this issue. Only the municipality of São Paulo, within the MRSP, had issued its own regulations mandating the use of reused water for the washing of streets, sidewalks and plazas and irrigating parks, gardens and sports fields. In November 2012 Sabesp and Foz Brazil, a subsidiary of the conglomerate Odebrecht, inaugurated the largest industrial water reuse project in Brazil, Aquapolo Ambiental. It provides 1 cubic meter per second to the petrochemical complex Capuava in Mauá in the eastern part of the metropolitan region through a 17 km pipeline. The cost of the reclaimed water is lower than drinking water, and drinking water that was used at the complex is now made available for municipal use.

=== Tapping new water sources: The Macro-Metropolis Plan ===
One of the long-term plans to provide more water to the Metropolitan area of São Paulo is the Macro-Metropolis Plan, which covers three metropolitan regions: Metro São Paulo; the meso-region of Campinas with 3.6 million inhabitants (2005 est.) and 49 cities; and the coastal metropolitan region south of São Paulo. Overall this macro-metropolis includes 152 municipalities with 30 million inhabitants. The tentative plans to supply this region with water consider adding 80m3/s of water supply to the area. A water diversion project, the Sao Lourenco Water Producing System, is to bring water from the Iguape River in the Ribeira valley 80 km south of MRSP. The $823 million system to provide 4.7 cubic meter per second will be developed under a public-private partnership. In early 2013 bidding was underway and the system is expected to be operational in 2017.

=== Water conservation ===
Average per capita water use in São Paulo is about 180 liters per day, with large variations between the rich and poor. This compares to an average water use of less than 120 liter per capita and day in much richer Germany. Some Brazilian observers, such as Aldo Rebouças, an engineer at the University of São Paulo, have argued that 100 liter per capita would be sufficient and that there is substantial scope for water conservation in São Paulo making expensive new projects to bring water from far away unnecessary. Sabesp has argued that per capita water consumption has already decreased 20 percent over six years.

=== Watershed protection ===
To address declining water yields and deteriorating water quality in the Cantareira system in Brazil's Atlantic Forest, the Nature Conservancy supports Brazil's first Water Producer Program. As part of the program the Extrema municipality in the Piracicaba watershed directs funds collected from water users to pay farmers and ranchers who protect or restore riparian forests on their lands. Landowners are earning about $28 per acre per year for the water their forests are producing.

== Financing ==
=== Domestic financing ===
Growth Acceleration Program (Programa de Aceleração de Crescimento - PAC). The PAC is an ambitious Federal program designed to direct investment to various important infrastructure sectors. Key PAC investment areas include water supply and sanitation, slum and urban upgrading and housing. PAC funds are being provided to State and municipal governments on both a loan and grant basis. In the MRSP, joint requests for PAC resources have been made to the Federal Government by the State Secretariat for Water and Energy, the São Paulo Municipal Government and the State Housing and Urban Development Company (CDHU – with particular emphasis on slum and urban upgrading, expansion of solid waste collection systems and resettlement of families.

Water abstraction charges. It is expected that beginning in 2010 charges for the abstraction of water will be introduced in the Alto Tietê. Revenues from these charges are expected to be used to finance priority investments to rehabilitate the watershed. Revenues from these charges are expected to be in the order of US$25 million, which is only the fraction of the annual investments of Sabesp which stand at US$700 million.

Programa Córrego Limpo is a R$200 million Sabesp-Municipality of São Paulo program initiated in 2007 to remove wastewater pollution from 100 urban streams throughout the MRSP. As of 2010, 96 streams have been cleaned up.

The Pacto das Águas (Water Deal) is a program initiated in 2009 by the State Secretariat of Environment to engage all 645 municipalities in the state, encouraging them to set goals for improving water management including sanitation and headwaters and spring protection. The program was accompanied by media and educational campaigns, as well as workshops for capacity building.

=== External financing ===
External financing is provided by the World Bank, the Inter-American Development Bank, Japan International Cooperation Agency and other external agencies.

==== Inter-American Development Bank ====
On-going projects: Phase Three of the Tiete River Cleanup Program - A project approved in October 2009 for which the Inter-American Development Bank made available $600 million in form of a loan. The purpose of the project is to increase the rate of wastewater collection and treatment in the MRSP and thereby to restore the water quality of the Tiete river.

In December 2010 the IDB approved another US$115.7m loan to support a US$200m project "to recover the environmental and social function of the Alto Río Tiete", with investments in São Paulo, Guaraulhos, Itaquaquecetuba, Bridle, Suzano, Mogi das Cruzes, Biritiba-Mirim and Salesopolis.

In September 2009 the IDB approved a US$0.75m grant to support the Regulatory Agency for Sanitation and Energy in São Paulo.

Completed projects: Tietê River Decontamination (1999–2008) – A US$1.5 billion Sabesp program financed by the Inter-American Development Bank and BNDES to expand wastewater collection and treatment in MRSP – with a focus on the wastewater system's trunk infrastructure and treatment works, as well as service expansion in formal areas of the city.

==== Japan ====
Study on Integrated Plan of Environmental Improvement of Billings Reservoir (initiated in 2008) – A Japan International Cooperation Agency-financed initiative with SABESP and the municipal government of São Bernardo do Campo to study the expansion of sanitation infrastructure throughout the municipality. JICA has stated its intention to invest up to $100 million in the actions identified by the study to reduce pollution of the Billings reservoir, including expansion of wastewater infrastructure, remediation of a deactivated sanitary landfill and expansion of green areas and parks.

==== World Bank ====
On-going projects: The Mananciais Program for Integrated Water Management in Metropolitan São Paulo (approved in 2009) - A $283 million project co-financed by World Bank loans (US$131m), the state government ($ 57m), Sabesp ($ 25m) and the two participating municipalities ($ 26m). Its objectives are: (i) to protect and maintain the quality and reliability of the MRSP's water resources; (ii) to improve the quality of life of the poor populations residing in key targeted urban river basins in MRSP; and (iii) to strengthen institutional capacity and improve metropolitan management and coordination in water resources management, water pollution control, land-use policy and basic service provision. It does so by supporting "institutional capacity building", urban upgrading, environmental protection and recovery, as well as "integrated water supply and sanitation". Specifically, the project will include reforestation, the creation of green spaces and protected areas, the "urbanization of slums", housing for resettled people, water quality monitoring, environmental education, the preparation of land use laws as well as "studies on metropolitan governance". The program has four phases. The first two phases, approved in 2009, included loans for the State of São Paulo and Sabesp. The third and fourth phases, approved in 2012, include loans for the municipalities of São Bernardo do Campo in the drainage area of the Billings Reservoir and Guarulhos in the Upper Tiete drainage area.

Reagua is a project jointly financed by the World Bank and the State of São Paulo to recover water quantity and quality in the five most critical watersheds in the State, including the Alto Tietê. It will focus on activities that increase the availability of water within the State, including reducing non-revenue water, promoting the rational use of water, constructing sanitation systems and incentivizing the reuse of treated wastewater. A USD 64.5 million loan to support the project was approved by the World Bank in May 2010.

Completed projects: São Paulo Water Quality and Pollution Control Project (1994–2000) – A $387 million project co-financed by the State and the World Bank, which initiated the learning of the Guarapiranga river basin, implemented the institutional capacity to manage the basin in an environmentally sustainable manner and improved the quality of life of residents of the slums and illegal settlements in the basin by providing them with water supply and sanitation services. Among the achievements of the Guarapiranga project (along with other similar programs) were the slum upgrading activities, which took place in 52 slums. The project contributed to increased community awareness, as reflected in the enhanced level of respect for public areas, equipment and amenities, in the upgrading of households with residents’ own funds and in the overall post-program increase in real estate values. Nevertheless, pollution problems discussed earlier in the article concerning the Guarapiranga river basin continue largely unabated. The water quality of the reservoir and its rivers, creeks and other tributaries is declining by the year given that only half of the dwellings have some sort of solid waste collection system and most of the solid waste collected continues to be disposed of in the reservoir as many poor households still have no formal wastewater collection and disposal at all.

== See also ==
- Water supply and sanitation in Brazil
- Water resources management in Brazil
- 2015 Brazilian drought
