= Irrigation in Brazil =

- Land area: 8,459,000 km^{2}
- Agricultural land: 31%
- Cultivated area equipped for irrigation: 4.4%
- Irrigated area: 3,500,000 ha
- Systems: Flood irrigation: 42%; Furrow irrigation: 6%; Sprinkler irrigation: 22%; Central pivot irrigation: 23%; Localized irrigation: 6%
- Share of irrigated agriculture in GDP: ~8% (1998)
- Water sources for irrigation: Surface water (95%)
- Tariff: 3.51 to 24.58 USD per 1,000 m

Irrigation in Brazil has been developed through the use of different models. Public involvement in irrigation is relatively new while private investment has traditionally been responsible for irrigation development. Private irrigation predominates in the populated South, Southeast, and Center-West regions with most of the country’s agricultural and industrial development. In the Northeast region, investments made by the public sector seek to stimulate regional development in an area prone to droughts and with serious social problems. These different approaches have resulted in diverse outcomes. Of the 120 million hectares (ha) that are potentially available for agriculture, only about 3.5 million ha are under irrigation, although estimates show that 29 million ha are suitable for this practice.

== Development ==
=== Infrastructure and linkages with water resources ===

Although irrigation methods in Brazil may be considered modern compared to those of other countries in the region, gravity irrigation accounts for 48% of the total irrigated agricultural area (3.5 million ha), 42% use flooding (rice), and 6% use furrows or other gravity methods. Of the remaining 52%, approximately 22% use mobile sprinkler systems, 23% use mechanized sprinkling (central pivot), 1% uses perforated or gated tubes, and 6% use localized irrigation, i.e., drip and/or micro-sprinkling systems.

Brazil has always been considered a country rich in water. However, Brazil's hydro-climatic regions and irrigation systems vary widely. In the South, frosty conditions in winter have limited irrigation mainly to summer flooding of lowlands for rice production. In the milder Southeast, irrigation in winter has made double-cropping possible. Winter wheat, peas, or beans are rotated with rainfed summer crops, including cotton. Local water shortage occurs in some small watersheds in the Southeast and South where irrigation development and water consumption for industry and municipal use have been relatively uncontrolled. The large size and level terrain of farms in the vast cerrado areas of the Center-West are well suited to center-pivot and self-propelled irrigation systems, which have expanded rapidly in the last few years.

Much of the Northeast is semi-arid land and has severely limited water resources compared with the other regions. Most irrigation projects depend upon the few perennial rivers such as the Sao Francisco. The groundwater supply is limited so approximately 95% of irrigated lands use surface water. Water from the Sao Francisco River, the main river in the Northeast, has to be conveyed over considerable distances to irrigable land . Most of Brazil's humid tropics are in the North. Irrigation needs in that region are low, and development is limited to small areas of lowland rice.

=== Environmental impacts ===
Little information is available on drainage, salinity, and waterlogging in Brazil. The natural saline areas in Brazil are quantified on average at 86 million ha, located especially in the driest areas with average precipitation below 1,000 mm/y. The area affected by salinity as a result of improper irrigation is estimated at 15,000 ha and is located mostly in the Northeast, affecting 40% of the irrigated land. The extension of the areas with natural waterlogging, called "varzeas", is 13.35 million ha.

== History ==
=== Agricultural land ===
In 1970 there were fewer than 800,000 hectares (ha) of irrigated land, used mainly as rice paddies in the state of Rio Grande do Sul, and less intensively in some public irrigation areas in the Northeast. Irrigation has really only taken off since then, with the implementation of public investment policies in infrastructure for irrigation, energy transmission and distribution, and finance for equipment and day-to-day expenses through programs such as the Northeast Irrigation Program (PROINE) and the National Irrigation Program (PRONI).

Today about 3.5 million ha are under irrigation, although 29 million ha are estimated to be suitable for irrigation by the National Water Agency (ANA). Irrigation is developing through different models. In the South, Southeast, and Center-West regions, private irrigation predominates. with emphasis on planting rice and grain crops. In these areas investment depends on the return obtained from the sale of the irrigated crops. Investment in the Northeast has traditionally been focused on crops such as corn or beans, and has moved to irrigated fruit production.

=== Institutional development ===
Law 94904 of December 1965 entrusted the National Department for Water and Electrical Energy (DNEE) with the management and control of Brazil’s water resources. In June 1979, the Ministry of the Interior (MINTER) assumed the power to authorize water use for irrigation. The authority for water use was therefore divided between DNAEE, which remained responsible for water use for all purposes, and MINTER, which was allocated control over water for irrigation. In February 1986, the federal irrigation functions of MINTER were consolidated under the direction of a special Ministry of Irrigation Affairs. A National Irrigation Program was created in 1986 with two coordinating bodies for the Northeast Irrigation Program (PROINE) and the National Irrigation Program (PRONI), which were in charge of the coordination and promotion of irrigation programs in the Northeast and the rest of the country, respectively, in collaboration with the newly created state-level Irrigation Coordinating Committees. Its initial plan to increase the total irrigated area by 3.0 million ha, or 120%, in five years (1986–90) was scaled back due to technical and institutional constraints, cutbacks in the availability of federal and state funding, and uncertain macroeconomic conditions in Brazil. In December 1988, PROINE and PRONI were merged into a single national irrigation program (a new PRONI). A month later, the special Ministry of Irrigation Affairs was abolished and its functions transferred to the Secretariat of Irrigation Affairs under the Ministry of Agriculture. The federal executing agencies were also transferred to the Ministry of Agriculture.

In addition to these institutional arrangements, private irrigation development was supported through the Program for the Development of Flood Plains (PROVARZEAS), created in 1981, and the Program for Financing Irrigation Equipment (PROFIR), created in 1982, both under the Ministry of Agriculture.

Field implementation of federally funded irrigation infrastructure was carried out by the Company for the Development of the Sao Francisco Valley (CODEVASF) and the National Department for Drought Defense Works (DNOS). Since January 1999, irrigation affairs, including DNOS and CODEVASF, have been transferred to a "Special Secretariat for Regional Policies," which falls under the Ministry of National Integration. Various responsibilities in support of irrigation projects have also been transferred to the Ministry of Agriculture and Supply (MAA).

== Legal and institutional framework ==
=== Legal framework ===
The 1934 Water Code was the first relevant water resources management legislation in Brazil. This Act ensured the free use of any water current or spring for basic life necessities and permits everyone to use any public waters, observing administrative regulations.

The 1988 Constitution established a national water resources management system. The Constitution divided the country’s waters between the union and the states, and states began to implement their own water resources management systems. São Paulo pioneered this process and approved a water resources management act in 1991.

An Irrigation Law, enacted in 1979, sets government policies for irrigation development dealing with: (i) utilization of land and water; (ii) research and planning; (iii) implementation of public projects; (iv) water tariffs for public projects; (v) preservation of water quality; (vi) expropriation of land for irrigation construction; and (vii) promotion of private projects. The Irrigation Law and its regulations provide for the cost recovery of investment and operation and maintenance (O&M) costs of government-supported irrigation projects through water charges to beneficiaries.

=== Institutional framework ===
Management and control of the country's water resources are divided among several government agencies. There is no formal mechanism for effectively coordinating their policies and activities. The Ministry of Environment is in charge of water policies, with the exception of irrigation.

The Ministry of National Integration deals mainly with irrigation and programs to promote the development of the country’s neediest regions. The main executing agencies of the Ministry of National Integration are: CODEVASF, which implements irrigation projects in the São Francisco River Basin; the Office of the Superintendent for the Development of the Northeast Region (SUDENE), which implements programs targeted to the Northeast; and the Office of the Superintendent for the Development of the Amazon Region (SUDAM), which implements programs targeted to the Northern Region.

Brazil underwent an important process of decentralization during the 1990s, allowing local governments to exert a strong influence on policy making. Most state governments have their own Secretariats of Agriculture and carry out a wide range of tasks related to the agricultural sector, such as agricultural extension and research, irrigation investments, and poverty alleviation projects, especially in the Northeast.

Outside the government, civil society organizations, universities, and other research institutions play a very influential role in policy making.

=== Public-private role ===
According to the Irrigation Law, irrigation projects may be either public or private (Art. 8). Public Projects are those whose irrigation infrastructure is designed, built, and operated, either directly or indirectly, under the responsibility of the Public Authority. Private Projects are those whose irrigation infrastructure is designed, built, and operated by the private sector, either with or without public sector incentives.

Although this classification makes it possible to easily distinguish between projects that are clearly of a public nature, in which the Public Authority builds and operates the common irrigation infrastructure and settles family farmers, and projects that are entirely of a private nature, carried out with private infrastructure and on private land, the classification of projects with the relevant participation of both the Public Authority and the private sector is not yet clear.

The aim of Bill No 6.381 (Irrigation Bill), being considered by the Chamber of Deputies and already approved by the Federal Senate (PL 229), is to reformulate the National Irrigation Policy, adapting it to present circumstances and revoking Law No 6.662/79. The Irrigation Bill will propose a third category—the Mixed Irrigation Project—defined as a project executed and implemented in accordance with Law No 11079 of December 30, 2004, which establishes the public-private partnership scheme–PPP (Art. 12).

==== Pontal public-private partnership in irrigation ====
This project seeks to establish a public-private partnership (PPP) for irrigation infrastructure in an area of 7,717 hectares for commercial agriculture in the Pontal region, State of Pernambuco. The government would cede the land and the existing infrastructure, already covering a significant part of the target area. The private partner would operate, manage and further develop the infrastructure to ensure that the area is fully irrigated within six years. Up to 75% of the land would be farmed by large commercial producers and at least 25% by small farmers, who would be integrated into the production chain of the commercial producers. The private partner will be remunerated through the sale of water and a capacity payment by the government.

== Water tariff and cost recovery ==
No bulk water fees are charged for the use of water for irrigation. An inconsistent system of water tariffs for O&M in public irrigation projects is in use. These tariffs are allocated to the sponsoring agency and distributed to the irrigation districts. In 1997 the cost of water tariffs in public irrigation projects ranged from US$3.51 to US$24.58 per 1,000 m^{3}.

Water fees in public irrigation projects are regulated by the Irrigation Law (1984 Law 89.496). This legislation states that water tariffs in public irrigation projects are estimated by the sum of two coefficients, Kl and K2. Coefficient K1, calculated annually, corresponds to the payment of public capital investment in a project's infrastructure. It assumes a 50-year repayment period and subsidized interest rates, and its value is a function of the irrigated area. In 1998, the K1 value for public irrigation projects was R$4.41/ha/month. Coefficient K2 is meant to cover the total O&M cost of a project, and is estimated as a function of the volume of water used (R$/1,000 in3). In practice, the K1 tariff is paid to the sponsoring federal agency, while the K2 component is usually paid directly to the water user district.

== Investment ==
Most Brazilian irrigation development has been carried out by the private sector, with little government support. Government investments have focused on the semi-arid Northeast area, with a high concentration of poor population. More than US$2 billion in public funds have been invested in irrigation works over the past three decades, serving 200,000 ha in the Brazilian semi-arid region, 140,000 ha of which are under production.

Investment costs for settling small farmers in public irrigation projects have averaged US$6,500/ha, including on-farm development and the necessary irrigation equipment. For a farm size of 6.0 ha the investment per family is some US$40,000 on average, not including the cost of agricultural support services and operational subsidies. The cost of public irrigation projects that provide water for large farmers and commercial farming enterprises (only the off-farm, main conveyance system) are considerably lower, depending on the distance of the irrigated area from the water source, the elevation of the command area, and the layout of the schemes. Investment costs of private irrigation development, with short conveyance distances from the source of water to the irrigated areas and low pumping lifts, are usually a fraction of the cost of public schemes and range from less than US$600 to US$3,500/ha, depending on the type of on-farm technology used. Generally, investment costs for private irrigation are higher in the Northeast than in other regions due to more limited access to perennial sources of water.

== Possible climate change impacts ==
Global climate change will affect the climate of Northeast Brazil. According to an assessment by Krol and Van Oel for the State of Ceara, the direction of precipitation changes cannot be determined with certainty. Both very significant precipitation losses and moderate precipitation increases should be considered plausible. The impacts of precipitation losses would cause large-scale reductions in the availability of stored surface water, leading to an increasing imbalance between water demand and water supply after 2025. Agricultural production would show negative tendencies after 2025 due to insufficiency of water supply to meet irrigation water demands.

== External cooperation ==
In 2008, the Government of Brazil, represented by CODEVASF/Ministry of National Integration, is seeking help from the World Bank to prepare an environmental, social, and financial assessment for the concession of public irrigation perimeters in the Southeast region.

== Lessons learned ==
A World Bank evaluation of irrigation projects in Brazil's Semi-Arid Region concluded that, despite many problems, there was a positive evolution in the implementation of irrigated agriculture—both public and private—in the Semi-Arid Region in the three decades since it began. The focus of public projects evolved from socially based efforts to sustainable entrepreneurial activity; from subsistence farming to agribusiness; from traditional subsistence crops to highly technical fruit cultivation; and from conventional irrigation to modern localized and precision irrigation techniques.

The study showed that the inclusion of entrepreneurial producers in public irrigation perimeters, through the successful partnership between public- and private-sector agents, was a key factor in the positive performance of irrigated agriculture in the region. Other factors that contributed to success were: (i) suitable scales and rates of implementation; (ii) ongoing political and financial support; (iii) skilled and creative executing agencies; (iv) adequate urban/municipal support; (v) effective technological support; (vi) proximity to markets and ports; (vii) aggressive, efficient marketing; (viii) organization of producers; (ix) organization and standardization of products; and (x) good management of primary production units. Successful projects had high rates of economic return (between 16 percent and 19 percent).

== See also ==
- Water resources management in Brazil
- Water supply and sanitation in Brazil
