= Water resources management in Brazil =

- Withdrawals by sector 2000/2001: Domestic: 12%; Agriculture: 80%; Industry: 8%
- Renewable water resources: 8,233 km^{3}
- Surface water produced internally: 5,418 km^{3}
- Groundwater recharge: 1,874 km^{3}
- Overlap shared by surface water and groundwater: 1,874 km^{3}
- Renewable water resources per capita: 43,028 m^{3}/year
- Wetland designated as Ramsar sites: 6.4 million ha
- Hydropower generation: 81%

Water resources management is a key element of Brazil's strategy to promote sustainable growth and a more equitable and inclusive society. Brazil's achievements over the past 70 years have been closely linked to the development of hydraulic infrastructure for hydroelectric power generation and just recently to the development of irrigation infrastructure, especially in the Northeast region.

Two challenges in water resources management stand out for their enormous social impacts: (i) unreliable access to water with a strong adverse impact on the living and health standards of the rural populations in the Northeast where two million households, most in extreme poverty, live, and (ii) water pollution in and near large urban centers, which compromises poor populations' health, creates an environmental damage, and increases the cost of water treatment for downstream users.

== Water management history and recent development ==
As in many other countries, water resources management in Brazil has historically relied upon heavy investment on hydraulic infrastructure. From building the first hydropower facility in 1901 until the mid-1970s, hydropower has been the main focus of water resources management. In 1934, after several modifications introduced to the first 1907 draft, the Water Code was approved. The Water Code was the first legislation for water resources management in Brazil, and was applied for more than 60 years. The Water Code ensured the free use of any water for basic life necessities and permitted everyone to use any public water while complying with administrative regulations. Some of its provisions, such as the polluter pays principle, were introduced long before this principle became globally recognized as a good practice.

The intention of reforming Brazil's water resources management system began to shape during the 1970s when other water users challenged the priority given to hydropower. Different initiatives and institutions for water management were established by the Federal Government and states such as São Paulo and Ceara. The Constitutional reform of 1988 was the first step in the creation of a National Water Law, whose responsibility was given to the Federal Government. The reformed Constitution also established a distinction between federally controlled water, for rivers across state boundaries, and state-controlled water, for rivers and groundwater that remained completely within state boundaries. Based on this new responsibility, the states began to implement their own water resources management systems. São Paulo pioneered this process in 1991 (see Water management in the Metropolitan Region of São Paulo). Today 25 of Brazil's 26 states and the Federal District have adopted legislation to modernize water resource management (see States of Brazil).

After negotiating for six years, the Federal Government approved the 1997 National Water Law (No. 9433) aimed at incorporating modern water resources management principles and instruments into Brazil's water resources management system. A National Water Authority was created in 2000 aimed at implementing the National Water Law. Numerous local, regional, and national initiatives, public and private bodies, and technical, scientific, and professional associations also play a role in Brazil's water resources management system.

== Water resource base ==
=== Surface and ground water resources ===
Brazil has always been considered a country rich in water. It is estimated that about 12% of the world's surface water resources are located in the country. In 2007, per capita water availability reached 43,027 m^{3} per year, above the world average of 8,209 m^{3} per capita in the same year. However, this impressive average masks an extremely uneven distribution of water resources among regions.

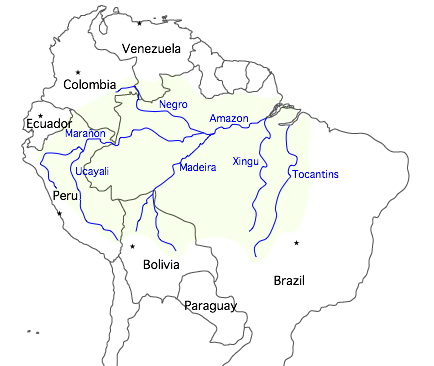
Amazon River basin

The Amazon river basin alone, which covers 48% of the country's territory, accounts for 75% of Brazil's freshwater resources but has only 4% of its population. The most dramatic departure from abundance can be found in the Northeast region, which includes most of the country's semi-arid region. Accounting for 18% of Brazil's territory and about 28% of its population, the Northeast region has only 5% of the country's water resources and is subject to recurrent, severe droughts, harvest failures, and food shortages. With 73% of the country's population, 11% of its territory, and about 10% of its water resources, the Southeast is the heart of Brazil's industrial economy and also has the highest agricultural production

Brazil has three river basins (the Amazon, Tocantins, and São Francisco), and two basin complexes, the Plata River which has three Brazilian sub-basins (Paraná, Upper Paraguay, and Uruguay), and the remaining rivers flowing into the Atlantic which are divided into several basins. The Amazon and the Tocantins-Araguaia basins in the north account for 56 percent of Brazil's total drainage area. The Amazon River, the world's largest river in volume of water and second longest after the Nile, is navigable by ocean steamers as far as Iquitos in Peru. The São Francisco River is the largest river entirely within Brazil, flowing for over 1,609 km northward before it turns eastward into the Atlantic. The last 277 km of the lower river is navigable for ocean-going ships. The Paraná-Paraguay river system drains the southwestern portion of the state of Minas Gerais. Brazil's two southernmost states partially drain into the Uruguay River which flows into the Plata River. The inflow of the Amazon to Brazil is 1.9 BCM per year, so that the total surface water resources in the country reach, on average, 8.2 BCM per year

Basin Name	Surface Area (1000 km^{2})	Precipitation (mm/year)	Evapotranspiration (mm/year)
Amazon Basin	3935	8735.7	4918.8
Tocantins-Araguaia	757	1256.6	884.2
North and Northeast	1029	1533.0	1239.6
San Francisco	634	580.7	490.7
East Atlantic	634	321.0	246.2
Parana-Paraguay	1245	2139.9	1656.7
Uruguay	178	278.9	148.1
Southeast Atlantic	224	312.3	176.7
TOTAL	8547	15158.1	9761.0

Source: FAO

The volume of stored groundwater in Brazil less than 1,000 m deep and with good quality for human uses is estimated at 112,000 km^{3}, with highly variable extraction rates. In Brazil, groundwater is used in rural areas for domestic water supply and irrigation on a moderate scale. Estimates indicate that approximately 300,000 wells are being used, and over 10,000 more are drilled every year. On a large scale, groundwater is beginning to be used in areas where the surface water sources are scarce, where they are heavily used, or where their use is problematic due to heavy water pollution (Central and Southern Brazil).

=== Storage capacity and infrastructure ===
The varies by regions. The northeastern state of Ceará, with 7,227 dams, has a cumulative maximum storage capacity of 11 billion cubic meters. However, losses from surface evaporation are equivalent to a large part of the annual inflow to the reservoirs due to arid climate conditions and shallow reservoirs The Amazon River is extremely wide for most of its length, so most of the dams are located on its tributaries. The Tucurui dam, located on the Tocantins River in the Northeastern region, has a capacity of 110 BCM and a generating capacity of 8,000 MW.

=== Water quality ===
Sewage is a major cause of water pollution in Brazil, a major problem that undermines quality of life, health, and economic development in large metropolitan areas and has a disproportionate impact on the poor in the slums surrounding Brazil's largest cities. According to the 2000 National Survey of Sanitary Conditions (PNSB), less than 10% of the wastewater produced in urban areas is treated. The 2000 PNSB was the latest survey of water supply for human consumption and wastewater collection and treatment conducted nationwide. Water quality management is also undertaken by the states, although the quality of their water monitoring systems and surveys varies widely. In 2006, only nine Brazilian states had water quality monitoring systems that were rated as excellent or very good; five had good or fair systems; and thirteen had weak systems.

The southeastern State of São Paulo, with a monitoring system considered very good, registered in its latest study high microbiological indexes indicative of pollution from domestic sewage both upstream and downstream in the Bairro da Serra River and even higher rated from two its main tributary streams.

== Water resources management by sector ==
=== Water supply and sanitation ===
Domestic consumption accounts for 21% of water withdrawals in Brazil. The water and sanitation sector in Brazil has proved to be resilient and resourceful, despite tremendous challenges and persistent inequalities in the sector. Much has been achieved in the past decades, including a sustained improvement in efficiency and access. Access to improved water supply increased from 93 % in 1990 to 90% in 2004, and access to improved sanitation increased from 71% to 75%.

=== Irrigation and drainage ===
About 61% of all water withdrawal in Brazil is used for irrigation, which is lower than the average water withdrawal for irrigation in Latin America, 71%. The irrigated area in 1998 was 2.8 million ha, which represents 5.7% of the cultivated area. The irrigation potential of Brazil is estimated at 29.3 million ha, including only areas where irrigation can be developed and excluding areas of high ecological value in the northern region (Amazonas and Tocantins basins). The Ineffective irrigation has generated salinization and drainage problems in 15,000 ha, mostly in the northeast (of a total irrigated area of 736,000 hectares), jeopardizing these lands' productivity.

=== Hydropower ===
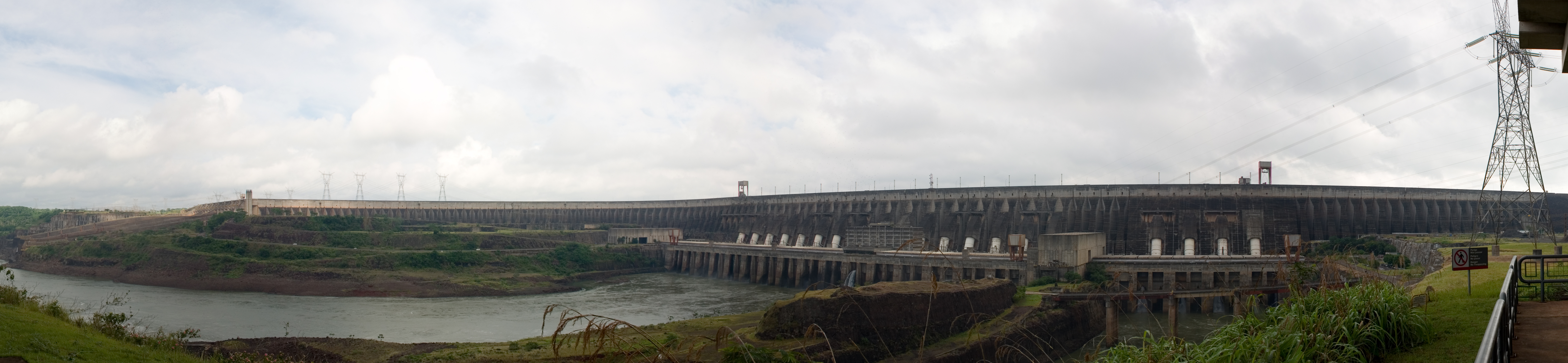
Panoramic view of the Itaipu Dam, with the spillways (closed at the time of the photo) on the left

Access to electricity has increased from fewer than 500 kilowatt hours (kW·h) per capita in 1970 to more than 2,000 kW·h per capita in 2000. These results have been achieved mainly through the development of hydropower, which currently accounts for 81% of Brazil's installed capacity (69 gigawatts out of a total of 79).

Brazil also has the largest hydroelectric power plant in operation in the world, the Itaipú Dam which was built from 1975 to 1991, in a joint development on the Paraná River. Its 18 generating units add up to a total production capacity of 12,600 MW (megawatts) and a reliable output of 75 million MWh a year, providing 25% of the energy supply in Brazil and 78% in Paraguay (in 1995).

=== Aquatic ecosystems ===
Brazil has more freshwater fish species than any other country on earth, with the world's largest river basin, the Amazon, and the world's largest tropical floodplain, the Pantanal. In the Amazon River alone, there are an estimated 2,000 species of fish, more than all in North America.

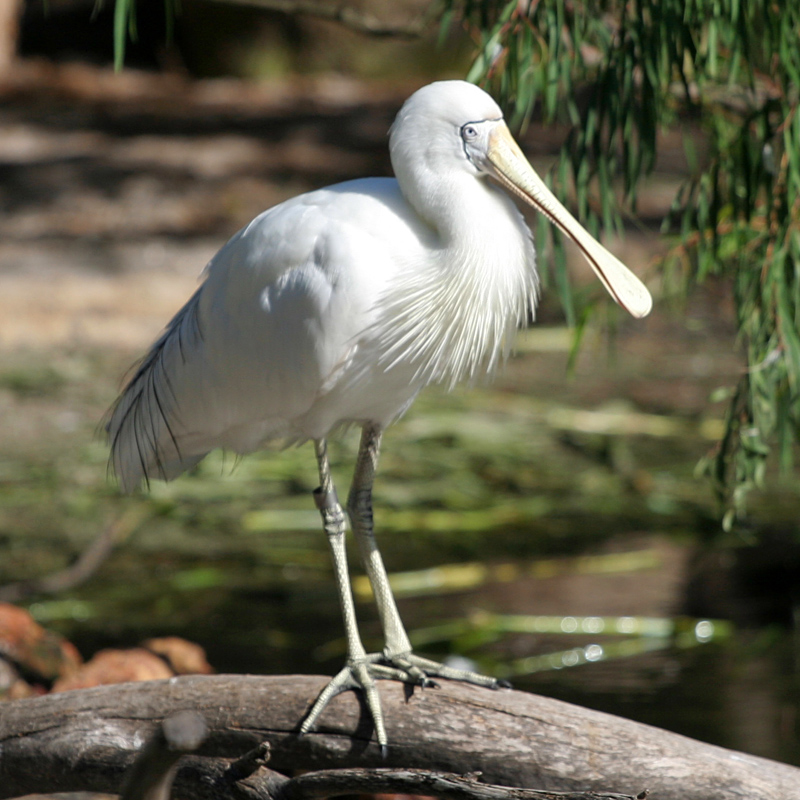
Yellow-billed spoonbill

The Pantanal covers at least 140,000 square kilometers of land, over four times the size of the Florida Everglades in North America. There are an estimated 700 species of birds, including spoonbills, and 26 species of parrots, including the endangered hyacinth macaw. The Pantanal is also home to the capybara, the world's largest rodent. Fish thrive in this wetland environment (over 260 species have been noted). Illegal poaching, deforestation, overfishing, pollution from human sewage, agricultural pesticides, and metal pollutants are taking an increasing environmental toll on the area.

In 2007, Brazil had identified nine sites that fulfill criteria for wetlands of international importance according to the Ramsar Convention, seven of which are mainland wetlands. They include three National Parks: one in the Pantanal (Parque Nacional do Pantanal Mato-Grossense); one in the Araguaia (Parque Nacional do Araguaia); and one in the Peixe Lagoon (Parque Nacional da Lagoa do Peixe); two Environmental Protection Areas in the State of Maranhão (Área de Proteção Ambiental da Baixada Maranhense and the Área de Proteção Ambiental das Reentrâncias Maranhenses); a Private Wetlands Reserve in the Pantanal (Reserva Particular do Patrimônio Natural SESC Pantanal); and the Mamirauá Sustainable Development Reserve (Reserva de Desenvolvimento Sustentável Mamirauá).

In 2006, the Government of Brazil approved its first Freshwater Management Plan, assuring that aquatic biodiversity will be an important aspect of freshwater planning for the entire country. With this plan, Brazil's Government explicitly made biodiversity a part of the decision-making process for the use of the country's freshwater resources.

== Legal and institutional framework ==
=== International legal framework ===
Brazil has signed numerous treaties with neighboring countries, aimed at promoting sustainable use of shared water resources. The Treaty of the Rio de la Plata entered into force in 1977 and is working as a political interconnection among the countries of the Southern Cone (Argentina, Brazil, Bolivia, Paraguay, and Uruguay). Its main objectives are the sustainable use of water resources; regional development with preservation of flora and fauna; physical, fluvial, and terrestrial integration; and promotion of greater knowledge of the basin, its resources and potential.

The Amazon Cooperation Treaty (TCA) was signed in 1978 by Brazil, Colombia, Ecuador, Guyana, Peru, Suriname, and Venezuela and entered into force for Brazil in 1980. The basic scope of the TCA is to promote the harmonious development of the Amazon, in order to allow an equitable distribution of the benefits, to improve the quality of life of its peoples, and to achieve the full incorporation of their Amazon territories in their respective domestic economies.

Other treaties include: (i) the Cooperation Agreement for the Use of Natural Resources and Development of the Quaraí River Basin; and (ii) the Treaty for the Use of Shared Natural Resources of the Bordering Stretches of the Uruguay River and its tributary, the Pepiri-Guaçú River, between Brazil and Argentina.

=== National legal framework ===

The 1988 Constitution established a distinction between federally controlled water, for rivers, lakes, and lagoons across state boundaries (article 20), and state-controlled water, for rivers and groundwater that remain completely within state boundaries (article 26). This definition of state-controlled water complicates the effective management of some of the country's important rivers since the main stem of a federally controlled river cannot be effectively managed without controlling water resource development on the state-controlled tributaries of the river.

After negotiating for six years, Congress adopted a National Water Law, No. 9433 (NWL) in January 1997 that incorporates most modern water resources management principles and instruments. The NWP states that water is a public good and a limited natural resource with an economic value; in situations of scarcity the priority use of water is for human and animal consumption; water resources management should always assure the multiple use of waters; the river basin is the territorial unit for water management; and management of water resources should be decentralized and participatory. In July 2000, Federal Law No. 9984 established the National Water Authority (Autoridade Nacional da Agua - ANA) with the mandate to implement the national water policy and establish criteria for granting of water usage rights and pricing mechanisms.

The legal framework is completed with several water resources management laws created by the states starting in 1991. Although implemented at different times in the last 20 years, most of these state laws are structurally very similar among themselves and with National Water Law No. 9433.

State water resources management Law

State	Law No.	Enactment date
São Paulo	7,663	December 1991
Ceara	11,996	July 1992
Para	5,793	January 1994
Santa Catarina	9,748	November 1994
Acre	1,117	January 1994
Minas Gerais	11,504	June 1994
Rio Grande do Sul	10,530	December 1994
Bahia	6,855	May 1995
Rio Grande do Norte	6,908	July 1996
Paraiba	6,308	July 1996
Union	9,433	January 1997
Pernambuco	11,426	January 1997
Goias	13,123	July 1997
Sergipe	3,870	September 1997
Mato Grosso	6,945	November 1997
Alagoas	5,965	November 1997
Maranhao	7,052	December 1997
Espirito Santo	5,818	December 1998
Rio de Janeiro	3,239	August 1999
Parana	12,726	November 1999
Piaui	5,165	August 2000
Distrito Federal	2,725	June 2001

Source: MMA, 2001

=== Institutional organization ===
The National Water Resources Management System is a combination of organized public organizations, private entities, and civil society representatives which make the implementations of the water resources management instruments possible, in accordance with the principles established in the law. The institutional framework consists of the following:

The National Council on Water Resources (NCWR) is the highest organization in the system's hierarchy. It aims at promoting the integration of water resources planning at the national, regional, and state levels and between user sectors. The NCWR consists of representatives of the Federal Government ministries as well as representatives designated by the State Councils on Water Resources and representatives of water users and civil organizations concerned with water resources management. The Chairman of the National Water Resources Council is the Minister of the Environment.

The National Water Authority (Autoridade Nacional da Agua – ANA) is in charge of implementing the National Plan for Water Resources formulated by the NCWR. ANA consists of ten functional superintendencies with implementing and administrative functions headed by a president and four directors. ANA is under the Ministry of the Environment but has administrative and financial independence.

The River Basin Committees (RBC) are connected organizations that bring together stakeholders to discuss and decide on their own problems with the objective of protecting water resources in the river basin region. Under Brazilian law, they do not have legal status. RBCs include representatives of the Federal Government, the states, or the Federal District in which they are located (even if only partially), the municipalities, the water users and the water resources civil organizations that have a demonstrated record of action in the basin. The number of representatives from each sector mentioned, as well as the criteria for their appointments, are defined in the regulations of the Committees.

The River Basin Water Agencies act as the executive secretariats of the River Basin Committees. Although there is a close relationship between the committees and the agencies, the latter are very different from the former. The main difference is in their nature and organization: while the Committees act as what is called in Brazil "water parliaments," the Water Agencies operate more like executive organizations.

The Water Resources Civil Organizations (CWO) should be represented on the National Water Resources Council and should participate in the decision-making process. CWOs can be any of the following: (i) inter-municipal consortia, (ii) river basin associations, (iii) regional, local, or sectoral associations of water users, (iv) technical, academic, and research organizations, and (v) nongovernmental organizations (NGOs).

=== Government strategy ===
The National Water Resources Policy was approved by Federal Law No. 9433/97. The National Water Resources Policy can be divided into three main sections:

- Sector Principles. These are: (i) the river basin is the territorial unit for the implementation of the National Water Resources Policy; (ii) management of water resources should allow for multiple uses of water; (iii) water is a limited resource with economic value; (iv) the management of water resources should be decentralized and should involve participation by the government, the users, and the community; and (v) when there is a shortage of water, priority is given to human consumption and watering of animals.
- Management Instruments affecting water users directly, such as water permits and water tariffs, and decision-making, such as water resources planning at the river basin, state, or national level, water resources information system and classification of bodies of water according to main uses.
- The institutional framework for the operation of the principles and implementation of the instruments, including: (i) National Water Resources Council, (ii) the water resources councils of the states and the Federal District, (iii) the river basin committees, (iv) the government agencies with functions related to water, and (v) the river basin water agencies.

In addition, Brazil's Government is undertaking a number of water resources management initiatives such as PROAGUA and PRODES. PROAGUA (Programa Nacional de Desenvolvimiento dos Recursos Hidricos - Federal Water Resources Management Project) aims at bettering the population's quality of life, especially that of the poor, by combining integrated water resources management with expansion and optimization of hydraulic infrastructure, promoting rational integrated and sustainable use and participatory management of water resources in Brazil. PRODES (Programa Despoluição de Bacias Hidrográficas or Basin Restoration Program) is an innovative program by the Brazilian Federal Government to finance wastewater treatment plants while providing financial incentives to properly operate and maintain the plants. It is a type of Output-based aid, as opposed to financing programs targeted only at inputs.

=== Users' Commissions ===
More recently, the advent of river basin or sub-basin commissions has changed the terms of the debate over the "ideal scale" of water services provision.

The creation of Users’ Commissions, such as COGERH (created in 1993) in the Lower Jaguaribe/Banabuiú, and a (short-lived) similar organization in Curú, have served the overlapping goals of public participation, decentralization, and transparency. According to Lemos and de Oliveira, such Users' Commissions have effectively mobilized "multidisciplinary" teams of experts—including sociologists, geographers, agronomists, and engineers—"not as organizers but as facilitators," for more participatory decision-making processes.

The river basin committees represent a "new decision-making" arena which has begun to challenge the " =closed and technocratic" bureaucracy that Brazil inherited from its pre-democratic past. For example, COGERH's recommendation to reduce water consumption voluntarily came as a shock to the traditional water policy-making establishment. The Piracicaba, Capivari, and Jundiaí River Basin Committee (created by Law No. 7663/1991, formalized by November 1993) pioneered a shared decision-making model between users and state and local officials, which has been used as a model by several other committees in the state of São Paulo.

== Water management at the river basin level – The Alto Tietê river basin ==
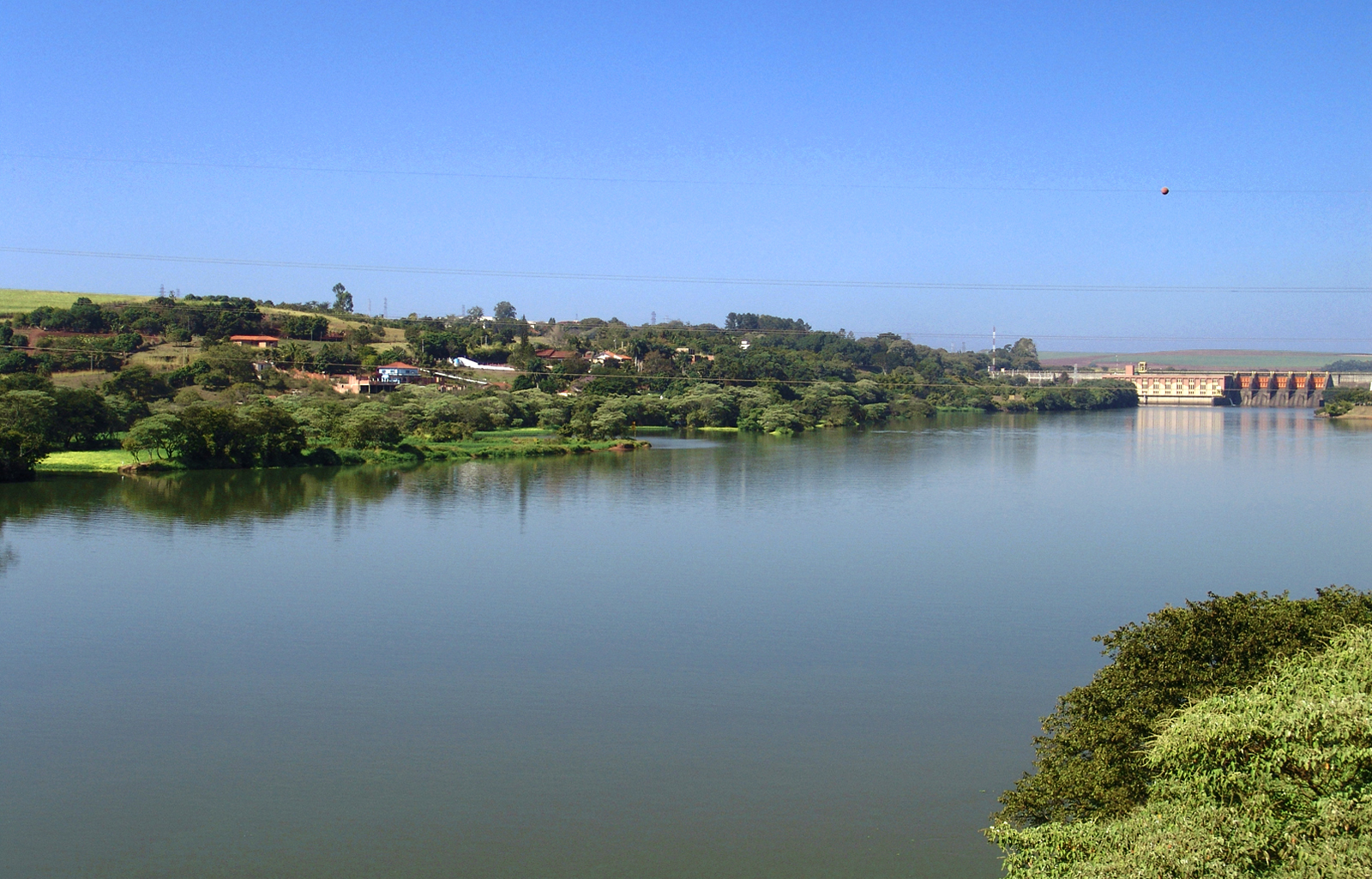
Rio Tietê

See also:Water management in the Metropolitan Region of São Paulo
Unlike the semi-arid region which has had a long history of federal intervention, water management practices in the State of São Paulo have historically been a local affair, even for the federal waters crossing it. The Tietê River —the State of São Paulo's largest river— runs 1,100 km from its eastern source in the São Paulo Metropolitan Region to the western border of the state where it joins the Paraná River, which then runs southward toward the Rio de la Plata estuary between Argentina and Uruguay. The area covered by the Alto Tietê basin is almost coterminous with the Metropolitan Region of São Paulo. With a drainage area of 5,985 km^{2} (2.4% of the state's territory), the basin encompasses 35 of the 39 municipalities and 99.5% of the population of Greater São Paulo.

In 1991, Law 7.663 was enacted calling for the creation of the Alto-Tietê Basin Committee. However this committee was only formally established in November 1994, a result of a deliberate effort by the state técnicos (technical staff) to mobilize the municipal government and, especially, civil society. Its functions include setting guidelines and approving river basin plans; proposing pricing criteria and values for bulk water pricing and a program for allocating proceeds derived from such water charges; integrating the decision-making and programs of water-related institutions working in the basin; and other responsibilities. The 48 seats of the committee's assembly are divided equally among representatives of three sectors: municipal government, state government agencies (including public water users), and organized civil society groups (including those representing private water users). Local issues are decided in the five sub-committees created after 1997. Although the Alto-Tietê Committee created its basin agency in 2001, it is little more than a symbolic organization, while the state water management agency remains the committee's executive arm in charge of technical and administrative support.

As elsewhere in São Paulo, fully working basin institutions have yet to be created in the Alto Tietê Basin, mostly because the financial vitality of these bodies remains very limited. All in all, the Alto Tietê management system can be characterized as reasonably advanced, even though the rhythm of implementation has been much slower than the initial process of approving the water law and creating the basin committees.

== Bulk water tariffs ==
In 1999, no water fees were charged for the use of water for irrigation or for water supply in Brazil. In the hydroelectric subsector, a royalty fee (based on a percentage of the revenues collected by power companies) is paid to those states and municipalities where hydroelectric infrastructure and facilities are located. Water users in urban centers pay for the treatment and distribution of water and the collection of sewage, whereas farmers in public irrigation projects pay a tariff for the O&M of the projects.

The establishment of bulk water tariffs is currently one of the most emphasized pricing mechanisms in Brazil. However, the actual implementation of bulk water supply tariffs varies by state. For example, in the State of Ceara, prices for industrial users are 60 times higher than those for municipal users, who in turn pay as much as 10 times as that paid by agricultural users.

Bulk water pricing structure in Ceara

	Current prices (US$/1,000 m^{3})	Estimated annual revenue (US$ million)	Proposed Prices (US$/1,000m3)	Estimated Annual Revenue (US$ million)
Industrial	545.50	100	663.60	121.65
Municipal	9.10	250	11.10	304.95
Irrigation, aquaculture, and others	--	150	12.20	185.78
Total	554.60	500	686.9	619.27

Source: World Bank, 1999

== Water-related natural hazards ==
Droughts In the Northeast of Brazil droughts are a cyclical phenomenon occurring every 10 to 12 years, and some of them are very severe. The region has an annual average rainfall ranging from 400 to 800 mm, and an average water availability per person ranging from 1,320 to 1,781 m^{3} (the world's average was 8,209 m^{3} in 2007). The effects of droughts on the local, mostly poor, population are devastating. Droughts are also frequent in the South, home of most of Brazil's industry, where the latest drought in 2000 culminated in a national energy crisis. (See Electricity sector in Brazil).

Floods Along the Amazon River there is a complex mosaic of fluvial forms, including channels, active sandbars, islands, levees, scroll-dominated plains, and abandoned belts highly prone to floods in the summer months. Hydrological variability and rapidly growing urban areas have caused new environmental problems in Brazilian cities, such as inundations in non-planned river basins. One of the causes of flood impacts is that public funds (national, state, or municipal) have barely introduced wise proactive policies to follow up rapidly growing urban areas.

== Potential climate change impacts ==
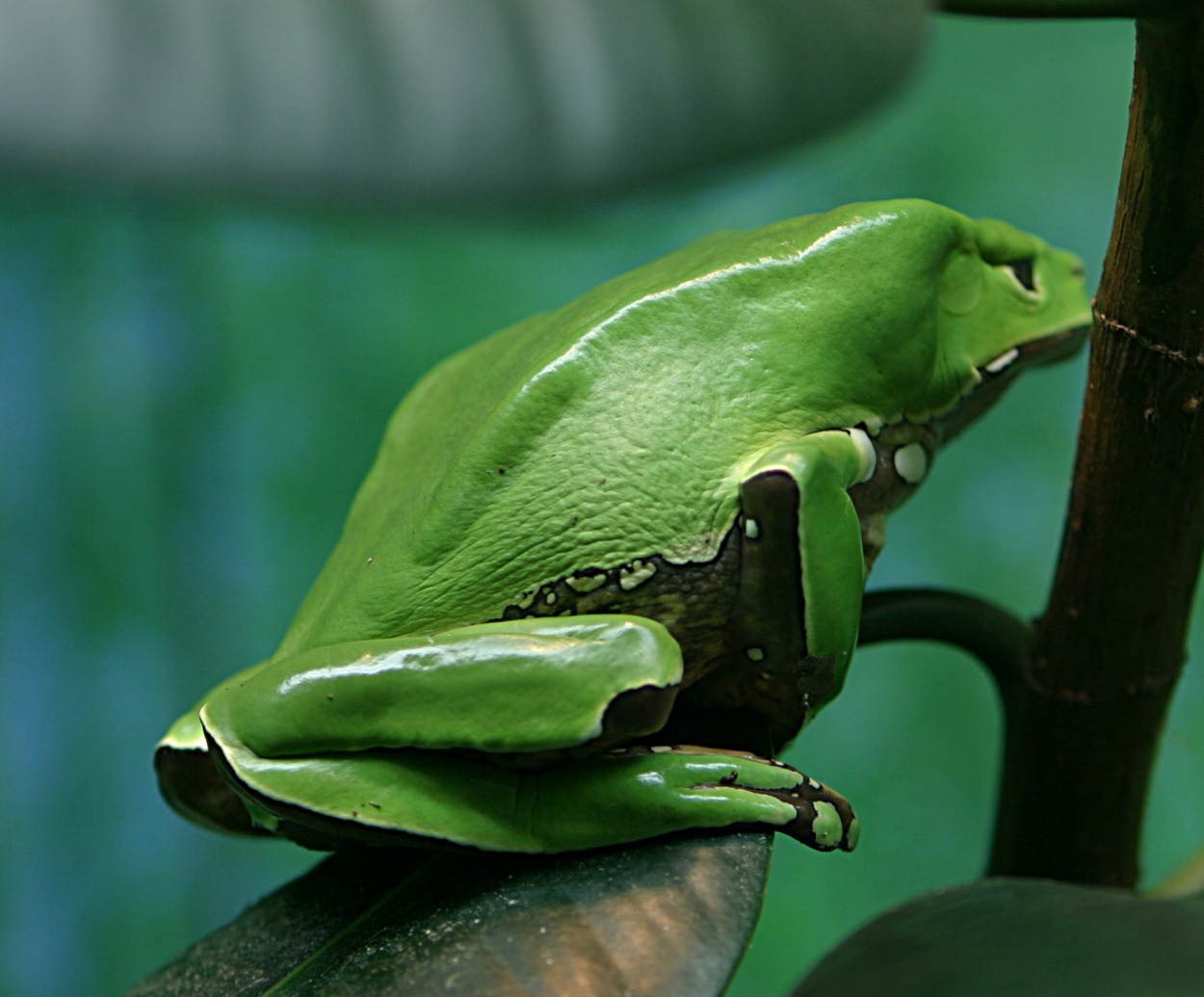
Deforestation in the Amazon Rainforest threatens many species of tree frogs, which are very sensitive to environmental changes (pictured: giant leaf frog)

Brazil's Government considers that, despite many studies, there is still much uncertainty about the consequences of climate change and its links to worsening critical events. On the other hand, the Technical Summary of the Fourth Assessment Report of the UNFCC, reflecting a consensus view, indicates a potential Amazon forest loss of between 20 and 80% as a result of climate impacts induced by a temperature increase in the basin of between 2.0 and 3.0 degrees Celsius. The IPCC is also indicating a likelihood of major biodiversity extinctions as a consequence. Specifically, according to the Earth Simulator, temperature increases and disruption in precipitation cycles (up to a 90% reduction by the end of the century) could seriously hamper the workings of the Amazon as a forest ecosystem, reducing its capacity to retain carbon, increasing its soil temperature, and eventually forcing the Amazon through a gradual process of savannization. These predictions were reinforced in 2005, when large sections of southwestern Amazonia experienced one of the most intense droughts of the last hundred years. The drought severely affected human population along the main channel of the Amazon River and its western and southwestern tributaries.

== External cooperation ==
The World Bank is contributing US$1.2 million to assess the prospects and identification of the implications of Amazon dieback induced by climate change (overall, called "global warming") as well as assessing the long-term options that would be required to maintain the integrity of the basin. The World Bank is also collaborating with Brazil's Government on two projects for integrated water resources management in Rio Grande do Norte and Ceara. The World Bank also contributed US$198 million to the Federal Water Resources Management Project, PROAGUA, in 1998.

The Inter-American Development Bank has contributed technically and financially to the development of Brazil's National Water Plan. The National Water Plan aims at assuring water quality, quantity, and availability needed for Brazil's sustainable development. The IDB has also contributed to the governments of states such as Santa Catarina and Rio Grande do Sul in the preparation of a Master Plan for the Sustainable Development of the Region of the Upper Rio Uruguay Watershed.

== See also ==
- Electricity sector in Brazil
- Irrigation in Brazil
- Peak water
- Water supply and sanitation in Brazil
- 2015 Brazilian drought
