= Water supply and sanitation in Pernambuco =

Water supply and sanitation in Pernambuco is characterized by high levels of access to water supply in urban areas, but also by poor service quality (intermittent supply), inadequate access to sanitation, and insufficient access to improved water sources and improved sanitation in rural areas.

In urban areas, where 76% of Pernambuco's 8.4 million inhabitants live, access to house connections for water supply is 91% and access to sewerage is 49%. Concerning service quality, rationing is a constant reality in about 85% of the municipalities, including the Recife Metropolitan Region. This is primarily to a lack of water resources, particularly during the dry season, and frequent drought conditions.

The State Secretariat of Water Resources is in charge of both water resources management and water supply and sanitation policies. The State Water Company (COMPESA) is responsible for water and sanitation service provision in most of the state. COMPESA provides urban water supply and sewerage in 170 and 20 municipalities respectively, out of 189 in the State. The remaining municipalities are served by municipal public providers. COMPESA operates under concession contracts with municipalities and is regulated and supervised by the state-level multi-sector regulatory agency ARPE.

The city of Recife has pioneered condominial sewers in Brazil.

== See also ==
- Water supply and sanitation in Brazil
