= PRODES =

PRODES (Programa Despoluição de Bacias Hidrográficas, or "Basin Restoration Program") is an innovative program by the Brazilian federal government to finance wastewater treatment plants while providing financial incentives to properly operate and maintain the plants. It is a type of output-based aid, as opposed to financing programs targeted only at inputs.

The program was introduced in 2001 and is managed by the National Water Agency ANA. Under it, the federal government pays utilities (mostly public state or municipal water and sanitation companies) for treating wastewater based on certified outputs. Up to half the investment costs for wastewater treatment plants are eligible to be reimbursed over three to seven years, provided that the quality of the wastewater discharged meets the norms. If the norms are not met in one trimester, a warning is issued. If they are not met in the following trimester, the payment is suspended. If the norms are still not met in the next trimester, the service provider is excluded from the program. This provides strong incentives to properly operate and maintain plants. In short, the program does not fund promises, but results.

The program enhances the financial viability of utilities and thus increases their ability to access commercial credit, through development banks (such as the Caixa Economica Federal) as well as commercial banks. The operational risk is clearly assigned to the service provider, who is best able to manage that risk. In order to prevent over-investment, the treatment plants have to be included in basin plans adopted by water basin agencies as a necessary condition to be eligible for financing under the program.

Between 2001 and 2007, PRODES leveraged investments of US$290 million with subsidies and subsidy commitments of US$94 million, financing 41 wastewater treatment plants in 32 cities serving 2 million people. The program had a portfolio of 52 other projects to be financed serving 5.7 million people. Geographically, the projects are concentrated in the southeast of Brazil, the country's most urbanized region with the most serious pollution problems.

In terms of background, financing and cost recovery for urban sanitation is a challenge throughout the world. Many utilities do not levy separate tariffs for sanitation. Where such charges exist they are usually insufficient to finance operation and maintenance costs, not to speak of capital costs. This problem is particularly acute in countries that embark on ambitious investment programs to increase the coverage of wastewater treatment. The challenge is to devise programs to channel subsidies while promoting efficiency as well as operational and environmental sustainability. PRODES is an interesting case where a program has been introduced that fits these criteria.

== See also ==
- Water supply and sanitation in Brazil
- Water resources management in Brazil

== Sources ==
- ANA PRODES
- World Bank Mexico Infrastructure Expenditure Review 2006 - ANNEX A: PAYMENT FOR ENVIRONMENTAL SERVICES IN WASTEWATER TREATMENT – AN EXAMPLE OF PERFORMANCE-BASED TRANSFERS
