= Sabesp =

Brazilian sanitation company

Companhia de Saneamento Básico do Estado de São Paulo S.A (Sabesp)
- Type: Sociedade Anônima
- Traded as: B3: SBSP3; NYSE: SBS; Ibovespa Component
- Industry: Waste management
- Founded: 29 June 1973; 53 years ago
- Headquarters: São Paulo, Brazil
- Key people: Edson de Oliveira Giriboni, (Chairman); Jerson Kelman, (CEO)
- Products: Water; Waste services
- Revenue: ▲US$ 4.4 billion (2017)
- Net income: ▼US$ 754.3 million (2017)
- Number of employees: 14,980
- Website: www.sabesp.com.br

Sabesp is a Brazilian water and waste management company headquartered in São Paulo. It provides water and sewage services to residential, commercial and industrial users in São Paulo and in 363 of the 645 municipalities in São Paulo State, typically under 30-year concession contracts. It provides water to 26.7 million customers, or 60% of the population of the state. It is the largest water and waste management company in Latin América. It provides basic sanitation services, which include all phases (abstraction, treatment, processing, distribution) and the collection, treatment and reuse of sewage. The São Paulo Metropolitan Region and the Regional Systems accounted for 74.5% and 25.5% of the sales and services rendered during the year ended December 31, 2004 respectively. Sabesp also supplies water on a bulk basis to municipalities in the São Paulo Metropolitan Area, in which it does not operate water systems to local operators.

In 2009 Sabesp had 15,103 employees for 7.12 million water connections, corresponding to 2.1 employees per 1,000 connections, indicating a high level of labor productivity.

SABESP was founded on Friday, 29 June 1973. Its stocks were first floated on the São Paulo stock exchange in 1996. In 2002-2004 the São Paulo Government sold a further equity stakes, including a listing at the New York Stock Exchange. Today 49.8% of its shares are privately owned. In 2006 a law was passed that allowed SABESP to expand its activities into other Brazilian states and internationally. It has signed cooperation agreements in Spain, Israel and Costa Rica. According to its CEO SABESP wants to expand to serve all cities in São Paulo State.

Sabesp provides water to millions of residents in São Paulo. However, the company faces problems such as the water leakage in their pipeline system that supplies water to the population.

== Water leakage ==
Water systems suffer water losses, and a significant cause is a leakage in the pipelines. There are numerous leaks and ruptures in the water pipeline system that affects the entire flow of the water. The city of São Paulo loses more than 20 percent of its treated water, ready for distribution due to the leaking in the pipes. Sabesp describes the water loss as physical or actual loss and non-physical or apparent loss. Physical loss is the volume of water that was lost through the pipe leakages and could not be consumed by the population. These leaks occur due to the high pressure in the pipes and the aging of those pipes. Non-physical losses are the volume of water consumed by the population without being accounted for by the company. People consume water with different fraud measures. The water losses in the water system can be linked with the irregularity done by the company in maintaining the installed infrastructures and the operation and flow of the water system. While the average production of the company was 64 meters cubed per second, the water loss was 20.6 meter cubed per second. Out of 40 percent of what is produced, 10 percent corresponds to fraud, 10 percent to the non-physical losses, and the remaining 20 percent correspond to actual water leaks.

With significantly high water losses through leakages in the water pipes, Sabesp has adopted various ways of managing and minimizing water loss. They have implemented rezoning in 5 sectors per year along with renewing and upgrading 12.5 percentage of the residential meters in the system per year. A significant initiative of reducing water leakage by Sabesp is by lowering the water pressure in the system. The old pipes cannot hold the high demand of the water flow during the peak hours and end up leaking. By reducing the water pressure, this minimizes the velocity of the water flow, thereby minimizing the leakage and water loss.

== Controversy during the 2014 Water Crisis ==
One of the leading factors into the 2014 Water Crisis was the mismanagement of water resources by SABESP in the Metropolitan Area of São Paulo. Primarily, through the lack of investing in infrastructure. As mentioned above, SABESP suffers with water leakage through their piping. This was especially felt during the 2014 Water Crisis in São Paulo. Not only do they lack infrastructure strengths in dealing with water leakage, the original design of SABESP pipelines and water tanks is flawed. The original design includes water tanks that are unequally concentrated in central São Paulo. The hardest hit area during the Water Crisis was southern São Paulo in which a large portion only has one water tank. A way that SABESP has tried to offset this is by using Boosters and Pressure Reducing Valves. However, they have been only a short-term solution to a long-term problem. This is one of the leading reasons as to why the 2014 Water Crisis occurred.

During the Water Crisis of 2014, SABESP failed to warn their citizens by not telling them that they were rationing water resources. The lack of transparency was especially prevalent during the 2014 Water Crisis concerning the major bonuses given to higher ups despite the thousands who suffered from thirst.
