= Water resources management in Colombia =

- Withdrawals by sector 2000/2001: Domestic: 59%; Agriculture: 37%; Industry: 4%
- Renewable water resources: 2,132 km^{3} (1977–2001)
- Surface water produced internally: 2,112 km^{3}
- Groundwater recharge: 510 km^{3}
- Overlap shared by surface water and groundwater: 510 km^{3}
- Renewable water resources per capita: 49,017 m^{3} per year (2006)
- Hydropower generation: 81%

There is a long and established framework for water resources management in Colombia. The Environment Ministry and up to 33 Regional Authorities (the first one was created in 1954), are in charge of water resources management and policies at the national and regional and watershed level, respectively. Other sectoral ministries are in charge of water demand for energy, water supply and sanitation and water for irrigation.

Water resources availability per capita in Colombia was 45,408 cubic meters in 2007, way above the world's average of 8,209 in the same year and is particularly prone to flooding and landslides. Climate change is expected to highly affect highland Andean ecosystems, especially moorlands, due to increase in temperatures and aquifer-based freshwater supplies in insular and coastal areas due to sea level increases and saline intrusion.

Despite the developed legal and institutional framework for water resources management in Colombia, many challenges remain, including: (i) the consideration of water as an abundant resource affect the implementation of certain policies; (ii) fragmentation on water resources management responsibilities and lack of a consistent national strategy; (iii) some lack of coordination between the Environmental Ministry and the Regional Authorities; (iv) lack of capacities at the regional level; (v) governability challenges due to social and environmental issues such as deforestation, illegal crops, urban sprawl…etc.

== Water management history and recent developments ==
During the 20th Century, Colombian Government focused on increasing knowledge on natural resources as well as developing law and institutions to regulate their uses. For example, in 1952, the Government created the Division for Natural Resources, under the Environment Ministry, aimed at managing land, forestry and fisheries. In 1953, the Government enacted the Decree 1371, also known as the Sanitation Code, which included general rules to control residual water.

In 1954, the Government, following the model based on the Tennessee Valley Authority, established in the US in 1933, created the Cauca Regional Authority with the objective of managing land and water resources in a multisectoral and integrated way. For the next 50 years, up to 33 Regional Authorities (Corporaciones Autonomas Regionales –CARs) will be created all over Colombia each of them representing the highest authority for natural resources management, including water resources, within their territory and being an integral part of the National Environmental System in Colombia.

In 1968, the government created the National Institute of Renewable Natural Resources and Environment (INDERENA), encompassing the Division for Natural Resources and the Magdalena and Sinu Regional Authorities. During the 1970s, there was an intense institutional development with the creation of numerous sectoral entities such as the Meteorological Service in charge of analyzing meteorological and hydrological data, the Geographic Institute Agustin Godazzi in charge of land management, INGEOMINAS in charge of groundwater resources management, and Colombian Agricultural Institute in charge of assessing the environmental impacts of fertilizers and pesticides, among others. In addition, Regional Authorities advanced environmental tasks related to water and forestry management. For example, the Regional Authority of Cali and Yumbo was the first regional authority with the equipment and regulation necessary to control industrial discharges on water bodies.

In addition, the government together with INDERENA and the Food and Agriculture Organization collaborated during the 1970s in the creating of the National Code for Renewable Natural Resources and Environmental Protection, also known as the Natural Resources Code, which was finally enacted with Decree 2811 of 1974.

During the 1980s, Natural Resources Code and the 1979 National Sanitation Law were developed through numerous regulations such as the Watershed Decree 2857 of 1981, Atmospheric Releases Decrees 02 of 1982 and 2200 of 1983, and the Water Quality Decree 1594 of 1984.

The new constitution of 1991 included 49 articles for environmental and natural resources protection and was considered for some experts as the “Environmental Constitution.” Finally, Law 99 of 1993 established the current institutional framework in Colombia, in particular it: (i) turned the INDERENA into the Ministry of Environment (ii) created the National Environmental System (iii) established the Regional Authorities as the institutions in charge of implementing national policies and regulations; (iv) finally, included five research institutions into the National Environmental System, namely:

- Institute of Hydrology, Meteorology and Environmental Studies
- Alexander von Humboldt Biological Resources Research Institute
- José Benito Vives de Andréis Marine and Coastal Research Institute
- Amazonic Institute of Scientific Research
- John von Neumann Environmental Research Institute of the Pacific

== Water resource base ==
=== Surface and groundwater resources ===
According to FAO, Colombia has an annual average rainfall of 3,000mm, with an annual volume of 3,425 cubic kilometers (km^{3}). About 61% of which, or 2,113 km^{3}, represent annual run off. According to IDEAM, 40% of water supply is needed to maintain ecosystems and preserve them from impacts threatening water availability.

There are five drainage basins in Colombia, which main characteristics are summarized below.

Key Characteristics of the Drainage Basins

Drainage Basin	Drainage Surface km^{2}	Main Rivers	Average annual rainfall (mm)	Average annual run off (mm)
Caribbean	363,878	Magdalena, Cauca, Atrato, Sumapaz, Sogamoso, Saldana, Bogotá	300 to 2,500	487
Pacific	Patía, San Juan, Mira, Bandó, Dagua, Anchicayá	2,000 to 9,000	221	
Orinoquia	350,000	Meta, Guaviare, Arauca, Tomo, Vichada	1,000 to 5,500	662
Amazonia	343,000	Amazonas, Vaupés, Guanía, Paraná, Caquetá, Putumayo	2,550 to 3,500	694
Catatumbo	8,370	Sardinata, Zulia, Catumbo	1,000 to 2,500	14
Total	1,141,748	-	3,000	2078

Source: FAO

According to the Environment Ministry, groundwater resources have not been sufficiently documented in Colombia. There are studies reflecting potential groundwater resources in areas were groundwater is currently being used which represents only 15% of Colombia's territory.

=== Storage capacity and infrastructure ===
According to FAO, Colombia has 90 small dams with a total storage capacity of 3.4 km^{3} and 26 large dams (with a storage capacity of more than 25hm3) with a total capacity of 9.1 km^{3}. Colombia also has about 1,500 lakes with a storage capacity of 8 km^{3}.

=== Water quality ===
The gradual decrease in Colombia's water quality is due to the release of untreated effluents from agriculture, urban settlements and industries. According to Orlando and Arias, there is not a national water quality inventory but rather regional and sporadic studies. For instance the National Planning Division, in a study of 1989 and 1993, estimated that the level of organic material discharged in Colombian water resources is 9,000 BOD per day, of which 4,000 are discharged solely by the agricultural sector.

== Water resources management by sector ==
=== Drinking water and sanitation ===
Water supply and sanitation in Colombia has been improved in many ways over the past decades. Between 1990 and 2004, access to sanitation increased from 82% to 86%, but access to water increased only slightly from 92% to 93%.In particular, coverage in rural areas lags behind. Furthermore, despite improvements, the quality of water and sanitation services remains inadequate. For example, only 72% of those receiving public services receive water of potable quality and in 2006 only 25% of the wastewater generated in the country underwent any kind of treatment.

The World Economic Forum determined that Colombia's relative international position in water supply has dropped from the 4th position to the 24th in 27 years until 2017. Analyses made by the same institution predicts water shortages by 2050. Eight municipalities, including the greatly populated Pasto and Santa Marta, are expected to suffer the most from these shortages. Also, one fifth of the glaciers in Colombia has been reduced due to climate change in a 6-year period. In 2014, 318 municipalities were threatened by water shortages.

=== Irrigation and drainage ===
In 1991, Colombia had 750,513 hectares (ha) of irrigation or 11.4% of the total agricultural area (6.6 million ha). Public investment accounts for 287,454 ha, or 38% of irrigated area, while private investment accounts for the remaining 62%. Most of the irrigated areas are located in the warm center, Magdalena and Cauca Valleys, and the northeast near Venezuela's border and along the Caribbean coast. Cauca and Tolimas Valleys have 40% of irrigated land.

=== Hydropower ===
The electricity sector in Colombia is dominated by large hydropower generation (81% of production) and thermal generation (19%). Despite the country's large potential in new renewable energy technologies (mainly wind, solar and biomass), this potential has been barely tapped. A 2001 law designed to promote alternative energies lacks certain key provisions to achieve this objective, such as feed-in tariffs, and has had little impact so far. Large hydropower and thermal plants dominate the current expansion plans. The construction of a transmission line with Panama, which will link Colombia with Central America, is underway.

An interesting characteristic of the Colombian electricity sector (as well as of its water sector) is a system of cross-subsidies from users living in areas considered as being relatively affluent, and from users consuming higher amounts of electricity, to those living in areas considered as being poor and to those who use less electricity.

The electricity sector has been unbundled into generation, transmission, distribution and commercialization since sector reforms carried out in 1994. About half the generation capacity is privately owned. Private participation in electricity distribution is much lower.

== Legal and institutional framework ==
=== Legal framework ===
The water resources management legal framework consists of the following laws and regulations, presented in chronological order:

- Decree 2811 of 1974: Also known as the Natural Resources Code, establish on its Article 134 "it is responsibility of the State to guarantee water quality for human and other users."
- Law 09 of 1979: Also known as the National Sanitation Code, establish general norms and control procedures for water quality aimed at protecting human health. Article 10 establishes the basic framework for water discharge according to the rules and procedures enacted by the Health Ministry.
- Colombian Constitution of 1991: up to 43 articles define the mission of the national government regarding environmental issues and establish an action framework for environmental management, including water resources management.
- Law 99 of 1993: establishes the Environmental Ministry and organizes a new institutional framework, the National Environmental System. The Law 99 includes legal, institutional and financial considerations aimed at managing the environment in an effective and efficient way. Law 99 was intended to overhaul Colombia's previous environmental agencies and governance systems thoroughly, and thus lead to the creation of several new institutions and ministries dedicated to this cause. The institutions and ministries created included but were not limited to the Sistema Nacional Ambiental (SINA), the Ministerio de Ambiente y Desarrollo Sostenible (MADs), the Instituto de Investigación Marinas y Costeras (INVEMAR), and the Corporaciones Autónomas Regionales (CARs).

=== Institutional framework ===
The Ministry of Environment, Housing and Territorial Development, is in charge of environmental management in Colombia at the national level. The Ministry formulates water resources management policies and regulations including pollution standards and charge fees. It also manages protected areas and grants licenses to infrastructure projects.

The Ministerio de Ambiente y Desarrollo Sostenible (MADs) creates Colombia's environmental and water regulations. Amongst its duties is establishing fine rates, regulating pollution standards, and developing guidelines to review environmental license requests. The rules and regulations established by MADS are implemented on the regional level by CARs.

The Corporaciones Autónomas Regionales (CARs) are the institutions in charge of implementing national policies and regulations as well as managing natural resources and promote sustainable development within their boundaries. CARs are public institutions consisting on public and private territorial entities (NGOS, businesses, communities) sharing the same biogeography, hydro-geographic and geopolitical area as well as representatives of the Ministry and Presidency at the national level. They are administrative and financially independent, although they receive resources form the national government. CARs financial resources consist mainly on environmental taxes generated within their jurisdiction. There are currently 33 CARs in Colombia. The main functions of CARs in relation to water resources are: (i) allocating water resources to users; (ii) controlling water pollution for point and non-point sources; (iii) formulating and adopting Watershed Ordering Plans; and (iv) designing, financing and implementing activities for the protection of ecosystems. CARs are also responsible for the conservation of forests and other ecosystems such as wetlands related to the hydrological cycle.

The Instituto de Hidrologia, Meteorologia, y Estudios Ambientales (IDEAM) operates the national hydrological and meteorological network. The Decree No. 1729 of 2002 established two main responsibilities for IDEAM: (i) establishing criteria to classify and prioritize river basins; and (ii) creating a technical and scientific guide aimed at helping CARs in the creation of Watershed Ordering Plans. The guide was published in 2004 and IDEAM together with the Environment Ministry is in the process of creating a second part which will monitor the implementation of WRM in pilot river basins. IDEAM also keeps records of official national environmental data and is tasked with supplying this data to the other governmental institutions.

Finally, INVEMAR, as an investigative institution, has conducted various studies and research on Colombia's renewable resources as well as research on its marine and oceanic ecosystems. Together with IDEAM, INVEMAR support MADs with their research contributions, which have resulted in MADS being better equipped to develop and amend its environmental rules and regulations. Because CARs relies on the standards instituted by MADs, IDEAM, and INVEMAR are vital in maintaining Colombia's water management.

=== Government strategy ===
In 2002, Colombian government issued the Decree 1729 aimed at establishing water resource management at the river basin level including a timeframe and financial resources available for the elaboration of Watershed Ordering Plans (Planes Integrales de Ordenamiento y Manejo de Microcuencas – PIOM). IDEAM was responsible for elaborating a guide to inform river basing planning which was published in 2004. CARs are in charge of formulating and approving this plan in accordance with the steps included in IDEAM's technical guide, which are: Readiness, Diagnostic, Prospective, Formulation, Execution and Monitoring and Evaluation. CARs are granted with the responsibility to grant permits including water use and pollution, as well as submit to the municipal authorities' restrictions for land use.

=== International agreements ===
The Amazon Cooperation Treaty, signed in 1978 by Bolivia, Brazil, Colombia, Ecuador, Guyana, Peru, Suriname and Venezuela, aims at promoting sustainable use of natural resources, including water, in the Amazon Basin.

On 25 June 2005, after the approval of a US$700,000 grant by the Global Environment Fund the Amazon Cooperation Treaty Organization, the General Secretariat of the Organization of American States and the United Nations Development Program agreed to sign the Integrated and Sustainable Management of Transboundary Water Resources in the Amazon River Basin Considering Climate Variability and Change Project. The project aims to strengthen the institutional framework for planning and executing, in a coordinated and coherent manner, activities for the protection and sustainable management of water resources in the Amazon Basin in the face of impacts caused by human action and ongoing climatic changes being experienced in the Basin.

== Water pricing ==
Water use charges were established in Law 99 of 1993 and defined in Decree 155 of 2004. Water use charges have two components, minimum and regional. The minimum is established every year by the Ministry of Environment. The regional component consist of a number of elements such as water availability, socio-economic aspects, investment needed, opportunity cost and is established every year by the local CAR, who also collect the fee and have to be invested in the watershed according to the PIOM. Water use charges for the volume of water abstraction to all users who are granted water concessions.

== Environmental issues ==
=== Water related risks ===
Erosion is a natural phenomenon which can be aggravated by manmade situations increasing risks produced by landslides, flood, avalanches, mudfloods, etc.. Erosion impact are usually severe on dry areas, due to lack of vegetation. In Colombia, areas such as Cúcuta, Villa de Leyva, Tatacoa desert in Huila, Chicamocha canyon, La Guajira, Valle de Tenza, Valle Medio del Patía are especially vulnerable.

The Magdalena System, oriental valleys and Atratoa and Magdalena basins, delta waterways such as the Arauca, Grande de Santa Marta, and the Grande de Lorica wetland and the Mojana and Momposina areas are especially prone to floods and river overflow.

=== Potential climate change impacts ===
According to the first national communication to the United Nations Framework Convention on Climate Change, Colombia is highly vulnerable to the impacts of climate change. Highland Andean ecosystems, especially moorlands, are expected to be seriously affected by increase in temperature which has recorded a net increase of 0.2-0.3 degrees Celsius per decade during the period 1961-1990 – according to the Meteorological, Hydrological and Environmental Studies Institute—and is expected to continue to do so by the Meteorological Research Institute of Japan. Hydrological temperature changes would result in a loss of biodiversity and the services attached to those such as water supply, basin regulation and hydropower. Deforestation, in an attempt to increase the production of crops, has reduced water supply in recent years. 140,000 and 125,000 hectares of forest were destroyed in 2014 and 2015 respectively.

In addition, the National University of Colombia analyzed possible impacts of a doubling of the carbon dioxide emissions between the years 2050 to 2080 and projects a sea level rise of 2 to 5mm per year. Sea level increases will likely cause saline intrusion into aquifer-based freshwater supplies in insular and coastal areas. Freshwater systems and their biological diversity will be severely affected. Moreover, prognostic modeling of small islands has identified major land loss if no action is taken. For example, in San Andres Island, the first National Communications estimated a loss of 17% of land area, including most of the coastal zone by 2060 (50 cm increase in sea level).

Water is also at a very high demand due to the population growth of Colombia. Leaving issues of Water scarcity and water stress; where there is more water needed than the ecosystem can provide.

=== Ongoing programs and initiatives ===
In 2006, the World Bank contributed US$5.4 million, out of a total of US$14.9 million, for the creation of an Integrated National Adaptation Project to support Colombia's efforts to define and implement specific pilot adaptation measures and policy options to meet the anticipated impacts from climate change. These efforts will be focused on high mountain ecosystems, insular areas and on human health concerns related to the expansion of areas for vectors linked to malaria and dengue, as identified as priority areas in the National Communications and other studies.

In June 2008, the Inter-American Development Bank (IDB) approved a loan for US$100,000 for a project "Biodiversity and Climate Change: mainstreaming biodiversity conservation through avoided deforestation in the Andean-Amazon piedmont of Colombia." The project aims at developing methodologies and supporting pilot demonstrations on how to reliably measure carbon stored in standing forests. These efforts will enable national and local institutions to apply the methodology and implement mitigating measures to lower deforestation rates along the Pasto-Mocoa road, southern Colombia, in order to generate carbon credits for these mitigating actions.

On February 11, 2020, the government of Colombia reestablished the Consejo Nacional de Agua, the national water council. It was created in 2017; the focus of the council is to plan the necessary management of water resources across the Colombian territory. This space allows for efforts that favor sustainability of water resources. It too will be working to review the guidelines for comprehensive water resources management policy and adjust what is necessary to obtain the objectives set forth by the national development plan.

== See also ==
- Colombia
- Irrigation in Colombia
- Electricity sector in Colombia
- Water supply and sanitation in Colombia
