= Machuca (surname) =

Machuca is a Spanish and Portuguese surname. Notable people with the surname include:

- Alexis Machuca (born 1990), Argentine footballer
- Anggello Machuca (born 1984), Paraguayan footballer
- Brian Machuca (born 1995), Argentine footballer
- Elías Machuca (born 2003), Argentine footballer
- Imanol Machuca (born 2000), Argentine footballer
- Juan Machuca (born 1951), Chilean footballer
- Linda Machuca (politician), Ecuadorian politician and diplomat
- Linda Machuca (born 2001), Argentine freestyle wrestler
- Manuel Machuca (1924–1985), Chilean footballer
- Pedro Machuca (c. 1490–1550), Spanish architect
- Santiago Machuca (1929–2024), Puerto Rican sport shooter

== See also ==
- Juan R. Melecio Machuca, Puerto Rican lawyer
