= Andia =

Andia may refer to:

- Andia (singer) (born 1997 as Diana Constantin), Romanian singer
- Andia Range, a mountain in Spain, part of the Basque Mountains
- Andia (given name)
- Andia (surname)
