= Irrigation in Colombia =

- Land area: 1,109,500 km^{2}
- Agricultural land: 38%
- Cultivated area equipped for irrigation: 16.3%
- Irrigated area: 900,000 ha
- Systems: Sprinkler irrigation: 37,271 ha; Localized irrigation: 6,036 ha
- Share of irrigated agriculture in GDP: 11.5% (2007 est.)
- Annual investment in irrigation: 19 million USD (1991–1997)

Irrigation in Colombia has been an integral part of Colombia's agricultural and rural development in the 20th Century. Public investment in irrigation has been especially prominent in the first half of the Century. During the second half, largely driven by fiscal shortages and a common inability to raise sufficient revenues from collection of water charges, the Colombian government adopted a program to devolve irrigation management responsibility to water users associations. Irrigation management transfer has occurred only partially in Colombia, as the government has maintained strong managerial tasks in certain irrigation districts.

Colombia has approximately 900,000 hectares of irrigated agriculture, mostly located in the warm center, Magdalena, Cauca and Tolima Valleys, and the northeast near Venezuela’s border and along the Caribbean coast. Approximately, 90% of the agricultural land is irrigated through gravity irrigation systems. According to the Food and Agriculture Organization (FAO), 62% of the functional irrigable land in Colombia has been developed and managed by the private sector. Only 38% was developed by the public sector. FAO estimates that the private sector invested on average US$19 million annually during the period 1991–1997. Colombia has a considerable potential to expand land under irrigation due to high rainfall and fertile volcanic soil creating conditions favorable for a wide range of crops.

Efficiency of irrigation systems is in general very low in the country contributing to soil salinization and water erosion. In addition, agricultural runoff including chemicals from fertilizers and pesticides are taking an increasing toll on Colombian ecosystems. According to the first national communication to the United Nations Framework Convention on Climate Change, Colombia is highly vulnerable to the impacts of climate change, especially highland Andean ecosystems. Colombian Government is in the process of implementing an Integrated National Adaptation Project focused on defining and implementing policy options to meet the anticipated impacts of climate change.

== History of the irrigation sector ==
=== Agricultural land under irrigation; past and present trends ===
The total irrigated area in Colombia was around 50000 ha until 1950. From 1960 through 1990, private irrigated area expanded at an average annual rate of 15000 ha. In 1990, a total of 3.8 million ha were cultivated in Colombia, 750,000 ha, or approximately 10%, of which was equipped with irrigation or drainage facilities. According to the World Development Indicators, in 2007, 900,000 ha, or 24% of the total agricultural land, was actually irrigated. The private sector financed approximately two thirds of the irrigation schemes. The remaining third corresponds to public investment. Colombia has a considerable potential to expand land under irrigation.

=== Institutional Development ===
At the beginning of the century, irrigation development was largely driven by the Colombian government. Public investment on irrigation infrastructure started in 1936 and continued throughout the 1940s and 1950s, when the Colombian government focused in agriculture development in the valleys of Alto Chicamocha, Firavitoba y Samaca in Northern Colombia, and built the irrigation systems of Ramada, Coello, Saldaña and Roldanillo-Union-Toro (RUT).

Water users associations (WUA), such as Coello and Saldaña in Tolima district, become very active and lobbied the government for infrastructure management transfer. In the 1960s, the government increased public investment in irrigation sector building 14 irrigation districts together with drainage and flood control infrastructure through the Colombian Institute for Agrarian Reform (INCORA). In the 1970s with the creation of the Institute for Hydrology, Meteorology and Land Development (HIMAT) the government aimed at increasing water users’ capacity to eventually take over management of irrigation systems. HIMAT would be in charge of management until water users’ association reach adequate capacity. Coello and Saldaña districts were transferred to water users in 1976 under a constitutional principle referred to as "delegation of administration". The "delegation of administration" did not include transfer of ownership for scheme assets nor full WUA control over budgets, operation and maintenance (O&M) plans and personnel. HIMAT retained a strong supervisory role in administering budgets and O&M vis a vis WUA.

In 1993, the government passed a Land Development Law No. 41 in 1993 and its associated enabling Decree Nos. 1278 and 2135 aimed at updating current agreement with water users associations from “delegation of administration” to “concessional contracts”. Under the new agreement water users associations would have full control over irrigation district finances, O&M procedures and personnel but continued not having ownership over irrigation infrastructure.

In 1994, HIMAT was transferred to a newly created institution, the National Institute for Land Development (INAT) aimed at reinvigorate management transfer. INAT reached agreements with WUA on a case-by-case basis. At the beginning of 1990, only Coello and Saldaña (with a total irrigable area of 39,603 ha) had been transferred. By the end of 1996, 17 of the 23 public irrigation districts in the country had been transferred to WUAs or 115,695 ha of a total of 241,077 ha of irrigated area previously under public management. The original plan was to enable total transfer by 1997. However, after experiencing difficulties transferring Maria Baja and other districts the government discontinued implementation aiming at better addressing some of the challenges the remaining associations had. Some of those challenges include facilities in disrepair, high costs of irrigation, lower productivity, lower profitability, social unrest, poverty and inability to collect adequate irrigation fees from farmers.

== Environmental aspects ==
=== Linkages with water resources ===
According to the Food and Agriculture Organization, Colombia receive an average of 3,000mm rainfall annually, which represents a total volume of 3,425 km^{3}. Up to 61% of the total volume turns into an average flow and total internal renewable water resources of 2,113 km^{3}. According to the Institute of Hidrology, Meteorology and Environmental Studies, ecosystems need up to 40% of the total water resources available in Colombia to continue providing full environmental services. Most of the irrigated areas are located in the warm center, Magdalena and Cauca Valleys, and the northeast near Venezuela's border and along the Caribbean coast. Cauca and Tolima Valleys have 40% of irrigated land. Approximately, 90% of the agricultural land is irrigated through gravity irrigation systems but the Cauca Valley and Sabana in Bogota with improved on farm irrigation systems such as dripping and aspersion.

Colombian Main watersheds

Watershed	Surface Drained (km^{2})	Main Rivers	Annual average precipitation (mm)	Annual average flow (mm)
Caribbean	363,878	Magdalena, Cauca, Atrato, Sumapaz, Sogamoso, Saldana, Bogota	300–2,500	487
Pacific	76,500	Patia, San Juan, Mira, Bando, Dagua, Anchicaya	2,000-9,000	221
Orinoquia	350,000	Meta, Guaviare, Arauca, Tomo, Vichada	1,000-2,500	662
Amazon	343,000	Amazon, Vaupes, Guania, Parana, Caqueta y Putumayo	2,550-3,500	694
Catatumbo	8,370	Sardinata, Zulia, Catumbo	1,000-2,500	14
Total	1,141,748	-	3,000	2,078

Source: FAO (2000)

=== Environmental impacts of irrigation ===
According to Marin Ramirez (1991), as quoted in the National Report on Water Resources Management in Colombia, the predominance of gravity irrigation systems are due to both the sense of water being an abundant and cheap resource and the high upfront costs for improved irrigation techniques. Hence, efficiency of irrigation systems is in general very low in the country contributing to soil salinization and water erosion. In addition, agricultural runoff including chemicals from fertilizers and pesticides are taking an increasing toll on Colombian ecosystems.

Ecosystems in Colombia affected by pesticides

Affected Ecosystem	Causing crop
Grande de Santa Marta Swamp	Banana, palm, rice
Zapatosa Swamp	Palm
Meta River	Rice, cotton
Ariari River	Rice
Cauca River	Sugar cane
Caqueta River	Rice
Saldana and Coello Rivers	Rice, cotton
San Jorge River	Rice
Cesar River	Cotton
Cundiboyacense Valley	Flowers, potatoes, vegetables
Andean Forest	Poppy
Amazon Forest	Coca

Source: Health Ministry and Environment Ministry (1996)

=== Anticipated climate change impacts on irrigated agriculture ===
According to the first national communication to the United Nations Framework Convention on Climate Change, Colombia is highly vulnerable to the impacts of climate change. Highland Andean ecosystems, especially moorlands, are expected to be seriously affected by increase in temperature which has recorded a net increase of 0.2-0.3 degrees Celsius per decade during the period 1961–1990 – according to the Meteorological, Hydrological and Environmental Studies Institute—and is expected to continue to do so by the Meteorological Research Institute of Japan. Hydrological temperature changes would result in a loss of biodiversity and the services attached to those such as water supply, basin regulation and hydropower.

== Legal and institutional framework ==
=== Legal framework ===
The Colombian Constitution of 1991 grants to the Colombian Government the responsibility of guaranteeing natural resources sustainable use, including water resources. In 1993, the government passed a Land Development Law No. 41 in 1993 and its associated enabling Decree Nos. 1278 and 2135 aimed at reducing public intervention in the irrigation sector and spurring private investment. The Law incorporates users’ participation in design, building, and posterior operation and maintenance (O&M) by establishing a water fee which includes a fraction of the total costs. The law also establishes the National Council for Land Development (CONSUAT).

The Law 99 of 1993 established the current institutional framework in Colombia; in particular it created the Environment Ministry the National Environmental System (See Water resources management in Colombia for further information). The Law creates a new and complex institutional framework where different administrations and institutions coexist.

=== Institutional framework ===
The Environment Ministry is in charge of formulating water resources management policies and regulations including pollution standards and charge fees. The Agriculture Ministry is in charge of developing sustainable land management, agriculture, forestry and fisheries. The National Council for Land Management (CONSUAT) is the Agriculture Ministry's principal advisor and INAT – together with other public and private entities – is its executive branch. The National Fund for Land Management is an administrative unit in charge of designing and implementing irrigation, drainage and flood control infrastructure. Until 1992, irrigation districts management were subscribed to HIMAT – now renamed INAT – and are currently in the process of being transferred to water user organizations (See History of the irrigation sector above).

Finally, the institutional framework includes a research institution, IDEAM which coordinates the Colombian Environmental Information System and is responsible for meteorology, hydrology, and related environmental studies.

=== Key Legal Issues that Arise in Irrigation PPPs ===
There are a number of legal and commercial issues that will affect how these projects move forward and are structured. Whilst some of the legal issues are not confined to irrigation PPPs they can take on a new dimension and complexity when applied to irrigation: Land ownership; water extraction; public sector counterpart. These will be key issues in a PPP as the private provider will want to ensure a steady revenue stream.

There are also the usual legal considerations that need to be checked when developing PPPs in any sector, such as legal restrictions on the type of PPP arrangement that can be entered into, relevant procurement rules for entering into PPPs, existence of restrictions on foreign investment, taxation and potential for tax holidays and the ability to assign rights such as security and step in rights to lenders.

=== Example of WUA: The Coello Irrigation District ===
The Coello irrigation district is located about 150 kilometers from the capital, Bogota on the left bank of the Magdalena River in the Department of Tolima. The only source of water for the project is the Rio Coello, a tributary of the Magdalena River. About 99Z of the lands of the Coello project belong to private owners. About 56% of the farms in the district are smaller than 10 ha, occupying a total of only 142 of the land area. Another 262 of the farms occupy more than 20 ha each or a total of 712 of the land.

The management of the Coello district was transferred to the Water Users' Association (known as USOCOELLO) when HIHAT was created in 1976. The general conditions of transfer were defined in an agreement between HIMAT and USOCOELLO. USOCOELLO's regulations defining the rights and obligations of the association members, and the functions of the General Assembly, Board, and General Manager are set out in a document issued on October 31, 1986. Any owner, farmer or tenant farmer in the area can be a member of USOCOELLO and submit a request for registration. The district is one of the oldest in Colombia and members of the Association participate actively in the annual meetings.

== Economic aspects ==
=== Water tariff ===
Under Colombian law all beneficiaries of public works must pay a land appreciation surcharge proportionate to the value of the government's investment. Beneficiaries of land improvement districts are also liable for the cost of operations and maintenance (O&M). Operations and maintenance costs are recovered through (i) a fixed water charge (per hectare, per year) and (ii) a variable water charge based on the volume of water delivered for irrigation. The law does not state what proportion of these two charges is to meet O&M costs. Water rates are fixed once a year by HIHAT's Board of Directors before the first planting season starts, at the time of budget preparation. In setting the fixed and volumetric water rates, HIMAT determines the users’ contribution to O&M costs, the government pays the difference. Fixed charges are paid in advance, regardless of land use. Their payment is a pre-requisite for receiving the irrigation service. The volumetric water charges are paid at the end of each season. The collection rate is generally high. Volumetric payments depend on how much water is actually delivered to the farmers. Rainfall varies markedly, which affects demand for supplementary irrigation water. Total water charges covered only 34.9% O&M costs in 1980 and 28.5% in 1987. Only a few districts, including RUT, approach self-sufficiency for operations and maintenance.

=== Investment ===
According to FAO, 463,000 ha of the functional irrigable land in Colombia (or 62%) has been developed and managed by the private sector. Only 38% was developed by the public sector. FAO estimates that the private sector invested an average of US$19 million annually during the period 1991–1997. In 1994, investment cost of private irrigation development for basic irrigation projects providing water for rice and cereal varied between US$750 to 1,000 per hectare. Private investment cost for irrigation schemes featuring pumping lifts varied between US$1,200 to 1,750 per hectare. Finally, private investment costs for irrigations schemes including wells, sprinkles or localized irrigation varied between US$2,000 to 2,700 per hectare.

=== External cooperation ===
During the 1980s, The World Bank invested a total of US$234 million in several small-scale irrigation developments on the foothills of the Andes, in the savannah country of Northern Colombia and the Magdalena watershed in Northwest Colombia.

Particularly in the area of Climate Change, the World Bank is working closely with Colombian Government in an Integrated National Adaptation Project to strengthen Colombian institutions, particularly IDEAM, to produce climate information in support of adaptation to climate change. The project also includes the definition and implementation of a specific pilot adaptation program supporting the maintenance of environmental services in the Las Hermosas Massif including the Amoya watershed protection.

The Inter- American Development Bank worked together with the Colombian government in the 1990s in the creation of a National Irrigation Program and an Irrigation and Drainage Program to support the government's strategy for land improvement and to seek private-sector involvement in efforts to modernize Colombia's agriculture sector.

== Lessons learned from Colombia’s irrigation model ==
Researchers Carlos Garces-Restrepo and Doublas L. Vermillion studied the impact of management transfer to water users’ organizations in selected irrigation systems, namely RUT, Rio Recio, Samaca, San Rafael y Maria La Baja. The findings of the study “support the hypothesis that management transfer leads to efforts by water users associations to improve management efficiency, such as reducing the number of management staff and taking measures to cut costs.” Management transfer also leads to a significant reduction of government expenditures in irrigation management. However, “transfer has not had substantial impacts on the performance of operations and maintenance or in the agricultural and economic productivity of irrigated land or water, neither improving negative performance nor causing detriment where performance was positive.”

The researchers also notice that the concept of “management transfer” varies among countries. In the case of Colombia, government maintained considerable authority over O&M, budgets and human resources. Ownership of infrastructure was never transferred to water users associations nor have water rights been granted. Hence, “it is necessary to test the hypothesis that a more integrated and comprehensive devolution policy would lead to more positive impacts on performance.”

== See also ==
- Water resources management in Colombia
- Water supply and sanitation in Colombia
- Electricity sector in Colombia
