= Cecilia López Montaño =

Colombian politician (born 1943)

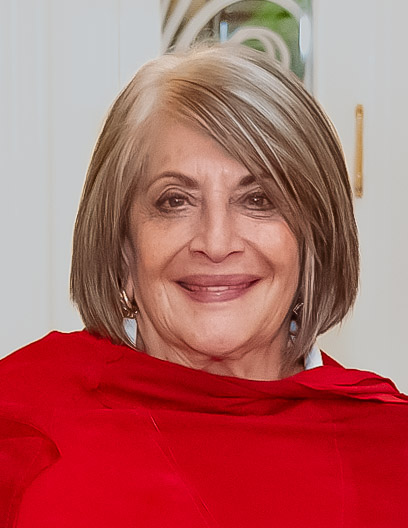

Minister of Agriculture and Rural Development
- In office August 7, 2022 – April 26, 2023
- President: Gustavo Petro
- Preceded by: Rodolfo Enrique Zea
- Succeeded by: Jhenifer Mojica
- In office August 8, 1995 – April 1, 1997
- President: Ernesto Samper Pizano
- Preceded by: Gustavo Castro Guerrero
- Succeeded by: Antonio Gómez Merlano

Senator of Colombia
- In office July 20, 2006 – July 20, 2010

Director of FONADE
- In office April 1, 1997 – August 7, 1998

Minister of Environment
- In office August 1, 1994 – August 1, 1995
- President: Ernesto Samper Pizano
- Preceded by: Manuel Rodríguez Becerra
- Succeeded by: José Vicente Mogollón

Personal details
- Born: Cecilia Matilde López Montaño; April 18, 1943 (age 83) Barranquilla, Atlántico, Colombia
- Party: Liberal Party
- Education: University of the Andes
- Profession: Economist, politician
- Website: www.cecilialopez.com www.cecilialopezcree.com

Cecilia Matilde López Montaño (born April 18, 1943) is a Colombian economist and politician of the Liberal Party who has held several cabinet positions. On September 27, 2009, she was a runner-up in the presidential primary election in Colombia.

== Biography ==
Cecilia began her education at the Parrish and La Enseñanza schools in Barranquilla. She had her degree in economics from the University of the Andes, Colombia. She later received two postgraduate degrees in Demography and the Economy of Education from the Centro de Estudios Educativos, Mexico.

After her graduation, Cecilia started work as the Head of the Department of a unit at the National Planning Department from 1978 to 1980. She has worked as the managing director of Fonade (1981–1982), Vice Minister of Agriculture (1982–1985); Ambassador of Colombia in The Netherlands (1985–1988); Director of the Social Security Department (1990–1992), President of Consenso (1992–1994); Minister of Environment (1994–1996); Minister of Agriculture (1996–1997); Director of the National Planning Department (1997–1998); International Consultant (1998–2006); President of Agenda Colombia Foundation (2002–2006), and Senator of the Republic of Colombia (2006–2010). She has served on the boards of Fedesarrollo and the Natura Foundation. On July 5, 2022, President-Elect Gustavo Petro said he would name her Minister of Agriculture.

== Senate of Colombia (2006 - 2010) ==
Her most notable work is the presentation of the Bill for social transformation. This law promotes to redefine the national development model forcing the State to provide access to all Colombian citizens to a minimum amount of services.

== Acknowledgements ==
On July 20, 2008, the Senator was appointed the Colombian Liberal Party's spokeswoman. By the end of that year, she was nominated by her colleagues, and won Senator of the year award. A nationally recognized award presented by Canal RCN. At the same time, she was chosen by Revista Cambio, as the best member of the Colombian Congress.

She was the President of FIPA’s Group of Women Parliamentarians of the Americas. She was succeeded in 2009 by Linda Machuca of Ecuador.

Lopez received the Cruz de Boyacá Medal, given by the Colombian Government to the citizens that have served the nation with honor. She also received the highest congressional decoration for her contribution to the country's development, and the Queen Beatrice of The Netherlands decoration for her role as Colombian Ambassador in that country.

Senator Lopez was the only female of seven Liberal Party candidates running for the party's nomination for the President of Colombia in 2009.

== Writing ==
López has published and edited 14 books as well as academic and newspaper articles.

Political offices
| Preceded by Manuel Rodríguez Becerra | Minister of Environment; 1994-1995 | Succeeded by José Vicente Mogollón |
| Preceded by Gustavo Castro Guerrero | Minister of Agriculture and Rural Development; 1995-1997; 2022-2023 | Succeeded by Antonio Gómez Merlano |
| Preceded by José Manuel Restrepo | Minister of Agriculture and Rural Development; 1995-1997; 2022-2023 | Succeeded by Jhenifer Mojica |
Order of precedence
| Preceded by Diego Molano as Former Minister of National Defense | Order of precedence of Colombia as Former Cabinet Member | Succeeded by Carolina Corcho as Former Minister of Health and Social Protection |
