= Andia (surname) =

Andia or Andía is a Hispanic surname that may refer to the following notable people:

- Béatrice de Andia (1933–2024), Spanish-French writer and curator
- Belissa Andía Pérez (born 19530, Peruvian activist and essayist
- Erika Andia (born 1972), Bolivian theatre actress, director, and journalist
- José Andía (1898–?), Spanish athlete
- Marcos Andia (born 1988), Bolivian football midfielder
- Mary Luz Andía (born 2000), Peruvian racewalking athlete
- Rafael Andia (born 1942), French classical guitarist
- Yonathan Andía (born 1992), Chilean football player
