= Germán García Durán =

Colombian diplomat

Colombia Ambassador to Kenya
- In office 1995–2005
- President: Ernesto Samper Pizano (1995–1998); Andrés Pastrana Arango (1998–2002); Álvaro Uribe Vélez (2002–2005)
- Preceded by: Jesús Pérez González Rubio
- Succeeded by: María Victoria Díaz
- In office 1990–1993
- President: César Gaviria Trujillo
- Succeeded by: Jesús Pérez González Rubio

General Manager of the National Institute of Renewable Natural Resources and Environment
- In office 1986–1990
- President: Virgilio Barco Vargas
- Succeeded by: Felipe Pineda Aristizábal

Personal details
- Born: North Santander, Colombia
- Education: University of the Andes (BE); University of Notre Dame (MSc)
- Profession: Environmental Engineer

Germán García Durán is a Colombian civil and environmental engineer, graduated from the University of Los Andes in Bogota, Colombia, and the University of Notre Dame in South Bend, Indiana, USA.

== Biography ==
After being a consultant in Colombia and the United States and a university professor in Colombia, he twice served as Ambassador of Colombia to Kenya. During his diplomatic mission, García, who is an environmental engineer and had been General Manager of the National Institute of Renewable Natural Resources and Environment prior to his appointment, pursued global environmental policies as Permanent Representative to the United Nations Office at Nairobi which includes the United Nations Environment Programme, and UN-HABITAT. He was Chairman of the Group of 77 on several occasions, Vice President of the Vienna Convention for the Protection of the Ozone Layer, and is currently Executive President of Río Urbano, a Waterkeeper Alliance member NGO that looks to protect riverbeds in urban areas.
