= Andia (given name) =

Andia is a female given name that may refer to the following notable people:

- Andia Chaves Fonnegra, Colombian marine biologist
- Andia Ulliri, Albanian politician
