= Andia Chaves Fonnegra =

Colombian marine biologist

- Education: Universidad Jorge Tadeo Lozano; Universidad Nacional de Colombia; Nova Southeastern University
- Scientific career
- Fields: marine biology marine ecology
- Workplaces: National University of Colombia; INVEMAR; Smithsonian Tropical Research Institute; Universidad Pedagógica Nacional (Colombia); University of Alberta; Nova Southeastern University; University of the Virgin Islands; University of Mississippi; Florida Atlantic University
- Thesis: Increases of excavating sponges on Caribbean coral reefs : reproduction, dispersal and coral deterioration (2014)
- Doctoral advisor: Jose V. Lopez
- Other academic advisors: Bernard Riegl, Sven Zea, Mateo Lopez Victoria

Andia Chaves Fonnegra is a Colombian marine biologist known for her research on the marine sponge Cliona delitrix.

== Education and career ==
Fonnegra earned her bachelor's degree (2003) in marine biology from the Jorge Tadeo Lozano University and her master's degree (2006) in marine biology from the National University of Colombia. In 2007 she taught at Colombia's Universidad Pedagogic Nacional before moving to the University of Alberta where she was a graduate student from 2007 to 2008. In 2009, she transferred to Nova Southeastern University, in Florida, where she graduated in 2014 with a PhD in oceanography and marine biology. Fonnegra's dissertation was "Increase of Excavating Sponges on Caribbean Coral Reefs: Reproduction, Dispersal, and Coral Deterioration".

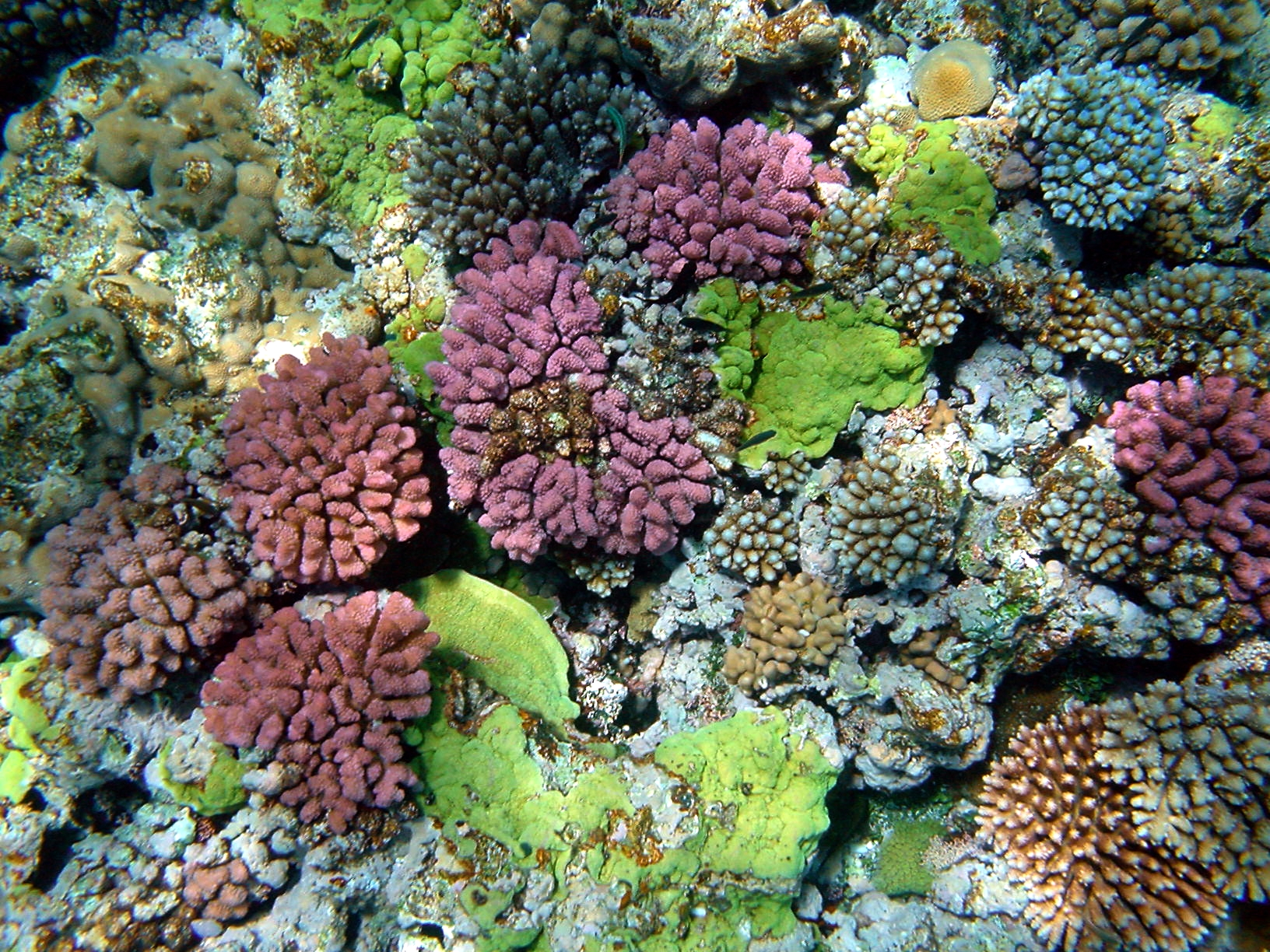
The excavating action of the sponge Cliona delitrix on the coral reefs is Andia Chaves' main line of research.

Fonnegra was a postdoctoral researcher at the Coral Reef Restoration, Assessment & Monitoring (CRRAM) Laboratory - Nova Southeastern University in 2014-2015, later at the Center for Marine and Environmental Studies (CMES) - University of the Virgin Islands in 2016-2017, and also at the Department of Biomolecular Sciences - University of Mississippi in 2018. In 2018, she became an assistant professor at Florida Atlantic University, where she has a joint appointment between the Harbor Branch Oceanographic Institute and the Harriet Wilkes Honors College. She is known for her research on the marine sponge Cliona delitrix, an organism that grows between the calcium carbonate that forms the skeleton of coral reefs and that, through an excavating action, gradually deteriorates the coral. In the Caribbean Sea the development of this sponge has accelerated in recent years, resulting in the gradual erosion of corals, altering the ecosystem.

== Awards and honors ==
- 2002 – SIGMA XI Grant Award, Scientific Research Society
- 2006 – Meritorious Mention Master's Thesis, Universidad Nacional de Colombia
- 2008 – Donald Ross Academic Merit, University of Alberta
- 2010 – NSU Chancellor´s Faculty Research and Development Grant, Nova Southeastern University
- 2011 – L'Oréal-UNESCO Scholarship for Women in Science
- 2014 – Student Life Achievement Award, Nova Southeastern University
- 2019 – Gulf Research Program’s Early-Career Research Fellowships of The National Academies of Sciences, Engineering and Medicine.
- 2023 - NSF Early Career Award, Florida Atlantic University

== Selected publications ==
- Chaves-Fonnegra, Andia; Castellanos, Leonardo; Zea, Sven; Duque, Carmenza; Rodríguez, Jaime; Jiménez, Carlos (2008). "Clionapyrrolidine A—A Metabolite from the Encrusting and Excavating Sponge Cliona tenuis that Kills Coral Tissue upon Contact". Journal of Chemical Ecology. 34 (12): 1565–1574. doi:10.1007/s10886-008-9565-5. PMID 19023625. S2CID 21404694.
- Chaves-Fonnegra, Andia; Zea, Sven (2011). "Coral colonization by the encrusting excavating Caribbean sponge Cliona delitrix". Marine Ecology. 32 (2): 162–173. Bibcode:2011MarEc..32..162C. doi:10.1111/j.1439-0485.2010.00416.x.
- Chaves-Fonnegra, Andia; Maldonado, Manuel; Blackwelder, Patricia; Lopez, Jose V. (2015). "Asynchronous reproduction and multi-spawning in the coral-excavating sponge Cliona delitrix". Journal of the Marine Biological Association of the United Kingdom. 96 (2): 515–528. doi:10.1017/S0025315415000636. hdl:10261/121387. ISSN 0025-3154. S2CID 52486029.
- Chaves-Fonnegra, A. (2014). Increase of excavating sponges on Caribbean coral reefs: Reproduction, dispersal, and coral deterioration. Dissertation. Nova Southeastern University.
- Chaves-Fonnegra, Andia; Feldheim, Kevin A.; Secord, Jesse; Lopez, Jose V. (2015). "Population structure and dispersal of the coral-excavating sponge Cliona delitrix". Molecular Ecology. 24 (7): 1447–1466. doi:10.1111/mec.13134. PMID 25732628. S2CID 4492547.
- Brandt, Marilyn E.; Olinger, Lauren K.; Chaves-Fonnegra, Andia; Olson, Julie B.; Gochfeld, Deborah J. (2019). "Coral recruitment is impacted by the presence of a sponge community". Marine Biology. 166 (4) 49. doi:10.1007/s00227-019-3493-5. S2CID 91626018.
