= Linda Machuca (politician) =

Ecuadorian politician

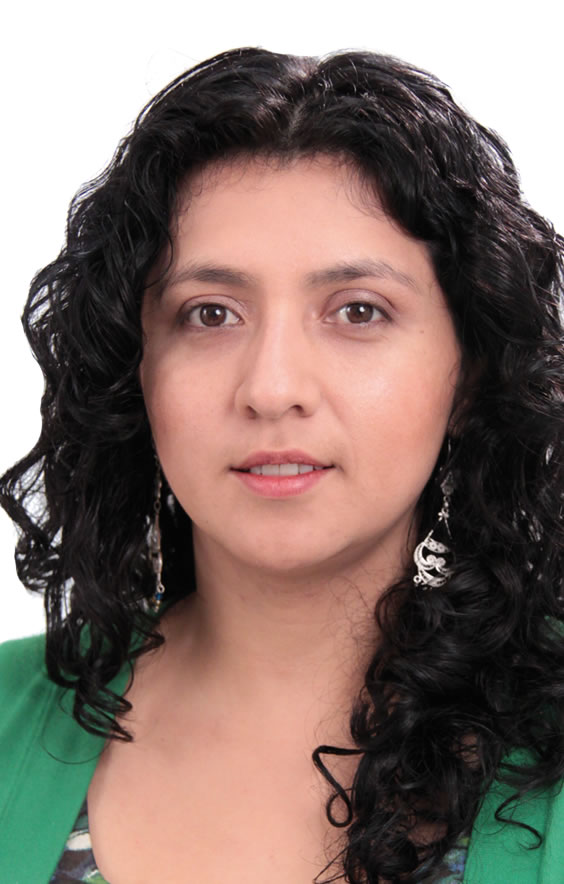
- Education: University of Cuenca (et al)
- Occupation: politician
- Known for: represented migrants in the National Assembly
- Political party: Alianza PAIS Party

Linda Machuca Moscoso is an Ecuadorian politician who represented migrants in the National Assembly until 2015. She became Ecuador's consul in New York in 2016.

== Life ==
Machuca was born in Cuenca and she graduated from that city's University. She was living in the United States when she was elected as Member of the Constituent Assembly in 2006, representing Ecuadorian immigrant. She participated in the Constituent Assembly responsible for drafting Ecuador's new Constitution, which was approved by national referendum in 2008. Following the approval of Ecuador’s new Constitution, the country held general elections in 2009. Linda Machuca was elected to the National Assembly, representing Ecuadorian immigrants in the United States and Canada. In 2013, she was re-elected to the National Assembly. In 2016, she resigned from her legislative position after being appointed Consul General of Ecuador in New York.

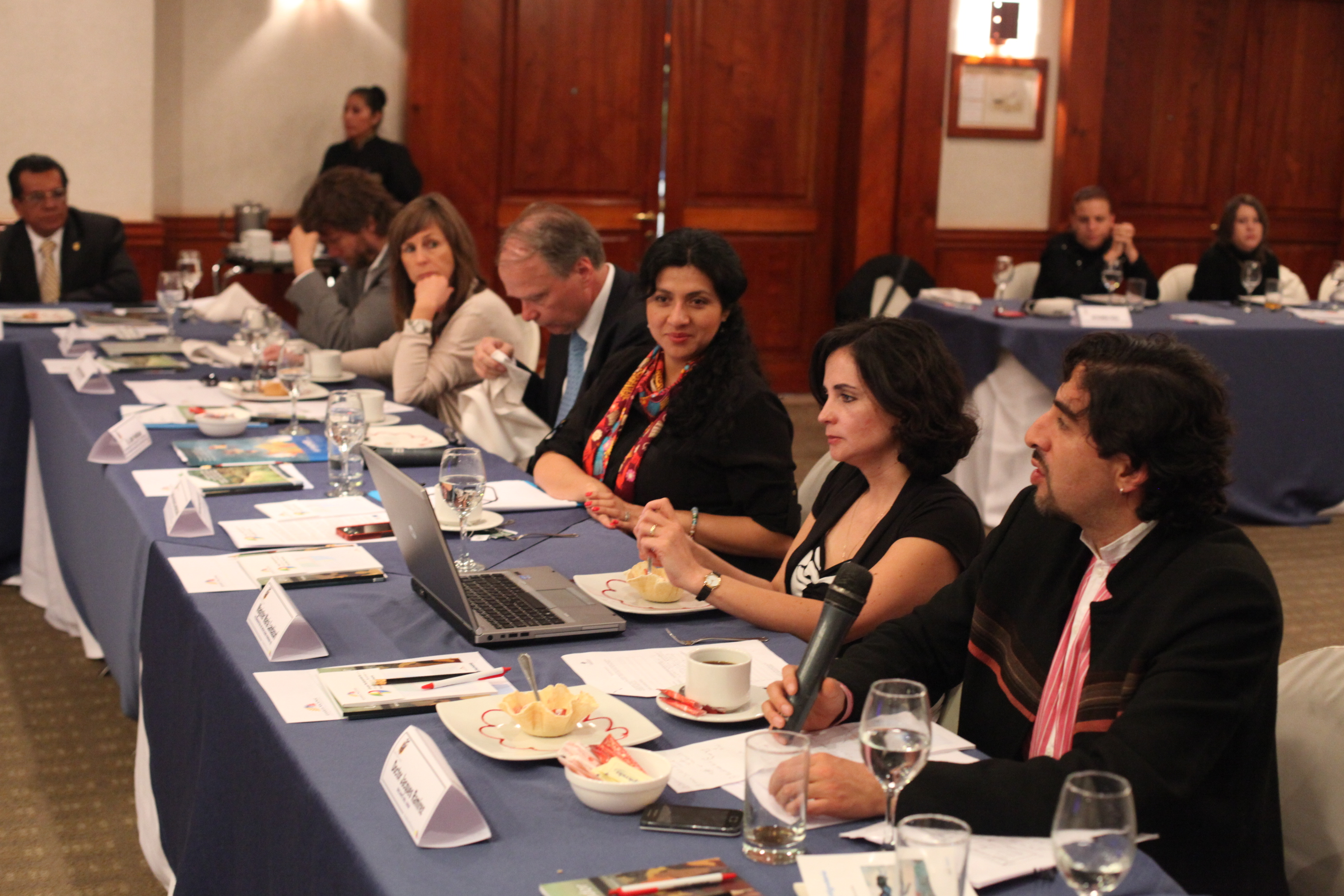
Machuca and the Parliamentary Group for the Rights of People in Human Mobility in 2013

She was elected to be the President of FIPA's Group of Women Parliamentarians of the Americas in 2009. She succeeded Cecilia López who was a senator in Colombia. In 2010 Machuca was at the National Assembly as the building was the location of an international meeting of that group. Machuca welcomed the delegates from sixteen counties and highlighted that, 6 out of 10 women suffer domestic violence, in her opening address.

In 2012, she was in the US, explaining a new fund that was open to Ecuadorians who were living abroad and wanted to study at a university. The $180m fund was available to people born in Ecuador or who had Ecauadrian parents as they were considered to be Ecuadorian nationals. She was a member of the assembly until 2015.

In April 2016 she was appointed as Ecuador's consul general in New York by the Minister of Foreign Affairs, Ricardo Patiño Aroca. She established an office in Manhattan taking over a floor of a building in 800 Second Avenue. She was elected to be the President of the Latin American consuls.
