= Brian Machuca =

Argentine professional footballer

Personal information
- Full name: Brian Ezequiel Machuca
- Date of birth: 2 March 1995 (age 31)
- Place of birth: Córdoba, Argentina
- Height: 1.85 m (6 ft 1 in)
- Position: Centre-back

Team information
- Current team: Güemes

Youth career
- Almirante Brown

Senior career*
Years	Team	Apps	(Gls)
2013–2019	Almirante Brown	100	(4)
2013–2014	→ Liniers (loan)	13	(0)
2019	Alebrijes de Oaxaca	0	(0)
2020–2021	Temperley	19	(0)
2021–2022	Almagro	31	(0)
2023	Güemes	28	(1)
2024	Deportivo Morón	24	(1)
2025–	Güemes	7	(1)

International career
2016	Argentina U23		
- * Club domestic league appearances and goals as of 18:04, 12 August 2025 (UTC)

Brian Ezequiel Machuca (born 2 March 1995) is an Argentine professional footballer who plays as a centre-back for Güemes.

== Club career ==
Machuca's career began in 2013 with Almirante Brown of Primera B Nacional. He was an unused substitute for fixtures with Gimnasia y Esgrima, Banfield and Nueva Chicago before making his professional bow on 3 June 2013 during a 1–3 loss against Olimpo. On 30 June, Machuca joined Primera C Metropolitana's Liniers on loan. After not featuring in 2013–14 as they were relegated, he made thirteen appearances in the 2014 Primera D Metropolitana. Machuca went back to Almirante Brown in 2015, with them now in Primera B Metropolitana. Goals versus Deportivo Español and Villa San Carlos arrived across four seasons.

In September 2019, following one hundred matches for Almirante Brown, Machuca completed a move to Mexican football with Ascenso MX side Alebrijes de Oaxaca. He didn't feature in the league for the club, though did appear in Copa MX games against Veracruz. On 3 February 2020, Machuca returned to his homeland with Primera B Nacional's Temperley. In July 2021, Machuca moved to fellow league club Almagro.

== International career ==
Julio Olarticoechea called up Machuca to play with the Argentina U23s at the 2016 Sait Nagjee Trophy.

== Career statistics ==
As of 4 July 2020.

Appearances and goals by club, season and competition
Club	Season	League			Cup		League Cup		Continental		Other		Total	
Club	Season	Division	Apps	Goals	Apps	Goals	Apps	Goals	Apps	Goals	Apps	Goals	Apps	Goals
Almirante Brown	2012–13	Primera B Nacional	2	0	0	0	—		—		0	0	2	0
Almirante Brown	2013–14	Primera B Nacional	0	0	0	0	—		—		0	0	0	0
Almirante Brown	2014	Primera B Metropolitana	0	0	0	0	—		—		0	0	0	0
Almirante Brown	2015	Primera B Metropolitana	26	1	0	0	—		—		0	0	26	1
Almirante Brown	2016	Primera B Metropolitana	5	1	0	0	—		—		0	0	5	1
Almirante Brown	2016–17	Primera B Metropolitana	13	0	0	0	—		—		0	0	13	0
Almirante Brown	2017–18	Primera B Metropolitana	31	0	0	0	—		—		0	0	31	0
Almirante Brown	2018–19	Primera B Metropolitana	23	2	0	0	—		—		0	0	23	2
Almirante Brown	Total		100	4	0	0	—		—		0	0	100	4
Liniers (loan)	2013–14	Primera C Metropolitana	0	0	0	0	—		—		0	0	0	0
Liniers (loan)	2014	Primera D Metropolitana	13	0	0	0	—		—		0	0	13	0
Liniers (loan)	Total		13	0	0	0	—		—		0	0	13	0
Alebrijes de Oaxaca	2019–20	Ascenso MX	0	0	2	0	—		—		0	0	2	0
Temperley	2019–20	Primera B Nacional	1	0	0	0	—		—		0	0	1	0
Career total			114	4	2	0	—		—		0	0	116	4
