= Elías Machuca =

Argentine professional footballer

Personal information
- Full name: Elías Ezequiel Machuca
- Date of birth: 28 March 2003 (age 23)
- Place of birth: Lanús, Argentina
- Height: 1.77 m (5 ft 10 in)
- Position: Centre-back

Team information
- Current team: Nueva Chicago
- Number: 5

Youth career
- Orientacion Juvenil
- Lanús
- 2017–2020: Racing Club

Senior career*
Years	Team	Apps	(Gls)
2020–2024	Racing Club	1	(0)
2025–	Nueva Chicago	0	(0)

International career
- Argentina U15
- Argentina U16
- * Club domestic league appearances and goals as of 18:09, 19 June 2025 (UTC)

Elías Ezequiel Machuca (born 28 March 2003) is an Argentine professional footballer who plays as a centre-back for Nueva Chicago.

== Club career ==
Machuca was spotted by Lanús whilst appearing for Orientacion Juvenil; amid interest from Racing Club. After being with Lanús between the ages of eight and twelve, the then central midfielder would leave in 2017 to belatedly join Racing Club. After progressing through their youth ranks, Machuca soon started to train with their first-team squad; as he made his unofficial debut in a friendly match against Athletico Paranaense in January 2020. Towards the end of that year, in November and December, he was an unused substitute for Copa de la Liga Profesional matches with Atlético Tucumán, Unión Santa Fe and Arsenal de Sarandí.

Machuca made his senior debut under manager Sebastián Beccacece on 11 December 2020 in a Copa de la Liga Profesional fixture versus Vélez Sarsfield, as he played the full duration of 2–1 loss away from home.

== International career ==
Machuca received call-ups from Argentina at both U15 and U16 level. A first training call with the former came at the end of 2017, while he appeared in a friendly for the latter against their England counterparts in April 2019. He also won a few minor exhibition tournaments, in Portugal and France, with the U16s.

== Career statistics ==
As of 12 December 2020.

Appearances and goals by club, season and competition
Club	Season	League			Cup		League Cup		Continental		Other		Total	
Club	Season	Division	Apps	Goals	Apps	Goals	Apps	Goals	Apps	Goals	Apps	Goals	Apps	Goals
Racing Club	2020–21 (Note: Soccerway counts Copa de la Liga Profesional appearances as league appearances.)	Primera División	1	0	0	0	0	0	0	0	0	0	1	0
Career total			1	0	0	0	0	0	0	0	0	0	1	0
