= Béatrice de Andia =

Spanish-French writer and curator (1933–2024)

- Born: 17 September 1933; Madrid, Spain
- Died: 16 October 2024 (aged 91); Azay-le-Rideau, France
- Education: Paris Nanterre University; Sciences Po
- Occupations: Writer; Curator

Béatrice de Andia (17 September 1933 – 16 October 2024) was a Spanish-French writer and curator.

== Life and career ==
Born in Madrid on 17 September 1933, de Andia grew up in a family of Spanish and French nationality. She was the daughter of Manuel Gonzalez de Andia y Talleyrand-Périgord, Duke of Dino, and Mercedes de Elio. Her French origins stemmed from her paternal grandmother, a member of the House of Talleyrand-Périgord, a descendant of her five-time great uncle Charles Maurice de Talleyrand-Périgord. She was raised in an 18th Century country house in Saint-Brice-sous-Forêt. She graduated from the Sciences Po and earned a doctorate from Paris Nanterre University in 1974.

De Andia spent the majority of her cultural career in Paris, though she travelled around the world in her Citroën 2CV. She then moved to her castle in Azay-le-Rideau in 1986 and opened the Jardins de la Chatonnière to the public in 2000. That year, she joined the Commission du Vieux Paris. In 2006, she founded the Observatoire du patrimoine religieux. She was also a founding member of the La Revue des vieilles maisons françaises.

De Andia died in Azay-le-Rideau, on 16 October 2024, at the age of 91.

== Awards ==
- Knight of the Legion of Honour (1991)
- Officer of the Ordre national du Mérite (1995)
- Prix Berger of the Académie des Inscriptions et Belles-Lettres (1998)
- Officer of the Legion of Honour (2001)
- Knight of the Ordre des Palmes académiques (2002)
- Commander of the Ordre national du Mérite (2008)
- Dame of the Order of Merit (2010)
