= National Institute of Renewable Natural Resources and Environment (Colombia) =

- Instituto Nacional de los Recursos Naturales Renovables y del Ambiente

Agency overview
- Formed: 22 September 1968
- Dissolved: 22 December 1993
- Superseding agency: Ministry of Environment
- Headquarters: Bogotá, D.C.
- Parent agency: Ministry of Agriculture

The National Institute of Renewable Natural Resources and Environment, also known as INDERENA, was a Colombian environmental government agency established in 1968 to implement environmental policy and promote green development in Colombia. INDERENA was successful in helping create the environment in government and the acceptance in society to move environmental protection into the national agenda, this led to the creation of child agencies like the National Natural Parks System, and the eventual evolution into the Ministry of Environment in 1993.

== See also ==
- Germán García Durán
