= José Benito Vives de Andréis Marine and Coastal Research Institute =

Colombian government organization

Instituto de Investigaciones Marinas y Costeras, José Benito Vives de Andréis
- José Benito Vives de Andréis; Marine and Coastal Research Institute

Agency overview
- Formed: 22 December 1993
- Preceding agency: Punta Betín Marine Research Institute
- Headquarters: Calle 25 № 2-55, Playa Salguero; Santa Marta, Magdalena, Colombia
- Motto: "Colombia 50% sea"
- Agency executive: Francisco Armando Arias Isaza, Director
- Parent agency: Ministry of Environment and Sustainable Development
- Website: www.invemar.org.co

The Marine and Coastal Research Institute "José Benito Vives de Andréis" (INVEMAR) is a nonprofit marine and coastal research institute of Colombia, linked to the Ministry of Environment and Sustainable Development. They edit the journal Boletín de Investigaciones Marinas y Costeras (the Bulletin of Marine and Coastal Research). It is located in Playa Salguero, in Santa Marta, and is named after José Benito Vives de Andréis, a well-known local politician involved different aspects of the city's development. Their institutional motto "Colombia 50% sea" refers to the extensive jurisdictional maritime area the country has.

INVEMAR is currently led by director general Francisco Armando Arias Isaza, a navy officer and marine biologist with a PhD in Coastal Zone Management.

== Purpose and function ==
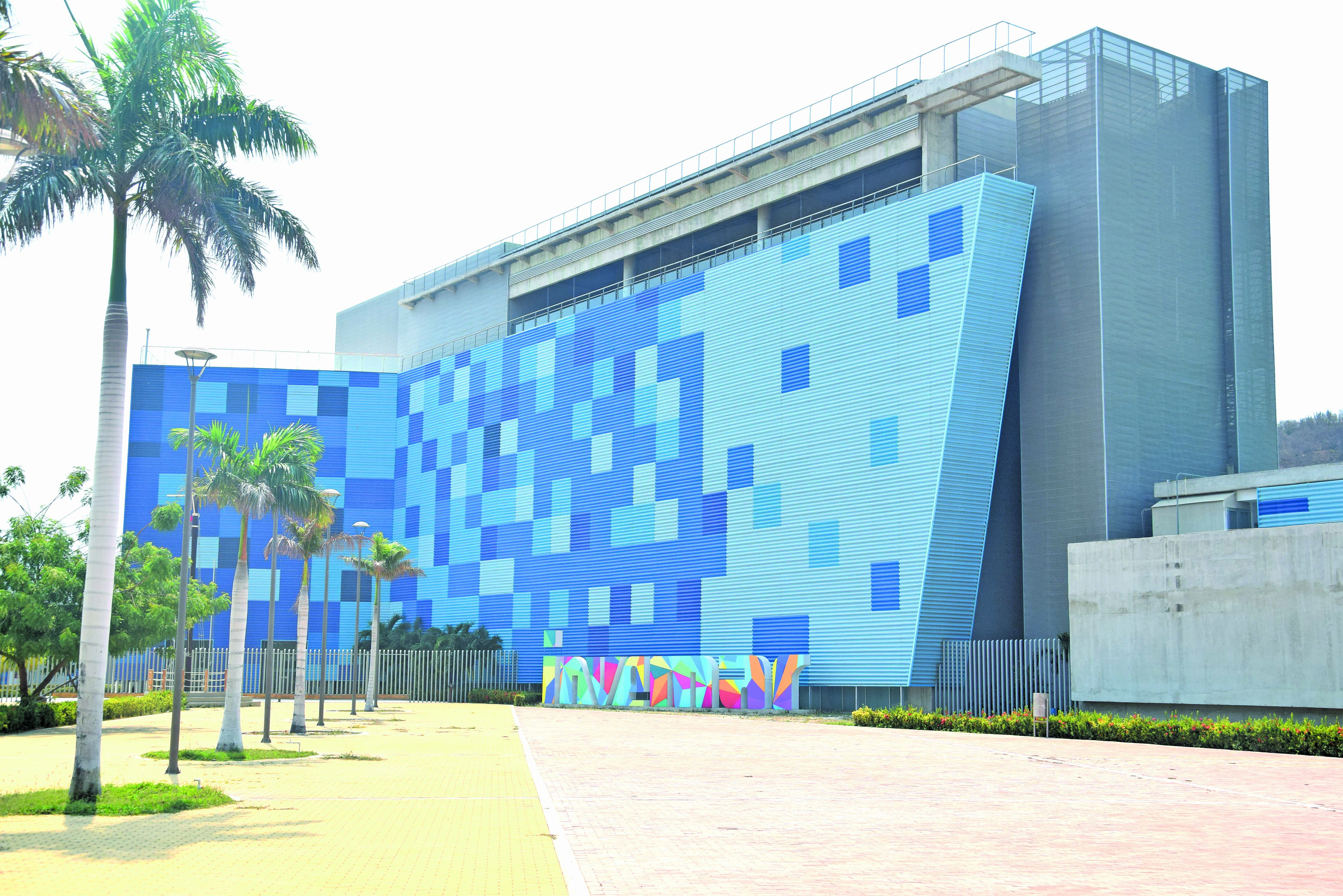
Site of the INVEMAR, in Santa Marta

The mission of INVEMAR is to carry out basic and applied research on the environment and renewable resources in marine and oceanic ecosystems of Colombia, to provide the scientific knowledge for the sustainable management of the resources, the recovery of the marine and protection of coastal ecosystems.

Among its objectives are to advise other governmental agencies on the use of natural resources and conservation of coastal and marine ecosystem, to liaise with the Ministry of Environment, and strengthen scientific and research capabilities in Colombia.

== Research programs ==
=== Biodiversity and Marine Ecosystems ===
This program is in charge of the inventory of the marine and coastal biodiversity of Colombia. It also manages the Museum of Marine Natural History of Colombia Makuriwa.

=== Marine Environmental Quality ===
This program focuses on the impact of natural and anthropogenic activities on marine and coastal ecosystems.

=== Marine and Coastal Geoscience ===
This program studies geographical and physicochemical aspects of coastal and oceanic systems, and how they are influenced by Colombia's productive processes.

=== Valuation and Use of Marine and Coastal Resources ===
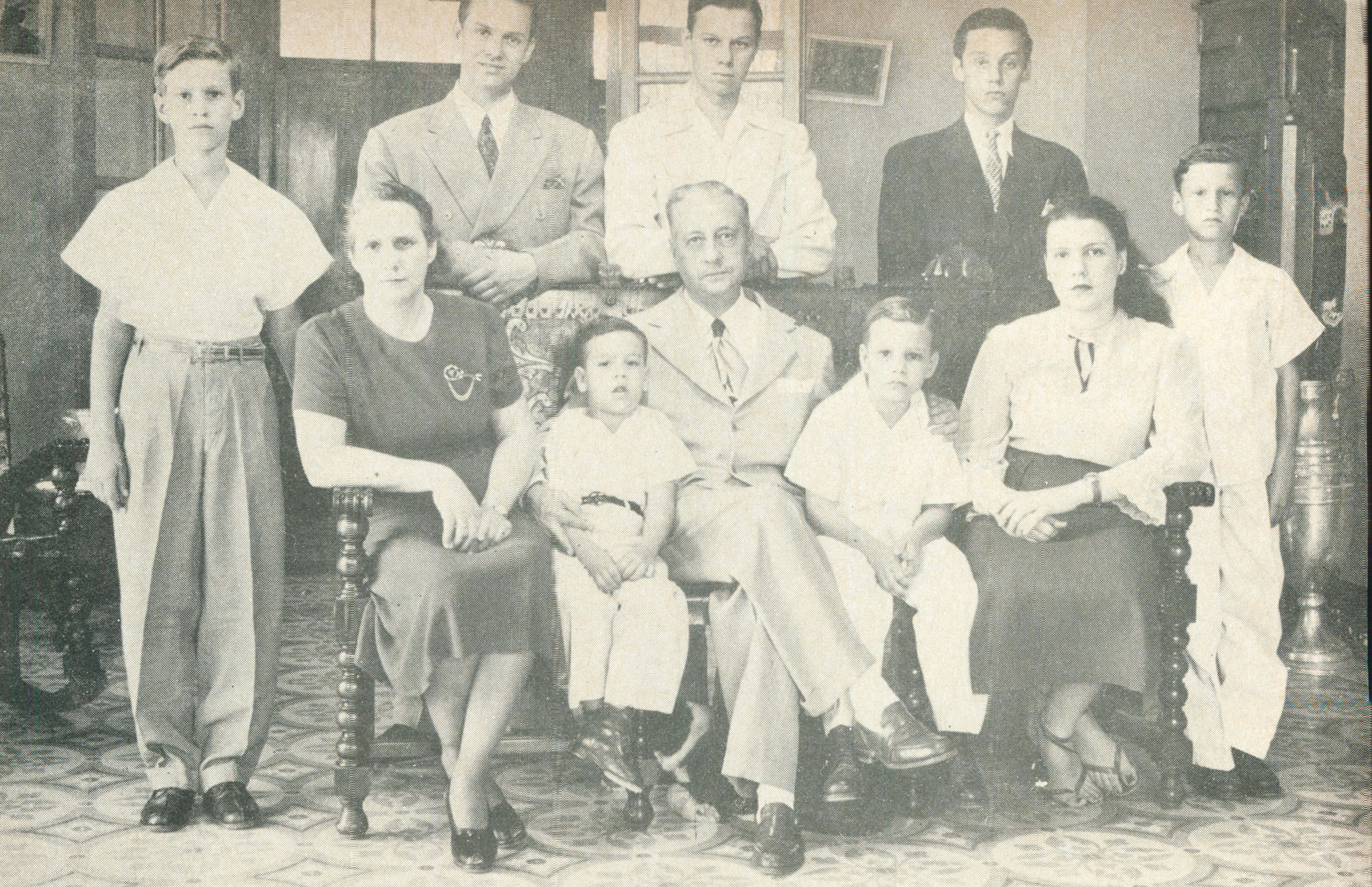
José Benito Vives de Andréis and his family

This program deals mainly with the sustainable use and production in coastal environments, and the application of related products in health and industry.

== Public engagement and outreach ==
INVEMAR manages Makuriwa, the Museum of Marine Natural History of Colombia; its name comes from the Ikun language of the Arhuaco indigenous populations. Their purpose is to share their research and knowledge about the Colombian coastal and oceanic ecosystems, to promote the rational use of resources by scientists, policy makers and the general public.

They also engage the public using social media, through their Twitter and Instagram accounts.
