= Ministry of Environment (Colombia) =

- Ministerio de Ambiente

Agency overview
- Formed: 22 December 1993
- Preceding agency: National Institute of Renewable Natural Resources and Environment (INDERENA)
- Dissolved: 27 December 2002
- Superseding agency: Ministry of Environment, Housing and Territorial Development
- Type: Environment
- Jurisdiction: Central government of Colombia
- Headquarters: Bogotá, D.C.
- Key document: Ley 99 de 1993

The Ministry of Environment was the national executive ministry of the Government of Colombia charged with determining and regulating the standards and guidelines for the protection of the environment, investigate and implement environmental policies. As part of a wider cabinet reshuffle in 2002, the ministry was given the housing and land management portfolios, becoming the Ministry of Environment, Housing and Territorial Development.

As of 2010, President Juan Manuel Santos talked about the need to separate the Ministry again to once again bring environmental protection and sustainability in par with the needs of the nation and its importance to government.

== Ministers ==
Order	Period	Ministers of Environment
1st	1994-1994	Manuel Rodríguez Becerra
2nd	1994–1995	Cecilia López Montaño
3rd	1995–1997	José Vicente Mogollón
4th	1997–1998	Eduardo Verano de la Rosa
5th	1998–2002	Juan Mayr Maldonado
6th	2002–2003	Cecilia Rodríguez González-Rubio

== See also ==
- Sandra Bessudo Lion
