= List of political parties in Colombia =

This article lists notable political parties in Colombia. Colombia historically maintained a two-party system dominated by the Colombian Liberal Party and Colombian Conservative Party, resulting in considerable difficulty for anybody to achieve major electoral success under the banner of any other party. In the current day, it is a multi-party system, with every party that gets more than 3% of the valid votes in each of the two chambers of Congress getting legal recognition. Some special cases such as parties of minority groups are also able to attain legal status even if they fail to reach this requirement.

== Parties with legal recognition ==
In the parliamentary election of 2022, the following parties got the minimum required number of votes for legal recognition (3% of valid votes).

=== Represented in Congress ===
Party	Abbr.	Est.	Ideology	Political position	Status in government	Senators	Seats in the House	Governors	Deputies	Mayors	Leader	Affiliation	Alliance
Historic Pact; Pacto Histórico	PH	2025	Progressivism	Left-wing	Coalition	25 / 108 (23%)	41 / 188 (22%)	1 / 32 (3%)	14 / 418 (3%)	17 / 1,102	Gustavo Petro	FSP	—N/a
Democratic Centre; Centro Democrático	CD	2013	Conservatism; Economic liberalism; Right-wing populism	Right-wing to far-right	Opposition	13 / 108 (12%)	15 / 188 (8%)	3 / 32 (9%)	34 / 418 (8%)	154 / 1,102	Álvaro Uribe	IDU	—N/a
Colombian Liberal Party; Partido Liberal Colombiano	PLC	1848	Liberalism; Social liberalism; Social democracy	Centre-left to centre-right	Coalition	14 / 108 (13%)	32 / 188 (17%)	7 / 32 (22%)	78 / 418 (19%)	181 / 1,102	César Gaviria	SI	—N/a
Radical Change; Cambio Radical	CR	1998	Conservative liberalism	Centre to centre-right	Opposition	11 / 108 (10%)	16 / 188 (9%)	7 / 32 (22%)	64 / 418 (15%)	155 / 1,102	Rodrigo Lara	—N/a	CR/ALMA
Union Party for the People; Partido de la Unión por la Gente	U	2005	Liberalism; Social liberalism; Third Way	Centre	Independent	14 / 108 (13%)	25 / 172 (15%)	4 / 32 (13%)	74 / 418 (18%)	258 / 1,102	Dilian Francisca Toro	LI (Note: As observer.)	—N/a
Colombian Conservative Party; Partido Conservador Colombiano	PCC	1849	Conservatism; Christian democracy; Neoliberalism	Centre-right to right-wing	Independent	15 / 108 (14%)	25 / 188 (13%)	7 / 32 (22%)	65 / 418 (16%)	194 / 1,102	Hernán Andrade	CDI, IDU	—N/a
Green Alliance; Alianza Verde	AV	2009	Green politics; Progressivism	Centre-left	Coalition	8 / 108 (7%)	11 / 188 (6%)	3 / 32 (9%)	44 / 418 (11%)	50 / 1,102	Claudia López	GG, FSP	ApC
Commons; Comunes		2017	Marxism–Leninism; Feminism; Progressivism	Far-left to centre-left	Coalition	5 / 108 (5%)	5 / 188 (3%)	0 / 32 (0%)		4 / 1,102	Timoleón Jiménez	FSP	FC
Fair and Free Colombia; Colombia Justa Libres	CJL	2017	Christian fundamentalism; Christian right; Evangelicalism	Right-wing	Independent	3 / 108 (3%)	1 / 172 (0.6%)	2 / 32 (6%)	2 / 418 (0.5%)	14 / 1,102	David Castro	—N/a	CR/ALMA
Independent Movement of Absolute Renovation; Movimiento Independiente de Renovación Absoluta	MIRA	2000	Christian democracy; Social conservatism; Communitarianism	Right-wing	Independent	3 / 108 (3%)	1 / 172 (0.6%)	0 / 32 (0%)	8 / 418 (2%)	0 / 1,102	Carlos Guevara	AMI	AC
Dignity and Commitment; Dignidad y Compromiso	D&C	2020	Direct democracy; Protectionism; Social liberalism; Third Way	Centre	Independent	0 / 108 (0%)	1 / 188 (0.5%)	0 / 32 (0%)	2 / 418 (0.5%)	0 / 1,102	Juan Ospina	PA	AC
New Liberalism; Nuevo Liberalismo	NL	1979	Cultural liberalism; Social liberalism	Centre	Independent	0 / 108 (0%)	1 / 188 (0.5%)	0 / 32 (0%)	0 / 418 (0%)	0 / 1,102	Juan Manuel Galán	—N/a	AC
League of Anti-Corruption Governors; Liga de Gobernantes Anticorrupción	LIGA	2022	Anti-corruption; Liberalism; Protectionism	Far-right	Opposition	1 / 108 (0.9%)	3 / 188 (2%)	0 / 32 (0%)	0 / 418 (0%)	0 / 1,102	Rodolfo Hernández	—N/a	CR/ALMA
On Going! En Marcha	EM	2022	Centrism; Federalism; Social liberalism	Centre-left to centre	Independent	3 / 108 (3%)	0 / 188 (0%)	0 / 32 (0%)	0 / 418 (0%)	0 / 1,102	Juan Fernando Cristo	—N/a	ApC
Citizen Force; Fuerza Ciudadana	FC	2022	Labourism; Progressivism; Social democracy	Centre-left	Coalition	0 / 108 (0%)	1 / 188 (0.5%)	0 / 32 (0%)	0 / 418 (0%)	0 / 1,102	Carlos Caicedo	—N/a	FC
The Force; La Fuerza	FP	2022	Feminism; Progressivism; Social democracy	Left-wing to centre-left	Coalition	1 / 108 (0.9%)	1 / 188 (0.5%)	0 / 32 (0%)	0 / 418 (0%)	0 / 1,102	Roy Barreras	—N/a	FAU
Independent; Independientes		2023	Progressivism; Social democracy	Centre-left	Coalition	1 / 108 (0.9%)	1 / 188 (0.5%)	0 / 32 (0%)	0 / 418 (0%)	1 / 1,102		—N/a	—N/a
Oxygen Party; Partido Oxígeno	PVO	1998	Green conservatism	Centre	Opposition	1 / 108 (0.9%)	1 / 188 (0.5%)	0 / 32 (0%)	0 / 418 (0%)	0 / 1,102	Íngrid Betancourt	—N/a	—N/a
We Are All Colombia; Todos Somos Colombia		2023	Pacifism; Pluralism; Social democracy	Left-wing to centre-left	Coalition	1 / 108 (0.9%)	1 / 188 (0.5%)	0 / 32 (0%)	0 / 418 (0%)	0 / 1,102	Clara López	—N/a	FAU
People on the Move; Gente En Movimiento	GEM	2021	Social liberalism	Centre	Coalition	0 / 108 (0%)	1 / 188 (0.5%)	0 / 32 (0%)	0 / 418 (0%)	0 / 1,102	Mauricio Lizcano	—N/a	—N/a
I Am Because We Are; Soy Porque Somos	SPS	2023	Afro-Colombian interests; Environmentalism; Indigenismo; Progressivism	Left-wing	Coalition	0 / 108 (0%)	1 / 188 (0.5%)	0 / 32 (0%)	0 / 418 (0%)	0 / 1,102	Francia Márquez	—N/a	—N/a

=== Not represented in the Congress of Colombia ===
Party	Abbr.	Est.	Ideology	Political position	Governors	Deputies	Mayors	Leader	Alliance
National Salvation Movement; Movimiento de Salvación Nacional	MSN	2021	Economic liberalism; Right-wing populism; Social conservatism	Far-right	0 / 32 (0%)	0 / 418 (0%)	4 / 1,102	Enrique Gómez Martínez	—N/a
Democratic Hope; Esperanza Democrática		2023	Bolivarianism; Marxism; Progressivism	Left-wing to centre-left	0 / 32 (0%)	0 / 418 (0%)	0 / 1,102		FAU
New Democratic Force; Nueva Fuerza Democrática	NFD	2023	Conservatism; Economic liberalism; Uribism	Right-wing	0 / 32 (0%)	0 / 418 (0%)	0 / 1,102		—N/a
We Believe Colombia; Creemos Colombia		2023	Conservatism; Economic liberalism; Social conservatism	Centre-right	2 / 32 (6%)	6 / 418 (1%)	43 / 1,102	Federico Gutiérrez	—N/a
Worker's Party; Partido del Trabajo de Colombia	PTC	1999	Marxism; Anti-imperialism; New Democracy	Left-wing	0 / 32 (0%)	0 / 418 (0%)	0 / 1,102	Yezid García Abello	FAU
Popular Power; Poder Popular		2023	Ecosocialism; Progressivism	Centre-left	0 / 32 (0%)	0 / 418 (0%)	0 / 1,102	Ernesto Samper	FAU

=== Parties of ethnic minorities ===
The following parties obtained representation in the congress despite not surpassing the required percentage, thanks to being in representation of ethnic minorities.

Party	Abbr.	Founded	Ideology	Political position	Senators	Seats in the House	Governors	Deputies	Mayors	Alliance
Indigenous and Social Alternative Movement; Movimiento Alternativo Indígena y Social	MAIS	2013	Indigenism; Ecologism; Progressivism; Agrarianism	Left-wing	1 / 108 (0.9%) (1 indigenous seat)	1 / 188 (0.5%) (1 indigenous seat)	2 / 32 (6%)	3 / 418 (0.7%)	21 / 1,102	FAU
Independent Social Alliance Movement; Alianza Social Independiente	ASI	1991	Reformism; Progressivism; Social democracy	Center-left	4 / 108 (4%)	0 / 188 (0%)	2 / 32 (6%)	14 / 418 (3%)	56 / 1,102	ApC
Indigenous Authorities of Colombia; Autoridades Indígenas de Colombia	AICO	1990	Indigenism; Progressivism	Left-wing to centre-left	1 / 108 (0.9%) (Indigenous seat)	0 / 188 (0%)	1 / 32 (3%)	0 / 418 (0%)	29 / 1,102	—N/a
Broad Democratic Alliance; Alianza Democrática Afrocolombiana	ADA	2007	Afro-Colombian interests; Environmentalism; Progressivism; Social democracy	Centre-left	2 / 108 (2%)	1 / 188 (0.5%) (Afro seat)	0 / 32 (0%)	0 / 418 (0%)	5 / 1,102	—N/a
Colombia Reborn; Colombia Renaciente		2018	Environmentalism; Pacifism; Pluralism; Progressivism; Social democracy	Centre-left	0 / 108 (0%)	1 / 188 (0.5%) (Afro seat)	0 / 32 (0%)	2 / 418 (0.5%)	10 / 1,102	ApC
Colombian Democratic Party; Partido Demócrata Colombiano	PD	2022	Environmentalism; Afro-Colombian interests; Social liberalism	Center-right	0 / 108 (0%)	1 / 188 (0.5%)	0 / 32 (0%)	0 / 418 (0%)	0 / 1,102	ApC
Colombian Ecologist Party; Partido Ecologista Colombiano	PEC	2022	Social democracy; Environmentalism; Progressivism	Center-left	0 / 108 (0%)	1 / 188 (0.5%)	0 / 32 (0%)	0 / 418 (0%)	0 / 1,102	FAU

== Defunct parties ==
- Christian National Party (2002)
- Christians for Community (2002)
- Alternative Way (2002)
- Alternative for Social Advance (2002)
- Citizens' Movement (2002)
- Citizens' Political Movement for Bocaya (2002)
- Civic People's Convergence (2002)
- Civic Purpose Colombia (2002)
- Coalition (2002)
- Colombia Always (2002)
- Colombian People's Party (2002)
- Colombian Social Democratic Party (2002)
- Comunitarian Party Option Seven (2002)
- Democratic Progressivity (2002)
- Democratic Unity Party (2002)
- Front of Hope (2002)
- Community Participation (2002-2000s)
- Citizens' Convergence (2002-2000s)
- Colombia Unite (2002-2000s)
- Colombian Community and Communal Political Movement (2002-2000s)
- Democratic Colombia Party (2003-2000s)
- For the Country of Our Dreams (2006)
- New Huila and Liberalism (2006)
- Citizen Option (2009)

== See also ==
- Lists of political parties
- Liberalism in Colombia
