= Fusagasugá City Council elections =

Municipal elections in Colombia

== 1988 Fusagasugá City Council election ==
The 1988 Fusagasugá City Council election was held on 13 March 1988, in accordance with Legislative Act 01 1986. In this election were elected the first mayors through popular vote.

== 1990 Fusagasugá City Council election ==
The 1990 Fusagasugá City Council election was held on 11 March 1990. Senators, representatives, deputies, councilors and mayors were elected.

== 1992 Fusagasugá City Council election ==
The 1992 Fusagasugá City Council election was held on 8 March 1992.

== 1994 Fusagasugá City Council election ==
The 1994 Fusagasugá City Council election in Fusagasugá, Colombia, was held on Sunday, 30 October 1994. According to Law 163 /94, elections of governors, mayors, deputies, town councilors, and aldermen or members of local administrative bodies, will be held on the last Sunday of October. At stake were all 15 seats in the City Council.

== 1997 Fusagasugá City Council election ==
The 1997 Fusagasugá City Council election was held on 26 October 1997. According to Law 163 /94, elections of governors, mayors, deputies, town councilors and aldermen or members of local administrative bodies, will be held on the last Sunday of October. At stake were all 15 seats in the City Council.

== 2000 Fusagasugá City Council election ==
The 2000 Fusagasugá City Council election was held on Sunday, 29 October 2000, to elect the City Council. At stake were all 15 seats in the City Council. The Liberal Party has held to Luis Cifuentes as President of Council from 2001 to 2002. The next President of Council was Chipatecua until his death in November 2002.

=== Results ===
← Summary of the 29 October 2000 Fusagasugá City Council election results →
Party	Vote			Seats	
Party	Votes	%	±pp	Won	+/−
Liberal Party			1	1	
Independent Movement of Absolute Renovation (MIRA)	0.000	0,0	New	1	-
Colombian Conservative Party	0.000	0,0	-	0	±0
Total	-	-		15	±0

== 2003 Fusagasugá City Council election ==
The 2003 Fusagasugá City Council election was held on 26 October 2003, to elect the first City Council since the 2002 reform (Legislative Act 2002). At stake were all 17 seats in the City Council.

=== Results ===
← Summary of the 28 October 2003 Fusagasugá City Council election results →
Party	Vote			Seats	
Party	Votes	%	±pp	Won	+/−
We are Colombia	5,677	16.36	▲	4	±0
Citizen Formers	5,247	15.12	▲	4	▲
Alternative Democratic Pole (POLO)	4,388	12.64	▼	3	±0
New Liberalism (Colombia)	4,346	12.52	▲	3	±0
Independent Movement of Absolute Renovation (MIRA)	1,793	5.17	▲	1	±0
Democratic Unity Party (Colombia)	1,747	5.03	▲	1	±0
Colombian Liberal Party (L)	1,280	3.69	▲	1	▲
National Movement (Colombia)	1,226	3.53	▲	0	±0
"Go Colombia"	638	1.84	▲	0	±0
Colombian Conservative Party (C)	595	1.71		0	
Citizens' Convergence	458	1.32	▲	0	±0

Parties with less of 1% of the vote	1,057	3.04	–	0	±0
New Party	292	0.84	▲	0	±0
Team Colombia	283	0.82	▲	0	±0
Living Colombia Movement	226	0.65	▲	0	±0
Christian National Party (Colombia)	196	0.56	▲	0	±0
Progressive National Movement	60	0.17	▲	0	±0

Blank ballots	2 216	6.39	▲		
Total	30 668	88.38		17	±0
Valid votes	30 668	88.38	▲		
Invalid votes	4 034	6.43	▼		
Votes cast / turnout	34 702	55.29	▼		
Abstentions	28 063	44.71	▲		
Registered voters	62 765				
Source: RNEC

== 2007 Fusagasugá City Council election ==
The 2007 Fusagasugá City Council election was held on 28 October 2007, to elect the second City Council since the 2002 reform (Legislative Act 2002). At stake were all 17 seats in the City Council.

=== Results ===
← Summary of the 28 October 2007 Fusagasugá City Council election results →
Party	Vote			Seats	
Party	Votes	%	±pp	Won	+/−
Colombian Liberal Party (L)	5 796	13.08	▲9.39	3	▲2
"U" Party (U)	5 452	12.30	New	3	▲3
Radical Change Party (CR)	3 641	8.22	New	2	▲2
Social Afrocolombian Alliance (ASA)	3 522	7.95	New	2	▲2
Democratic Colombia Party (DEMO)	3 190	7.20	New	1	▲1
Alternative Democratic Pole (POLO)	2 998	6.76	▼5.88	1	▼2
Citizens' Convergence (CONV)	2 325	5.25	▲3.93	1	▲1
Green Party (Colombia) (VERDE)	2 306	5.20	New	1	▲1
Afrocolombian National Party (AFRO)	2 177	4.91	New	1	▲1
Independent Movement of Absolute Renovation (MIRA)	2 124	4.79	▼0.38	1	±0
Liberal Opening Movement (AL)	1 737	3.92	New	1	▲1

Parties with 4.21% of the vote	1 869	4.21	–	0	±0
Colombian Conservative Party (C)	1 353	3.05	▲1.34	0	
Indigenous Social Alliance Movement (ASI)	516	1.16		0	

Blank ballots	2 356	5.32	▼1.07		
Total	39 493	89.11		17	±0
Valid votes	39 493	89.11	▲0.73		
Invalid votes	4 827	10.89	▼0.73		
Votes cast / turnout	44 320	62.24	▲6.96		
Abstentions	26 892	37.76	▼6.96		
Registered voters	71 212				
Source: RNEC

City council seats
L	17.65%
U	17.65%
CR	11.76%
ASA	11.76%
DEMO	5.88%
POLO	5.88%
CONV	5.88%
VERDE	5.88%
AFRO	5.88%
MIRA	5.88%
AL	5.88%

== 2011 Fusagasugá City Council election ==
The 2011 Fusagasugá City Council election was held on Sunday, 30 October 2011, to elect the third City Council since the 2002 reform (Legislative Act 2002). At stake were all 17 seats in the City Council.

=== Results ===
← Summary of the 30 October 2011 Fusagasugá City Council election results. →
Party	Vote			Seats	
Party	Votes	%	±pp	Won	+/−
"U" Party (U)	8 438	18.91	▲6.61	4	▲1
Colombian Liberal Party (L)	6 911	15.49	▲2.41	3	±0
Radical Change Party (CR)	4 741	10.63	▲2.41	2	±0
Colombian Conservative Party (C)	3 944	8.84	▲5.79	2	▲2
Green Party (Colombia) (VERDE)	3 588	8.04	▲2.84	1	±0
Independent Movement of Absolute Renovation (MIRA)	2 886	6.47	▲1.68	1	±0
Alternative Democratic Pole (POLO)	2 591	5.80	▼0.96	1	±0
National Integration Party (Colombia) (PIN)	2 560	5.73	New	1	▲1
Mio Party (MIO)	1 955	4.38	New	1	▲1
Afrovides Movement	1 832	4.10	New	1	▲1
Indigenous Authorities of Colombia (AICO)	1 722	3.86	New	0	±0

Parties with less than 3% of the vote	961	2.15	–	0	±0
Indigenous Social Alliance Movement (ASI)	961	2.15	New	0	±0

Blank ballots	2 471	5.54	▲0.22		
Total	44 600	100.00		17	±0
Valid votes	44 600	91.90	▲2.79		
Invalid votes	2 031	4.18	▼ -		
Unmarked votes	1 901	3.92	▼ -		
Votes cast / turnout	48 532	58.70	▼3.54		
Abstentions	34.142	41.30	▲3.54		
Registered voters	82 674				
Source: RNEC

City council seats
U	23.53%
L	17.65%
CR	11.76%
C	11.76%
VERDE	5.88%
MIRA	5.88%
POLO	5.88%
PIN	5.88%
MIO	5.88%
AFRO	5.88%

=== Aldermen election ===
On Fusagasugá is divided six comunes and five townships, every commune and township elect seven aldermen who conform the Local Administrator Council. The table shows the potential voters for every district.

District	2011		2011 Votes cast	
District	Number	%	Number	%
North Commune	9,577	13.05%	5,910	61.71%
East Commune	11,441	15.59%	6,811	59.53%
Center Commune (Note: The most density commune)	14,751	20.10%	8,918	60.45%
South-East Commune	10,591	14.43%	6,769	63.91%
West Commune	10,593	14.43%	5,866	55.37%
South-West Commune	5,929	8.07%	3,732	62.94%
Commune: Total	62,882	85.69%	38,006	60.44%
North Township	1,154	1.57%	673	58.31%
East Township	1,591	2.16%	779	48.96%
West Township	2,457	3.34%	1,362	55.43%
Southeast Township	2,143	2.92%	1,368	63.83%
Southwest Township	3,155	4.29%	1,726	54.70%
Township: Total	10,500	14.30%	5,908	56.26%
Total	73,382	100.00%	43,914	59.84%

== 2015 Fusagasugá City Council election ==
The 2015 Fusagasugá City Council election was held on 25 October 2015, to elect the fourth City Council since the 2002 reform (Legislative Act 2002). At stake were all 17 seats in the City Council. There are twenty polling stations authorized by the Registradury.

=== Results ===
← Summary of the 25 October 2015 Fusagasugá City Council election results. →
Party	Vote			Seats	
Party	Votes	%	±bp	Won	+/−
"U" Party (U)	8.556	16,8	▼210	3	▼1
Colombian Liberal Party (L)	7.653	15,0	▼45	3	±0
Democratic Center	5.604	11,0	New	2	▲2
Radical Change Party (CR)	5.272	10,4	▼27	2	±0
Colombian Conservative Party (C)	3.595	7,1	▼178	1	▼1
Indigenous Social Alliance Movement (ASI)	3.013	5,9	▲377	1	▲1
Green Party (Colombia) (VERDE)	2.926	5,8	▼229	1	±0
Independent Movement of Absolute Renovation (MIRA)	2.893	5,7	▼78	1	±0
Alternative Democratic Pole (POLO)	2.598	5,1	▼70	1	±0
MAIS	2.515	4,9	New	1	▲1
Civic Option (PIN)	2.367	4,7	▼109	1	±0

Parties with less than 3% of the vote	0	-	-	-	-

Blank ballots	3,884	7.6	▲209		
Total	50,876	100%		17	±0
Valid votes	50.876	92,6	▲75		
Invalid votes	2.101	3,8	▼36		
Unmarked votes	1.938	3,5	▼39		
Votes cast / turnout	54.915	57,5	▼120		
Abstentions	40.662	42,5	▲120		
Registered voters	95,577	100%	▲15.6%		
Source: RNEC

Vote share
U	16.82%
L	15.04%
CD	11.02%
CR	10.36%
C	7.07%
ASI	5.92%
VERDE	5.75%
MIRA	5.69%
POLO	5.11%
MAIS	4.94%
PIN	4.65%
Blank votes	7.6%

City council seats
U	17.65%
L	17.65%
CD	11.76%
CR	11.76%
C	5.88%
ASI	5.88%
VERDE	5.88%
MIRA	5.88%
POLO	5.88%
MAIS	5.88%
PIN	5.88%

=== Polling vote ===
Polling Vote
Zone	Code	Name polling vote	Address	Potential women	Potential men	Potential voters	Voting	Comune
01	1	Escuela Julio Sabogal	Cl 3 # 8 - 34-comuna Norte	4	3	7	2	North
02	2	Colegio Jose Celestino Mutis	Kr 1 Este # 23 - 03 Comuna Suroriental	3	2	4	1	South East
01	6	Colegio Santander	Cl 9 # 8-47-comuna Centro	6	2	8	2	Center
99	30	Cucharal	Escuela Cucharal - Corregimiento Occidental	2	2	4	1	C. West
99	01	La Aguadita	Salón Comunal La Aguadita	702	702	1	1	
90	01	Colegio Teodoro Aya Villaveces	Carrera 6 Con Calle 16	4	4	9	2	East
01	4	Escuela Gustavo Vega	Cl 2 # 2-25 Este Comuna Oriental	2	1	3	1	East
99	50	La Puerta (Chinauta)	Colegio Luis Carlos GalÁn- correg Sur	1	2	3	1	C. South
02	5	Escuela Refugio Infantil	Km 3 Vía A Melgar	3	2	5	1	
01	2	Colegio Accion Comunal	Kr 1ª # 8-08 Norte-comuna Norte	2	2	4	1	North
99	36	Bochica (Latrinidad)	Escuela La Trinidad	1	1	2	1	
02	3	Universidad de Cundinamarca	Dg. 18 # 20 - 29 - Comuna Occidental	4	3	6	2	West
99	25	Pekin Primer Sector	Oficina De La Corregidura	971	950	2	1	
02	1	Escuela Fusacatan	Kr 4ª#20-21-comuna Sur Oriental	4	5	10	2	South East
98	01	Carcel Circuito Judicial	Kr 8ª # 7 - 51	19	125	144	1	
01	5	Parroquia Ntra.sra.de Belen	Cl 7 # 5-20 Comuna Centro	5	3	7	2	Center
02	6	Polideportivo Ebenezer	Cl 18 - Kr 52 - SalÓn Comunal Ebenezer	2	1	3	1	South West
01	3	Coliseo Futsal Coburgo	Carrera 3 No. 14a - 68	2	7	9	2	East
99	38	El Triunfo (Boquerón)	Salon Comunal de Boquerón	472	519	991	1	
02	4	Colegio Ricaurte	Diagonal 21 No. 17a - 41	4	2	6	2	West

== 2019 Fusagasugá City Council election ==
The 2019 Fusagasugá City Council election was held on Sunday, 27 October 2019, to elect the fifth City Council since the 2002 reform (Legislative Act 2002). At stake were all 17 seats in the City Council. There are twenty polling stations authorized by the Registradury.

=== Results ===
← Summary of the 27 October 2015 Fusagasugá City Council election results. →
Party	Vote			Seats		Diff
Party	Votes	%	±bp	Won	±	±votes
"U" Party (U)	9.061	15,8	▼100	3	±0	▲566
Democratic Center	6.666	11,7	▲72	2	±0	▲1.163
Colombian Liberal Party (L)	5.418	9,4	▼564	2	▼1	▼2.228
Colombian Conservative Party (C)	5.019	8,8	▲173	2	▲1	▲1.478
Green Party (Colombia) (VERDE)	4.836	8,5	▲273	2	▲1	▲1.965
Radical Change Party (CR)	4.346	7,5	▼285	1	▼1	▼940
MAIS	3.807	6,6	▲161	1	±0	▲1.265
Alternative Democratic Pole (POLO)	3.134	5,4	▲26	1	±0	▲500
Independent Movement of Absolute Renovation (MIRA)	2.843	4,9	▼74	1	±0	▼39
Indigenous Social Alliance Movement (ASI)	2.353	4,2	▼169	1	±0	▼573
REN	1.711	3,0	New	0		

Parties with less than 3% of the vote	3.391	5.9	-	-	-	-
ADA	1.260	2,2	New	0		
AICO	946	1,6	New	0		
Justa Libres Colombia	865	1,5	New	0		
PRE	334	0,6	New	0		

Blank ballots	4.770	8.3	▲64			▲886
Total votes	57.369	100%		17	±0	▲6.799
Valid votes	57.369	92,9	▲24			
Invalid votes	1.753	2,8	▼130			
Unmarked votes	2.680	4,3	▲47			
Votes cast / turnout	61.802	58,4	▲93			
Abstentions	44.555	41,6	▼93			
Registered voters	106.357	100%				
Source: RNEC

Vote share
U	15.82%
CD	11.73%
L	9.41%
C	8.80%
VERDE	8.48%
CR	7.51%
MAIS	6.55%
POLO	5.37%
MIRA	4.95%
ASI	4.23%
REN	3.00%
ADA	2.17%
AICO	1.62%
LIB	1.47%
PRE	0.61%
Blank votes	8.3%

City council seats
U	17.65%
CD	17.65%
L	11.76%
C	11.76%
V	11.76%
CR	5.88%
MAIS	5.88%
POLO	5.88%
MIRA	5.88%
ASI	5.88%

=== Polling vote ===
Polling Vote
Zone	Code	Name polling vote	Address	Potential women	Potential men	Potential voters	Voting	Comune
02	04	Colegio Ricaurte	Diagonal 21 No. 17a - 41	4	2	6	2	West
02	05	Universidad de Cundinamarca	Dg. 18 # 20 - 29	4	3	6	2	West
01	1	Escuela Julio Sabogal	Cl 3 # 8 - 34	4	3	7	2	North
02	2	Colegio Jose Celestino Mutis	Kr 1 Este # 23 - 03 Comuna Suroriental	3	2	4	1	South East
01	6	Colegio Santander	Cl 9 # 8-47	6	2	8	2	Center
99	30	Cucharal	Escuela Cucharal - Corregimiento Occidental	2	2	4	1	C. West
99	01	La Aguadita	Salón Comunal La Aguadita	702	702	1	1	
90	01	Colegio Teodoro Aya Villaveces	Carrera 6 Con Calle 16	4	4	9	2	East
01	4	Escuela Gustavo Vega	Cl 2 # 2-25 Este	2	1	3	1	East
99	50	La Puerta (Chinauta)	Colegio Luis Carlos GalÁn- correg Sur	1	2	3	1	C. South
02	05	Escuela Refugio Infantil	Km 3 Vía A Melgar	3	2	5	1	
01	02	Colegio Accion Comunal	Kr 1ª # 8-08 Norte	2	2	4	1	North
99	36	Bochica (Latrinidad)	Escuela La Trinidad	1	1	2	1	
99	25	Pekin Primer Sector	Oficina De La Corregidura	971	950	2	1	
02	1	Escuela Fusacatan	Kr 4 20-21	4	5	10	2	South East
98	01	Carcel Circuito Judicial	Kr 8ª # 7 - 51	19	125	144	1	
01	5	Parroquia Ntra.sra.de Belen	Cl 7 # 5-20	5	3	7	2	Center
02	6	Polideportivo Ebenezer	Cl 18 - Kr 52 Comunal Place Ebenezer	2	1	3	1	South West
01	3	Coliseo Futsal Coburgo	Carrera 3 No. 14a - 68	2	7	9	2	East
99	38	El Triunfo (Boquerón)	Comunal Place Boquerón	47.200	51.900	99.100	-	
02	04	Colegio Ricaurte	Diagonal 21 No. 17a - 41	4	2	6	2	West
00		TOTAL						106.
