= 1998 Colombian parliamentary election =

Congressional elections were held in Colombia on 8 March 1998 to elect the Senate and Chamber of Representatives. The result was a victory for the Liberal Party, which won 84 of the 161 seats in the Chamber and 48 of the 102 seats in the Senate.

== Results ==
=== Senate ===
Party	Votes	%	Seats	+/–
Colombian Liberal Party	3,897,272	44.88	48	–8
Colombian Conservative Party	1,000,032	11.52	15	–5
Conservative National Movement	442,767	5.10	7	+6
Liberal Oxygen Movement	158,184	1.82	2	–
Civic Defence Movement	127,248	1.47	2	–
National Popular Alliance	111,531	1.28	1	0
Progressive National Movement	108,607	1.25	2	+1
Citizens' Movement	107,680	1.24	1	–
Civic People's Convergence	104,836	1.21	1	–
New Democratic Force	100,643	1.16	1	–
Independent Social Alliance Movement	95,523	1.10	2	+2
National Democratic Reconstruction	83,707	0.96	1	–
National Salvation Movement	82,687	0.95	1	–1
Bolivarian Movement for the New Colombia	70,581	0.81	1	–
Vamos Colombia	65,824	0.76	1	–
Christian Union Movement	53,753	0.62	0	–1
Movement '98	46,648	0.54	1	–
C4	44,859	0.52	1	0
Force Colombia	44,587	0.51	0	–
Colombian People's Party	44,510	0.51	1	–
Education and Social Change	44,347	0.51	1	–
Independent Conservatism	43,908	0.51	1	0
Front of Hope	41,608	0.48	1	–
Colombia My Country	40,661	0.47	1	–
Citizens' Participation Movement	39,276	0.45	0	–
Laicists for Colombia	38,412	0.44	1	0
Humbertista Movement	37,782	0.44	0	–
Independent Liberal Restoration Movement	36,194	0.42	0	–1
Political Attitudes Renovation Movement	36,194	0.42	0	–
Revolutionary Independent Labour Movement	35,956	0.41	0	–
The Collective Movement	32,459	0.37	0	–
Solidarity Option Movement	30,952	0.36	0	–
National Civic Concentration	25,967	0.30	0	0
Independent Civic Movement	25,387	0.29	0	–1
Progressive Force	23,961	0.28	0	0
Colombian Communist Party	23,613	0.27	0	–1
Democratic Renovation Movement	20,888	0.24	0	0
National Reserves' Alliance	20,512	0.24	0	–
Women 2000	19,791	0.23	0	–
Colombian Community and Communal Political Movement	19,510	0.22	0	–
Indigenous Authorities of Colombia	18,224	0.21	1	0
Hands Together Movement	17,797	0.20	0	–
Colombian Collective Mission Movement	17,677	0.20	0	–
Colombian Indigenous Movement	17,381	0.20	0	–1
Metapolitical Unitary Movement	16,363	0.19	0	–1
Citizens' Convergence	15,312	0.18	0	–
Palenque Black Communities	13,797	0.16	0	–
Socialist Renovation Current	13,254	0.15	0	–
Democratic Alliance M19	13,166	0.15	0	0
Citizens in Training Movement	12,845	0.15	0	–
For Recreation and Sport	8,965	0.10	0	–
New Colombia Movement	8,707	0.10	0	–1
Democratic Integration Movement	8,472	0.10	0	–
National Integration Movement	7,737	0.09	0	–
Serious Civic Movement for Colombia	7,276	0.08	0	–
19th of April Movement	5,459	0.06	0	0
Ecological Civic Party	3,915	0.05	0	–
Colombian Agricultural Movement	3,381	0.04	0	–
People's Participation Movement	3,241	0.04	0	–
Ecological Orientation Movement	1,642	0.02	0	–
Coalitions	609,972	7.02	7	+5
Others	67,380	0.78	0	–
Blank	362,860	4.18	–	–
Total	8,683,680	100.00	102	0
Valid votes	8,683,680	91.78		
Invalid votes	777,538	8.22		
Total votes	9,461,218	100.00		
Registered voters/turnout	20,823,769	45.43		
Source: Barrero et al.

=== Chamber of Representatives ===
Party	Votes	%	Seats	+/–
Colombian Liberal Party	4,022,739	45.11	84	–4
Colombian Conservative Party	1,212,419	13.60	28	–12
Conservative National Movement	296,313	3.32	4	–2
New Democratic Force	140,810	1.58	2	+2
Independent Conservatism	116,221	1.30	2	+1
Progressive Force	110,648	1.24	4	0
Civic People's Convergence	109,573	1.23	2	–
Citizens' Movement	90,927	1.02	1	–
Serious Civic Movement for Colombia	80,528	0.90	1	–
New Colombia Movement	73,348	0.82	1	–1
Regional Integration Movement	65,507	0.73	2	+1
Democratic Alternative Movement	64,695	0.73	1	+1
Laicists for Colombia	54,177	0.61	0	0
National Salvation Movement	53,074	0.60	1	0
Force Colombia	46,370	0.52	0	–
Colombian People's Party	44,322	0.50	0	–
Metapolitical Unitary Movement	44,258	0.50	0	–
Colombia My Country	43,673	0.49	0	–
People's Participation Movement	41,059	0.46	1	–
Christian Union Movement	40,687	0.46	0	0
Christian National Party	40,311	0.45	1	0
Progressive National Movement	40,091	0.45	1	0
Liberal Oxygen Movement	39,706	0.45	0	–
Liberal Opening Movement	39,194	0.44	1	–
Front of Hope	34,829	0.39	1	–
Vamos Colombia	33,598	0.38	0	–
Democratic Renovation Movement	32,499	0.36	0	0
Humbertista Movement	30,641	0.34	1	–
Socialist Renovation Current	29,265	0.33	0	–
Political Attitudes Renovation Movement	28,279	0.32	0	–
Independent Civic Movement	26,674	0.30	1	+1
Citizens' Participation Movement	23,749	0.27	0	–
Independent Social Alliance Movement	21,294	0.24	2	+1
Arena Movement	21,043	0.24	0	–
C4	20,930	0.23	0	0
Indigenous Authorities of Colombia	20,377	0.23	0	0
Democratic Integration Movement	19,084	0.21	0	–
For Recreation and Sport	18,565	0.21	0	–
National Civic Concentration	18,046	0.20	0	0
Bolivarian Movement for the New Colombia	16,474	0.18	0	–
Civic Defence Movement	14,628	0.16	0	–
Democratic Alliance M19	14,598	0.16	0	–
Colombian Community and Communal Political Movement	14,019	0.16	0	–
Education and Social Change	13,342	0.15	0	–
National Movement of Pensioners	12,933	0.15	0	–
People's Civic Independent Front	10,923	0.12	0	–
19th of April Movement	10,722	0.12	0	–1
Movement '98	8,840	0.10	0	–
Revolutionary Independent Labour Movement	8,755	0.10	0	–
Colombian Indigenous Movement	7,930	0.09	0	0
The Collective Movement	7,582	0.09	0	–
Ecological Civic Party	7,431	0.08	0	–
National Movement of Black Communities	7,402	0.08	0	–1
Citizens in Training Movement	7,093	0.08	0	–
Colombian Collective Mission Movement	5,294	0.06	0	–
National Democratic Reconstruction	4,278	0.05	0	–
Women 2000	3,403	0.04	0	–
Solidarity Option Movement	3,271	0.04	0	–
National Popular Alliance	2,216	0.02	0	0
Colombian Agricultural Movement	1,503	0.02	0	–
Citizens' Convergence	1,205	0.01	0	–
Hands Together Movement	955	0.01	0	–
Ecological Orientation Movement	858	0.01	0	–
Colombian Communist Party	484	0.01	0	0
Coalitions	825,166	9.25	16	+15
Others	179,119	2.01	3	–
Blank votes	436,784	4.90	–	–
Total	8,916,731	100.00	161	–2
Valid votes	8,916,731	94.15		
Invalid votes	554,382	5.85		
Total votes	9,471,113	100.00		
Registered voters/turnout	20,823,769	45.48		
Source: Nohlen, Barrero et al., Global Elections Database
