= 2006 Colombian parliamentary election =

Congressional elections were held in Colombia on March 12, 2006 to elect members of the Senate and Chamber of Representatives. Presidential primaries were also held for the Liberal Party and the Alternative Democratic Pole prior to the upcoming presidential elections in May.

== Chamber of Representatives ==
Party	Votes	%	Seats
Colombian Liberal Party	1,639,593	18.51	35
Social Party of National Unity	1,434,919	16.20	30
Colombian Conservative Party	1,347,904	15.22	29
Radical Change	917,912	10.36	20
Alternative Democratic Pole	677,964	7.66	7
Citizens' Convergence	385,589	4.35	8
Wings – Team Colombia	366,766	4.14	8
Independent Movement of Absolute Renovation	241,704	2.73	1
Liberal Opening Movement	222,033	2.51	5
Democratic Colombia Party	213,077	2.41	2
National Movement	172,476	1.95	2
United People's Movement	133,324	1.51	2
For the Country of Our Dreams	103,795	1.17	2
Regional Integration Movement	93,394	1.05	4
Centre Option Party	88,268	1.00	1
C4	82,673	0.93	0
New Huila and Liberalism	81,335	0.92	2
Social Action Party	53,217	0.60	1
Visionaries with Antanas Mockus	47,217	0.53	0
Let the Moreno Play Movement	37,239	0.42	0
Renovation Movement Labour Action	34,082	0.38	1
Colombian Community and Communal Political Movement	28,956	0.33	0
Living Colombia Movement	28,389	0.32	0
National Salvation Movement	27,531	0.31	1
Independent Social Alliance Movement	27,378	0.31	0
Republican Movement	22,513	0.25	0
People's Participation Movement	19,773	0.22	1
Indigenous Authorities of Colombia	17,632	0.20	0
Community Participation	12,480	0.14	0
Progressive National Movement	7,932	0.09	1
Colombia Unite	6,631	0.07	0
People's Will Movement	5,467	0.06	0
Independent Conservatism	4,604	0.05	0
National Democratic Reconstruction	3,428	0.04	0
Citizens' Footprint Movement	2,693	0.03	0
Colombian Social Democratic Party	1,686	0.02	0
We are Colombia	1,039	0.01	0
Yes Colombia	797	0.01	0
Independent Civic Movement	739	0.01	0
Colombia Always	441	0.00	0
New Liberalism	295	0.00	0
Democratic Unity Party	294	0.00	0
Democratic Progressivity	171	0.00	0
Citizens' Movement	132	0.00	0
National Popular Alliance	68	0.00	0
Progressive Force	40	0.00	0
Blank votes	260,579	2.94	–
Total	8,856,169	100.00	163
Valid votes	8,856,169	83.05	
Invalid votes	1,807,014	16.95	
Total votes	10,663,183	100.00	
Registered voters/turnout	26,593,271	40.10	
Afro-Colombian seats
Afro-Colombian Social Alliance	7,682	5.67	1
AFROUNINCCA	6,833	5.04	1
Black Roots	6,287	4.64	0
CORPOSINPAC	5,497	4.06	0
FUNDECON	5,385	3.98	0
ASOPRA	5,065	3.74	0
United Corporation for Afro Culture	4,829	3.57	0
Organisation of Afro-Colombian Women	4,465	3.30	0
APONURY	4,367	3.22	0
National Association of Afro-Colombian Students	4,333	3.20	0
National Cimarron Movement	4,205	3.10	0
ACIA	3,183	2.35	0
Tambor Yoruba Foundation	2,850	2.10	0
ANALDIC	2,281	1.68	0
Afro-Colombian Malcolm X	1,756	1.30	0
AFIN	1,729	1.28	0
DESPERTAR	1,640	1.21	0
CINDENT	1,592	1.18	0
Afro-Colombian Exchange of Experiences Association	1,526	1.13	0
FUNDECONA	1,483	1.09	0
FUNDAIN	1,334	0.98	0
Pacific Coexistence Organisation	1,255	0.93	0
Coagro Pacifico LTDA	1,111	0.82	0
CANOAS	936	0.69	0
ASOPACIFICO	920	0.68	0
CECPCC	828	0.61	0
APDDEC	781	0.58	0
Blank votes	51,298	37.87	–
Total	135,451	100.00	2
Indigenous seat
Alternative Democratic Pole	29,308	21.47	1
Independent Social Alliance Movement	18,956	13.89	0
Community Participation	8,637	6.33	0
Indigenous Authorities of Colombia	7,058	5.17	0
Colombian Community and Communal Political Movement	5,950	4.36	0
Colombia Unite	3,348	2.45	0
Blank votes	63,257	46.34	–
Total	136,514	100.00	1
Source: Barrero et al.

== Senate ==
In the two-seat indigenous constituency, more blank votes were cast than votes for parties, resulting in a re-run being required. This took place with the same parties (AICO and ASI) but difference candidates.

Party	Votes	%	Seats
Social Party of National Unity	1,591,775	17.30	20
Colombian Conservative Party	1,470,029	15.98	18
Colombian Liberal Party	1,436,657	15.62	18
Radical Change	1,211,457	13.17	15
Alternative Democratic Pole	875,451	9.52	10
Citizens' Convergence	566,823	6.16	7
Wings – Team Colombia	418,124	4.54	5
Democratic Colombia Party	272,524	2.96	3
Independent Movement of Absolute Renovation	237,512	2.58	2
Living Colombia Movement	229,556	2.50	2
For the Country of Our Dreams	165,981	1.80	0
Let the Moreno Play Movement	136,636	1.49	0
C4	86,609	0.94	0
Visionaries with Antanas Mockus	71,843	0.78	0
Community Participation	54,356	0.59	0
Colombian Community and Communal Political Movement	37,545	0.41	0
Colombia Unite	15,568	0.17	0
Independent Conservatism	13,221	0.14	0
Progressive National Movement	8,794	0.10	0
National Democratic Reconstruction	7,751	0.08	0
Blank votes	291,864	3.17	–
Total	9,200,076	100.00	100
Valid votes	9,200,076	85.24	
Invalid votes	1,593,332	14.76	
Total votes	10,793,408	100.00	
Registered voters/turnout	26,595,171	40.58	
Indigenous seats
Independent Social Alliance Movement	43,903	27.02	1
Indigenous Authorities of Colombia	21,624	13.31	1
Blank votes	96,948	59.67	–
Total	162,475	100.00	2
Source: RNEC

== Senate Members ==
circumscription	Party	Senator
National	Social Party of National Unity (U)	Dilian Francisca Toro; Gina Parody; Marta Lucía Ramírez; José David Name; Armando Benedetti; Jairo Clopatofsky; Manuel Enríquez Rosero; Carlos García Orjuela; Carlos Ferro; Carlos Cárdenas Ortiz; Jorge Visbal Martelo (after the death of Luis Guillermo Vélez); Ricardo Arias (after Jairo Enrique Merlano renounced); Aurelio Iragorri; Adriana Gutiérrez; Piedad Zuccardi; Manuel Guillermo Mora; Mauricio Pimiento (suspended, substituted by Juan Carlos Vélez Uribe); Zulema Jattin Corrales; Efraín Torrado; Luis Elmer Arenas Parra
National	Colombian Conservative Party (C)	Roberto Gerlein; Ciro Ramírez; Germán Villegas; William Montes (suspended, substituted by Milton Rodríguez); Hernán Andrade; Juan Manuel Corzo Román; Eduardo Enríquez Maya; Alfonso Núñez Lapeira; Iván Díaz Mateus; Luis Humberto Gómez Gallo; Efraín Cepeda; Omar Yepes; José Darío Salazar; Ubeimar Delgado; Julio Manzur Abdala; Alirio Villamizar; Manuel Ramiro Velásquez; Jorge Hernando Pedraza
National	Colombian Liberal Party (L)	Juan Manuel López Cabrales (suspended, substituted by Yolanda Pinto de Gaviria); Juan Manuel Galán; Luis Fernando Duque; Juan Fernando Cristo; Mario Nader Muskus; Piedad Córdoba Ruiz; Cecilia López Montaño; Guillermo Gaviria Zapata; Víctor Renán Barco; Germán Aguirre; Mauricio Jaramillo; Carlos Julio González; Héctor Helí Rojas; Hugo Serrano Gómez; Jesús Ignacio García; Luis Fernando Velasco; Álvaro Antonio Ashton Giraldo; Camilo Sánchez Ortega
National	Radical Change Party (CR)	Germán Vargas Lleras; Ramón Elías López (after the death of Mario Londoño Arcila); Claudia de Castellanos; Humberto Builes (after the renunciation of Luis Carlos Torres); Rubén Darío Quintero; Arturo Char Chaljub; Nancy Patricia Gutiérrez; Miguel Pinedo Vidal; Javier Cáceres Leal; Reginaldo Montes (suspended, substituted by Elsa Gladys Cifuentes); Juan Carlos Restrepo; Bernabé Celis; Plinio Olano Becerra; Antonio Guerra de la Espriella; David Char Navas
National	Alternative Democratic Pole (PDA)	Gustavo Petro Urrego; Jorge Robledo Castillo; Parmenio Cuéllar Bastidas; Néstor Iván Moreno Rojas; Jaime Dussán; Alexander López; Gloria Inés Ramírez; Jorge Eliécer Guevara; Luis Carlos Avellaneda; Jesús Bernal Amorocho
National	Partido Convergencia Ciudadana	Edgar Espíndola Niño (after the renunciation of Luis Alberto Gil); Óscar Josué Reyes; Luis Eduardo Vives (suspended, substituted by Miguel Jesús Arenas Prada); Carlos Emiro Barriga; Juan Carlos Martínez; Gabriel Acosta Bendek; Samuel Arrieta Buelvas
National	Movimiento Alas Equipo Colombia	Óscar Suárez Mira; Oscar Darío Pérez; Jorge Ballesteros; Gabriel Zapata Correa; Antonio Valencia Duque (after the renunciation of Álvaro Araújo Castro )
National	Partido Colombia Democrática	Ricardo Ariel Elcure Chacón (after the renunciation of Mario Uribe Escobar); José Gonzalo Gutiérrez (after the renunciation of Miguel Alfonso de la Espriella); Luzelena Restrepo (after the renunciation of Álvaro Alfonso García)
National	Movimiento Independiente de Renovación Absoluta (MIRA)	Alexandra Moreno Piraquive; Manuel Antonio Virgüez; Carlos Alberto Baena
National	Movimiento Colombia Viva	Dieb Maloof Cuse (suspended, substituted by Jorge Castro Pacheco, Vicente Blel Saad y ahora por Jorge Enrique Gómez); Habib Merheg Marun
Indigenous	Alianza Social Indígena (ASI)	Jesús Piñacué Achicué
Indigenous	Autoridades Indígenas de Colombia (AICO)	Ramiro Estacio

- Of the 102 elected congressman and women that took office on July 20, 2006. 52 were re-elected, 25 had previously served in the Chamber of Representatives of Colombia in the 2002–2006 term, 3 returned to the senate after a few years of absence and 22 were elected to congress for the first time.

== See also ==
- Spanish language Wikinews article
