= 2015 Colombian regional and municipal elections =

- October 25, 2015

The 2015 Colombian regional and municipal elections were held on Sunday, 25 October 2015 in Colombia to elect the governors of the 32 departments, deputies to departmental assemblies, mayors of 1,102 municipalities, municipal councillors and aldermen on local administrative boards (Juntas Administrativas Locales, JAL).

== Electoral systems ==
The governors of Colombia's 32 departments are elected to a single four-year term by first-past-the-post. The governor is considered the head of the local administration, but also the president's agent in the department to maintain public order and implement national policies. Each department has a departmental assembly (asamblea departamental), with between 11 and 31 members depending on the department's population, whose members are elected using the same electoral system as that used for congressional elections - namely, optional open party-list proportional representation with the threshold being equal to half of the electoral quotient. Political parties choose whether their lists are 'preferential' (open) or 'non-preferential' (closed). Candidates on the party's open list are reordered based on the results, although votes cast only for the party rather than a candidate only count for purposes of seat allocation between parties.

The mayors of Colombia's 1,102 municipalities are elected to single four-year term by first-past-the-post. The mayor is the head of the local administrative and the legal representative of the municipality. Each municipality has a municipal council (consejo municipal) made up of 7 to 21 members depending on the municipality's population. Municipal councillors are elected using the same electoral system used for departmental assemblies.

Municipalities may be further subdivide themselves into comunas (in urban areas) and corregimientos municipales (in rural areas) which are administered by a local administrative board (Juntas Administrativas Locales, JAL).

Bogotá, the capital, has a special constitutional status as Capital District. Despite being the capital of Cundinamarca department, the government of Cundinamarca has no authority over Bogotá's territory and the city's inhabitants do not vote for the governor of Cundinamarca. While Bogotá is counted as a municipality, it has the powers of both departments and municipalities. The capital is administered by a directly elected Superior Mayor (Alcalde mayor) and has a 45-member council, both serving four-year terms. Bogotá is subdivided into 20 localities (localidades) each with their own JAL of at least 7 members and a local mayor appointed by the superior mayor from a list submitted by the JAL.

Mayors and governors may not serve consecutive terms, but may be reelected to non-consecutive terms. Members of assemblies, councils and local administrative boards have no term limits.

== Mayoral elections ==
=== Bogotá ===
- Population: 7,878,783 (2015 est.)
- Incumbent mayor: Gustavo Petro (Prog.)

==== Candidates ====
- Enrique Peñalosa: former Superior Mayor of Bogotá (1998–2000), former Representative for Bogotá (1990–1992). 2014 Green Alliance presidential candidate. Independent candidate supported by Radical Change.
- Rafael Pardo: former Minister of Labour (2011–2014), former interim Superior Mayor of Bogotá (2014), former Minister of Defence (1991–1994). 2010 Liberal presidential candidate. Candidate of the Liberal Party and the Party of the U.
- Clara López Obregón: president of the Alternative Democratic Pole (2010–2011, 2012–2016), former Acting Superior Mayor of Bogotá (2011), former Secretary of Government of Bogotá (2008–2010). 2014 Alternative Democratic Pole presidential candidate. Candidate of the Alternative Democratic Pole, supported by the Patriotic Union and the Indigenous and Social Alternative Movement.
- Francisco Santos Calderón: former Vice President of Colombia (2002–2010). Candidate of the Democratic Center

==== Results ====
| Candidate | Party | Votes | % |
|---|---|---|---|
| Enrique Peñalosa | Recuperemos Bogotá–CR–Conservative | 906,058 | 33.18 |
| Rafael Pardo | Liberal–Party of the U | 778,764 | 28.52 |
| Clara López Obregón | Polo–UP–MAIS | 499,598 | 18.30 |
| Francisco Santos Calderón | Democratic Center | 327,598 | 12.00 |
| Ricardo Arias Mora | Libres | 90,288 | 3.31 |
| Daniel Raisbeck | Libertarian Movement | 20,233 | 0.74 |
| Alexandre Vernot | People, Land and Fire Movement | 7,306 | 0.27 |
| Withdrawn | Green Alliance | 960 | 0.04 |
| Withdrawn | Progressive Movement | 633 | 0.02 |
| Blank votes | | 99,134 | 3.63 |
| Total | | 2,730,572 | 100.00 |
| Valid votes | | 2,730,572 | 97.14 |
| Invalid votes | | 80,260 | 2.86 |
| Total votes | | 2,810,832 | 100.00 |
| Registered voters/turnout | | 5,453,086 | 51.55 |
Source: RNEC

=== Medellín (Antioquia) ===
- Population: 2,464,322 (2015 est.)
- Incumbent mayor: Aníbal Gaviria (Liberal)

==== Candidates ====
- Federico Gutiérrez: former Medellín municipal councillor (2004–2011)
- Juan Carlos Vélez Uribe: former Senator (2010–2014)
- Gabriel Jaime Rico: former Medellín municipal councillor (2001–2007)
- Alonso Salazar: former mayor of Medellín (2008–2011)
- Eugenio Prieto Soto: former Senator (2010–2014), former caretaker Governor of Antioquia (2002–2003). Withdrew

==== Results ====
| Candidate | Party | Votes | % |
|---|---|---|---|
| Federico Gutiérrez | Movimiento Creemos | 246,221 | 35.81 |
| Juan Carlos Vélez | Democratic Center | 236,632 | 34.42 |
| Gabriel Jaime Rico | Grand Alliance for Medellín (U–PCC–CR) | 111,796 | 16.26 |
| Alonso Salazar | Green Alliance–ASI | 37,241 | 5.42 |
| Hector Manuel Hoyos Meneses | Alternative Democratic Pole | 8,934 | 1.30 |
| Eugenio Prieto Soto (withdrawn) | Colombian Liberal Party | 1,606 | 0.23 |
| Blank votes | | 45,086 | 6.56 |
| Total | | 687,516 | 100.00 |
| Valid votes | | 687,516 | 93.37 |
| Invalid votes | | 48,823 | 6.63 |
| Total votes | | 736,339 | 100.00 |
| Registered voters/turnout | | 1,486,004 | 49.55 |
Source: RNEC

=== Cali (Valle del Cauca) ===
- Population: 2,394,925 (2015 est.)
- Incumbent mayor: Rodrigo Guerrero (Ind.)

==== Candidates ====
- Maurice Armitage: businessman, president of Siderúrgica de Occidente (Sidoc)
- Roberto Ortiz Urueña: former Representative (2010–2014)
- Angelino Garzón: former vice president (2010–2014), former governor of the Valle del Cauca (2004–2007), former ambassador of Colombia to the United Nations (2009–2010), former Minister of Labour and Social Protection (2000–2002)
- Michel Maya: Cali municipal councillor (since 2011)
- Wilson Arias: former Representative (2010–2014), former Cali municipal councillor (2007–2009)
- Carlos Holguín: former Secretary of Government of Cali (1998–2000, 2012–2014)
- María Isabel Urrutia: former Representative (2002–2010), retired athlete and 2000 Olympic gold medallist (Weightlifting)

==== Results ====
| Candidate | Party | Votes | % |
|---|---|---|---|
| Maurice Armitage | Creemos con Armitage | 265,230 | 38.23 |
| Roberto Ortiz | Colombian Liberal Party | 176,358 | 25.42 |
| Angelino Garzón | Social Party of National Unity | 152,471 | 21.98 |
| Michel Maya | Green Alliance | 23,153 | 3.34 |
| Wilson Arias | Alternative Democratic Pole | 17,518 | 2.53 |
| Carlos Holguín | Colombian Conservative Party | 15,776 | 2.27 |
| María Isabel Urrutia | Indigenous and Social Alternative Movement | 5,621 | 0.81 |
| María Isabel Larrarte | Indigenous Authorities of Colombia | 2,315 | 0.33 |
| Blank votes | | 35,265 | 5.08 |
| Total | | 693,707 | 100.00 |
| Valid votes | | 693,707 | 94.86 |
| Invalid votes | | 37,610 | 5.14 |
| Total votes | | 731,317 | 100.00 |
| Registered voters/turnout | | 1,611,391 | 45.38 |
Source: RNEC

=== Barranquilla (Atlántico) ===
- Population: 1,218,475 (2015 est.)
- Incumbent mayor: Elsa Noguera (CR)

==== Candidates ====
- Alejandro Char: former mayor of Barranquilla (2008–2011), former governor of Atlántico (2003)
- Rafael Sánchez Anillo: former Barranquilla municipal councillor (2012–2013)

==== Results ====
| Candidate | Party | Votes | % |
|---|---|---|---|
| Alejandro Char | Radical Change | 355,844 | 73.29 |
| Rafael Sánchez Anillo | Firme Barranquilla, sí se puede | 86,790 | 17.88 |
| Blank votes | | 42,899 | 8.84 |
| Total | | 485,533 | 100.00 |
| Valid votes | | 485,533 | 87.92 |
| Invalid votes | | 66,681 | 12.08 |
| Total votes | | 552,214 | 100.00 |
| Registered voters/turnout | | 1,009,618 | 54.70 |
Source: RNEC

=== Cartagena (Bolívar) ===
- Population: 1,001,755 (2015 est.)
- Incumbent mayor: Dionisio Vélez (Liberal–Green)

==== Candidates ====
- Manuel Duque: journalist, radio personality
- Antonio Quinto Guerra: former Cartagena municipal councillor (2003–2015)
- Andrés Betancour: former Cartagena municipal councillor (2008–2015)
- Gina Benedetti: former Ambassador of Colombia to Panama, former caretaker Mayor of Cartagena (1999–2000)

==== Results ====
| Candidate | Party | Votes | % |
|---|---|---|---|
| Manuel Duque | Primero la Gente | 127,440 | 37.53 |
| Antonio Quinta Guerra | Colombian Conservative Party | 100,358 | 29.55 |
| Andrés Betancour | Cartagena Confirma | 48,543 | 14.29 |
| Gina Benedetti | Democratic Center | 22,075 | 6.50 |
| Reinaldo Rafael Manjarrez Muñoz | Patriotic Union | 4,223 | 1.24 |
| Fabio Yezid Castellanos Herrera | Green Alliance | 3,842 | 1.13 |
| Blank vote promoting committee | Alternative Democratic Pole | 3,535 | 1.04 |
| Rosario Romero | Indigenous Authorities of Colombia | 1,633 | 0.48 |
| Blank votes | | 27,962 | 8.23 |
| Total | | 339,611 | 100.00 |
| Valid votes | | 339,611 | 89.53 |
| Invalid votes | | 39,697 | 10.47 |
| Total votes | | 379,308 | 100.00 |
| Registered voters/turnout | | 722,004 | 52.54 |
Source: RNEC
