= 2010 Colombian parliamentary election =

- 14 March 2010
- Senate
- All 102 seats in the Senate
- Turnout: 43.62%
Party	Vote %	Seats	+/–
Party of the U	25.48	28	+8
Conservative	20.59	22	+4
Liberal	15.73	17	−1
PIN	8.14	9	+9
Radical Change	7.86	8	−7
PDA	7.53	8	−2
Green Alliance	4.76	5	+5
MIRA	2.96	3	+1
Indigenous seats
ASI	14.92	1	0
AICO	13.07	1	0
This lists parties that won seats. See the complete results below.

Congressional elections were held in Colombia on 14 March 2010. The nationwide constituency for the 102-member Senate was contested by 16 lists, comprising 948 candidates. There are 33 regional constituencies for the Chamber of Representatives, plus a few other ethnic minority constituencies. In all, 282 lists, with 1,533 candidates, contested the 165 seats in the Chamber. Almost 30 million people were registered to vote.

== Results ==
=== Senate ===
Incumbent President Álvaro Uribe maintained an absolute majority of seats in the Senate. The two major parties supporting Uribe – the Party of the U and the Conservative Party – got 27 and 23 seats, respectively. The Party of the U achieved 25.17% of the votes, gaining eight seats, followed by the Conservative Party, with 20,6%, which gained four seats. The Liberals, which consists the main opposition party in the Senate, achieved 15.8% of the votes and kept its 18 seats.

The Liberal Party was followed by the National Integration Party, also allied to Uribe, was an electoral surprise, achieving 8.13% of the votes and eight seats. It became the fourth political force in the country, surpassing the Radical Change, also in the Uribe coalition, which achieved 7.97% of the votes and also eight seats, losing seven. The Alternative Democratic Pole, a more radical opposition party, lost two seats, achieving 7.62% of the votes and eight seats. The Green Party achieved five seats with 4.75% of the votes, followed by the Independent Absolute Renovation Movement with one seat and 2.7% of the votes. The Citizens Commitment for Colombia achieved 1.6% of the votes and gained no seats.

Party	Votes	%	Seats
Social Party of National Unity	2,792,944	25.48	28
Colombian Conservative Party	2,257,335	20.59	22
Colombian Liberal Party	1,724,151	15.73	17
National Integration Party	892,720	8.14	9
Radical Change	861,816	7.86	8
Alternative Democratic Pole	824,948	7.53	8
Green Party	521,503	4.76	5
Independent Movement of Absolute Renovation	324,109	2.96	3
Citizens' Compromise for Colombia	181,513	1.66	0
Liberal Opening Movement	87,009	0.79	0
Christian Party of Transformation and Order	57,981	0.53	0
Alternative for Social Advance	38,248	0.35	0
Colombian Party of Social Integration	12,348	0.11	0
Afro-Colombian Social Alliance	11,636	0.11	0
Blank votes	373,370	3.41	–
Total	10,961,631	100.00	100
Valid votes	10,961,631	84.16	
Invalid votes	2,063,718	15.84	
Total votes	13,025,349	100.00	
Registered voters/turnout	29,861,699	43.62	
Indigenous seats
Independent Social Alliance Movement	27,453	14.92	1
Indigenous Authorities of Colombia	24,045	13.07	1
Social and Indigenous Movement	21,950	11.93	0
National Integration Party	11,105	6.03	0
Alternative Democratic Pole	11,076	6.02	0
Blank votes	88,411	48.04	–
Total	184,040	100.00	2
Source: RNEC, RNEC, RNEC

==== Elected Senators ====
Senator	Party	Ref
Nerthink Mauricio Aguilar Hurtado	National Integration Party (PIN)	
Héctor Julio Alfonso López	National Integration Party (PIN)	
Hernán Francisco Andrade Serrano	Conservative Party	
Amparo Arbeláez Escalante	Liberal Party	
Samuel Benjamín Arrieta Buelvas	National Integration Party (PIN)	
Álvaro Antonio Ashton Giraldo	Liberal Party	
Luís Carlos Avellaneda Tarazona	Alternative Democratic Pole (PDA)	
Marco Aníbal Avirama	Indigenous Social Alliance Movement (ASI)	
Carlos Alberto Baena López	Independent Movement of Absolute Renovation (MIRA)	
Jorge Eliécer Ballesteros Bernier	Social Party of National Unity (U)	
Roy Leonardo Barreras Montealegre	Social Party of National Unity (U)	
Carlos Emiro Barriga Peñaranda	Conservative Party	
Armando Alberto Benedetti Villaneda	Social Party of National Unity (U)	
Musa Abraham Besayle Fayad	Social Party of National Unity (U)	
Javier Enrique Cáceres Leal	Radical Change	
Germán Bernardo Carlosama López	Indigenous Authorities of Colombia (AICO)	
Arlet Patricia Casado Fernández	Liberal Party	
Bernabé Celis Carrillo	Radical Change	
Efraín José Cepeda Sarabia	Conservative Party	
Fuad Ricardo Char Abdala	Radical Change	
Carlos Ramiro Chávarro Cuéllar	Conservative Party	
José Iván Clavijo Contreras	Conservative Party	
Piedad Esneda Córdoba Ruiz	Liberal Party	
Juan de Jesús Córdoba Suárez	Conservative Party	
Antonio José Correa Jiménez	National Integration Party (PIN)	
Juan Manuel Corzo Román	Conservative Party	
Juan Fernando Cristo Bustos	Liberal Party	
César Tulio Delgado Blandón	Conservative Party	
Édinson Delgado Ruiz	Liberal Party	
Jaime Enrique Durán Barrera	Liberal Party	
Bernardo Miguel Elías Vidal	Social Party of National Unity (U)	
Carlos Eduardo Enríquez Maya	Conservative Party	
Manuel Mesías Enríquez Rosero	Social Party of National Unity (U)	
Edgar Espíndola Niño	National Integration Party (PIN)	
Carlos Roberto Ferro Solanilla	Social Party of National Unity (U)	
Juan Manuel Galán Pachón	Liberal Party	
Honorio Galvis Aguilar	Liberal Party	
Daira de Jesús Galvis Méndez	Radical Change	
Nora María García Burgos	Conservative Party	
Guillermo García Realpe	Liberal Party	
Teresa García Romero	National Integration Party (PIN)	
Jesús Ignacio García Valencia	Liberal Party	
Jorge Eduardo Gechem Turbay	Social Party of National Unity (U)	
Roberto Víctor Gerlein Echeverría	Conservative Party	
Edgar Alfonso Gómez Román	Liberal Party	
Antonio del Cristo Guerra de la Espriella	Radical Change	
Jorge Eliécer Guevara	Alternative Democratic Pole (PDA)	
José Francisco Herrera Acosta	Radical Change	
Germán Darío Hoyos Giraldo	Social Party of National Unity (U)	
Hemel Hurtado Angulo	National Integration Party (PIN)	
Jorge Aurelio Iragorri Hormaza	Social Party of National Unity (U)	
Gilma Jiménez Gómez	Green Party	
Juan Mario Laserna Jaramillo	Conservative Party	
Oscar Mauricio Lizcano Arango	Social Party of National Unity (U)	
Jorge Eduardo Londoño Ulloa	Green Party	
Alexánder López Maya	Alternative Democratic Pole (PDA)	
Juan Francisco Lozano Ramírez	Social Party of National Unity (U)	
Maritza Martínez Aristizábal	Social Party of National Unity (U)	
Juan Samy Merheg Marún	Conservative Party	
Eduardo Carlos Merlano Morales	Social Party of National Unity (U)	
Manuel Guillermo Mora Jaramillo	Social Party of National Unity (U)	
Martín Emilio Morales Díz	Social Party of National Unity (U)	
Alexandra Moreno Piraquive	Independent Movement of Absolute Renovation (MIRA)	
Néstor Iván Moreno Rojas	Alternative Democratic Pole (PDA)	
Karime Mota y Morad	Social Party of National Unity (U)	
Carlos Fernando Motoa Solarte	Radical Change	
José David Name Cardozo	Social Party of National Unity (U)	
Iván Leonidas Name Vásquez	Green Party	
Plinio Edilberto Olano Becerra	Social Party of National Unity (U)	
Mauricio Ernesto Ospina Gómez	Alternative Democratic Pole (PDA)	
Myriam Alicia Paredes Aguirre	Conservative Party	
Jorge Hernando Pedraza Gutiérrez	Conservative Party	
Eugenio Prieto Soto	Liberal Party	
Carlos Arturo Quintero Marín	National Integration Party (PIN)	
Gloria Inés Ramírez Ríos	Alternative Democratic Pole (PDA)	
Fuad Emilio Rapag Matar	Social Party of National Unity (U)	
Liliana María Rendón Roldán	Conservative Party	
Juan Carlos Restrepo Escobar	Radical Change	
Juan Carlos Rizzetto Luces	National Integration Party (PIN)	
Jorge Enrique Robledo Castillo	Alternative Democratic Pole (PDA)	
Milton Arlex Rodríguez Sarmiento	Social Party of National Unity (U)	
Camilo Ernesto Romero Galeano	Alternative Democratic Pole (PDA)	
José Darío Salazar Cruz	Conservative Party	
Camilo Armando Sánchez Ortega	Liberal Party	
Guillermo Antonio Santos Marín	Liberal Party	
Luis Emilio Sierra Grajales	Conservative Party	
Carlos Enrique Soto Jaramillo	Social Party of National Unity (U)	
Olga Lucía Suárez Mira	Conservative Party	
John Sudarsky Rosenbaum	Green Party	
Fernando Eustacio Tamayo Tamayo	Conservative Party	
Dilian Francisca Toro Torres	Social Party of National Unity (U)	
Efraín Torrado García	Social Party of National Unity (U)	
Félix José Valera Ibáñez	Green Party	
Luís Fernando Velasco Chaves	Liberal Party	
Juan Carlos Vélez Uribe	Social Party of National Unity (U)	
Rodrigo Villalba Mosquera	Liberal Party	
Germán Villegas Villegas	Conservative Party	
Manuel Antonio Virgüez Piraquive	Independent Movement of Absolute Renovation (MIRA)	
Claudia Jeanneth Wilches Sarmiento	Social Party of National Unity (U)	
Gabriel Ignacio Zapata Correa	Conservative Party	
Piedad del Socorro Zuccardi Porras	Social Party of National Unity (U)	
Jaime Alonso Zuluaga Aristizábal	Social Party of National Unity (U)	

=== Chamber ===
Party	Votes	%	Seats
Social Party of National Unity	2,469,489	26.11	48
Colombian Conservative Party	2,027,323	21.43	36
Colombian Liberal Party	1,761,006	18.62	36
Radical Change	723,295	7.65	16
National Integration Party	703,620	7.44	11
Alternative Democratic Pole	533,729	5.64	4
Independent Movement of Absolute Renovation	332,926	3.52	1
Green Party	296,137	3.13	3
Alternative for Social Advance	185,616	1.96	1
Independent Social Alliance Movement	183,587	1.94	1
Liberal Opening Movement	102,215	1.08	2
Liberal Unity	79,507	0.84	2
Huila Option	22,794	0.24	0
Christian Party of Transformation and Order	14,612	0.15	0
National Afro-Colombian Movement	12,682	0.13	0
Regional Integration Movement	5,093	0.05	1
Social Integration Party	5,057	0.05	0
Indigenous Authorities of Colombia	601	0.01	0
Blank votes			–
Total	9,459,289	100.00	162
Afro-Colombian seats
AFROVIDES	51,160	11.98	1
United People's Movement	31,818	7.45	1
COLDEMAFRO	25,104	5.88	0
OEACOR	18,356	4.30	0
FUNDECON	17,371	4.07	0
FUNDALABOR	17,106	4.01	0
FUNAGUA	15,845	3.71	0
FISA	15,670	3.67	0
National Afro-Colombian Movement	14,410	3.37	0
ADCNPK	13,400	3.14	0
Revivir	13,235	3.10	0
ASOPRA	12,256	2.87	0
Afro-Colombian Social Alliance	10,801	2.53	0
Afro-Colombian Ethnic Community Organisation	10,080	2.36	0
FACE	7,867	1.84	0
AFRONEC	7,763	1.82	0
People's Will Movement	7,009	1.64	0
OBTALA	6,758	1.58	0
National Association of Afro-Colombian Students	6,349	1.49	0
ADCNAK	5,838	1.37	0
Los Cangrejos	5,415	1.27	0
Asociación Mision Colombia	5,324	1.25	0
AFROYUMBO	5,294	1.24	0
Afro-Colombian Ancestral Organisation	5,234	1.23	0
Fundapas Foundation	4,984	1.17	0
FUNDAIN	4,920	1.15	0
Fundación Cultural Raices Negras	4,719	1.10	0
OSCNAD	4,361	1.02	0
ADCNSAA	4,277	1.00	0
Movimiento Nacional Cimarron	3,735	0.87	0
Corporación Cimarron	3,665	0.86	0
FUNCOPACOL	3,494	0.82	0
ADCNMLK	3,454	0.81	0
CANOAS	3,452	0.81	0
ASODM	3,249	0.76	0
CORPOSINPAC	3,194	0.75	0
AKUASOMAR	2,931	0.69	0
CODECAP GVC	2,657	0.62	0
Estudiantes Palenkeros	2,652	0.62	0
AMAHY	2,496	0.58	0
CARDONAL	2,419	0.57	0
CCPL	2,367	0.55	0
Cadheubev Benkos Vive	2,283	0.53	0
Colombian Afro-Environmental Movement	2,177	0.51	0
Peaceful Coexistence Foundation	2,019	0.47	0
AAASC	1,937	0.45	0
FORFUTURO	1,911	0.45	0
AFROCAR	1,767	0.41	0
FUNDEVIA	1,745	0.41	0
FUNBARACK	1,737	0.41	0
SINFRONTERAS	1,627	0.38	0
FUNIDEA	1,570	0.37	0
CORABOSAO	1,494	0.35	0
Corporación Afroetnico	1,446	0.34	0
Asociación Civica Fuerzas Negras	1,413	0.33	0
CORMANDELA	1,297	0.30	0
AIE	1,259	0.29	0
New Life Association	1,258	0.29	0
FUNDECH	1,070	0.25	0
ASODCPRC	1,069	0.25	0
FDSDCAS	963	0.23	0
FUNDIAFRO	884	0.21	0
Fundación Semillas Sin Odio Colombia	855	0.20	0
COLOMU	830	0.19	0
Corporación Afrocolombiana Malcolm X	767	0.18	0
CCCC	690	0.16	0
La Moña	532	0.12	0
Blank votes			–
Total	427,089	100.00	2
Indigenous seat
Alternative Democratic Pole	53,680	56.76	1
Independent Social Alliance Movement	23,497	24.84	0
Indigenous Authorities of Colombia	17,404	18.40	0
Blank votes			–
Total	94,581	100.00	1
Source: RNEC, RNEC
