= List of Colombian Department Assemblies =

Department Assembly Asamblea Departamental

The party composition of Departmental Assemblies post-2019 Liberal Party Conservative Party Union Party for the People Radical Change Democratic Centre Green Alliance PHxC ASI MAIS MIRA Independent Colombia Renaciente Creemos Colombia New Liberalism Democratic Party AICO La Fuerza de la Paz Gente en Movimiento Fuerza Ciudadana En Marcha ADA Dignity and Commitment Independents MSN PDA

The Republic of Colombia is composed of 32 departments and one Capital District. Each department has a governor and an assembly composed of 11 to 31 of deputies. The capital of Bogotá has a mayor and council composed of 21 councillors. Deputies are elected by a direct vote to 4 year terms with the possibility of re-election.

== List ==
| Assembly | No. of deputies | List of deputies |
|---|---|---|
| Department Assembly of Amazonas | 11 | List |
| Department Assembly of Antioquia | 26 | List |
| Department Assembly of Arauca | 11 | List |
| Department Assembly of Atlántico | 14 | List |
| Department Assembly of Bolívar | 14 | List |
| Department Assembly of Boyacá | 16 | List |
| Department Assembly of Caldas | 14 | List |
| Department Assembly of Caquetá | 11 | List |
| Department Assembly of Casanare | 11 | List |
| Department Assembly of Cauca | 13 | List |
| Department Assembly of Cesar | 11 | List |
| Department Assembly of Chocó | 11 | List |
| Department Assembly of Córdoba | 13 | List |
| Department Assembly of Cundinamarca | 16 | List |
| Council of Bogotá | 45 | List |
| Department Assembly of La Guajira | 11 | List |
| Department Assembly of Guainía | 11 | List |
| Department Assembly of Guaviare | 11 | List |
| Department Assembly of Huila | 12 | List |
| Department Assembly of Magdalena | 13 | List |
| Department Assembly of Meta | 11 | List |
| Department Assembly of Nariño | 14 | List |
| Department Assembly of Norte de Santander | 13 | List |
| Department Assembly of Putumayo | 11 | List |
| Department Assembly of Quindío | 11 | List |
| Department Assembly of Risaralda | 12 | List |
| Department Assembly of San Andrés and Providencia | 11 | List |
| Department Assembly of Santander | 16 | List |
| Department Assembly of Sucre | 11 | List |
| Department Assembly of Tolima | 15 | List |
| Department Assembly of Valle del Cauca | 21 | List |
| Department Assembly of Vaupés | 11 | List |
| Department Assembly of Vichada | 11 | List |

== See also ==
- Legislative Branch of Colombia
- List of Colombian department governors
