= 2014 Colombian parliamentary election =

- 9 March 2014
- Chamber of Representatives
- All 166 seats in the Chamber of Representatives
- Turnout: 42.99% (▼0.63pp)
Party	Vote %	Seats	+/–
Party of the U	19.68	38	−10
Liberal	17.25	39	+3
Conservative	16.06	27	−9
Democratic Centre	11.66	19	New
Radical Change	9.47	16	0
Greens	4.07	6	+3
OC	3.97	6	−5
PDA	3.49	3	−1
MIRA	3.47	3	+2
100% for Colombia	1.37	3	New
For a Better Huila	0.62	1	New
AICO	0.54	2	+2
MIR	0.04	1	0
Afro-Caribbean seats
FUNECO	25.46	2	New
Indigenous seat
AICO	25.03	1	+1
This lists parties that won seats. See the complete results below.
- Senate
- All 102 seats in the Senate
Party	Vote %	Seats	+/–
Party of the U	19.12	21	−7
Democratic Centre	17.81	20	New
Conservative	16.63	18	−4
Liberal	14.91	17	0
Radical Change	8.49	9	+1
Greens	4.78	5	0
PDA	4.56	5	−3
OC	4.50	5	−4
Indigenous seats
MAIS	15.40	1	New
ASI	11.30	1	0
This lists parties that won seats. See the complete results below.
Results of the election in the House of Representatives and Senate (bottom left).

Congressional elections were held in Colombia on 9 March 2014 to elect members to both chambers of Congress. The nationwide constituency for the 102-member Senate was contested, as well as the 166 seats of the House of Representatives, plus the delegates to the Andean Parliament. There were 773 candidates for the Senate, 1,528 candidates for the House of Representatives, and 23 candidates for the five Colombian seats in the Andean Parliament. 32,795,962 Colombians had been registered to vote in the elections by the cut-off date of 25 January 2014.

The elections were notable for the decision by former president Álvaro Uribe to stand for the Senate, the first ex-president in modern Colombian history to run for Congress afterwards. Uribe is constitutionally barred from standing for president again, having already served two terms.

== Electoral system ==
Both senators and representatives are elected to four-year terms however the electoral system differs. The electoral system used for the Senate is a one national constituency to elect 100 members by proportional representation whilst the remaining 2 Senators are reserved for Indigenous Colombians, who have a separate ballot. The House of Representatives uses proportional representation with the departments serving as constituencies, each electing from between 2 and 18 members.

== Opinion polls ==
Date	Pollster	Sample size	PLC	La U	CD	PCC	PDA	CR	OC	AV	MIRA	Others	None/Don't know	Margin of error
2010 elections			17.8%	25.9	–	21.3	6.9	8.0	7.9	4.0	2.9	–	–	–
12–19 Oct 2013	Cifras y Conceptos	2500	15%	13%	17%	5%	5%	2%	n.a.	5%	2%	2%	33%	2.9%
22–27 Nov 2013	Cifras y Conceptos	2500	17%	11%	15%	6%	4%	2%	n.a.	5%	1%	n.a.	36%	2.9%
29–31 Jan 2014	Datexco/El Tiempo & W Radio	1200	12.2%	18.2%	10.4%	8.8%	6.0%	4.9%	0.5%	5.4%	2.9%	2.8%	26.8%	2.8%
20–24 Feb 2014	Cifras y Conceptos	2500	17%	11%	20%	8%	6%	5%	3%	6%	5%	n.a.	20%	2.9%
25–28 Feb 2014	Datexco/El Tiempo & W Radio	1200	13.6%	13.4%	23.4%	7.3%	10.0%	5.1%	1.1%	4.3%	2.2%	0.2%	19.4%	2.8%

== Results ==
=== Senate ===
Party	Votes	%	Seats	+/–
Social Party of National Unity	2,268,911	19.12	21	–7
Democratic Center	2,113,347	17.81	20	New
Colombian Conservative Party	1,973,009	16.63	18	–4
Colombian Liberal Party	1,768,825	14.91	17	0
Radical Change	1,006,260	8.48	9	+1
Green Party	567,102	4.78	5	0
Alternative Democratic Pole	540,709	4.56	5	–3
Citizen Option	534,250	4.50	5	–4
Independent Movement of Absolute Renovation	334,836	2.82	0	–3
Blank votes	757,907	6.39	–	–
Total	11,865,156	100.00	100	0
Valid votes	11,865,156	83.69		
Invalid votes	2,312,742	16.31		
Total votes	14,177,898	100.00		
Registered voters/turnout	32,803,324	43.22		
Indigenous seats
Indigenous and Social Alternative Movement	48,928	15.40	1	New
Independent Social Alliance Movement	35,906	11.30	1	0
Indigenous Authorities of Colombia	31,094	9.79	0	–1
Organisation of Indigenous Peoples of the Colombian Amazon	15,041	4.73	0	New
Cabildo del Resguardo de Calderas	9,419	2.96	0	New
Multi-Ethnic Colombia	7,057	2.22	0	New
National Indigenous Association of Colombia	6,386	2.01	0	New
Ethnic Renewal of Colombia	5,963	1.88	0	New
Indigenous Council of San Sebastian de los Lagos	4,078	1.28	0	New
Indigenous Community of Barrancon	3,901	1.23	0	New
Yanacona Indigenous Corporation	3,246	1.02	0	New
Association of Traditional Indigenous Authorities	3,163	1.00	0	New
Association of Traditional Authorities and Indigenous Councils	2,067	0.65	0	New
Indigenous Agricultural Pride	1,881	0.59	0	New
Blank votes	139,547	43.93	–	–
Total	317,677	100.00	2	0
Source: RNEC

=== Chamber of Representatives ===
Party	Votes	%	Seats	+/–
Social Party of National Unity	2,334,250	19.68	37	–11
Colombian Liberal Party	2,046,668	17.25	39	+3
Colombian Conservative Party	1,904,887	16.06	27	–9
Democratic Center	1,383,830	11.66	19	New
Radical Change	1,122,965	9.47	16	0
Green Party	483,407	4.07	6	+3
Citizen Option	471,072	3.97	6	–5
Alternative Democratic Pole	413,707	3.49	3	–1
Independent Movement of Absolute Renovation	411,400	3.47	3	+2
100% for Colombia	162,256	1.37	3	New
Patriotic Union	99,082	0.84	0	New
For a Better Huila	73,228	0.62	1	New
Indigenous Authorities of Colombia	63,929	0.54	2	+2
Independent Social Alliance Movement	47,374	0.40	0	–1
Regional Integration Movement	4,445	0.04	1	0
White for Peace	574	0.00	0	New
Inclusion and Opportunities Movement	347	0.00	0	New
Democratic Center Firm Hand Big Heart	311	0.00	0	New
Blank votes	840,141	7.08	–	–
Total	11,863,873	100.00	163	0
Valid votes	11,863,873	84.14		
Invalid votes	2,237,003	15.86		
Total votes	14,100,876	100.00		
Registered voters/turnout	32,803,324	42.99		
Afro-Colombian seats
FUNECO	62,004	25.46	2	New
Inclusion and Opportunities Movement	20,712	8.51	0	New
Citizen Power Corporation	13,910	5.71	0	New
ASOCONEGUA	7,236	2.97	0	New
ASOPRA	6,660	2.74	0	0
ASODEPORTES	6,584	2.70	0	New
AFROVIDES	6,319	2.60	0	–1
Fundación Esperanza Afro Esafro	5,777	2.37	0	New
Afro-Colombian Ethnic Community Organisation	3,293	1.35	0	0
AFROMINGA	3,240	1.33	0	New
Fundación Forfuturo	3,052	1.25	0	0
CORPOSINPAC	2,714	1.11	0	0
Afro-Colombians in Action Foundation	2,013	0.83	0	New
Unete	2,010	0.83	0	New
Los Palenkes-Bellavista-Ch	1,937	0.80	0	New
CCCSAEC	1,789	0.73	0	New
FUNDAIN	1,706	0.70	0	0
Yes You Can	1,539	0.63	0	New
FUNCULCOSTA	1,539	0.63	0	New
MASM	1,509	0.62	0	New
Nelson Mandela Corporation	1,457	0.60	0	New
EATBCVC	1,455	0.60	0	New
AFRODMAM	1,442	0.59	0	New
FUNPROESAT	1,330	0.55	0	New
FDCPC	1,270	0.52	0	New
Afro-Ethnics Corporation	968	0.40	0	New
FDSICNC	944	0.39	0	New
Corporacion Vides y sus Niches	809	0.33	0	New
FUNDIAFRO	705	0.29	0	0
Blank votes	77,572	31.86	–	–
Total	243,495	100.00	2	0
Indigenous seats
Indigenous Authorities of Colombia	28,361	25.03	1	+1
Indigenous and Social Alternative Movement	21,534	19.01	0	New
MUIPC	13,655	12.05	0	New
Ethnic Renewal of Colombia	4,400	3.88	0	New
Association of Traditional Indigenous Authorities	2,870	2.53	0	New
Association of Traditional Authorities and Indigenous Councils	2,478	2.19	0	New
ECRIDAD	1,428	1.26	0	New
New Way	1,413	1.25	0	New
AIMAC	1,411	1.25	0	New
Blank votes	35,756	31.56	–	–
Total	113,306	100.00	1	0
Source: RNEC, Barrero et al.

== See also ==
- National Electoral Council
