= Liberalism in Colombia =

This article gives an overview of liberalism in Colombia. It is limited to liberal parties with substantial support, mainly demonstrated by having had representation in parliament. The sign ⇒ means a reference to another party in the scheme. For inclusion in this scheme, it is not necessary for the parties to have identified themselves as liberals.

== Introduction ==
Liberalism in Colombia is organized in opposition to conservatism. The Colombian Liberal Party, founded in 1849, still exists as a dominant party, usually achieving the largest voter turnouts and electoral victories in congress and regional elections. It has also been a strong contender in recent presidential elections. It joined the Socialist International, despite historically being considered a party slightly left of center and somewhat prone to populism, according to some critics.

Its traditional position can be considered somewhere between liberalism and social democracy. Several current leaders of the party in the late 20th and early 21st centuries claim to be seeking to move the party closer to the social democratic left.

== The timeline ==
=== Colombian Liberal Party ===
- 1849: The Colombian Liberal Party (Partido Liberal Colombiano) is founded.
- 1960: Dissident liberals formed the ⇒ Revolutionary Liberal Movement.
- 1967/1968: Most of the movement returned to the party.
- 1979: Dissident liberals formed ⇒ New Liberalism. Nuevo liberalismo.
- 1981: Dissident liberals formed ⇒ People's Power.

=== Liberal Revolutionary Movement ===
- 1960: A dissident faction of the ⇒ Colombian Liberal Party formed the Liberal Revolutionary Movement (Movimiento Revolucionario Liberal) (MRL).
- 1967: Most of the party returned to the ⇒ Colombian Liberal Party.
- 1968: The party disappeared.

=== People's Power ===
- 1981: A dissident faction of the ⇒ Colombian Liberal Party formed People's Power (Poder Popular).
- 1990s: The party returns to the ⇒ Colombian Liberal Party.

=== New Liberalism ===
- 1979: A dissident faction of the ⇒ Colombian Liberal Party formed New Liberalism (Nuevo Liberalismo).
- 1987: Most of the party and its leaders returned to the ⇒ Colombian Liberal Party.
- 1989: Luis Carlos Galán assassinated.
- 1990s: The party disappeared.
- 2021: The party was refounded.

=== Uribism ===
- 1990s: Many small liberal regional movements were formed as dissident factions of the main Liberal Party, including the Independent Civic Movement, LIDER Movement, New Colombia Movement, Liberal Oxygen Movement, Civic Popular Convergence, Let’s Go Colombia, 98 Movement, Colombia My Country, Democratic Reconstruction Movement, Colombian Popular Party, and the Citizen’s Movement.
- 2002: Some regional dissident factions return to the main Liberal Party. Other factions regrouped into new political movements, most of them associated with the dissident liberal president Álvaro Uribe. These included ALAS, United Popular Movement, National Progressist Movement, MORAL, MIPOL, Citizen’s Convergence, Let’s Go Colombia, Civic Popular Convergence, Radical Change Party, We Are Colombia, Colombia Always, New Liberalism, Popular Will, the Independent Civic Movement, and the Social Security Movement.
- 2003: A political reform allowed parliamentarians to reorganize. The main Liberal Party went into opposition to Uribe’s government, while all pro-Uribe liberals left to join other parties. The New Party (Nuevo Partido) was created to unite all pro-Uribe liberals; however, not all joined, with some opting for the Radical Change Party. Most of the previous liberal factions consolidated into three parties: the Democratic Colombia Party, Living Colombia Movement, and Citizen’s Convergence Party.
- 2006: The New Party, together with some Liberal Party members, some from Radical Change, various minor liberal and independent movements, and a small group of conservatives, formed the Social National Unity Party, better known as the Party of the U, which became the largest party in Colombia. The Radical Change Party expanded through mergers with independent liberal and Christian movements. Three small liberal parties continued with representation: the Democratic Colombia Party, Living Colombia Movement, and Citizen’s Convergence Party.
- 2010: Half of the parliamentarians from the Radical Change Party switched to the Party of the U. The three small liberal movements, the Democratic Colombia Party, Living Colombia Movement, and Citizen’s Convergence Party, united to form the National Integration Party (PIN).

== Liberal leaders ==
- Partido Liberal: Jorge Eliécer Gaitán - Alfonso López Michelsen - Luis Carlos Galán - César Gaviria

== See also ==
- History of Colombia
- Politics of Colombia
- List of political parties in Colombia
