= Luis Eduardo Díazgranados =

Colombian lawyer and politician

Honorable Senator Luis Eduardo Díazgranados

Senator of Colombia
- In office July 20, 2018 – July 20, 2022

Member of the Chamber of Representatives of Colombia
- In office July 20, 2010 – July 20, 2018
- Constituency: Atlántico

Personal details
- Born: Luis Eduardo Díazgranados Torres; July 15, 1970 (age 56) Barranquilla, Colombia
- Party: Radical Change
- Education: Mercer University
- Occupation: Businessman and politician

Luis Eduardo Díazgranados Torres (born 15 July 1970 in Barranquilla, Columbia) is a Colombian businessman and politician.

== Biography ==
He was born in Barranquilla on 15 July 1970. He studied business administration at Mercer University in the United States. His career began as manager of Utraplast in the livestock sector.

He began his political career as a councilor of Barranquilla from 2001 to 2003, and then as a deputy of the Atlántico Department from 2004 to 2007. In 2010, he was elected as a Member of the Chamber of Representatives of Colombia and re-elected in 2014. He later served as a Senator of Colombia from 2018 to 2022 for the Radical Change party.
