= 1939 Colombian parliamentary election =

Congresisonal elections were held in Colombia in February 1939 to elect the Chamber of Representatives. The Liberal Party received the most votes.

== Results ==
=== Chamber of Representatives ===
Party	Votes	%	Seats
Colombian Liberal Party	592,283	64.41	79
Colombian Conservative Party	322,825	35.11	39
Other parties	4,461	0.49	0
Total	919,569	100.00	118
Registered voters/turnout	1,812,636	–	
Source: Nohlen, Abente et al.

=== Senate ===
Party	Seats
Colombian Liberal Party	35
Colombian Conservative Party	21
Total	56
Source: Abente et al.
