= Social Action Party (Colombia) =

Political party in Colombia

The Social Action Party (Partido de Acción Social) was a political party in Colombia. In the 2006 Colombian Parliamentary Elections, they won one seat in the Chamber of Representatives, with 0.60% of the vote. The party has not run in any elections, regional or national, since the 2006 election. As of 2024, they are not a registered political party in Colombia.

The leaders of the party have moved into an NGO, advocating for the preservation of water resources.
