= Progressive Force =

Political party in Colombia

The Progressive Force (Spanish: Fuerza Progresista, FP), also known as Progressive Force of Courage (Fuerza Progresista del Coraje), was a conservative political party in Colombia led by Fabio Valencia Cossio.

== History ==
The party first contested national elections in 1991, when it ran in the October 1991 parliamentary elections, winning one seat in the Senate, taken by Fabio Valencia Cossio.

In the 1994 parliamentary elections the party won four seats in the Chamber of Representatives, with Benjamin Higuita Rivera, Jorge Humberto Tejada Neira and Luis Norberto Guerra Vélez elected in Antioquia. In the Senate elections, Valencia Cossio running on a joint FP–Conservative Party ticket received the second highest personal vote in the country.

The party retained all four seats in the 1998 parliamentary elections, with Cossio again the second-highest vote winner in the Senate elections. In the 2002 parliamentary elections it won a seat in the Senate, but was reduced to two seats in the Chamber.

In the 2006 parliamentary elections the party received just 40 votes in the Senate election and lost its parliamentary representation.
