= Republican Movement (Colombia) =

Political party in Colombia

The Republican Movement (Movimiento Republicano) was a political party in Colombia. It was a temporary splinter from the Colombian Conservative Party.

At the 2002 Colombian parliamentary election, the party elected one member, Juan Martin Hoyos Villegas, to the Chamber of Representatives, the same result it obtained in the 1998 Colombian parliamentary election. It is currently not registered as an active political party.
