= National Integration Party =

National Integration Party (Partido de Integración Nacional) can refer to:

- National Integration Party (Colombia)
- National Integration Party (Costa Rica)
- National Integration Party (Guatemala)
- National Integration Party (Peru)
