= Juan Sebastián Romero Leal =

Colombian politician and LGBT activist

Juan Sebastián Romero
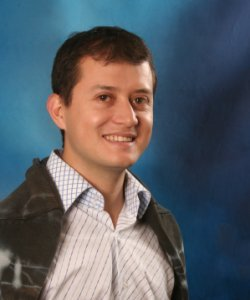
- Born: Juan Sebastián Romero Leal; 30 July 1978; Bogotá, Colombia
- Died: 28 February 2011 (aged 32); Bogotá, Colombia
- Education: National University of Colombia
- Occupations: Politician, LGBT activist
- Political party: Alternative Democratic Pole

Juan Sebastián Romero Leal (30 July 1978 – 28 February 2011) was a Colombian politician and LGBT activist. A member of the Alternative Democratic Pole, he was elected to the Local Administrative Board (Junta Administradora Local) of Chapinero, Bogotá. He is the only openly homosexual politician to have won a seat in the most recent Bogotá local elections.

== Early life and education ==
Romero was born in Bogotá on 30 July 1978. He studied biology at the National University of Colombia.

== Political career and activism ==
Romero was a founding member of Polo de Rosa, an LGBT current within the Alternative Democratic Pole. A 2016 English-language report by the LGBTQ+ Victory Institute identified him as one of the leading figures associated with the group.

In the 2007 Bogotá local elections, he won a seat on the Chapinero Local Administrative Board with 1,060 votes. His candidacy and election drew national attention because he campaigned openly as a gay politician.

Romero died in Bogotá on 28 February 2011.

== Legacy ==
A district LGBTI community house in Teusaquillo, Bogotá, is named Sebastián Romero.
