= People's Participation Movement =

Political party in Colombia

The People's Participation Movement (Movimiento de Participación Popular) was a political party in Colombia. It was created on July 3, 1997.

At the 1998 Colombian parliamentary election, the party elected one member to the Chamber of Representatives, Alonso Rafael Acosta Osio. At the 2002 Colombian parliamentary election, the party won parliamentary representation as one of the many small parties. In the following legislative elections of 2006, the party won 1 out of 166 Deputies and no senators. It is currently not registered as an active political party.
