= Juan Manuel Corzo =

Colombian lawyer and politician

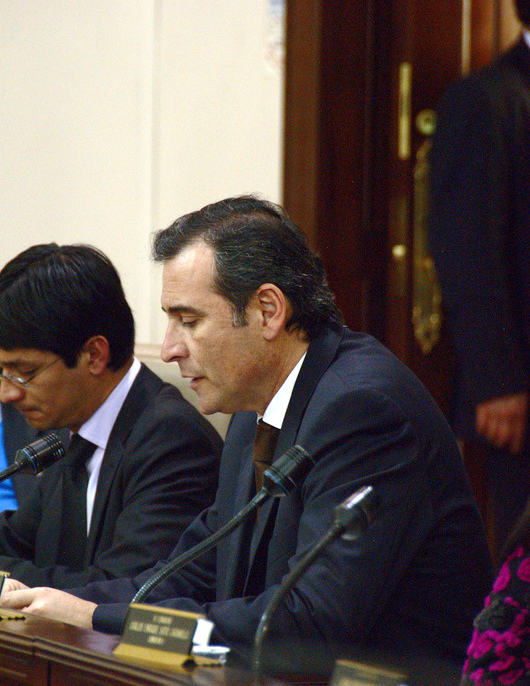
- Senator Corzo in 2011.

President of the Senate
- In office 20 July 2011 – 20 July 2012
- Preceded by: Armando Benedetti
- Succeeded by: Roy Barreras

Senator of Colombia
- In office 20 July 2002 – 7 August 2026

Member of the Chamber of Representatives
- In office 20 July 1998 – 20 July 2002
- Constituency: North Santander

Personal details
- Born: Juan Manuel Corzo Román; 3 October 1961 (age 64) Cúcuta, North Santander, Colombia
- Party: Conservative (2006–present)
- Other political affiliations: National Movement (1998–2006)
- Spouse: Isabel Carmenza Sanmiguel Maldonado
- Children: Silvia Corzo Sanmiguel; Luis Javier Corzo Sanmiguel
- Education: Saint Thomas Aquinas University (LLB, 1986)
- Profession: Lawyer
- Website: www.senadorjuanmanuelcorzo.com

Juan Manuel Corzo Román (born 3 October 1961) is a Colombian lawyer and politician, currently serving as Senator of Colombia since 2002. A Conservative party politician, he was first elected to Congress as Representative for the Department of North Santander in 1998. He ran and was elected Senator of Colombia in 2002, continuing to be re-elected in 2006 and 2010; he forms part of the First Commission of the Senate.

On 12 April 1999 Corzo was kidnapped along with the 39 other passengers of an Avianca Fokker flight between Bucaramanga and Cúcuta by a command of the National Liberation Army (ELN), a leftist terrorist guerrilla group, and was held captive for 17 months until his release in September 2000.

== Personal life ==
Juan Manuel was born on 3 October 1961 in Cúcuta to Luis Corzo Ramírez, a lawyer and notary, and his wife Lucila Román. He is married to Isabel Carmenza Sanmiguel Maldonado, a former Miss North Santander, and together have two children: Silvia and Luis Javier.

== See also ==
- List of solved missing person cases: 1950–1999
