= Eduardo Enríquez Maya =

Colombian politician (1948–2021)

Member of the Senate of Colombia
- In office 20 July 2006 – 14 April 2021

Member of the Chamber of Representatives of Colombia
- In office 20 July 1998 – 20 July 2006
- Constituency: Nariño

Personal details
- Born: 11 October 1948 Iles, Colombia
- Died: 14 April 2021 (aged 72) Bogotá, Colombia
- Party: PCC

Eduardo Enríquez Maya (11 October 1948 – 14 April 2021) was a Colombian politician.

== Biography ==
A member of the Colombian Conservative Party, he served in the Chamber of Representatives of Colombia from 1998 to 2006 and the Senate of Colombia from 2006 until his death from COVID-19 in Bogotá on 14 April 2021 at the age of 72.
