= Gabriel Acosta Bendek =

Colombian politician

- Born: 18 June 1931; Sitionuevo, Magdalena, Colombia
- Died: 10 August 2014 (aged 83); Barranquilla, Colombia
- Occupation: Politician
- Political party: National Conservative Movement (1998–2002); Movimiento Nacional (2002–2006); Citizens' Convergence (2006–2010)

Gabriel Acosta Bendek (18 June 1931 – 10 August 2014) was a Colombian physician and politician. He served as member of the Senate of Colombia during three terms, from 1994 to 2010. He was affiliated to the National Conservative Movement (1998–2002), the Movimiento Nacional (2002–06) and the Citizens' Convergence (2006–10).
