= Roberto Gerlein =

Senator of Colombia

Roberto Gerlein Echeverría
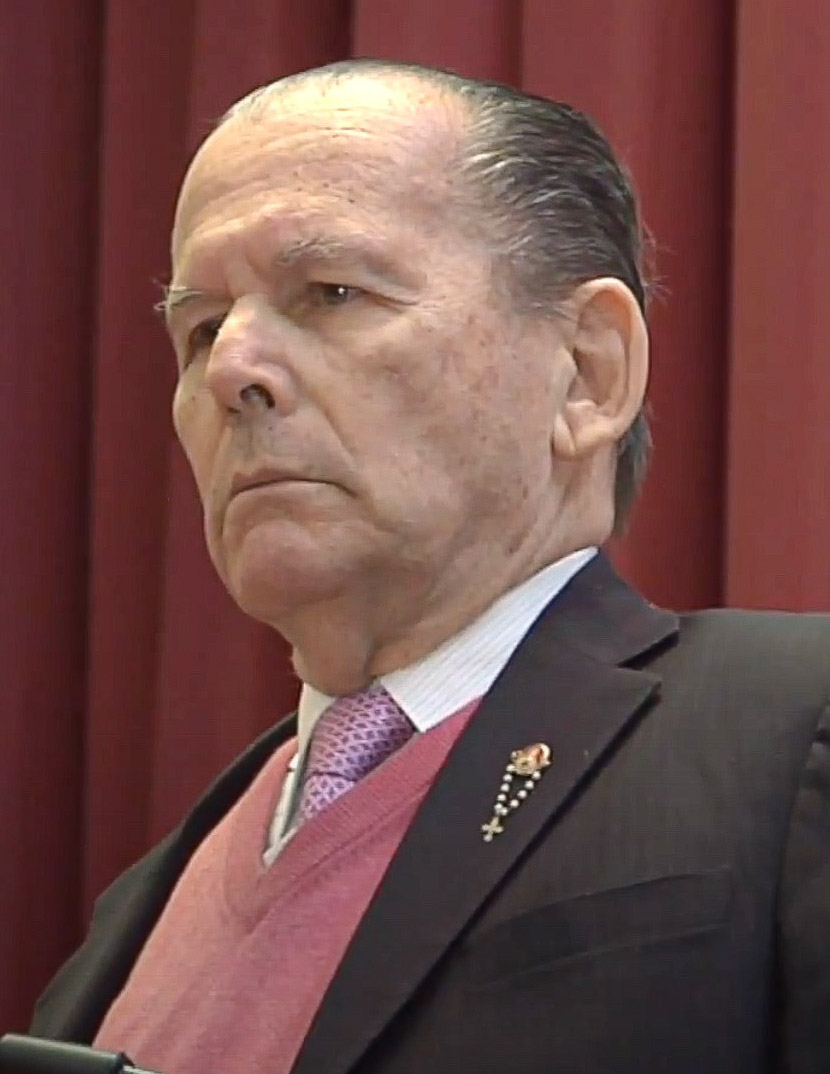

Senator of Colombia
- In office 20 July 1976 – 20 July 2018

10th Minister of Economic Development of Colombia
- In office 7 August 1982 – 1983
- President: Belisario Betancur Cuartas
- Preceded by: Gabriel Melo Guevara
- Succeeded by: Rodrigo Marín Bernal

42nd Governor of Atlántico
- In office 1974–1975
- President: Alfonso López Michelsen
- Preceded by: José Tcherassi Guzmán
- Succeeded by: Rafael Maldonado de Castro

Member of the Chamber of Representatives of Colombia
- In office 20 July 1968 – 20 July 1974
- Constituency: Atlántico

Personal details
- Born: Roberto Víctor Gerlein Echeverría; 18 November 1938 Barranquilla, Atlántico, Colombia
- Died: 23 December 2021 (aged 83) Barranquilla, Atlántico, Colombia
- Party: Conservative (after 2006)
- Other political affiliations: National Movement (1998–2006)
- Spouse: Lydia DaMarco Besada (m. 1964)
- Relations: Jorge Alberto Gerlein Echeverría (brother)
- Children: María Alexandra Gerlein DaMarco
- Education: Pontifical Xavierian University (LLB, LLD)

Roberto Víctor Gerlein Echeverría (18 November 1938 – 23 December 2021) was a Colombian lawyer and politician. A Conservative party politician, he was the longest-serving and most senior Member of the Senate of Colombia having been first elected in 1974. During his long political career, he served also as a Member of the Chamber of Representatives (1968–1974), as the 10th Colombian Minister of Economic Development, and as the 42nd Governor of Atlántico. He died in Barranquilla on 23 December 2021, at the age of 83.

== Selected works ==
- Roberto, Gerlein Echeverría (1963). Apuntes Sobre el Juicio Ejecutivo (Thesis) (in Spanish). Bogotá: Editorial Minerva. OCLC 183904558.
- Roberto, Gerlein Echeverría (1978). La Estructura del Poder en Colombia (Non-fiction) (in Spanish). Bogotá: Ediciones Tercer Mundo. OCLC 4575227.

== See also ==
- Fuad Ricardo Char Abdala
- José Name Terán
