= For the Country of Our Dreams =

Political party in Colombia

For the Country of Our Dreams (Por el País que soñamos) is a political party in Colombia. The party took part in the parliamentary elections of 2006, in which they won 2 out of 166 deputies and no senators.

Simón Gaviria Muñoz was elected as a deputy under the party banner.
