= Civic Purpose Colombia =

Political party in Colombia

The Civic Purpose Colombia (Cívico Seriedad Colombia) is a political party in Colombia. In the 2002 legislative elections, that party won, as one of the many small parties in parliamentary representation.
