= New Huila and Liberalism =

Political party in Colombia

The Huila New and Liberalism (Huila Nueva y Liberalismo) is a regional political party in Colombia, closely affiliated to the Liberal Party of Colombia. In the 2006 legislative elections on the 12th of March, the party won 2 seats in the Chamber of Representatives.
