= Progressive National Movement =

Political party in Colombia

The Progressive National Movement (Movimiento Nacional Progresista) is a progressive political party in Colombia. In the 2002 legislative elections, the party won, as one of the many small parties, parliamentary representation. The party took part in the parliamentary elections of 2006, in which it won 1 out of 166 deputies and no senators. The party was of little significance in the 2010 elections.
