= Independent Conservatism =

Colombian political party

Independent Conservatism (Conservatismo Independiente) was a conservative political party in Colombia. In the 2002 legislative election, the party won parliamentary representation as one of the many small parties. In the election of 2006, the party won no seats.
