= United People's Movement (Colombia) =

The United People's Movement (Movimiento Popular Unido) was a liberal political party in Colombia. In the 2002 legislative elections on March 10, 2002, the party won, as one of the many small parties, parliamentary representation. In the simultaneous legislative elections of 2006, the party won 2 out of 166 deputies and no senators.
