= Colombia Unite =

Political party in Colombia

Colombia Unite (Únete Colombia) is a political party in Colombia. In the 2002 legislative elections, the party won, as one of the many small parties, parliamentary representation. In the election of 2006, the party won no seats.
