= Office of the Auditor General of Colombia =

Agency of the Government of Colombia

Office of the Auditor General of the Republic
- Auditoría General de la República

Agency overview
- Formed: June 29, 1999
- Type: Control
- Headquarters: Cra. 10 № 17-18, Piso 9 Edificio Colseguros; Bogotá, D.C., Colombia
- Annual budget: COP$16,062,429,892 (est. 2010)
- Agency executives: Iván Darío Gómez Lee, Auditor General; Ana María Echeverry Álvarez, Auxiliary Auditor
- Parent agency: Office of the Inspector General of Colombia
- Key document: Decreto 1142 De 1999
- Website: www.auditoria.gov.co

The Office of the Auditor General of Colombia (Spanish: Auditoría General de la República) is an autonomous organ of the state, and its auditor of the Government of Colombia directly subordinate of the Office of the Inspector General of Colombia.
