= Community Participation =

Political party in Colombia

Community Participation (Participación Comunidad) is a progressive political party in Colombia. In the 2002 legislative elections, the party received 53,312 votes and won one seat. In the election of 2006, the party won no seats.
