= Clara López =

Colombian politician (born 1950)

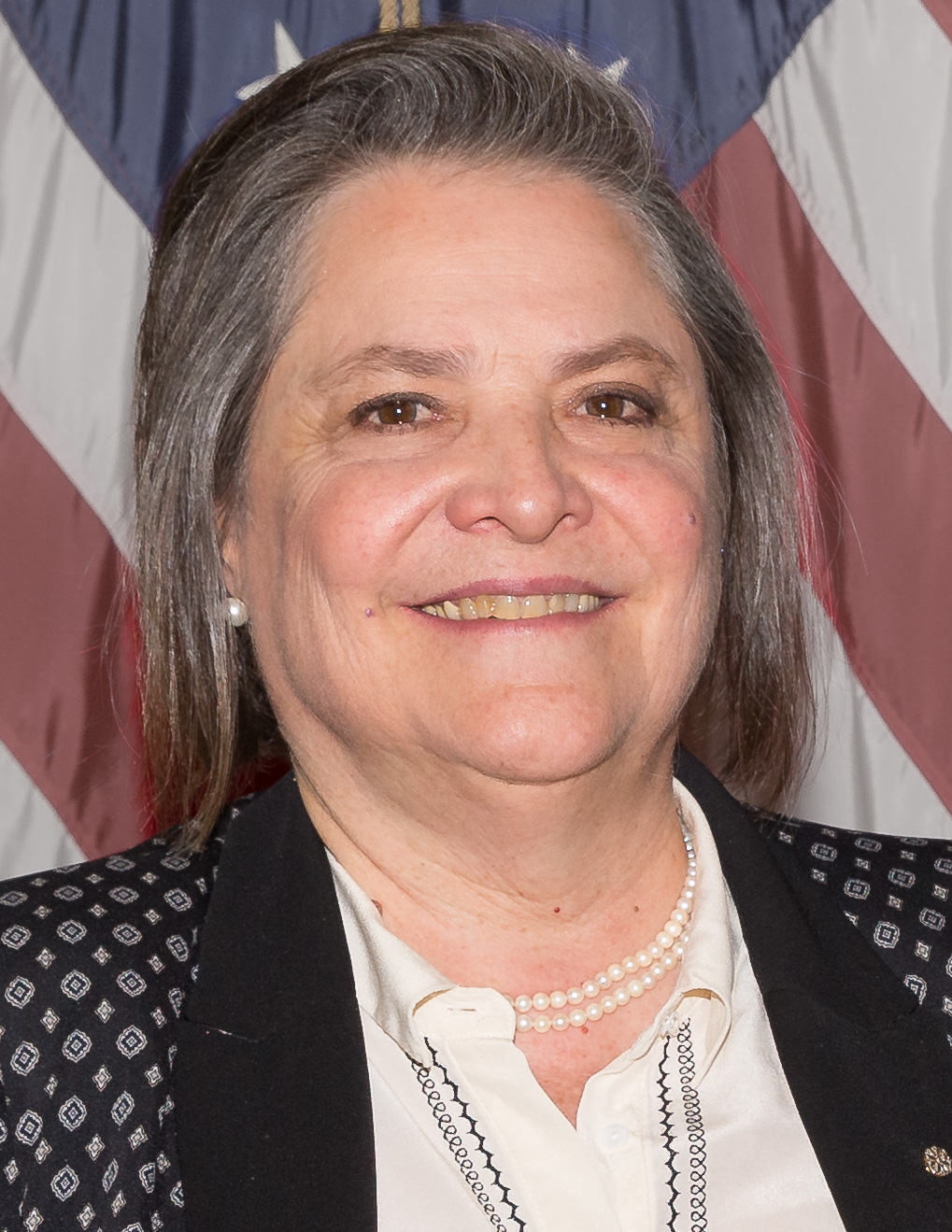
- López in 2016

Minister of Labour
- In office 25 April 2016 – 5 May 2017
- President: Juan Manuel Santos
- Preceded by: Luis Eduardo Garzón
- Succeeded by: Griselda Restrepo

Acting Mayor of Bogotá
- In office 8 June 2011 – 1 January 2012
- Appointed by: Juan Manuel Santos
- Preceded by: Samuel Moreno
- Succeeded by: Gustavo Petro

Secretary of Government of Bogotá
- In office 1 January 2008 – 10 March 2010
- Mayor: Samuel Moreno
- Preceded by: Juan Manuel Ospina
- Succeeded by: Andrés Restrepo

6th Auditor General of Colombia
- In office 1 April 2003 – 1 April 2005
- Nominated by: Supreme Court of Justice
- Appointed by: Council of State
- Preceded by: César Augusto López
- Succeeded by: Piedad Zúñiga

Personal details
- Born: Clara Eugenia López Obregón; 12 April 1950 (age 76) Bogotá, D.C., Colombia
- Citizenship: Colombia • Palestine
- Party: Historic Pact (2025—present)
- Other political affiliations: New Liberalism (1984–1987); Patriotic Union (1987–2005); Alternative Democratic Pole (2005-2025); Historic Pact for Colombia (2022-2025)
- Spouse: Jacques Courtois (m. 1980; div. 1983) Carlos Arturo Romero (m. 1985; died 2019)
- Education: Harvard University (A.B., 1972); University of the Andes (LLB, 1996); University of Salamanca (LLD, 2002)
- Profession: Economist; lawyer

Clara Eugenia López Obregón (born 12 April 1950) is a Colombian politician who was the Minister for Employment. She also served as Acting Mayor of Bogotá from 2011 to 2012. A Harvard-trained economist, she was the Alternative Democratic Pole's nominee for President of Colombia in the 2014 election.

López is also a University of Los Andes-trained lawyer with a doctorate from the University of Salamanca, and served as the sixth Auditor General of Colombia from 2003 to 2005.

== Personal life ==
López was born on 12 April 1950 in Bogotá, Colombia to Álvaro López Holguín (grandson of Alfonso López Pumarejo) and Cecilia Obregón Rocha. (cousin of painter Alejandro Obregón Roses) She attended Colegio Nueva Granada in Bogotá, but was later sent to live in McLean, Virginia in the United States, where she attended the Madeira School, a prestigious preparatory boarding school for girls. After graduating high school in 1968, she attended Harvard University where she became an active participant in the student movement opposed to United States involvement in the Vietnam War. She graduated with an A.B. magna cum laude in June 1972.

She was married on 13 September 1980 in Tenjo, Cundinamarca to Edmond Jacques Courtois Miller, a wealthy Canadian banker whom she met while in Harvard, but they later divorced after Courtois was charged and pleaded guilty to insider trading charges in New York in 1983, having peddled confidential takeover information while a vice president at Morgan Stanley's mergers and acquisitions department from 1974 to 1977. She later remarried to Carlos Romero Jiménez, whom she met while they both served in the Bogotá City Council. She has no children.
