= National Democratic Reconstruction =

Political party in Colombia

The National Democratic Reconstruction (Reconstrucción Democrática Nacional) is a political party in Colombia.

At the legislative elections on 10 March 2002, the party won parliamentary representation as one of the many small parties. In the election of 2006, the party won no seats.
