= Manuel Enríquez Rosero =

Colombian politician (born 1958)

Manuel Mesías Enríquez Rosero
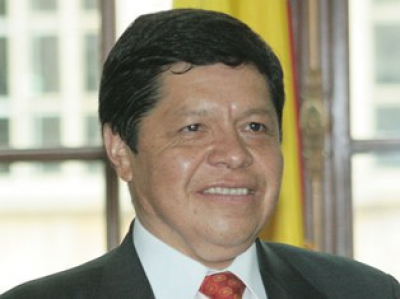
- Manuel Enríquez Rosero

Senator of Colombia
- Incumbent
- Assumed office 20 July 2006

Member of the Chamber of Representatives of Colombia
- In office 20 July 2004 – 20 July 2006
- Constituency: Nariño Department
- In office 20 July 2002 – 1 March 2004
- Constituency: Nariño Department

Personal details
- Born: 24 December 1958 (age 67) Cumbal, Nariño, Colombia
- Party: Social Party of National Unity
- Other political affiliations: Civic People's Convergence
- Education: Free University of Colombia (LLB); Pontifical Xavierian University (MIA, MPs)
- Profession: Lawyer
- Website: www.manuelenriquezrosero.com

Manuel Mesías Enríquez Rosero (born 24 December 1958) is a Senator of Colombia. A lawyer and Party of the U politician, he has served in the Congress of Colombia since 2002, first as a Member of the Chamber of Representatives and then as a Senator since 2006, having been replaced temporarily by Julio César Bastidas Castillo in 2004.
