= Citizen Option =

Political party in Colombia

Citizen Option Partido Opción Ciudadana
- Founded: November 2009
- Dissolved: 2022
- Ideology: Right-wing populism National conservatism Economic liberalism Social conservatism
- Political position: Right-wing to far-right
- Chamber of Representatives: 0 / 188
- Senate: 0 / 108
- Governors: 0 / 32
- Mayors: 0 / 1,102

Website
- www.partidoopcionciudadana.com

Citizen Option (Spanish: Opción Ciudadana) was a political party in Colombia founded November 9, 2009 at the national convention of the former Citizens' Convergence movement. In 2013, it changed its name again to Citizen Option.

== History ==
=== Origins ===
The party was first created under the name of Citizen Convergence (Spanish: Convergencia Ciudadana) by Luis Alberto Gil Colorado (former member of the M-19 guerrilla) in 1997. In 2002 it decided to help the government of president Alvaro Uribe without being part of it. During this time, it received politicians rejected by other Uribist groups due to their links with Paramilitarism.

=== National Integration Party ===
The party then became the National Integration Party (Spanish: Partido de Integración Nacional), in November 2009 aiming to participate in the 2010 elections.

It has been linked with the Colombian parapolitics scandal in which Colombia paramilitaries were found to be influencing Colombian politics, and considered a "reincarnation" of the banned National Democratic Alliance, as well as other parties including Colombia Viva and Convergencia Ciudadana. The imprisoned Senator Luis Alberto Gil is said to be a major influence on PIN. Among the party's candidates were many friends and relatives of politicians with links to far-right militias and criminal gangs. Since the March 2010 congressional elections, the party has held 9 out of 102 seats in the Senate and 11 of the 166 seats in the House of Representatives.

=== Citizen Option ===
The party changed its name once again in 2013 to clean the image of the party for the 2014 elections. In the end, they got 5 senators and 6 representatives. in March 2015, they were officially accepted as part of the ruling National Unity coalition.

== See also ==
- Category:Citizen Option politicians
