= Colombian Community and Communal Political Movement =

Political party in Colombia

Colombian Community and Communal Political Movement Movimiento Comunal y Comunitario de Colombia
- Founded: 1997
- Ideology: Civism; Communitarism; Populism
- Political position: Centre

The Colombian Community and Communal Political Movement (Movimiento Comunal y Comunitario de Colombia) was a populist and civic political party in Colombia. During the 2002 legislative elections, the party was one of the many small parties to get parliamentary representation. In the election of 2006, the party won zero seats.
