= People's Will Movement =

Political party in Colombia

The People's Will Movement (Movimiento Voluntad Popular) is a political party in Colombia. At the 2002 Colombian parliamentary election, the party won, as one of the many small parties, parliamentary representation.
