= Democratic Progressivity =

Political party in Colombia

Democratic Progressivity (Progresismo Democrático) is a political party in Colombia. In the 2002 legislative elections, the party won, as one of the many small parties, parliamentary representation.
