= Moral and Social Vanguard Party Let's Go Colombia =

Political party in Colombia

The Moral and Social Vanguard Party Let's Go Colombia (Partido Vanguardia Moral y Social Vamos Colombia) is a progressive political party in Colombia. They gained recognition from the National Electoral Council (CNE) in July 1997 with its president as Luis Elmer Arenas Parra. The party was formed by reservists from the Colombian Armed Forces. In the 2002 legislative elections, the party won, as one of the many small parties, parliamentary representation.
