= Front of Hope =

Political party in Colombia

The Front of Hope (Frente de Esperanza) is a political party in Colombia. In the 2002 legislative elections, the party won, as one of the many small parties, parliamentary representation.
