= New Democratic Force =

The New Democratic Force (Nueva Fuerza Democrática) is a conservative political party in Colombia. At the last legislative elections, on 10 March 2002, the party won as one of the many small parties parliamentary representation.

== History ==
The New Democratic Force was founded in 1990 in the context of the electoral weakening of conservatism, with a view to participating in the legislative and presidential elections to which the former mayor of Bogotá Andrés Pastrana aspired.

In the 1991 elections, the Senate list, headed by Pastrana himself, obtained more than 400,000 votes and the election of nine senators, among which were names such as Eduardo Pizano, Claudia Blum and Efraín Cepeda.

The party was part of the government of César Gaviria with the ministers Luis Alberto Moreno and Luis Fernando Ramírez. Later, it would be one of the parties that integrated the coalitions that supported Andrés Pastrana's presidential aspirations in the elections of 1994 and 1998.

Later, several of the New Democratic Force militants would rejoin the Conservative Party, definitively losing their legal status in 2006, following the political reform that restructured the legislative elections in Colombia.

In 2023, the National Electoral Council decided to return legal status to the New Democratic Force, considering the circumstances of extermination suffered by the party as a result of the internal armed conflict in Colombia.
