= Living Colombia Movement =

Political party in Colombia

The Living Colombia Movement (Movimiento Colombia Viva) was a political party in Colombia. The party took part in the parliamentary elections of 2006, in which the movement won 166 deputy seats and two senators out of one hundred.
