= Liberal Opening Movement =

The Liberal Opening (Spanish: Movimiento Apertura Liberal) was a liberal political party in Colombia. In the 2002 legislative elections, the party won, as one of the many small parties, parliamentary representation. In the legislative elections of 2006, the party won 5 of the 166 deputies and no senators. In 2010, despite winning representation again with 2 deputies following the election, the party lost its official recognition and was deregistered for failing to meet a 2% national vote share threshold.
