= Green Alliance (Colombia) =

Colombian political party

Green Alliance Alianza Verde
- Co-Presidents: Luis Carlos Avellaneda; Antonio Sanguino
- Founded: 2005
- Headquarters: Bogotá, Colombia
- Youth wing: Jóvenes Verdes
- LGBT wing: Verdes a Colores
- Ideology: Green politics; Progressivism; Social liberalism; Factions: Conservatism
- Political position: Centre-left; Factions: Right-wing
- Regional affiliation: Federation of the Green Parties of the Americas; São Paulo Forum
- International affiliation: Global Greens
- Colours: Green
- Chamber of Representatives: 15 / 188
- Senate: 9 / 108
- Governors: 3 / 32
- Mayors: 50 / 1,102

Website
- www.alianzaverde.org.co

The Green Alliance (Spanish: Alianza Verde) is a centre-left and green political party in Colombia. The party advocates social justice, electoral reform and economic sustainability. While the Green Alliance is left-liberal, there are some right-wing/conservative factions (with some of its members being in the leadership of the party) that contrast the progressive faction. Both factions were prominently a part of the Senate list led by Luis Garzon.

The party supports the Colombian peace process and formed the electoral alliance Coalition Colombia with centrist and centre-left parties such as Civic Compromise to present a single presidential candidate, Sergio Fajardo in the 2018 presidential election.

== History ==
The party was founded on November 25, 2005, in Bogotá by a group of people headed by Carlos Ramón González Merchan and Elías Pineda.

=== 2007 regional elections ===
For the 28 October 2007 Colombian regional elections to elect department governors, department assembly deputies, mayors and councils and Local Administrative Juntas the party surprisingly won the governorships of Cesar with candidate Cristian Moreno Panezo and Boyacá with candidate José Roso Millán. The party also obtained 23 municipal mayors.

=== 2010 congressional elections ===
Three independent former mayors of Bogotá, Luis Eduardo Garzón, Antanas Mockus, and Enrique Peñalosa, formed an alliance to choose an independent candidate for the presidency. However, they required a political structure. The ad-hoc coalition merged with the Centre Option Green Party, which changed its name to Green Party. Following this, the new party joined by many regional politicians.

Mockus was elected candidate for the presidency in the Green Party's primary elections, held on March 14, 2010. On the same day, the party gained five seats in the Senate. Independent presidential candidate and former mayor of Medellín, Sergio Fajardo, joined the Mockus campaign soon after and was chosen as the Green Party's vice presidential candidate.

=== 2010 presidential elections ===
On May 30, 2010, the party's candidate Antanas Mockus came second in the first round of the 2010 presidential election with 21% of the vote. In the second round, he was defeated by Juan Manuel Santos, who won 68% of the vote to Mockus' 29%.

=== Slogans ===
- "Your Life is Sacred"
- "Public Resources are Sacred"
- "Not Everything is Justifiable"
- "Conscience Vote"
- "Natural Resources Are Sacred"

== Electoral results ==
=== Presidential elections ===
Election Year	Candidate	Running mate	First Round		Second Round		Result
Election Year	Candidate	Running mate	Votes	Percentage	Votes	Percentage	Result
2010	Antanas Mockus	Sergio Fajardo	3,134,222	21.51 (#2)	3,587,975	27.47 (#2)	Lost
2014	Enrique Peñalosa	Isabel Segovia	1,064,758	8.27 (#5)			Lost
2018	Sergio Fajardo	Claudia López	4,602,916	23.78 (#3)			Lost
2022	With Hope Center Coalition						Lost

=== Legislative elections ===
Election Year	House of Representatives			Senate		
Election Year	Votes	Percentage	Seats	Votes	Percentage	Seats
2010	296,137	3,13 (#7)	3 / 166	521,503	4,9 (#7)	5 / 102
2014	483,407	4.07 (#6)	6 / 166	567,102	4.78 (#6)	5 / 102
2018	880,354	5.95 (#6)	9 / 166	1,308,208	8.57 (#6)	9 / 102
2022	With Hope Center Coalition			With Hope Center Coalition		
2026	654,197	3.48 (#7)	4 / 161	With Alliance for Colombia		

== See also ==
- Oxygen Green Party
- List of political parties in Colombia
