= Regional Integration Movement =

Political party in Colombia

The Regional Integration Movement (Movimiento Integración Regional) is a political party in Colombia. At the last legislative elections on March 10, 2002, the party won as one of the many small parties parliamentary representation. In the simultaneous legislative elections of 2006, the party won 4 out of 166 Deputies and no senators.
