= Alternative Democratic Pole =

Colombian political party

Alternative Democratic Pole Polo Democrático Alternativo
- President: Alexander López Maya
- Senate leader: Iván Cepeda Castro
- Founded: December 2005
- Dissolved: 2025
- Merger of: Independent Democratic Pole; Democratic Alternative
- Merged into: Historic Pact
- Headquarters: Bogotá, Colombia
- Youth wing: Polo Joven
- Ideology: Social democracy Democratic socialism Progressivism; Protectionism; Camilism
- Political position: Left-wing
- National affiliation: Historic Pact for Colombia (from 2021)
- Regional affiliation: São Paulo Forum
- Colours: Yellow

Website
- www.polodemocratico.net

The Alternative Democratic Pole (Spanish: Polo Democrático Alternativo, PDA) was a left-wing, democratic socialist and Camilist political party in Colombia, founded in 2005. In 2022 it was successful at the polls and formed the Government of Colombia as part of the Historic Pact for Colombia.

It was founded as a political alliance of the Independent Democratic Pole (PDI) and the Democratic Alternative (AD) in December 2005. Both parties opposed the neoliberal economic program, securitization and militarization of Colombia under then-President Álvaro Uribe. Subsequently, it was the only parliamentary party to declare opposition to the government of Juan Manuel Santos, and then joined the opposition against the government of Ivan Duque.

As of 2009, a considerable number of PDA politicians were still former guerrilla fighters who gave up armed struggle and demobilized during the late 1980s and early 1990s. And by 2012, a considerable part of PDA politicians including the former guerrilla fighters were more aligned with the Green Party, the Movimiento Progresistas, or Marcha Patriótica, than the PDA.

== Political development ==
The PDI and AD initially had their own pre-candidates for the 2006 presidential race. PDI had nominated Antonio Navarro (former leader of M-19) and AD had nominated Carlos Gaviria.

In a primary election held on 12 March 2006, Gaviria won the presidential nomination of the PDA.

In the simultaneous legislative elections of 2006, the party won 9 out of 166 Deputies and 11 out of 100 senators.

At the presidential elections of 28 May 2006, Carlos Gaviria came second with 22.04% of the vote, 2,613,157 votes. This was the highest ever result for a left-wing candidate in Colombia's history. Thus, the party replaced the long-standing Liberal Party as the country's second force and main opposition party.

After the election, the PDA was successful in gaining the support of groups representing the indigenous movement affiliated with the coalition. The guerrilla group National Liberation Army (ELN) (at its fourth national congress) commented favorably on the PDA's electoral performance and declared that political action should take precedence over armed struggle. PDA's own founding doctrine repudiates armed guerilla politics: "We oppose war and the exercise of violence as means of political action".

Later the PDA further consolidated its organization and gained support on a local level. In October 2007, the PDA's candidate, Samuel Moreno Rojas won the mayoral election in Colombia's capital Bogotá.

In the 2010 congressional election, PDA's support declined. It won 7.8% of votes and 8 of 100 seats in the Senate, and 5.9% of the vote and 4 of 164 seats in the House of Representatives, demoting it to the sixth rank among parliamentary parties. Before the election, a faction of the PDA had split off and joined the Green Party.

Clara Lopez was the party's candidate for the 2014 presidential election; she placed fourth in the first round of the election, receiving 1,958,414 votes, representing 15.23%.

For the 2022 presidential and parliamentary election, the party joined forces with other left-wing and centre-left parties to form the Historic Pact for Colombia (Spanish PHxC) alliance, whose candidates Gustavo Petro and PDA member Francia Márquez, were victorious in the second round of the presidential election, making them the first leftists to assume the Presidency and Vice-Presidency in Colombian history. In the parliamentary elections, PHxC candidates, including PDA members, won the most votes in both the Chamber of Representatives and Senatorial elections; in both chambers seats are awarded by proportional representation.

== Electoral history ==
=== Presidential elections ===
Election year	Candidate	# votes	% vote	Result	Note
2006	Carlos Gaviria Díaz	2,609,412	22.04% (2nd)	✗ Defeated	
2010	Gustavo Petro	1,331,267	9.14% (4th)	✗ Defeated	
2014	Clara López Obregón	1,958,414	15.23% (4th)	✗ Defeated	
2018	Sergio Fajardo	4,602,916	23.78% (3rd)	✗ Defeated	
2022	Gustavo Petro	11,291,986	50.44% (1st)	✓ Winner	coalition with Historic Pact for Colombia

=== Legislative elections ===
Election Year	House of Representatives			Senate		
Election Year	Votes	Percentage	Seats	Votes	Percentage	Seats
2006	677,964	7,66 (#5)	7 / 166	563,060	9,71 (#5)	10 / 102
2010	563,555	5,86 (#6)	5 / 166	824,948	7,82 (#6)	8 / 102
2014	414,346	3,8 (#10)	3 / 166	541,145	3,78 (#7)	5 / 102
2018	416,766	3,0 (#7)	2 / 166	736,367	4,80 (#7)	5 / 102
2022	With Historic Pact for Colombia			With Historic Pact for Colombia		

== See also ==
- Politics of Colombia
- List of political parties in Colombia
