= National Movement (Colombia) =

The National Movement (Movimiento Nacional) was a conservative political party in Colombia. It was a temporary splinter from the Colombian Conservative Party.

At the 2002 Colombian parliamentary election, the party won parliamentary representation as one of the minor parties. In the following legislative elections of 2006, the party elected 2 out of 166 Deputies and no senators. As of 2025, it is not registered as an active political party in Colombia.
