= Indigenous Authorities of Colombia =

Political party in Colombia

Indigenous Authorities of Colombia Autoridades Indígenas de Colombia
- Leader: Laudelino Bernier
- Founded: 1978
- Registered: 15 August 1991
- Ideology: Indigenismo; Progressivism
- Political position: Centre-left to left-wing
- National affiliation: Historic Pact for Colombia
- Senate: 1 / 108

Website
- AICO web

The Indigenous Authorities of Colombia (Spanish: Autoridades Indígenas de Colombia, AICO) is a progressive indigenist political party in Colombia.

== History ==
Originally named the Indigenous Authorities of the Southwest, the party was renamed Indigenous Authorities of Colombia in 1991. The party contested the 1990 Constitutional Assembly election as an independent list, winning one seat, Following the promulgation of the new constitution, AICO participated in the 1991 parliamentary elections. In the Senate election the party registered to contest the seats reserved for indigenous members, but received enough votes to win a seat at the national level, resulting in the party taking one seat in the national constituency and other parties taking the two indigenous seats. The party also won one seat in the Chamber of Representatives.

In the 1994 elections AICO retained its Senate seat, but lost its seat in the Chamber of Representatives. The 1998 elections saw the same outcome, with Martín Emilio Tenganá winning the Senate seat. However, his election was subsequently annulled as he was not old enough at the time of his election. In 2002 the party retained its Senate seat and won a seat in the Chamber of Representatives. Although it lost its Chamber seat in the 2006 elections, the party regained a seat in the Senate. This result was repeated in the 2010 elections. In the 2011 regional elections AICO's Roberto Jaramillo Garcia was elected governor of Vaupés Department.

The 2014 elections saw the party lose its Senate seat but win a seat in the Chamber. In 2018 the party won a seat in the Senate but lost its seat in the Chamber. The 2022 elections saw the party retain its Senate seat but remain unrepresented in the Chamber.
