= Citizens' Convergence =

The Citizens' Convergence (Convergencia Ciudadana) was a right-wing populist political party in Colombia. In the 2002 legislative elections, the party won parliamentary representation. In the election of 2006, the party won 8 out of 166 Deputies and 7 out of 100 senators. In 2009, the party transformed into the Citizen Option.
