= Radical Change =

Radical Change Cambio Radical
- President: Germán Córdoba
- Founded: January 15, 1998
- Split from: Colombian Liberal Party
- Headquarters: Bogotá
- Ideology: Conservative liberalism
- Political position: Centre to centre-right
- Colors: Red Blue
- Chamber of Representatives: 16 / 188
- Senate: 11 / 108
- Governors: 7 / 32

Website
- www.partidocambioradical.org

Radical Change (Spanish: Cambio Radical, CR, stylised as CЯ, with a backwards "R") is a conservative liberal political party in Colombia.

After the elections on 12 March 2006, the party became one of the most important in the new Congress, receiving 20 seats in the lower house and 15 in the upper house. Along with the Social Party of National Unity, or "Party of the U" (the largest party in the lower house and the second-largest in the upper house) and the Conservative Party, it was president Álvaro Uribe's main ally in Congress and formed part of his majority.

It is currently in opposition to the left-wing government of Gustavo Petro.

== History ==
=== Origin ===
After the tenure of president Ernesto Samper (1994-1998), a faction of the Liberal Party was not happy with the new social democratic route the party was moving towards. As such, a more right-wing faction of the party split away and formed Radical Change. However, it did not run for either parliamentary or presidential elections during the 1990s. It took on its current name on July 5, 2000.

== Uribe government ==
In the 2002 elections, the party won two seats in the Senate and seven in the chamber of representatives. The party joined a coalition with the government of Álvaro Uribe, and voted in favor of the re-electionist project; this involved changing sections of the constitution that prevent a president from running for a second term. The 2006 election was their best electoral year. They became the 4th largest political group in Congress with 15 senators and 18 representatives. They remained in coalition with the Uribe administration and supported his candidacy for re-election. German Vargas Lleras, then leader of the party and senator, became one of the Senate's most active voices.

=== Breakup ===
The biggest party in Congress (and Uribe's new U Party) proposed to change the constitution, yet again, to allow the president to run for a third term. The party was divided between those who wanted a second direct re-election for a third term and those who were against it. Vargas Lleras was among those opposed.

Although a third term was deemed unconstitutional by the Supreme Court, the damage was done and those who still supported Uribe quit the party to run for Congress in the 2010 parliamentary elections with the newly-formed U party.

The party suffered big blows in 2010, losing votes and members in both chambers: seven Senators and two Representatives. Vargas Lleras then ran as the candidate in the 2010 presidential election, finishing in third place in the first round. The party then joined the first-round winner, Juan Manuel Santos, along with the Liberal Party and the Conservative party to form the "National Unity Pact" that would work together for the next four years.

=== National Unity Pact ===
The party assisted the government with most of their agenda in Congress.

When the peace talks with the FARC began, the party offered their approval and criticized then ex-President Álvaro Uribe for opposing dialogue.

In 2014, the party participated in the parliamentary elections and joined in a coalition with Santos for his reelection. Vargas Lleras was named the vice-presidential candidate. Although the party received fewer votes than in 2010, they added one senator, but lost one seat in the lower chamber. Santos won the second round of the presidential elections that year, making the vice-presidential position the highest the party had ever achieved.

== Electoral history ==
=== Presidential elections ===
Election Year	Candidate	Running mate	First Round		Second Round		Result
Election Year	Candidate	Running mate	Votes	Percentage	Votes	Percentage	Result
2006	Álvaro Uribe	Francisco Santos	7,397,835	62,5 % (#1)			Won
2010	Germán Vargas	Elsa Noguera	1,473,627	10,1 % (#3)			Lost
2014	Juan Manuel Santos	Germán Vargas	3,310,794	25,7 % (#2)	7,839,342	50,9 % (#1)	Won
2018	Germán Vargas	Juan Carlos Pinzón	1,412,392	7,3 % (#4)			Lost
2022	Federico Gutiérrez	Rodrigo Lara	5,069,448	23,9 % (#3)			Lost

=== Legislative elections ===
Election Year	House of Representatives			Senate		
Election Year	Votes	Percentage	Seats	Votes	Percentage	Seats
2002	352,547	3,40 (#3)	7 / 166	118,003	2,16 (#8)	2 / 102
2006	932,207	10,7 (#4)	21 / 166	1,211,457	14,7 (#4)	15 / 102
2010	723,295	7,6 (#4)	16 / 166	861,816	7,5 (#5)	8 / 102
2014	1,108,502	7,7 (#5)	15 / 166	996,872	8,1 (#5)	9 / 102
2018	2,140,464	14,4 (#3)	30 / 172	2,155,487	14,0 (#2)	16 / 108
2022	1,391,339	8,5 (#5)	16 / 188	1,610,651	10,2 (#6)	11 / 108
2026	806,205	4.29 (#6)	9 / 161	1,241,082 (with ALMA Coalition)	6.37 (#7)	7 / 103
