= Independent Social Alliance =

Political party in Colombia

Independent Social Alliance Alianza Social Independiente
- President: Alonso Tobón
- Founded: 1991
- Ideology: Indigenismo; Progressivism; Reformism
- Political position: Centre-left
- National affiliation: List of Decency (2017–2018); Coalition of Hope
- Senate: 4 / 108

Website
- ASI web

The Independent Social Alliance (Spanish: Alianza Social Independiente, ASI), known as the Indigenous Social Alliance (Spanish: Alianza Social Indígena) until 2011, is a progressive indigenist party in Colombia. At the last legislative elections, 10 March 2002, the party won parliamentary representation, one of many smaller parties.

== History ==
The movement emerged in 1991 after the guarantees provided by the new National Constitution, it was made up of indigenous people, peasants, community leaders from popular neighborhoods of Popayán, a women's organization and the amnestied indigenous people of the Quintín Lame Armed Movement, who aspired to become a new political alternative. The first Assembly was held in the indigenous community of Yaguará, municipality of Chaparral, Tolima. There were indigenous and non-indigenous leaders who since 1969 had been working to promote the movement in favor of Amerindian communities, especially in Cauca, Tolima and Antioquia; Also participating were leaders of the Cauca peasant movement and urban leaders of the neighborhoods undergoing reconstruction after the Popayán earthquake. Over the course of a few years, the party has extended its endorsements not only to candidates belonging to indigenous communities, but to independent candidates who are generally in the political center or the center-left. The party endorsed the candidacy of Antanas Mockus for the Presidency of the Republic in the 2006 elections. The party's leader is the indigenous senator Marco Avirama, and its president is the Antioqueño Alonso Tobón.

On December 2, 2005, the movement announced its support for Antanas Mockus in the 2006 presidential campaign. In the election of 2006, the party won two (out of a hundred) senatorial seats.
