= Chamber of Representatives of Colombia =

Lower house of the Congress of Colombia

Coordinates: 4°35′54″N 74°04′36″W

Chamber of Representatives Cámara de Representantes
- 10th Congress
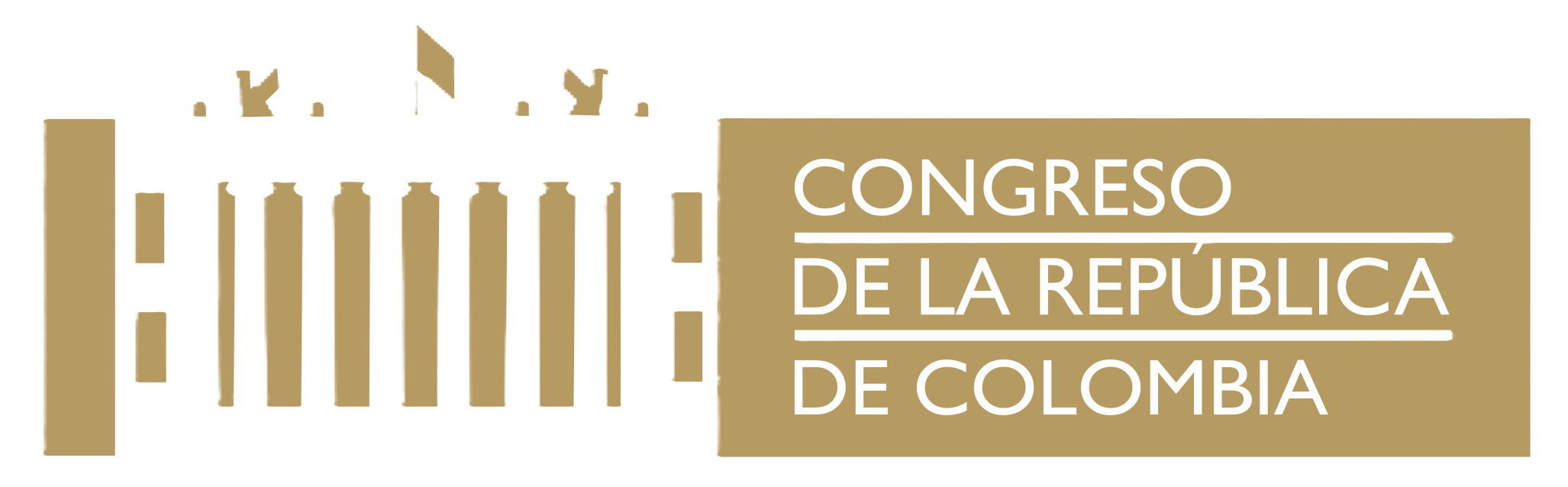

Type
- Type: Lower house of the Congress of Colombia

Leadership
- President: Nicolás Barguil (C) since 20 July 2026
- First Vice President: Simón Molina (Creemos) since 20 July 2026
- Second Vice President: Erick Velasco (PH) since 20 July 2026

Structure
- Seats: 183
- Political groups: Government (120): Democratic Center (30); Liberal (24); Conservative (20); Union Party (13); Radical Change (12); Civil Conflict Victims (11); Democratic Party (3); Independent Social Alliance (2); Reborn Colombia (2); Creemos (2); National Salvation Movement (1); Independents (17): Green Alliance (7); Civil Conflict Victims (5); New Liberalism (2); MIRA (1); La Fuerza (1); Raizal (1); Opposition (46): Historic Pact (43); Afro-Colombians (2); MAIS (1)

Elections
- Voting system: Proportional representation
- Last election: 8 March 2026
- Next election: March 2030

Meeting place
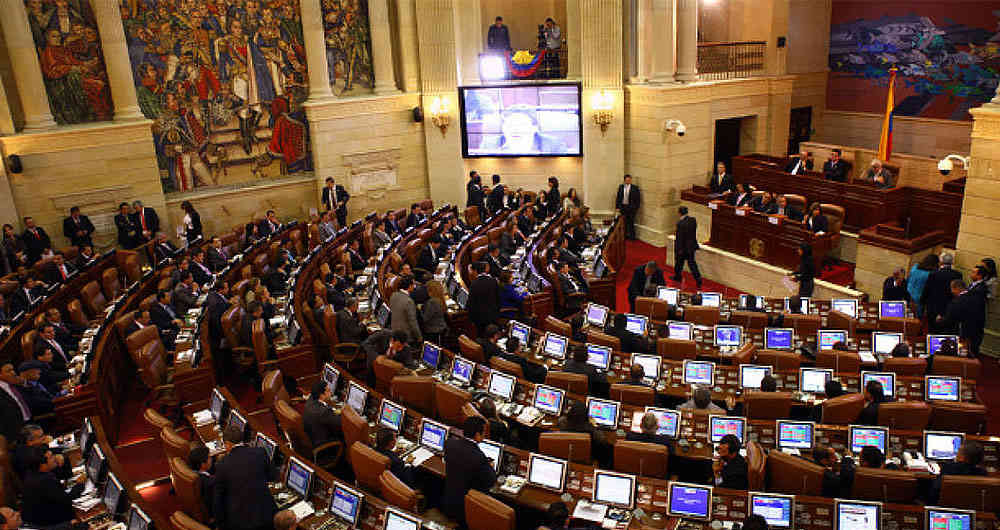
- Capitolio Nacional, Bogotá

Website
- camara.gov.co

The Chamber of Representatives (Spanish: Cámara de Representantes de la República de Colombia) is the lower house of the Congress of Colombia. It has 183 members elected to four-year terms.

== Elections and electoral system ==
According to the Colombian Constitution of 1991, the Chamber of Representatives, currently composed of 183 representatives serving four-year terms, is elected in territorial constituencies, special constituencies and an international constituency.

The departments (and the capital district of Bogotá D.C.) each form territorial electoral constituencies (circunscripciones territoriales). Each constituency has at least two members, and one more for every 365,000 inhabitants or fraction greater than 182,500 over and above the initial 365,000. For the legislative term 2014-2018, 161 of the Chamber's 183 members were elected in territorial constituencies.

There are also three special constituencies, electing the remaining five members: one for Indigenous communities currently with one representative, one for Afro-Colombian communities (negritudes) currently with two representatives and one for Colombian citizens resident abroad currently with one representative. As a result of the 2015 constitutional reform, the number of seats allocated to Colombian citizens resident abroad was reduced to one, from 2018 onward, as an additional special seat will be created for the territorial constituency of Archipelago of San Andrés, Providencia and Santa Catalina to represent the archipelago's Raizal community.

Since 2014, the assignment of additional seats is based on the corresponding proportional increase of the national population in accordance with census results. If as a result of the above a territorial constituency should lose one or more seats, it keeps the number of seats to which it was entitled to on July 20, 2002.

For elections to the Chamber, political parties or other movements and groups run single lists, with a number of candidates not exceeding the total number of seats to be filled, although in constituencies with only two seats, party lists may include a third name. The current threshold for parties to win seats in a territorial constituency is 50% of the electoral quotient (total votes divided by total seats) in constituencies returning more than two members, and 30% of the electoral quotient in constituencies returning two members. Seats are then distributed using the distributing number, or cifra repartidora. This number is obtained by successively dividing the number of votes received by each list by one, two, three and so forth, and placing the results in descending order until the total number of results equal to the number of seats to be filled. The lowest resulting number is called the distributing number (cifra repartidora). Each list shall obtain the number of seats that corresponds to the number of times the distributing number is contained in the total number of its votes.

Parties may run a closed list, with the order of candidates pre-determined, or opt for preferential voting (open list), where the position of candidates on the list is reordered based on the individual preference votes of the voters. In congressional elections, voters choosing a party running a closed list only vote for the party list; voters who choose a party running an open list may indicate their candidate of preference among the names displayed on the ballot, if the voter does not indicate a preference and only votes for the party, the vote is valid for purposes of the threshold but not for reordering the list based on preferential votes.

The most recent parliamentary election in Colombia took place on 8 March 2026.

== Exclusive powers ==
1. Elect the Ombudsman.
2. Examine and finalize the general budgetary and treasury account presented to it by the Comptroller General.
3. Bring charges to the Senate, at the request of the investigation and accusation commission, for the impeachment of the President (or whoever replaces them) and members of the Comisión de Aforados.
4. Take cognizance of complaints and grievances presented by the Attorney General or by individuals against the aforementioned officials and, if valid, to bring charges on that basis before the Senate.
5. Request the aid of other authorities to pursue the investigations.

=== Judicial powers ===
Until the 2015 constitutional reform, the investigation and accusation commission (Comisión de Investigación y Acusación) of the House of Representatives was recommending to the plenary the indictment of the President, Constitutional Court justices, Supreme Court justices, Superior Council of the Judiciary members, Council of State justices and the Attorney General. These senior officials of the State were said to benefit from a "constitutional fuero", first enshrined in the 1886 Constitution and kept by the 1991 Constitution, although cabinet ministers lost their special constitutional protection in 1992.

The House's accusation commission had been very criticized over the years, said to grant immunity to any senior official accused of corruption or wrongdoing. Between 1886 and 2014, only one of Colombia's 40 presidents, Gustavo Rojas Pinilla, was charged and sentenced by Congress in 1959 (after the end of his term), and that ruling was overturned by the Supreme Court seven years later. Between 1992 and 2014, the accusations commission received a total of 3,496 complaints, of which 56% were closed and 44% still pending. No case resulted in impeachment, and in fact only one case ever made its way to the floor of the House, that of President Ernesto Samper for the Proceso 8000.

=== Comisión de Aforados ===
The government's constitutional reform in 2015 stripped the accusations commission of most of its power and restricted the existing fuero constitucional to the President. In its stead, the 2015 reform created the Comisión de Aforados, which will investigate and indict the aforementioned judges and Attorney General, even if they may have ceased to exercise their functions. The commission will be made up of five members elected by a joint session of Congress for individual eight-year terms, from lists sent by the Council of Judicial Government and elaborated through a public competition. The eligibility, ineligibility and incompatibility rules for the commission will be the same as for members of the Supreme Court of Justice.

In the case of investigations for unworthiness to serve for misconduct, the new commission shall present its charges, when necessary, to the House of Representatives, which will only be able to suspend or remove the accused from office. The House decision can be appealed to the Senate, which holds the final word. In such cases, the commission will have 60 days to present an accusation and 30 days to decide. In the case of investigations for other crimes, the commission shall present charges to the Supreme Court of Justice for further prosecution.

The new commission will be formed after a transitional period of one year, during which the accusations commission retains its original responsibilities.

== Composition ==
=== Current seat distribution by constituencies ===
Territorial and special constituencies
| Constituency | Number of seats (2014–2018) |
|---|---|
| Amazonas | 2 |
| Antioquia | 17 |
| Arauca | 2 |
| Atlántico | 7 |
| Bogotá | 18 |
| Bolívar | 6 |
| Boyacá | 6 |
| Caldas | 5 |
| Caquetá | 2 |
| Casanare | 2 |
| Cauca | 4 |
| Cesar | 4 |
| Chocó | 2 |
| Córdoba | 5 |
| Cundinamarca | 7 |
| Guainía | 2 |
| Guaviare | 2 |
| Huila | 4 |
| La Guajira | 2 |
| Magdalena | 5 |
| Meta | 3 |
| Nariño | 5 |
| Norte de Santander | 5 |
| Putumayo | 2 |
| Quindío | 3 |
| Risaralda | 4 |
| San Andrés and Providencia | 2 |
| Santander | 7 |
| Sucre | 3 |
| Tolima | 6 |
| Valle del Cauca | 13 |
| Vaupés | 2 |
| Vichada | 2 |
| Afro-Colombians | 2 |
| Colombian citizens abroad | 2 |
| Indigenous communities | 1 |
| Total seats | 166 |

=== Seat distribution by party (1991–2026) ===
| Election | Resulting seat distribution |
|---|---|
| 1991 | 87 / 27 / 13 / 10 / 3 / 21; PLC / PCC / M19 / SN / UP / Other |
| 1994 | 88 / 40 / 1 / 1 / 33; PLC / PCC / M19 / SN / Other |
| 1998 | 84 / 28 / 3 / 2 / 1 / 43; PLC / PCC / NFD / ASI / SN / Other |
| 2002 | 54 / 21 / 7 / 5 / 4 / 2 / 2 / 1 / 66; PLC / PCC / CR / AL / EQ / CC / SN / NFD / Other |
| 2006 | 35 / 30 / 29 / 20 / 8 / 8 / 8 / 5 / 1 / 1 / 21; PLC / PUG / PCC / CR / CC / EQ / Polo / AL / MIRA / MSN / Other |
| 2010 | 48 / 38 / 36 / 16 / 11 / 5 / 3 / 2 / 1 / 1 / 1 / 3; PUG / PLC / PCC / CR / OC / Polo / AV / AL / ASI / EQ / MIRA / Other |
| 2014 | 39 / 37 / 27 / 19 / 16 / 6 / 6 / 3 / 3 / 1 / 9; PLC / PUG / PCC / CD / CR / AV / OC / MIRA / Polo / ASI / Other |
| 2018 | 35 / 32 / 30 / 25 / 21 / 9 / 5 / 3 / 2 / 2 / 2 / 1 / 1 / 3; PLC / CD / CR / PUG / PCC / AV / CM / LD / MAIS / OC / Polo / CJL / MIRA / Other |
| 2022 | 33 / 27 / 27 / 18 / 16 / 16 / 15 / 5 / 3 / 2 / 1 / 1 / 1 / 1 / 16 / 5; PLC / PCC / PH / CR / CD / PUG / AV / CM / Liga / NL / CoR / Dem / MAIS / MIRA / CITREP / Other |
| 2026 | 42 / 30 / 24 / 20 / 13 / 12 / 8 / 3 / 2 / 2 / 2 / 2 / 1 / 1 / 1 / 1 / 16 / 2; PH / CD / PLC / PCC / PUG / CR / AV / Dem / ASI / CoR / Cr / NL / LF / MAIS / MIRA / SN / CITREP / Other |

== See also ==
- Constitutional history of Colombia
- List of presidents of the Chamber of Representatives of Colombia
