= Carlos Eduardo Guevara Villabón =

Colombian industrial engineer and politician

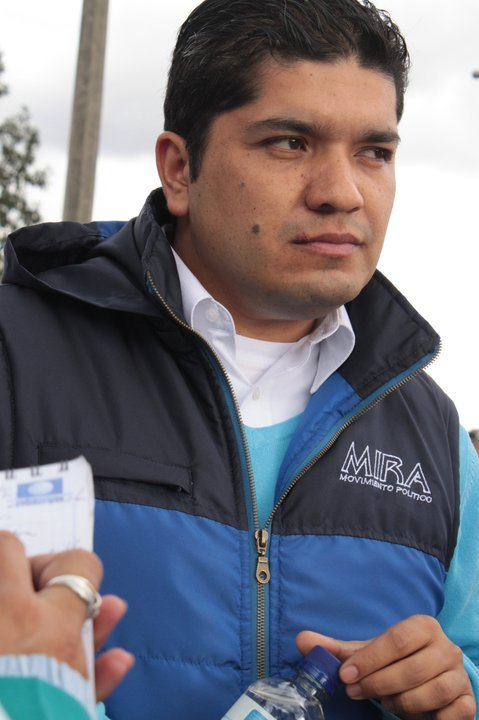

Member of the Senate of Colombia
- Incumbent
- Assumed office 20 July 2018

Member of the Chamber of Representatives of Colombia
- In office 20 July 2014 – 20 July 2018
- Constituency: Bogotá, D.C.

Member of the Bogotá City Council
- In office 29 July 2009 – 31 December 2011

Personal details
- Born: 29 January 1977 (age 49) Bogotá, D.C., Colombia
- Party: Independent Movement of Absolute Renovation
- Education: District University of Bogotá
- Profession: Industrial engineer
- Website: www.carlosguevara.co

Carlos Eduardo Guevara Villabón (born 29 January 1977) is a Colombian Industrial engineer and politician. He was Councillor of the Bogotá City Council from 2009 to 2011 in replacement of Carlos Alberto Baena. In 2011 he ran for Mayor of Bogotá, D.C. as candidate of the MIRA Party. In 2014 he was elected to the Congress of Colombia as Representative of Bogotá for the 2014–2017 term. In 2018 he was elected Senator with over 66,000 votes. In this year he was also appointed Party Chairman in replacement of Carlos Alberto Baena.

== Political career ==
From his youth, Carlos Eduardo Guevara stood out for its participation in political affairs. He was Chairman of the Youth branch of the MIRA party, before becoming adviser to the Legislative Support Unit of the former Councillor and current Party Chairman, Carlos Alberto Baena. Due to his work and a sound support within the party, Guevara became one of the favorite pupils of Baena.

In 2009 Guevara was appointed Councillor of Bogotá in replacement of Councillor Carlos Alberto Baena. During his term as Councillor, he worked in projects related to the environment, infrastructure, transport and budget. He paid special attention to environmental issues, so he was the author of initiatives to counteract Climate Change, such as those leading to the implementation of Green roofs in Bogotá D.C.

In 2011 he ran for Mayor of Bogotá, D.C., obtaining over 59,000 votes or about 2.65% of the total votes.

In 2014 he ran for Representative of Bogotá and obtained 16,045 votes, which granted him a seat at the Chamber of Representatives of Colombia for the 2014-2019 term. As Representative of Bogotá, Guevara has been known for scrutinizing and debating government policies and laws that increase public services fees, advocating for maintaining or reducing such fees based on citizens particular circumstances and/or public utilities services companies' mismanagement. He also co-authored, along with his parliamentary group, Law 1773, commonly known as Natalia Ponce Law, which increases the sentences related to Acid throwing to up to 50 years of prison.

== Personal life ==
Carlos Eduardo Guevara graduated in Industrial engineering at the District University of Bogotá. He took a specialization course in Public services and Environment at the Universidad Externado de Colombia, and a specialization course in Natural Environment at University of La Sabana. He did an internship at the Inter-American Development Bank, where he studied Political management and Governance.
