= Gloria Stella Díaz =

Colombian lawyer and politician

Gloria Stella Díaz Ortíz
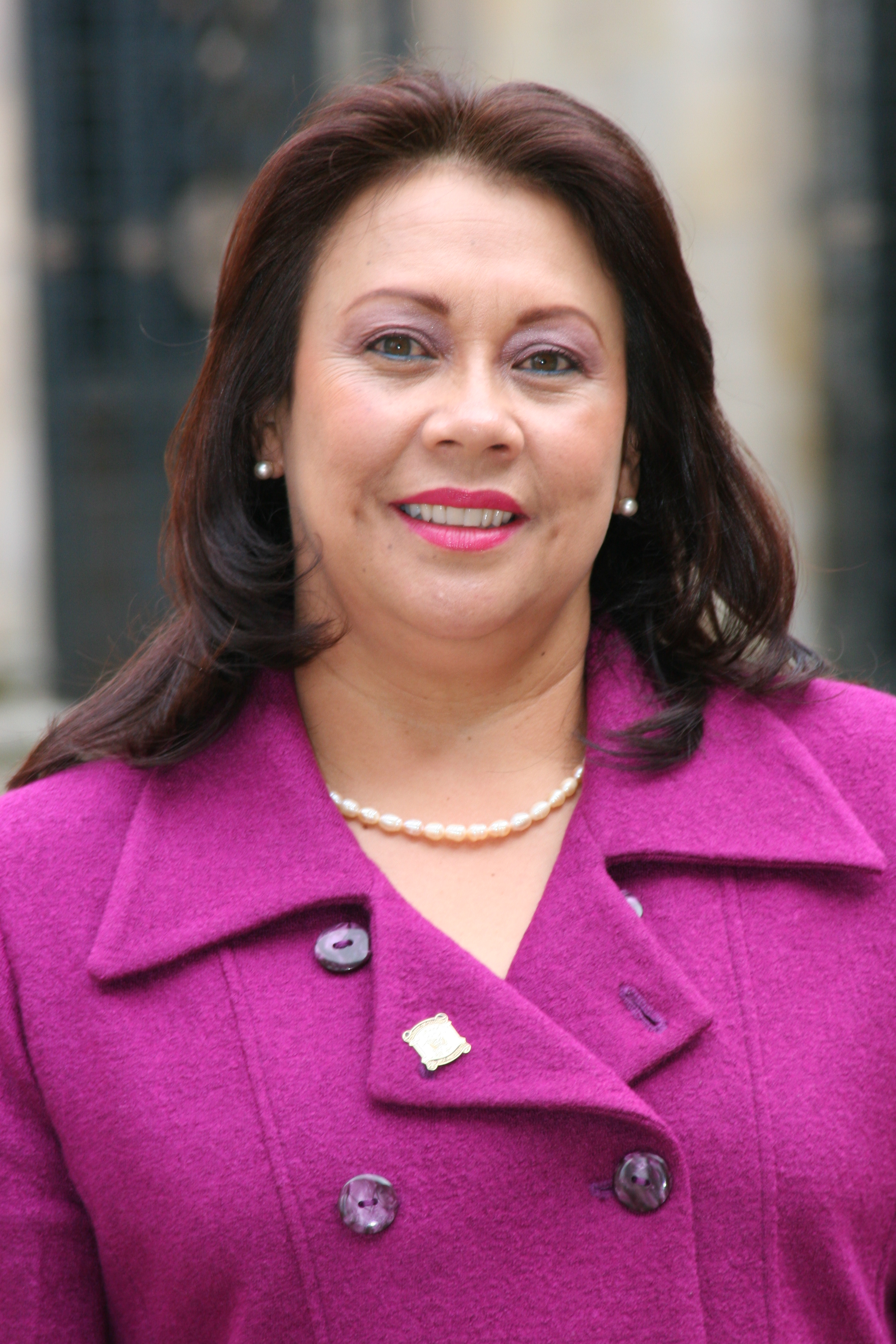

Member of the Bogotá City Council
- Incumbent
- Assumed office 1 January 2016

Member of the Chamber of Representatives of Colombia
- In office 20 July 2006 – 20 June 2014
- Constituency: Bogotá, D.C.

Personal details
- Born: 9 April 1964 (age 62) Bogotá, D.C., Colombia
- Party: Independent Movement of Absolute Renovation
- Education: Free University of Colombia
- Profession: Lawyer and Politician

Gloria Stella Díaz (born 9 April 1964) is a Colombian lawyer and politician. In 2015 she was elected Councillor of Bogotá D.C. for the 2016–2019 term. She was a member of the Chamber of Representatives of Colombia for Bogotá from 2006 to 2014, representing the Independent Movement of Absolute Renovation (MIRA) party. Díaz was temporary Senator in replacement of Senator Alexandra Moreno Piraquive in 2004.

== Political career ==
Díaz's political career has always been as a member of the MIRA party. She occupied a Senator's seat in 2004, when temporarily replaced Senator Alexandra Moreno Piraquive. In 2006, she was elected member of the Chamber of Representatives of Colombia for Bogotá, and she was re-elected in 2010. Díaz was the leader of the closed-electoral list of candidates of the MIRA party for the 2014 Colombian parliamentary election, but that time she was running for Senator.

In 2015 she ran for Councillor of the Bogotá City Council and was elected, obtaining the second highest number of votes (33,524) among the elected Councillors.

=== Recognition ===
Gloria Stella Díaz was recognized as the Best member of the Chamber of Representatives of Colombia in 2006, 2008 and 2009. She has become especially known for her constant efforts to increase the penalties against people who drive under the effects of alcoholic beverages. Díaz has also been recognized as one of the most active members of the Congress of Colombia, and she obtained the record in submission of bills in the legislative term 2010–2013.

== Personal life ==
Gloria Stella Díaz graduated in law at the Free University of Colombia and took a specialization in Family Law at Pontifical Xavierian University. She also studied Government procurement and Economics for Non-economists at University of Los Andes.
