= 2015 Cundinamarca Assembly election =

== Results ==
← Summary of the 25 October 2015 Cundinamarca Assembly election results. →
Party	Vote			Seats	
Party	Votes	%	±bp	Won	+/−
"U" Party (U)	181.817	19,58	▼169	5	±0
Radical Change Party (CR)	115.739	12,46	▼50	3	±0
Colombian Liberal Party (L)	101.812	10,96	▼423	2	▼1
Colombian Conservative Party (C)	88.469	9,53	▼519	2	▼1
Democratic Center	77.659	8,36	New	2	▲2
Green Party (Colombia) (VERDE)	65.206	7,02	▲110	1	±0
Civic Option (PIN)	54.096	5,82	▲92	1	±0
Indigenous Social Alliance Movement (ASI)	30.322	3,26	▲228	0	±0
Independent Movement of Absolute Renovation (MIRA)	23.418	2,52	▼58	0	±0
Alternative Democratic Pole (POLO)	21.893	2,36	▼32	0	±0

Parties with less than 3% of the vote	0	-	-	-	-

Blank ballots	168.308	18,12	▲99		
Total	928.739	100,00		16	±0
Valid votes	928.739	84,29	▲44		
Invalid votes	57.962	5,26	▲85		
Unmarked votes	115.156	10,45	▼129		
Votes cast / turnout	1.101.857	62,99	▼182		
Abstentions	647.441	37,01	▲182		
Registered voters	1.749.298	▲15.6%			
Source: RNEC

== Seats versus vote share ==
Vote share
U	19.58%
CR	12.46%
L	10.96%
C	9.53%
CD	8.36%
VERDE	7.02%
PIN	5.82%
ASI	3.26%
MIRA	2.52%
POLO	2.36%
Blank votes	18.12%

Department Assembly seats
U	31%
CR	19%
L	13%
C	13%
CD	13%
VERDE	6%
PIN	6%
ASI	0%
MIRA	0%
POLO	0%
