= Luis Moreno =

Luis Moreno may refer to:

- Luis Moreno Fernández (1950–2023), Spanish journalist and political scientist
- Luis Moreno Fontanez (1883–1961), Chilean miner and politician
- Luis Moreno (footballer) (born 1981), Panamanian footballer
- Luis Moreno Mansilla (1959–2012), Spanish architect
- Luis Moreno Ocampo (born 1952), Argentine jurist, chief prosecutor of the International Criminal Court
- Luis Moreno Salcedo (1918–1988), Filipino diplomat
- Luis Alberto Moreno (born 1953), Colombian diplomat, president of the Inter-American Development Bank
- Luis Antonio Moreno (born 1970), retired Colombian footballer
- Luis Eduardo Moreno (1934–1996), Colombian preacher
- Luis G. Moreno, ambassador of the United States to Jamaica 2014–2017
- Luis Gabriel Moreno (born 1998), Filipino archer

== See also ==
- Moreno (disambiguation)
