= Vivencias (book) =

2001 autobiography by María Luisa Piraquive

- Author: María Luisa Piraquive
- Language: Spanish
- Genre: Autobiography
- Publisher: Church of God Ministry of Jesus Christ International
- Publication date: 2001
- Publication place: Colombia
- ISBN: 978-958-44-2472-3

Vivencias (Spanish for "experiences" or "life experiences") is the title of an autobiography and biography written by the Colombian writer María Luisa Piraquive de Moreno that was published in 2001 (first edition) and 2007 (second and revised edition).

== Description ==
It has a hard cover with a gray hue and in an image of flowers along with the title, author's name, and the logo of the Church of God Ministry of Jesus Christ International. The book is printed in Colombia. The title and author names are printed on the back while there is a description on the back. The font on the cover and the edge of the pages are in gold print. In the beginning there is a prologue written by Carlos Alberto Baena.
