= Vivencia =

Vivencia (experience) may refer to:

- Vivencias (Ana Gabriel album), 1996
- Vivencia (band)
- Vivencias (book), 2001 María Luisa Piraquive
- Vivencias (Yolandita Monge album), 1988
- Vivencias (Marcos Witt album), 2001
- Vivencias (Humberto Nivi song), 1992
