= Jorge Muñoz (Colombian politician) =

Colombian-American social worker

Jorge Muñoz Zapata
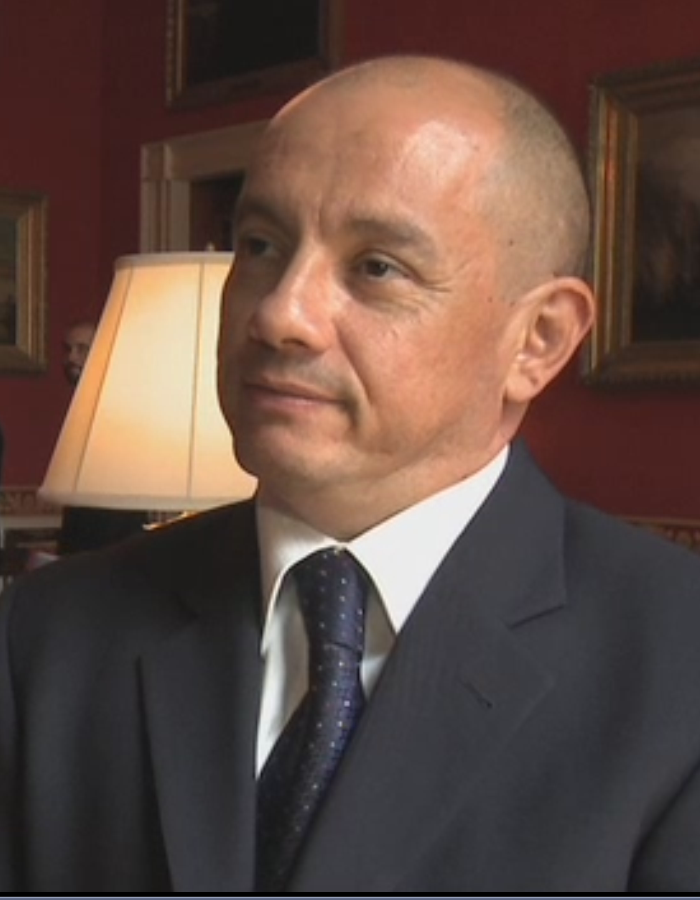

Member of the Chamber of Representatives of Colombia
- In office 21 September 2015 – 21 December 2015
- Constituency: Colombian expatriates

Personal details
- Born: 23 March 1964 (age 62) Palmira, Valle del Cauca, Colombia
- Party: Independent Movement of Absolute Renovation
- Parent: Blanca Doris Zapata
- Relatives: Luz Helena Muñoz Zapata (sister) Justin Schipe (nephew)
- Occupation: School bus driver, philanthropist and politician
- Awards: CNN Hero 2009; Presidential Citizens Medal 2010

Jorge Muñoz Zapata (born 23 March 1964) is a Colombian American philanthropist and politician. He is the founder of the non-profit An Angel in Queens Foundation, an organization that delivers free home-cooked meals in Queens, New York. Back in 2009, he estimated having served more than 70,000 meals to hungry people since 2004.

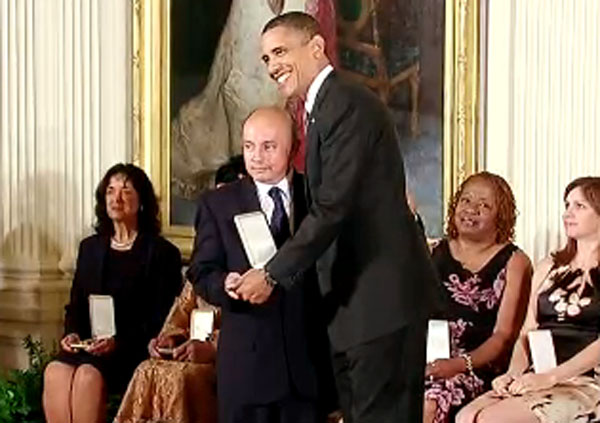
Jorge Muñoz receiving the Citizens Medal from Barack Obama.

Muñoz was awarded as one of the CNN Heroes in 2009 due to his philiantropic labour. On August 4, 2010, Muñoz was presented with the Presidential Citizens Medal by President Barack Obama, the second highest civilian honor in the United States. Moreover, Muñoz was presented the Order of the Congress of Colombia in the Degree of Knight by the Senate of Colombia.

== Philanthropy ==
Muñoz has been called a real life angel due to his commitment to help others by daily cooking and offering free hot meals to hungry people in Queens, New York. In 2004, Muñoz began his philanthropic labour, when he realized that large amounts of food were thrown away at some places. Initially, he collected food from local businesses and handed out meals to underprivileged people three nights a week. As time passed by, his mother and sister, and some friends, joined him in this endeavor, and then he could start to offer food on a daily basis. Muñoz invests a large part of his salary to support his philanthropic activities, and sometimes receives donations from third parties.

In 2006, Muñoz directed his efforts into the creation of the An Angel in Queens Foundation, a non-profit institution that targets the problem of hunger in the less privileged in the city of New York.

=== Recognition ===
Muñoz himself acknowledges that his altruistic activities became of public knowledge after his story was published by the New York Times. Afterwards, the exposure of his philanthropic work allowed him to be one of the recipients of the CNN heroes tribute, as he classified in the Top 10 heroes of 2009. Later on, in 2010, people in the United States nominated him, along with other 6000 nominees, to be the recipient of the Presidential Citizens Medal. He was awarded one of the 13 medals. In 2012, Muñoz was presented the Order of the Congress of Colombia in the Degree of Knight by the Senate of Colombia, as a recognition of his philanthropic efforts to help the Latin immigrants of New York City. In the same year, Muñoz was acknowledged as one of the 100 most outstanding Colombian expatriates by Marca Colombia and Fusionarte, during a ceremony held at the Casa de Nariño, in company of the President Juan Manuel Santos. Muñoz has received, among other acknowledgments and distinctions, the distinction for being an exemplary human being due to his outstanding moral values by the Assembly of the Valle del Cauca Department, and the decoration for his humanitarian labour in the United States and the bestowing with the Freedom of the city by the Mayorship and the City Council of Manizales.

== Political career ==
Jorge Muñoz was candidate of the Independent Movement of Absolute Renovation to the Chamber of Representatives of Colombia in 2010, when he ran for Representative of the Colombian expatriates. He obtained second place in the elections thanks to 8.197 votes. Muñoz was once again running for Representative of the Colombian expatriates for the 2014 Colombian parliamentary election, but that time he was the leader of the list of candidates of the MIRA movement to the Chamber of representatives for the Colombian expatriates constituency.

Jorge Muñoz was appointed temporary Congressman from September to December 2015 in replacement of Congresswoman Ana Paola Agudelo García.

== Personal life ==
Muñoz was born in Colombia to a humble family. When he was in his late teens, his father died in an accident and due to a difficult economic situation, his mother traveled to New York in search for a better future. Muñoz followed his mother, moving to New York to find work to support the family, obtaining legal residency in 1987, and later becoming a citizen, along with his mother and sister. Muñoz works as a school bus driver. Muñoz is a member of the Church of God Ministry of Jesus Christ International.
