= 2011 Cundinamarca Assembly election =

== Results ==
← Summary of the 30 October 2011 Cundinamarca Assembly election results. →
Party	Vote			Seats	
Party	Votes	%	±bp	Won	+/−
"U" Party (U)	182.144	21,27	▲693	5	▲4
Colombian Liberal Party (L)	130.117	15,19	▼268	3	±0
Colombian Conservative Party (C)	126.062	14,72	▼381	3	±0
Radical Change Party (CR)	110.977	12,96	▼328	3	±0
Green Party (Colombia) (VERDE)	50.725	5,92	▲479	1	▲1
Civic Option (PIN)	42.041	4,91	New	1	▲1
Independent Movement of Absolute Renovation (MIRA)	26.529	3,10	▲83	0	±0
Alternative Democratic Pole (POLO)	22.887	2,67	▼231	0	±0
MIO Party	9.788	1,14	New	0	±0
Indigenous Social Alliance Movement (ASI)	8.429	0,98	New	0	±0

Parties with less than 1% of the vote	0	-	-	-	-

Blank ballots	146.702	17,13	▲26		
Total	856.401	100,00		16	±0
Valid votes	856.401	83,84	▲80		
Invalid votes	45.070	4,41	▼108		
Unmarked votes	119.950	11,74	▲28		
Votes cast / turnout	1.021.421	64,81	▼157		
Abstentions	554.688	35,19	▲157		
Registered voters	1.576.109	▲12,31%			
Source: RNEC

Vote share
U	21.27%
L	15.19%
C	14.72%
CR	12.96%
VERDE	5.92%
PIN	4.91%
MIRA	3.10%
POLO	2.67%
MIO	1.14%
ASI	0.98%
Blank votes	17.13%

Department Assembly seats
U	31%
L	19%
C	19%
CR	19%
VERDE	6%
PIN	6%
