= 2018 Colombian parliamentary election =

- 11 March 2018
- Chamber of Representatives
- 170 of the 171 seats in the Chamber of Representatives
- Turnout: 47.25% (▲4.26pp)
Party	Leader	Vote %	Seats	+/–
Liberal	Lidio García Turbay	16.53	35	−4
Democratic Centre	Álvaro Uribe	16.08	32	+13
Radical Change	Arturo Char Chaljub	14.47	30	+14
Party of the U	Roy Barreras	12.33	25	−12
Conservative	David Barguil	12.18	21	−6
Green Alliance	Antanas Mockus	5.95	9	+3
MIRA	Ana Agudelo	3.90	1	−2
PDA	Jorge Enrique Robledo	2.96	2	−1
OC		2.08	2	−4
List of Decency		1.76	2	+2
CJL	Gustavo Bolívar	1.29	1	New
AV–PDA–ASI		0.48	1	New
MAIS		0.30	1	+1
FARC		0.23	5	New
Afro-Colombian seats
CCADCNPR		8.12	1	New
CCLM		6.40	1	New
Indigenous seat
MAIS		25.68	1	+1
This lists parties that won seats. See the complete results below.
Results of the election in the Chamber of Representatives and Senate (bottom left).
- Senate
- 107 of the 108 seats in the Senate
- Turnout: 47.99% (▲5.00pp)
Party	Vote %	Seats	+/–
Democratic Centre	16.39	19	−1
Radical Change	14.03	16	+7
Conservative	12.65	14	−4
Liberal	12.36	14	−3
Party of the U	12.08	14	−7
Green Alliance	8.57	9	+4
PDA	4.74	5	0
List of Decency	3.40	3	+3
MIRA	3.25	3	+3
CJL	3.04	3	New
FARC	0.36	5	New
Indigenous seats
MAIS	14.63	1	0
AICO	7.64	1	+1
This lists parties that won seats. See the complete results below.

Congressional elections were held in Colombia on 11 March 2018 to elect 102 members of the Senate and 165 members of the House of Representatives.

== Electoral system ==
The Chamber of Representatives consisted of 172 members; 162 were elected by proportional representation from 33 multi-member constituencies based on the departments, with seats allocated using the largest remainder method. Two members were elected by the Afro-Colombian community and one by the indigenous community. Although a new constituency had been created for the Raizal minority, legislation had not been approved to allow the election to take place. A further five seats were reserved for FARC and one for the running mate of the runner-up in the presidential election as part of the Colombian peace process.

The Senate consisted of 108 members; 100 were elected a single nationwide constituency by proportional representation (with seats allocated using the largest remainder); two were elected from a two-seat constituency for indigenous Colombians; five were reserved for FARC and one for the runner-up in the presidential election.

== Candidates ==
1. Green Alliance
2. National Integration Party
3. Colombian Conservative Party
4. Democratic Center
5. Movimiento Todos Somos Colombia
6. Radical Change
7. Colombian Liberal Party
8. Grupo Significativo de Ciudadanos Colombia Justa Libres
9. Grupo Significativo de Ciudadanos Unión con Fortaleza
10. Alternative Democratic Pole
11. Social Party of National Unity
12. Common Alternative Revolutionary Force
13. Grupo Significativo de Ciudadanos Sí Se Puede
14. Independent Movement of Absolute Renovation
15. Partido Somos Región Colombia
16. La Lista de la Decencia (Indigenous Social Alliance Movement, Unión Patriótica and Indigenous and Social Alternative Movement)

== Opinion polls ==
Voting intention for Senate
Date(s) conducted	Polling organisation/client	Sample size	Party													None	Blank vote	Don't know/ No response	Margin of error
Date(s) conducted	Polling organisation/client	Sample size	U	CD	PCC	PLC	CR	PV	PDA	OC	MIRA	Prog	FARC	UP	Others	None	Blank vote	Don't know/ No response	Margin of error
2014 Senate election results			19.11%	17.52%	16.66%	14.98%	8.54%	4.84%	4.64%	4.52%	2.80%	—	—	—	—				
23–26 Nov 2017	Cifras y Conceptos/ Red+ Noticias & Caracol Radio	1795	6%	14%	5%	12%	9%	5%	3%	2%	5%	1%	1%	0%	3%	25%	1%	6%	4.5%
11–14 Dec 2017	Guarumo & EcoAnalítica/ El Tiempo & W Radio	2352	4.8%	14.2%	3.9%	9.5%	4.0%	7.0%	3.3%	0.8%	2.0%	—	1.0%	—	2.6%	—	27.3%	19.6%	4%
24–28 Jan 2018	Cifras y Conceptos/ Red+ Noticias & Caracol Radio	2813	5%	15%	6%	14%	10%	5%	2%	1%	2%	1%	1%	1%	3%	24%	2%	8%	4.6%
24–28 Jan 2018	YanHaas/RCN Televisión, RCN Radio, La F.M. Radio & various newspapers	1251	7%	11%	8%	15%	7%	6%	6%	2%	—	—	1%	—	—	19%	18%	—	2.2%
27–31 Jan 2018	Guarumo & EcoAnalítica/ El Tiempo & W Radio	2187	5.2%	15.6%	3.5%	8.5%	6.0%	8.7%	5.3%	1.3%	1.8%	—	1.2%	—	3.6%	—	23.4%	15.9%	4%
23–26 Feb 2018	Cifras y Conceptos/ Red+ Noticias & Caracol Radio	2960	5%	17%	6%	12%	10%	4%	5%	3%	3%	—	0%	—	35%	—	—	—	4.5%
24 Feb–1 Mar 2018	Guarumo & EcoAnalítica/ El Tiempo & W Radio	3425	4.8%	20.1%	5.0%	9.9%	8.1%	6.1%	4.0%	1.8%	1.5%	—	0.6%	—	7.3%	—	16.1%	14.7%	2.7%

== Results ==
=== Senate ===
Party	Votes	%	Seats
Democratic Center	2,501,995	16.39	19
Radical Change	2,142,040	14.03	16
Colombian Conservative Party	1,931,140	12.65	14
Colombian Liberal Party	1,886,895	12.36	14
Social Party of National Unity	1,844,847	12.08	14
Green Alliance	1,308,208	8.57	9
Alternative Democratic Pole	722,987	4.74	5
List of Decency Coalition (ASI–UP–MAIS)	519,262	3.40	3
Independent Movement of Absolute Renovation	495,506	3.25	3
Colombia Justa Libres	463,521	3.04	3
Citizen Option	346,398	2.27	0
Partido Somos	102,969	0.67	0
Todos Somos Colombia	57,465	0.38	0
Common Alternative Revolutionary Force	55,400	0.36	5
Union for Fortaleza	34,275	0.22	0
Si Se Puede	13,196	0.09	0
Presidential election runner-up			1
Blank votes	841,212	5.51	–
Total	15,267,316	100.00	106
Valid votes	15,267,316	88.31	
Invalid votes	2,021,188	11.69	
Total votes	17,288,504	100.00	
Registered voters/turnout	36,025,318	47.99	
Indigenous seats
Indigenous and Social Alternative Movement	74,023	14.63	1
Indigenous Authorities of Colombia	38,633	7.64	1
Independent Social Alliance Movement	23,372	4.62	0
Political Sovereignty Movement	15,927	3.15	0
Casiyouren Traditional Authority	4,961	0.98	0
Ethnic Renovation of Colombia	4,567	0.90	0
Indigenous Environmental Movement	2,254	0.45	0
Blank votes	342,080	67.63	–
Total	505,817	100.00	2
Source: El Mundo, MOE

=== Chamber of Representatives ===
Party	Votes	%	Seats
Colombian Liberal Party	2,447,298	16.53	35
Democratic Center	2,380,290	16.08	32
Radical Change	2,141,108	14.47	30
Social Party of National Unity	1,824,570	12.33	25
Colombian Conservative Party	1,802,894	12.18	21
Green Alliance	880,354	5.95	9
Independent Movement of Absolute Renovation	576,998	3.90	1
Alternative Democratic Pole	438,283	2.96	2
Citizen Option	307,478	2.08	2
List of Decency Coalition (ASI–UP–MAIS)	260,712	1.76	2
Colombia Justa Libres	191,109	1.29	1
AV–PDA	173,706	1.17	0
Partido Somos	159,967	1.08	0
Independent Social Alliance Movement	109,258	0.74	0
Alternative Santandereana Coalition (AV–PDA–ASI)	70,502	0.48	1
List of Decency Coalition (UP–MAIS)	48,318	0.33	0
Indigenous and Social Alternative Movement	43,776	0.30	1
Patriotic Union	42,114	0.28	0
Common Alternative Revolutionary Force	33,951	0.23	5
AV–PDA–UP	17,732	0.12	0
Todos Somos Colombia	16,271	0.11	0
Indigenous Authorities of Colombia	11,082	0.07	0
ASI–AV–UP	4,902	0.03	0
Regional Integration Movement	3,123	0.02	0
Vice-presidential runner-up			1
Vacant (Note: The Raizal seat was not filled.)			1
Blank votes	815,502	5.51	–
Total	14,801,298	100.00	169
Valid votes	14,801,298	86.95	
Invalid votes	2,222,411	13.05	
Total votes	17,023,709	100.00	
Registered voters/turnout	36,025,318	47.25	
Afro-Colombian seats
C.C. Ancestral De Comunidades Negras Playa Renaciente	32,243	8.12	1
Consejo Comunitario La Mamuncia	25,428	6.40	1
C.C. De La Comunidad Negra De La Plata Bahía Málaga	17,477	4.40	0
Consejo Comunitario Del Rio Yurumangui	14,048	3.54	0
C.C. De Comun. Negras Palenque Vda. Las Trescientas Y Mun. Galapa	13,122	3.30	0
Consejo Comunitario Mayor De Certegui	11,340	2.86	0
Consejo Comunitario De Alejandro Duran Diaz	8,604	2.17	0
Todos Somos Colombia	7,578	1.91	0
Corporación Poder Ciudadano	7,048	1.78	0
Consejo Comunitario Renacer Negro	6,414	1.62	0
Consejo Comunitario Bocas Del Atrato Y Leoncito	4,219	1.06	0
Consejo Comunitario Ma Kankamana De San Basilio De Palenque	4,179	1.05	0
C.C. De La Comunidad Negra De La Calle Larga Rio Dagua	3,539	0.89	0
C.C. De Los Corregimientos De San Antonio Y El Castillo	3,437	0.87	0
Consejo Comunitario Los Andes	3,391	0.85	0
C. C. De La Comun. Negra De Tierra Baja Mi Territorio Ancestral	3,325	0.84	0
Consejo Comunitario Veredas Unidas Un Bien Común	3,201	0.81	0
Consejo Comunitario Imbilpi Del Carmen	2,711	0.68	0
Consejo Comunitario De La Comunidad Negra De Limones	2,618	0.66	0
Consejo Comunitario Tablon Salado	2,225	0.56	0
Fund. Afrocolombiana Liberal De Desarrollo Social (Afrocodes)	2,162	0.54	0
Kusuto Magende Cokumalu De Luruaco	2,136	0.54	0
Consejo Comunitario De Las Baras	1,989	0.50	0
Consejo Comunitario De Comunidades Negras Obatala	1,766	0.44	0
Cuenca Del Rio Iscuande	1,667	0.42	0
Org. Social De Comunidades Negras "Nelson Mandela"	1,619	0.41	0
Consejo Comunitario De Comunidades Negras Santo Domingo	1,505	0.38	0
C.C. General Del Río Baudó Y Sus Afluentes "Acaba"	1,428	0.36	0
Blank votes	206,635	52.04	–
Total	397,054	100.00	2
Indigenous seat
Indigenous and Social Alternative Movement	99,182	25.68	1
Indigenous Authorities of Colombia	45,358	11.75	0
ANICOL	4,409	1.14	0
UAIZSACOR	4,156	1.08	0
Taita Zipa Foundation	2,610	0.68	0
Casiyouren Traditional Authority	1,946	0.50	0
Blank votes	228,488	59.17	–
Total	386,149	100.00	1
Source: MOE, MOE
