= Manuel Antonio Virgüez =

Colombian lawyer and politician (born 1969)

Manuel Virgüez
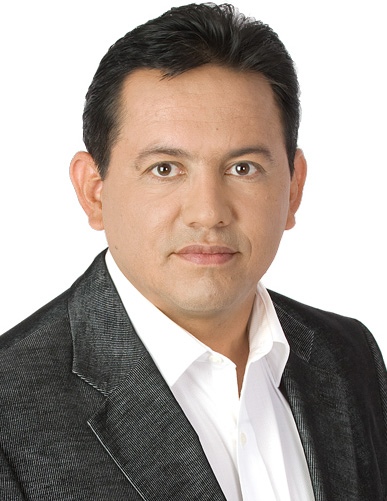
- Virgüez in 2010

Vice President of the Senate
- Incumbent
- Assumed office 20 July 2026 Serving with Alejandro Ocampo
- President: Honorio Henríquez
- Preceded by: Ana Paola Agudelo

Senator of Colombia
- In office 20 July 2006 – 20 June 2014

Personal details
- Born: Manuel Antonio Virgüez Piraquive; 10 May 1969 (age 57) Bogotá, D.C., Colombia
- Party: Independent Movement of Absolute Renovation (2010-present)
- Education: Universidad del Norte (BBL)
- Website: www.manuelvirguez.com

Military service
- Allegiance: Colombia
- Branch/service: Colombian Navy
- Years of service: 1987-2004
- Rank: Non-commissioned officer
- Battles/wars: Colombian conflict (1964–present)

Manuel Antonio Virgüez Piraquive (born 10 May 1969) is a Colombian lawyer and politician, who served as Senator of Colombia as member of the MIRA party from 2006 to 2014.

== Career ==
Virgüez attended Rafael Núñez University in Cartagena, where he graduated in Law. He completed post-graduate studies in Negotiations and Conflict Management from Universidad del Norte in Barranquilla, and in Political Studies at Sergio Arboleda University in Bogotá.

He joined the Colombian Navy where he served as a non-commissioned naval diver for 18 years.

Virgüez was Caribbean region coordinator of the MIRA party. In the 2006 parliamentary elections, as the second-in-line of the closed-electoral list of the MIRA party, headed by Senator Alexandra Moreno Piraquive. The party received 237,512 votes, which earned them both seats in the Senate. During the second semester of 2008, he was elected Chair of the Fourth Commission of the Senate.

Virgüez was re-elected in the 2010 parliamentary elections, as the second-in-line of the closed-electoral list of the MIRA party, headed by Senator Moreno. The party received 324,109 votes in the parliamentary elections, which earned them three seats in the Senate, Virgüez taking one of these.

=== Political positions ===
Virgüez has been a strong supporter of the military, and has presented several bills related to the military service and the social and economic order.
