= Ana María Castañeda =

Colombian politician (born 1984)

Ana Maria Castañeda
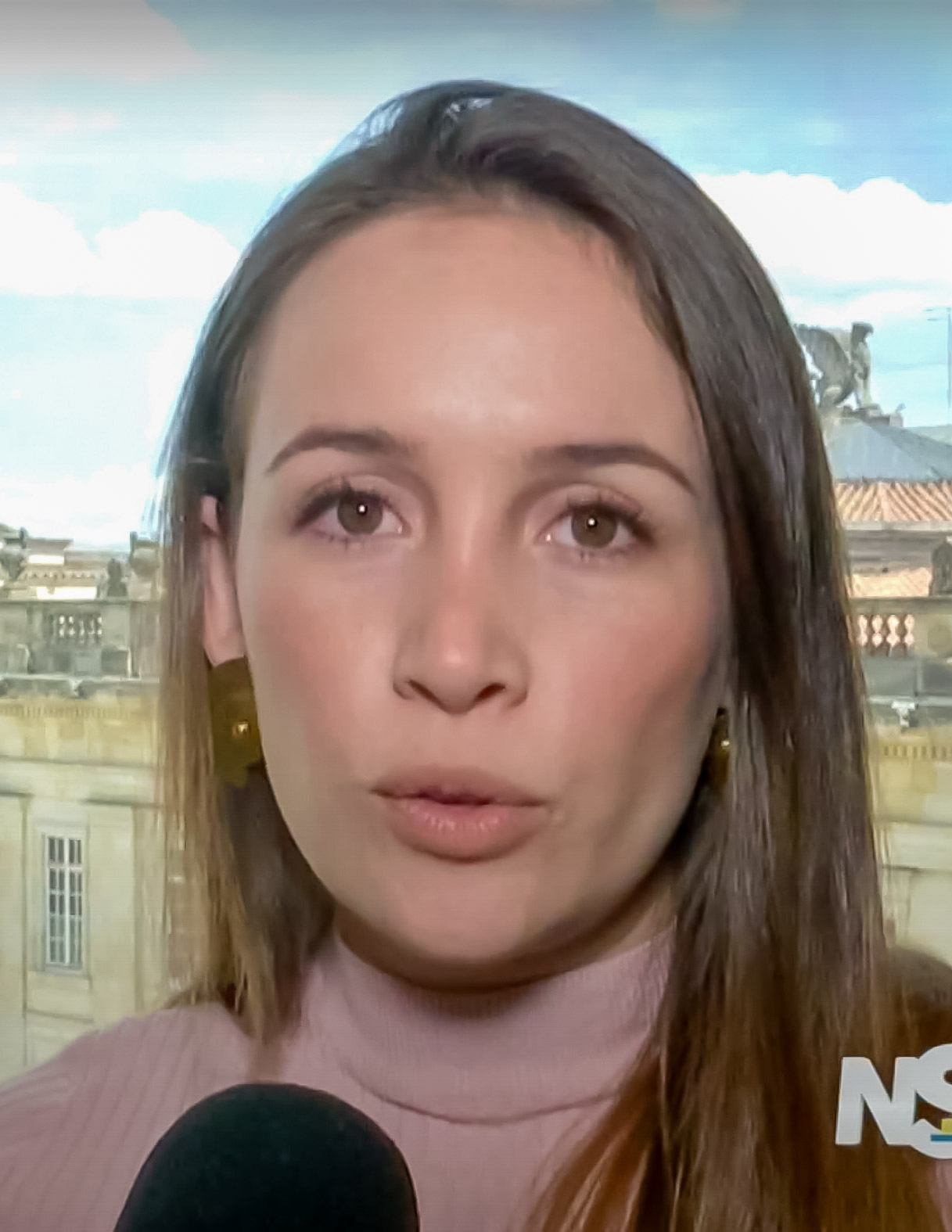

Vice President of the Senate
- In office 20 July 2025 – 20 July 2026 Serving with Ana Paola Agudelo
- President: Lidio García
- Preceded by: Alirio Barrera
- Succeeded by: Alejandro Ocampo

Senator of Colombia
- Incumbent
- Assumed office 20 July 2018

Personal details
- Born: Ana María Castañeda Gómez; 27 December 1984 (age 41) Sincelejo, Sucre, Colombia
- Party: Radical Change (2018-present)
- Spouse: Mario Fernández Alcocer
- Children: 2
- Education: Caribbean University Corporation, Pontificia Universidad Javeriana
- Occupation: Business Administrator, Politician

Ana María Castañeda Gómez (born 27 December 1984) is a Colombian politician, who serves as Senator.

== Early life and career ==
Castañeda studied Business Administration at the Corporación Universitaria del Caribe, an institution where she also specialized in Public Management. she obtained a postgraduate degree in Government and Territorial Public Management from the Pontifical Xavierian University.

She represented Sucre in the 2005 National Beauty Contest, in which she was elected third princess. She was appointed social manager of the Mayor's Office of Sincelejo between 2012 and 2015. She led the structuring of the Public Policy for Children, Youth and Adolescents of Sincelejo. She was the host of the 20 January festivities in Sincelejo as Central Queen, and advisor of the festivities between 2008 and 2011.

In the 2018 elections, at just 33 years old, she was elected as a senator for the Radical Change Party, by obtaining 55,792 votes.

In the Senate, she is part of Commission VI, which she chaired between 2018 and 2019. She was one of the main proponents of the bill that established gender parity, 50%, mandatory in electoral lists for public corporations. She is the wife of Mario Alberto Fernández Alcocer, also a politician.
