= Mario Fernández Alcocer =

Colombian politician (born 1979)

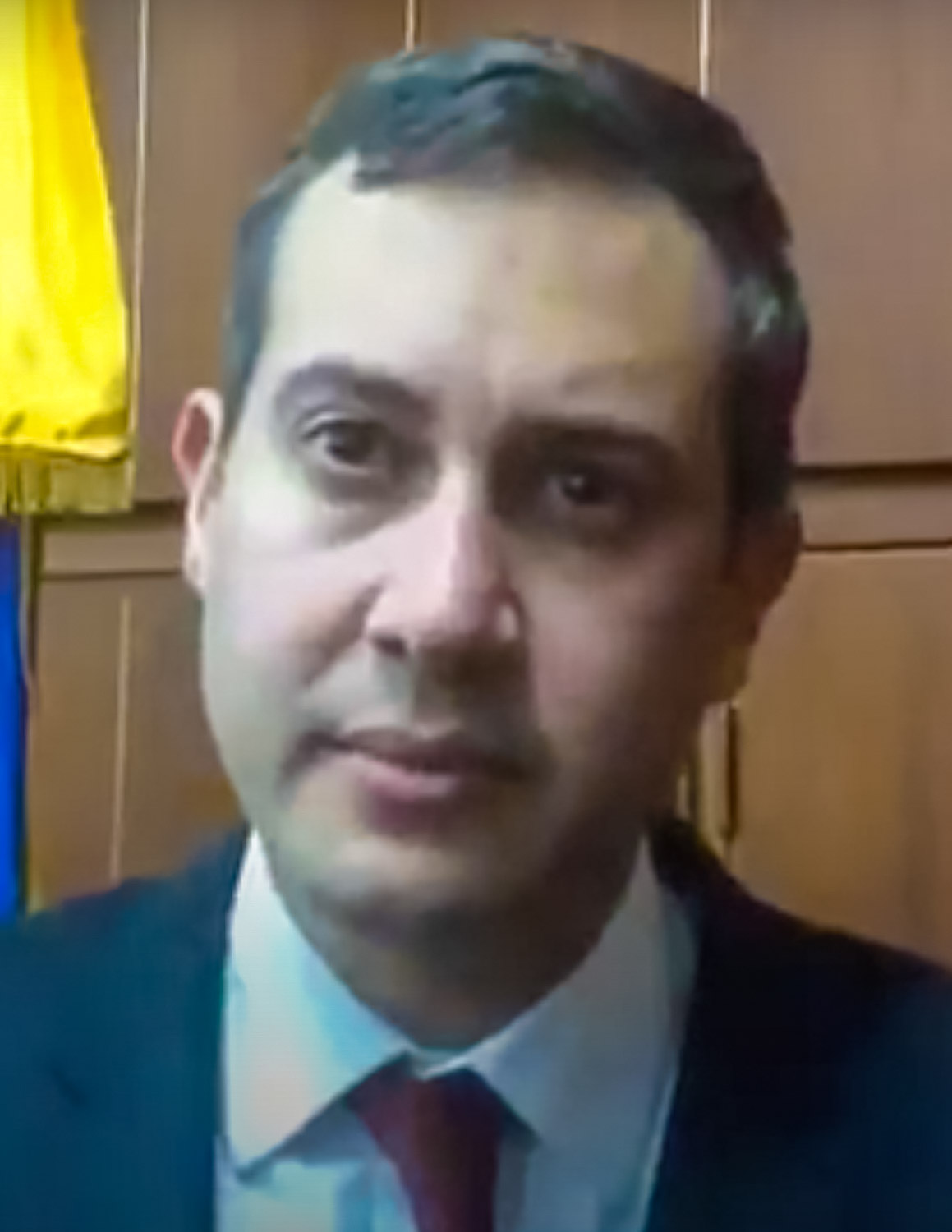

Senator of Colombia
- In office July 20, 2014 – July 20, 2018

Personal details
- Born: Mario Alberto Fernández Alcocer; May 23, 1979 (age 47) Sincelejo, Sucre, Colombia
- Party: Liberal
- Spouse: Ana María Castañeda
- Children: 2
- Relatives: Verónica Alcocer (cousin)
- Education: Universidad Externado de Colombia
- Website: Mario Fernández Alcocer website

Mario Alberto Fernández Alcocer (born May 23, 1979) is a Colombian politician and lawyer, formerly a member of the Liberal Party.

Fernández Alcocer has served as Congressman, serving as Senator of Colombia between July 20, 2014, to July 20, 2018.
