= Alirio Barrera =

Colombian politician (born 1976)

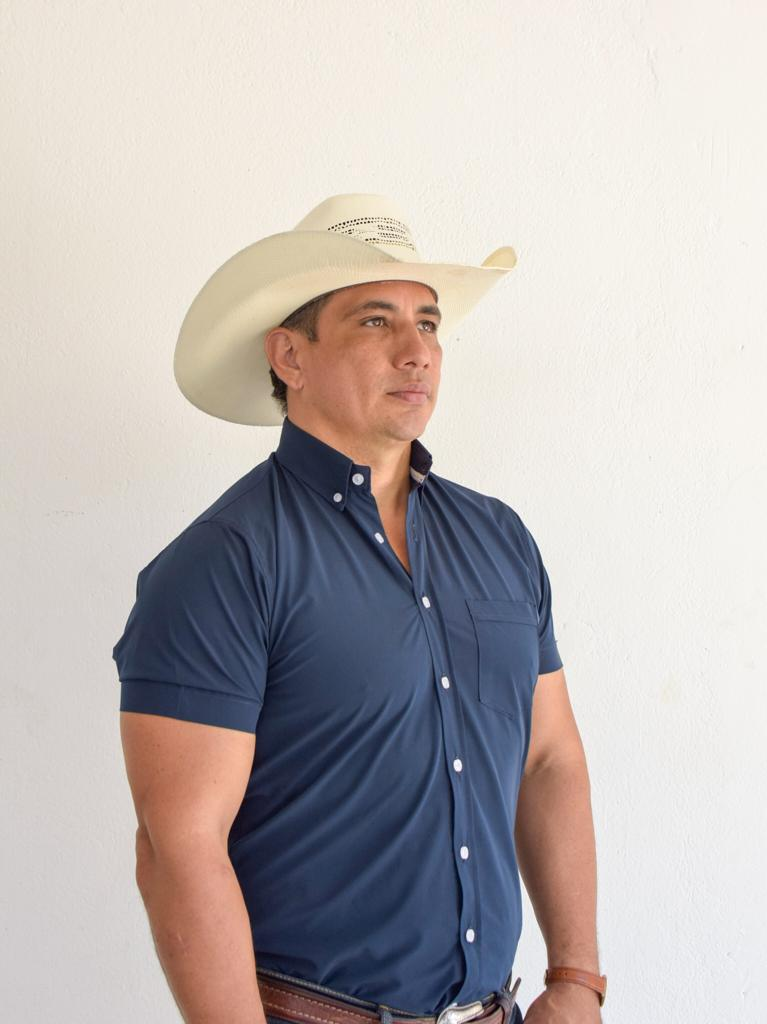
- Barrera in 2022

Vice President of the Senate
- In office 20 July 2024 – 20 July 2025 Serving with Jhon Jairo Roldán
- President: Efraín Cepeda
- Preceded by: Didier Lobo
- Succeeded by: Ana María Castañeda

Senator of Colombia
- Incumbent
- Assumed office 20 July 2022

Governor of Casanare
- In office 1 January 2016 – 13 October 2019
- Preceded by: Marco Tulio Ruiz
- Succeeded by: Salomón Andrés Sanabria

Personal details
- Born: 10 November 1976 (age 49)
- Party: Democratic Centre
- Relatives: Salomón Andrés Sanabria (brother-in-law)

Josué Alirio Barrera Rodríguez (born 10 November 1976) is a Colombian politician serving as a member of the Senate since 2022. From 2016 to 2019, he served as governor of Casanare.
