= Carlos Alberto Baena =

Colombian lawyer and politician

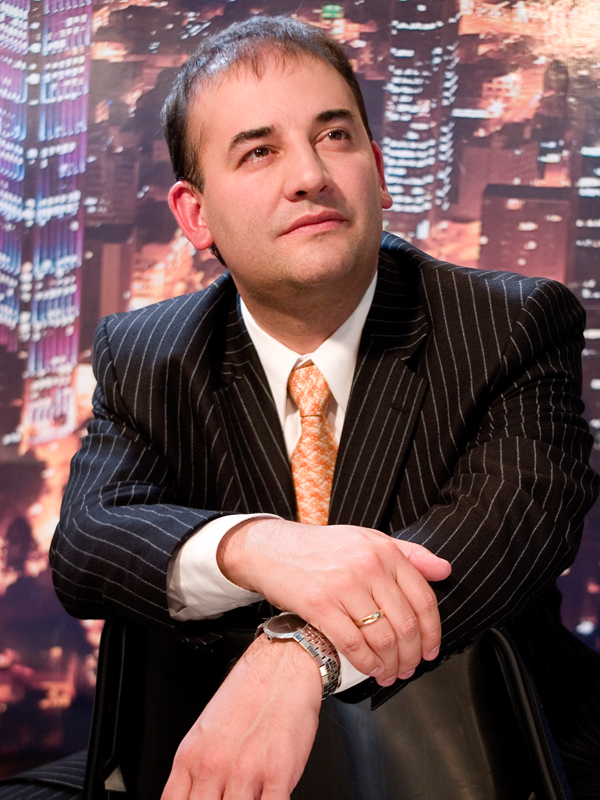

Vice Minister for Participation and Equal Rights
- In office 12 March 2020 – 7 August 2022
- President: Iván Duque
- Minister: Nancy Gutiérrez; Alicia Arango; Daniel Palacio
- Preceded by: Juan Carlos Soler
- Succeeded by: Liliana Solano

Vice Minister for Labor Relations and Inspection
- In office 13 August 2018 – 12 March 2020
- President: Iván Duque
- Minister: Alicia Arango; Ángel Cabrera
- Preceded by: María Eugenia Aparicio
- Succeeded by: Ligia Chaves

Senator of Colombia
- In office 14 March 2018 – 20 July 2018
- In office 20 July 2010 – 20 July 2014

Councillor of Bogotá
- In office 1 January 2001 – 29 July 2009

Personal details
- Born: Carlos Alberto Baena López; 12 November 1967 (age 58) Armenia, Quindío, Colombia
- Party: Independent Movement of Absolute Renovation
- Education: Universidad Externado de Colombia
- Profession: Lawyer
- Website: carlosalbertobaena.com/acerca-de/

Carlos Alberto Baena López (born 12 November 1967) is a Colombian lawyer and politician, who serves, since 2020, as Vice Minister for Participation and Equality of Rights of the Ministry of the Interior of Colombia. He served as Senator of Colombia from 2010 to 2014. Baena is a co-founder of the Independent Movement of Absolute Renovation (MIRA) and has served two terms as Party Chairman. Before ascending to Congress, Baena served as Councillor of the Bogotá City Council from 2001 to 2009.

Baena also serves as the General Preacher in the Church of God Ministry of Jesus Christ International.

== Biography ==
Carlos Alberto was born on 12 November 1967 in Armenia, Quindío, to Alberto Baena and Gladys López. He is married to Lydia Raquel Hernández Corredor with whom he has four daughters. He attended Universidad Externado de Colombia where he graduated in Law and completed a specialization in Tax Management. He later attended University of the Andes where he obtained a Master of Public Administration, and completed further programs in Negotiation and High Government Studies.

== Political career ==
In 2000, Baena co-founded the Independent Movement of Absolute Renovation (MIRA); that same year he was elected as Party Chair serving until 2003. In 2001, Baena was elected to the Bogotá City Council of Bogotá for the first time, as member of the MIRA party. He was consecutively re-elected twice as Councillor in 2004, and in 2008. During his time in office, Baena was acknowledged five times as the best City Councillor by the political watchdog group Bogotá Cómo Vamos.

In 2010, Baena ran for a seat in the Senate of Colombia as the third-in-line of the closed-electoral list of the MIRA party, headed by Senator Alexandra Moreno Piraquive. The party received 324,109 votes in the parliamentary elections, which gave them three seats in the Senate, Baena taking one of these.

=== Political positions ===
Baena proposed and promoted a bill, that ultimately became law, that penalizes every form of discrimination, included discrimination on the basis of sexual orientation.

He is supportive of the decriminalization of psychoactive drugs consumption, and the creation of supervised injection sites and harm reduction policies, in order to offer medical assistance to substance dependent-individuals.

=== Recognition ===
Baena was acknowledged several times as the best Bogotá City Councillor by the political watchdog group Bogotá Cómo Vamos. He received this acknowledgment for the first time during the first semester of 2005 and later on, four times consecutively from 2006 to 2007. In 2006, his Bogotá City Council colleagues chose him as one of the three best Councillors of Bogotá. In the first semester of 2008 and in 2009, Baena and his party colleague, Councillor Humberto Quijano, were acknowledged as the best political coalition in the Bogotá City Council.

In 2011, while serving as Senator, he was acknowledged by the Bogotá City Council as one of the most representative leaders who have been part of the Council of Bogotá. In 2012 he was declared Honorary Citizen of Quibdó by Mayor Zulia Mena García for his work in Congress towards protecting the rights of Afro-Colombians.

On June 26, 2022, he was awarded the Luis Carlos Galan Sarmiento Medal of Merit, for his contributions to human rights, democracy and civic participation.

== Controversy ==
Carlos Alberto Baena, promoter of the Law 1482 of 2011 by which punitive measures are set against racism and discrimination appeared on a video in which Maria Luisa Piraquive, cofounder of the Church of God Ministry of Jesus Christ International, was seen stating that people with physical disabilities cannot preach from the pulpit of the church because of "what the people may say" and "aesthetic reasons", reasons that, according to her, may cause a negative impact on the faith of newcomers to the church. However, it was found that the controversial video was the pivotal point of a powerful smear campaign, in which there was participation of other political parties and, directly or indirectly, participation of the Office of the Attorney General of Colombia. Such smear campaign directly impacted the MIRA party, and it became apparent that the objective was Baena´s party, since the video was filmed more than 8 years before it was released by media during the 2014 incidents, precisely two months prior the 2014 Colombian parliamentary election. In addition, in the complete video Maria Luisa states that anyone can preach in the church if God tells them to do so.

As a result of this media attack to Baena´s party, it became publicly known that Dora Landázuri, one of the MIRA party´s candidates to the 2014 Colombian parliamentary elections, is a physically disabled African-Colombian woman, which left no ground for accusations against Baena or his party on the basis of discrimination towards physically disabled people.

== Selected works ==
- Vallejo Rosero, María del Carmen; Baena López, Carlos Alberto (2007). Toxicología Ambiental: Efectos de los contaminantes en la salud humana (in Spanish). Bogotá: Grupo Empresarial Wills. ISBN 9789589825907.
