= María Luisa Piraquive =

Colombian neo-pentecostal leader

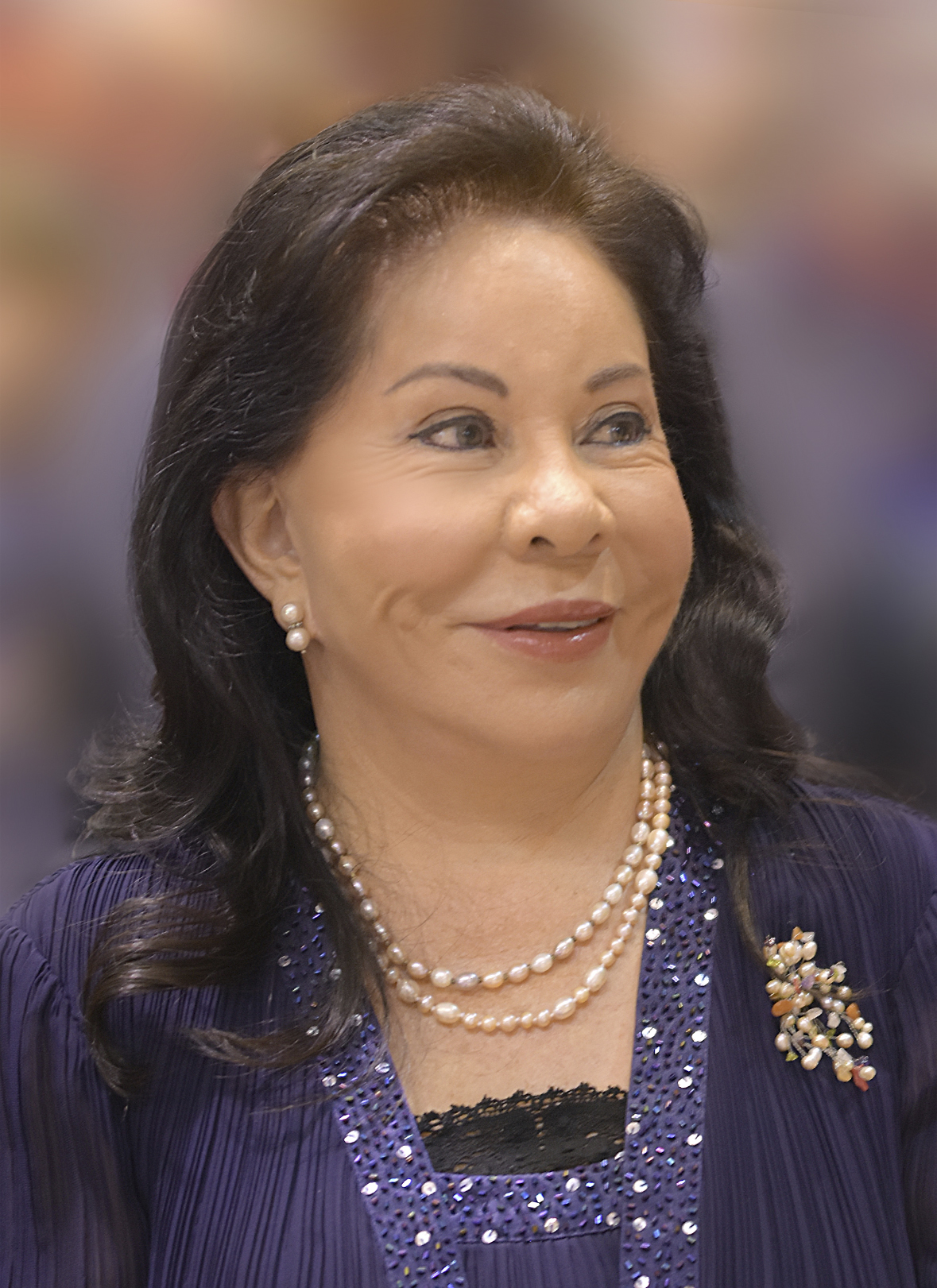
- Piraquive in 2018
- Born: February 10, 1949 (age 77); Chipatá, Santander, Colombia
- Education: University of La Sabana, Free University of Colombia, Pontificia Universidad Javeriana (BA); European Institute Stellae Campus (MA); Central University of Nicaragua (PhD)
- Occupations: Neo-pentecostal leader and benefactor
- Years active: 1971–present
- Organization(s): María Luisa de Moreno; International Foundation
- Title: Leader/Ministry of the Church of God Ministry of Jesus Christ International
- Term: 1996–present
- Predecessor: Luis Eduardo Moreno
- Political party: Republican
- Spouses: Luis Eduardo Moreno (m. 1966–1996) Humberto Romero Medina (m. 2006)
- Children: 5, including Alexandra
- Parent(s): Obdulio Piraquive and María Corredor
- Awards: Frida award
- Website: colombia.marialuisa.foundation/marialuisapiraquive/ marialuisapiraquive.com

María Luisa Piraquive Corredor (born February 10, 1949) is a Colombian–American educator, singer, philanthropist, and leader of the Church of God Ministry of Jesus Christ International.

Additionally, she is founder and president of a not-for-profit organization, Maria Luisa de Moreno International Foundation, which offers a broad range of social assistance services, and pioneer of the Colombian political party, MIRA.

Commonly known as Sister Maria Luisa, she has received three honorary doctorates and the Medal Order of Democracy Simon Bolivar, awarded by the House of Representatives of Colombia. She hosts online church services that are streamed live on YouTube with over 300,000 views per video, and her sermons are dubbed into 12 languages.

== Biography ==
=== Early life ===
Maria Luisa Piraquive was born on February 10, 1949, in Chipata, a town in southwestern Santander, Colombia. She was the third of ten children, six girls and four boys, and was raised in a Catholic home. Shortly after her birth, her parents moved to the town of Sachica, in the department of Boyaca, and, subsequently, to Bogota, where she worked making blankets. Piraquive shared that when she was seven years old she had a dream with the Lord Jesus Christ that changed her life. She met Luis Eduardo Moreno when she was 16 years old through her sister Beatriz Piraquive. He was pastor of a Pentecostal church called "Iglesia Pentecostal." She married him a year later.

=== Founding the Church of God Ministry of Jesus Christ International ===
In 1972, Maria Luisa Piraquive and her husband founded the Church of God Ministry of Jesus Christ International in Bogota. Five years later, the church opened its first location in Panama. Upon graduating with a bachelor's degree in linguistics and literature, she worked as a schoolteacher in the capital of Colombia. When Luis Eduardo Moreno died in 1996, Maria Luisa took on the leadership of the congregation, which included the spiritual roles as pastor, prophetess, and apostle to her followers, among other roles. With the policies that she implemented after taking leadership, the Church of God Ministry of Jesus Christ International experienced remarkable growth.

=== Founding the Maria Luisa de Moreno International Foundation ===
In 2000, Maria Luisa founded the Maria Luisa de Moreno International Foundation, a non-profit organization that offers social assistance services to vulnerable populations through the development and implementation of educational, productive, and humanitarian programs. The organization is present in numerous countries in Latin America, and the European Union as well as Canada, with over 50,000 volunteers.

=== Education ===
Maria Luisa Piraquive finished her elementary schooling in Sachica and her high school studies were conducted by radio at Colegio Normal Nacional in Bogota, where she also graduated as a schoolteacher in 1988. Subsequently, she pursued her long distance university studies and graduated in 1993 with a Bachelor in Linguistics and Literature from Universidad de La Sabana. In March 2000, she graduated with a degree in Educational Management from Universidad Libre. In November of that same year, and in partnership with the Office of the Mayor of Bogota, she graduated from Pontificia Universidad Javeriana with a degree in community development and social management. On June 29, 2016, she completed her threefold master's degree in international law, human rights, and international cooperation from the Instituto Europeo Campus Stellae in Santiago de Compostela, Spain, and won an award for the high-quality investigative work she performed.

On June 20, 2019, she received her Doctoral Degree in International law from Universidad Central de Nicaragua after completing her award-winning thesis titled "Method: Discover Abilities, an Opportunity" after five years of research at said Central American school.

== Publications ==
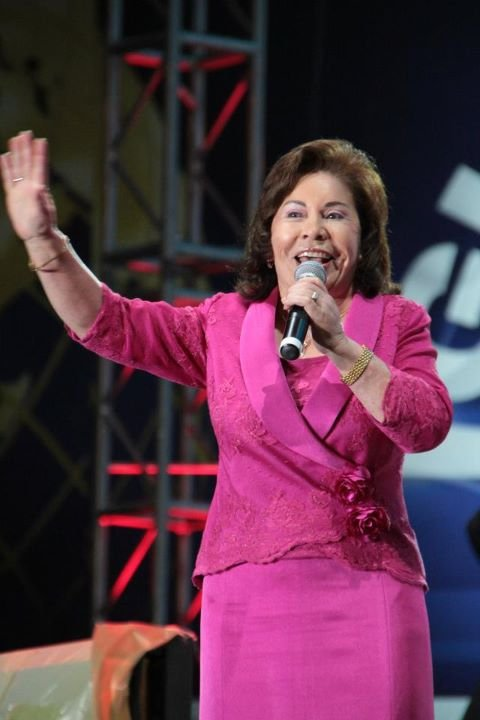
Maria Luisa Piraquive at the 40th-anniversary celebration of the founding of the Church of God Ministry of Jesus Christ International (IDMJI) in 2012

Maria Luisa Piraquive has compiled a book of Christian hymns and choruses. In 2001, she published her autobiography titled "Experiences," which was later relaunched in 2018 for Amazon Kindle and other digital platforms. She constantly records and publishes videos of the Christian gatherings she hosts, known as Bible Studies, which take place in the different countries where the Church of God Ministry of Jesus Christ International has locations. These videos are published on the Church's website and official YouTube channels and are projected and viewed weekly in all the Church's locations around the world. They can also be heard on various podcast platforms.The material is dubbed into several languages including English, Italian, Portuguese, French, German, Japanese, Swedish, Danish, Dutch, Polish, Russian, Albanian, and Vietnamese. In Spanish alone, her weekly sermons get over 300,000 views each week.

=== Singer ===
Since the Church of God Ministry of Jesus Christ was founded, Maria Luisa has sung the hymns and choruses that are played in the congregation. Additionally, these songs have been released as singles on CDs: 11 albums of hymns and five of choruses. Her music is also available on digital platforms such as iTunes, Google Play, Amazon Music, Spotify, Deezer, and her YouTube channel.

=== Address to the United Nations ===
On June 21, 2019, Maria Luisa Piraquive spoke before the UN in Geneva, Switzerland, to present her model of productive inclusion for people with disabilities that is already being implemented at the Maria Luisa de Moreno International Foundation. The model, which she developed and has implemented since 2012, is called "Discovering a Skill, an Opportunity."

== Personal life ==
She married pastor Luis Eduardo Moreno when she was 17 years old and they had the following children: Cesar Eduardo Moreno, worldwide administrator of the Church of God; Alexandra, Colombian Consul of Judicial Cooperation, Nationalization, and Titling in New York City; Perla, who created the medical foundation Mira Tu Salud; and Ivan Dario, who is president of a virtual university.

A decade after widowing, she married Mexican architect Humberto Romero Medina, with whom she lives in Florida, where she became a United States citizen.

== Recognitions and awards ==
María Luisa Piraquive had received several awards in Colombia and Latin-America.

=== Locally ===
Maria Luisa Piraquive was postulated in 2009 to receive the award The Exemplary Colombian (El Colombiano Ejemplar), in the personal solidarity category by the journal El Colombiano of Medellín. The Neiva´s Municipal Council granted her with the Recognition Award to Finest Personalities (Moción de Reconocimientos a los Ilustres Personajes).

=== Nationally ===
The Colombian Air Force gave Piraquive the award "Alas de Esperanza 2012" (Wings of Hope Award 2012), for the health brigades delivered through the ONG that has his name. In February 2012 the Chamber of Representatives of Colombia decorated her with the Order of Democracy Simón Bolivar (Orden de la Democracia Simón Bolívar); the same day the Caqueta Government gave her the Gold Coreguaje to a Model Citizen (Coreguaje de Oro a una Ciudadana Ejemplar). In May 2016 the Mayor of Segovia, Antioquia, Colombia, acknowledged her in appreciation for supporting the most underprivileged communities.

=== Internationally ===
María Luisa Piraquive with her Platinum Disk.

Maria Luisa received the Frida award in Argentina, given by Vía Nostrim in 2011. In August 2012 in San Juan (Puerto Rico), during the XIII Iberoamerican Summit of Millennium Leaders for an Education with Love and Value, she received a master's degree in educational administration and an honorary doctorate summa cum laude by the Iberoamerican Council in Honor to the Excellence and Education Quality (CIHCE). In August 2013 she received in Mexico, by the YMCA University, a doctorate honoris causa, in recognition of her 40 years teaching with values. A year later the CIHCE and the Puebla Government gave her an honorific doctorate in philosophy of education and a master's degree in educational sciences in recognition of her work for disabled people with the project “Find the Capacity, One Opportunity".

== Honorable titles ==
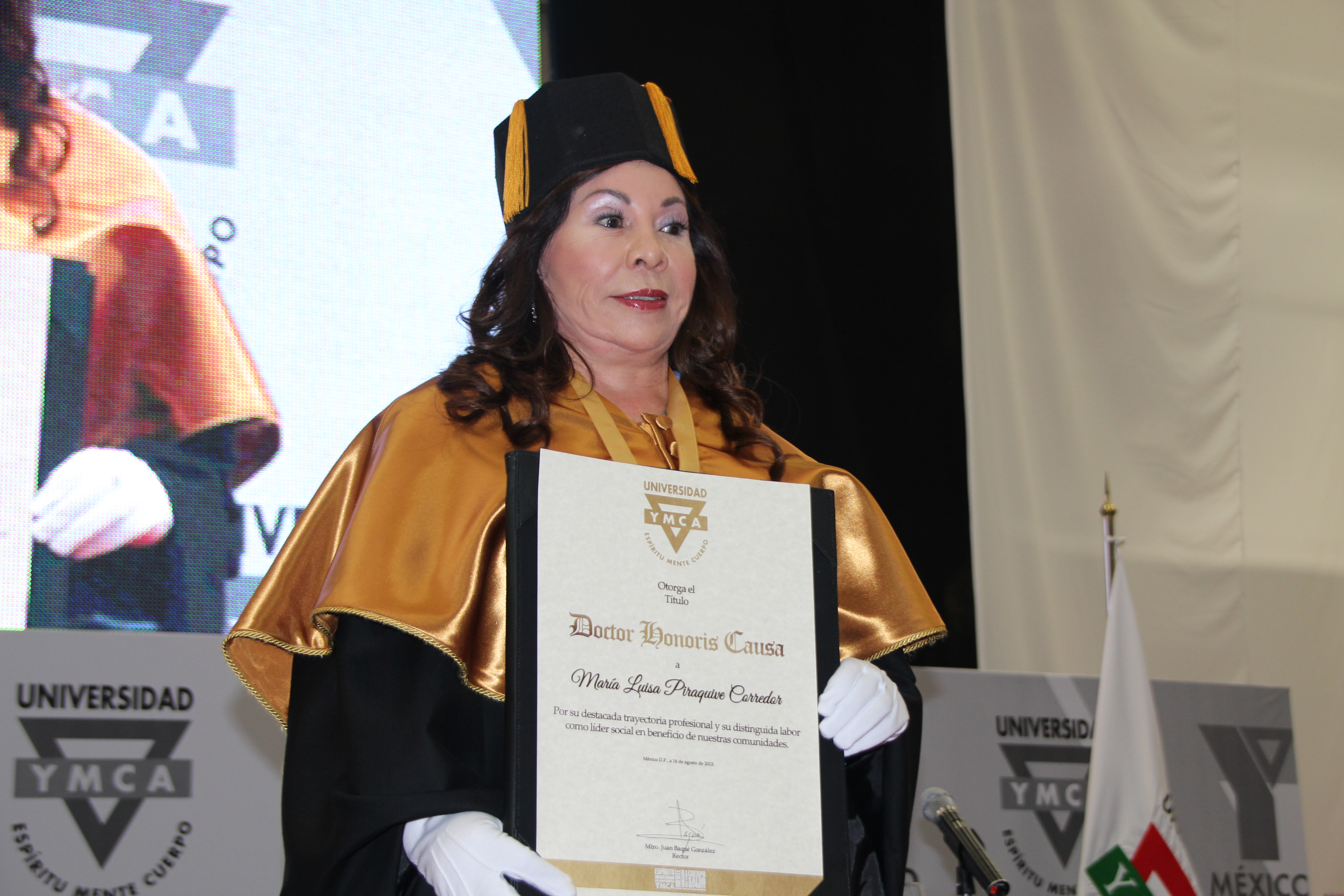
Piraquive with her honoris causa doctorate diploma which she received from the Universidad YMCA of Mexico.

In August 2012, in San Juan, Puerto Rico, during the XXII Ibero-American Summit "Líderes del Milenio Unidos para una Educación con Amor y Valores," ("Leaders of the Millennia United for Education with Love and Moral Values") Maria Luisa received both a master's degree in educational administration and doctor honoris causa summa cum laude awards from the Ibero-American Council in Honor of Quality Education (CIHCE). The CIHCE is a private entity not officially recognized by any international government or body.

In August 2013, she was awarded a doctor honoris causa by the Universidad YMCA of Mexico in recognition of 40 years of teaching with values. In 2014, the Honorable Academia Mundial de la Educación, awarded her the title of Ilustre Académico de Iberoamérica, for her project titled Employment Center for the Social and Productive Inclusion of People with Disabilities. That same year, the aforementioned CIHCE and the State Government of Puebla awarded her an honorary doctorate degree in philosophy of education and a Master of Science in education.

In early 2016, she received the European Campus Stellae Award, for submitting the best research project and was named the Protectress of the First Promotion of master's degrees for this Higher Education Center that year.

List of awards

List of recognitions and merits awarded to Maria Luisa Piraquive
Award	Awarding Body/Entity	Year
Honorary distinction "Order of Merit Cundinamarquesa, Antonio Nariño in the rank of Grand Officer Cross of Gold".	Government Secretary of Cundinamarca, Colombia	2019
2 Acknowledgments for the social contribution to the municipality and construction of the Tierra Negra Educational Institution	Mayor and Council of Chipata, Santander, Colombia	2019
Recognition "Keys of the Municipality"	Mayor of Sachica, Boyaca, Colombia.	2019
Honorary Order of Illustrious Host of the Municipality	Mayor of Duitama, Boyaca, Colombia.	2019
Award as "Illustrious Citizen"	Mayor of de Sachica, Boyaca, Colombia.	2019
Award as "Illustrious Citizen"	Mayor of Candelaria, Valle del Cauca, Colombia.	2019
The "Grand Order of Caucan in the rank of Knight’s Cross"	Departmental Assembly of Cauca, Colombia.	2019
The "Cross of Belalcázar"	Council of Popayán, Cauca Colombia.	2019
Recognition by the health brigades and humanitarian aid carried out by the FIMLM in the municipality of Granada.	Mayor of Granada, Meta, Colombia	2019
Plaque of Honor and Merit	Mayor of Murindó, Antioquia, Colombia.	2018
Recognition for developing invaluable work in favor of the generation of entrepreneurs in the city of Bogota and surrounding municipalities.	Universidad de la Salle, Bogotá, Colombia.	2018
"Order of Citizen Merit"	Governor of Risaralda, Colombia.	2017
International award "Campus Stellae"	Instituto Europeo Campus Stellae, Santiago de Compostela, España.	2016
"Exaltation and Recognition”	Departmental Assembly of Caquetá, Colombia.	2016
"Award Granted"	Mayor of Samaca, Boyaca, Colombia.	2016
‘’Recognition and Gratitude’’	Mayor of Segovia, Antioquia, Colombia.	2016
"Coat of arms of Task Force Zeus"	20 Mobile Brigade of the National Army and the Mayor's Office of Rioblanco, Tolima, Colombia.	2016
Honorary title of "PhD in Philosophy of Education Ph. D"	Ibero-American Council in Honor of Educational Quality, Puebla, Mexico.	2014
Honorary Title of "Illustrious Academic of Iberoamérica"	Honorable World Academy of Education, Puebla, Mexico.	2014
Honorary title "Master in Education Sciences"	Ibero-American Council in Honor of Educational Quality, Puebla, Mexico.	2014
Honorary title of Doctor Honoris Causa	YMCA University, Mexico City, Mexico	2013
"Especial Recognition”	Mayor of Riohacha, Guajira, Colombia.	2013
Honorary title "Master in Educational Administration"	Ibero-American Council in Honor of Educational Quality, San Juan de Puerto Rico, Puerto Rico.	2012
Prize "Alas de Esperanza"	Colombian Air Force, Bogotá, Colombia.	2012
Honorary title of "Doctor Honoris Causa Summa Cum Laude"	Ibero-American Council in Honor of Educational Quality, San Juan de Puerto Rico, Puerto Rico.	2012
"Exaltation and Recognition”	Caqueta Government, Colombia.	2012
"Honor memory by her leadership and founder achievement"	Neiva Council, Huila, Colombia.	2012
Medal "The Gold Coreguaje to a Model Citizen”	Caqueta Government, Colombia.	2012
"Order of Democracy Simón Bolivar and Recognition Award to Finest Personalities”	Republic of Colombia through the Chamber of Representatives.	2012
"Honor roll for environmental care”	Forest Preserve District of Cook County, Chicago, United States of America.	2011
"Frida award /IGF”	The Internet Address Registry for Latin America and the Caribbean. (IARLAC), The International Development Research Centre (IDRC) and Internet Society (ISOC), Buenos Aires, Argentina.	2011
"Honorable mention"	Institución Universitaria Latina (UNILATINA), Bogotá, Colombia.	2011

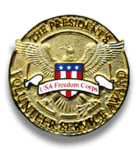
The President's Volunteer Service Award.

== Books and works ==
The first edition of Piraquive's autobiography Vivencias was published in 2001. A second revised edition followed in 2007.

- Piraquive, María Luisa (2008). Experiences (First ed.). Church of God Ministry of Jesus Christ International. ISBN 978-958-442472-3.

Maria Luisa Piraquive compiled Hymns and Choirs. Her first edition was in May 2003, Her second edition was in February 2012 and her third edition was in June 2018.

== See also ==
- Religion in Colombia
- Vivencias (book)
- Church of God Ministry of Jesus Christ International

Preceded by Founder	President of Maria Luisa de Moreno International Foundation; July 20, 2000–present	Succeeded by On charge
Preceded by Luis Eduardo Moreno	Main leader of Church of God Ministry of Jesus Christ International; May 12, 1996–present	Succeeded by On charge
