= Dinero (magazine) =

- Front cover of issue 393 of Dinero featuring, from left to right, Miguel Ángel de La Campa, Serafino Iacono, José Francisco Arata, and Ronald Pantin, executives of Pacific Rubiales Energy.
- Editor-in-Chief: Carlos Enrique Rodríguez Pérez
- Categories: Business magazine
- Frequency: Monthly
- First issue: May 1, 1993
- Final issue: January 10, 2021
- Company: Publicaciones Semana S.A.
- Country: Colombia
- Based in: Bogotá, D.C.
- Language: Spanish
- Website: www.dinero.com.co
- ISSN: 0122-1531

Dinero ("Money" in Spanish) was a Colombian-based monthly business and magazine. Founded in 1993, was Colombia's first and foremost financial and business-news magazine regularly featuring corporate profiles, market trends, economic analyses, interviews and investigative reports.
