= Free University of Colombia =

Private, nonprofit university in Colombia

Coordinates: 4°35′43″N 74°04′32″W

Universidad Libre
- Motto: "Scientia Fons Libertatis"
- Motto in English: Science source of freedom
- Type: Private, Coeducational
- Established: 1890 (as Republican University of Colombia); 1923 (as Universidad Libre)
- President: Jorge Alarcón Niño
- Rector: Fernando Dejanón Rodríguez
- Academic staff: 2,542
- Students: 37,159 (2018)
- Undergraduates: 29,862
- Postgraduates: 7,297
- Location: Bogotá, Cali, Barranquilla, Pereira, Cartagena, Cúcuta, Socorro
- Campus: Urban
- Colors: Red and Black
- Website: www.unilibre.edu.co

Free University of Colombia (Spanish: Universidad Libre), also called Unilibre, is a nonsectarian, coeducational, private and nonprofit university based in Bogotá, Colombia, with six satellite campuses located in Cali, Barranquilla, Pereira, Cartagena, Cúcuta, and Socorro. It is considered one of Colombia's most comprehensive universities, receiving a high quality accreditation from the Ministry of Education for 4 years, and offers sixty-seven degree programs at the undergraduate level and one hundred sixty-three graduate level programs.

Since the original intention of this institution of higher education was to offer the space for unbiased learning during a radical political period in the country, the proper translation would be "Freedom University," given it promotes freedom of speech and political thought.

The university is a member of the Association of Colombian Universities (ASCUN) and the Iberoamerican University Network Universia.

== History ==
The Universidad Libre was established in 1890 as Universidad Republicana (Republican University of Colombia) by the Colegio Académico. In 1910, Universidad Republicana went through terrible economic mishaps. A group of investors determined to save the institution led by Don Eugenio Lopez, proceeded to try to amass the necessary funds to keep the institution alive. On April 13, 1912, Universidad Republicana S.A. was constituted as a society but its commercial name was Universidad libre. In 1913 after many legal battles, Universidad Libre became an independent entity from Universidad Republicana.

Now constituted as a separate entity, Universidad Libre once again faced economic issues with many of the contributors withdrawing their funds. Cesar J. Rodriguez was in charge of the daunting task of yet again raising capital for the institution. Mr. Rodriguez hired the seasoned and charismatic leader Benjamin Herrera as head of the project.

Mr. Herrera was in charge of Universidad Libre until 1921, when he ran an unsuccessful presidential campaign against Pedro Nel Ospina. The defeated Mr. Herrera finally raised the desired amount of capital in 1922 and Julio Cesar Rodriguez announced on March 29, 1922, the beginning of activities.

It was not until February 13, 1923, that Universidad Libre actually started classes, in the first faculty dedicated to Law and Science.

== Alumni ==
Libre's alumni include a vast range of prominent individuals in the history of the country and the region, with the following list representative:

- Alejandro Galvis Galvis (1891-1981), founder the newspaper Vanguardia Liberal and Minister of War.
- Dilian Francisca Toro, physician and politician.
- Domingo Esguerra Plata (1875-1965), lawyer and politician.
- Enrique Olaya Herrera (1880–1937), journalist and President of Colombia.
- German Zea (1905-1989), lawyer, politician and occupied the Ministries of Government, Justice, and Foreign Affairs.
- Gloria Stella Díaz, lawyer and politician.
- Gonzalo Correal Urrego, lawyer and scientist.
- José Fernando Bautista Quintero, lawyer and politician.
- Manuel Enríquez Rosero, lawyer and politician.
- Mauricio Pimiento, lawyer and politician.
- Rodrigo Rivera Salazar, lawyer, diplomat, professor and journalist.
- Ruth Stella Correa Palacio, lawyer and Minister of Justice and Law of Colombia.
