= Alexandra Moreno Piraquive =

Colombian lawyer and politician

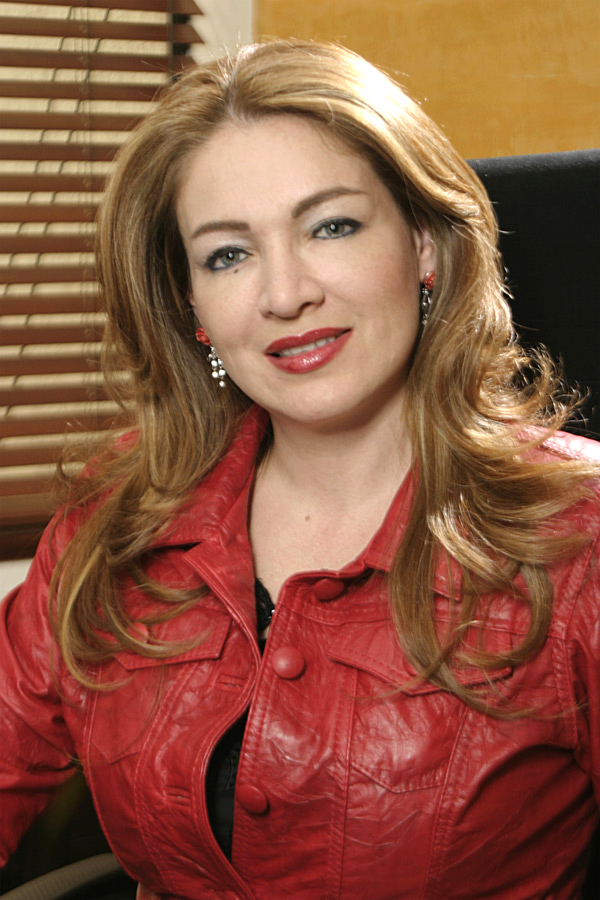

Senator of Colombia
- In office 20 July 2002 – 20 June 2014

Personal details
- Born: 23 August 1969 (age 57) Bogotá, D.C., Colombia
- Party: Independent Movement of Absolute Renovation
- Education: Saint Thomas Aquinas University; Pontifical Xavierian University
- Profession: Lawyer
- Website: redcontraelabusosexual.org/Alexandra-Moreno-Piraquive

Alexandra Moreno Piraquive (born 23 August 1969) is a Colombian lawyer and politician, who served as Senator of Colombia from 2002 to 2014.

Moreno is a co-founder of the Independent Movement of Absolute Renovation (MIRA), a conservative social and political party, of which she has been vice president and president. In 2013, she was ranked as one of the 50 most powerful and influential women of Colombia by Dinero magazine.

== Biography ==
Alexandra was born on 23 August 1969 to Luis Eduardo Moreno and María Luisa Piraquive. She attended Colegio Marillac in Bogotá and went on to attend Saint Thomas Aquinas University where she graduated a lawyer with concentration in Commercial Law. She later attended Universidad Externado de Colombia where she obtained specialization in Territorial Entities Management. She holds a master's degree in economic law from the Pontifical Xavierian University.

== Career ==
In 2000 Moreno and fellow neo-Pentecostal leader, Carlos Alberto Baena López, founded the Independent Movement of Absolute Renovation (MIRA), a conservative social and political party. She became vice president of the party until 2003, when she became president, a post she held until 2008.

In the 2002 parliamentary elections, Moreno led the electoral list of the MIRA party to the Senate of Colombia, obtaining 81,060 votes, or 0.9% of the total votes that granted the party one seat to the Senate, which Moreno as head of the electoral list took becoming Senator of Colombia on 20 July 2002. Moreno was re-elected as Senator in 2006, and 2010.
