= Luis Eduardo Moreno =

Brother Luis Eduardo
- Leader of the Church of God Ministry of Jesus Christ International
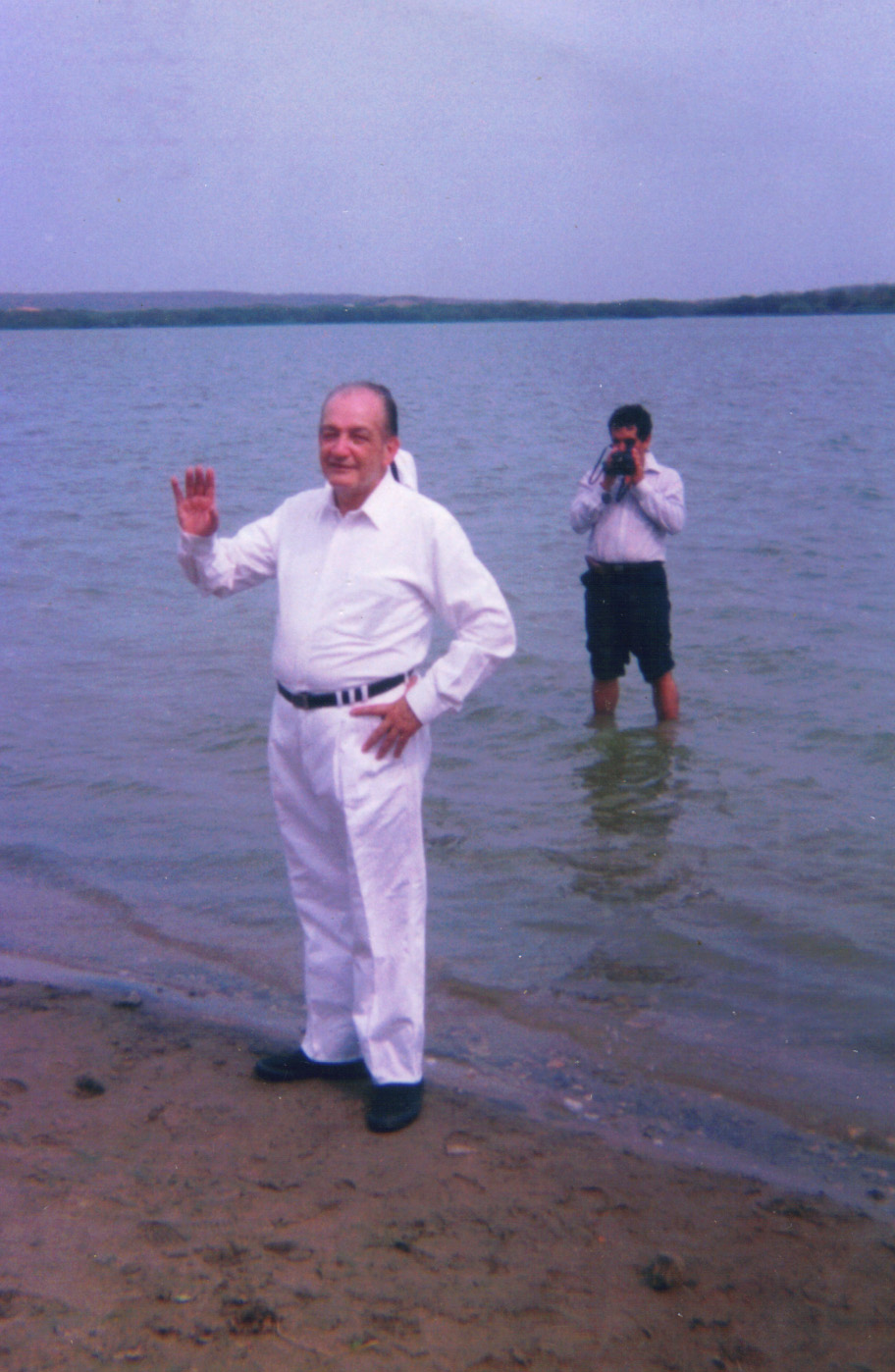
- Luis Eduardo Moreno during a baptism.
- Native name: Luis Eduardo Moreno Moreno
- Church: Church of God Ministry of Jesus Christ International
- Successor: Sister Maria Luisa Piraquive

Personal details
- Born: 28 October 1934 Pereira, Risaralda, Colombia
- Died: 9 May 1996 (aged 61) Bogotá, Colombia
- Parents: María Jesús Moreno and Eduardo Moreno Bedoya
- Spouse: María Luisa Piraquive (1966–1996)
- Children: César Eduardo, Alexandra, Perla, Iván Darío, Carlos Eduardo
- Occupation: Preacher
- Education: Technical-Industrial High-School

Luis Eduardo Moreno Moreno (28 October 1934 – 9 May 1996) was a Colombian preacher, co-founder and 1st Leader of the Church of God Ministry of Jesus Christ International.

Commonly known as Brother Luis, he was the first husband of the Colombian Christian leader Maria Luisa Piraquive and father of senator Alexandra Moreno Piraquive.

== Biography ==
Luis Eduardo Moreno was born on 28 October 1934 in Pereira, capital of the Risaralda Department. Although his family was Catholic, he started to assist to various Pentecostal churches when he became an adult. In these churches he had disagreements with the religious leaders due to the way in which they managed the congregations. In 1965 he met Maria Luisa Piraquive, whom he married a year later. In 1972 he co-founded with his mother, wife and other believers, the Church of God Ministry of Jesus Christ International. Moreno died on 9 May 1996 in Bogota due to a heart attack.
