= Ana Paola Agudelo García =

Colombian economist and politician (born 1983)

Ana Paola Agudelo
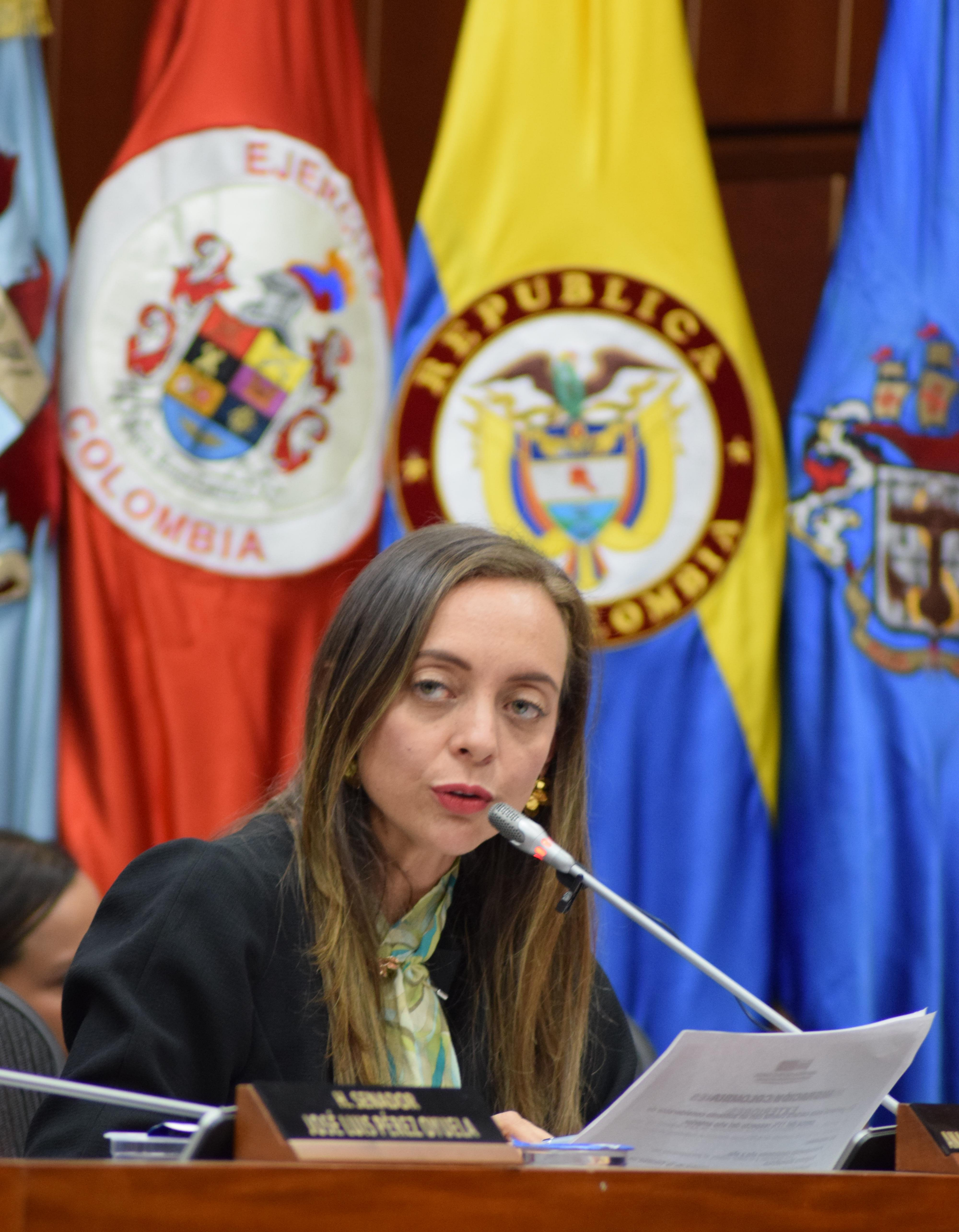
- Agudelo in c. 2019

Vice President of the Senate
- In office 20 July 2025 – 20 July 2026 Serving with Ana María Castañeda
- President: Lidio García
- Preceded by: Jhon Jairo Roldán
- Succeeded by: Manuel Virgüez

Senator of Colombia
- Incumbent
- Assumed office 20 July 2018

Member of the Chamber of Representatives
- In office 20 July 2014 – 20 July 2018
- Constituency: Colombian Expatriates

Personal details
- Born: 8 May 1983 (age 43) Ibagué, Tolima, Colombia
- Citizenship: Colombian; Spanish
- Party: Independent Movement of Absolute Renovation (2010-present)
- Education: University of Tolima
- Occupation: Economist; politician
- Website: anapaolaagudelo.com

Ana Paola Agudelo García (born 5 May 1983) is a Colombian economist and politician member of the MIRA Party. She was elected to the Congress of Colombia as Representative of the Colombian expatriates for the 2014–2018 term with 4663 votes. In 2018 she was elected Senator with over 70,000 votes.

== Political career ==
Ana Paola Agudelo has been a member of the MIRA party during her entire political career. As Representative for the Colombian Expatriates she was member of the Congressional Constitutional Second Commission (also known as the International Affairs Commission) and member of the Legal Commission on Human Rights and Audiences. She was temporarily replaced by Jorge Muñoz by the end of 2015 due to maternity leave. During her campaign to Senate she was the first candidate of the closed list of her party, being the only female candidate holding the first position of a list of candidates among all the political parties running for Senate. As Senator she is a member of the Congressional Constitutional Second Commission.

Much of her work as Congresswoman has been towards improving the quality of life of the Colombian expatriates. Therefore, she has promoted better access conditions to the National Savings Fund for Colombian expatriates and she included a proposition so that the expatriates could obtain the military passbook without being present in Colombia. Moreover, she has worked towards the creation of migration policies and she has pushed for the signing of a repatriation of prisoners treaty with China. In 2015 Ana Paola Agudelo cited the Ministers of Foreign Affairs and of Justice, María Ángela Holguín and Yesid Reyes, respectively, before the Congress to a debate regarding the application of the repatriation treaties. This event was pivotal in the first repatriation of a Colombian prisoner, Harold Carrillo Sánchez, from China, where he was sentenced to life imprisonment.

== Personal life ==
Ana Paola Agudelo was born in Ibagué. She graduated in Foreign Languages and International Business at the University of Tolima in Colombia. She did a Master in Social Economy at the University of Valencia in Spain. In 2016 she obtained a specialization in Public Management and Fiscal Control at Del Rosario University in Colombia. Currently she is doing a PhD in Social Economy and non-profit organizations at University of Valencia.

== Awards ==
She was outstanding graduate in the category of Public Management from University of Tolima. The University of Valencia awarded her an acknowledgment due to her professional commitment. She received the Order of Military Merit Antonio Nariño in the grade Grand Officer from the National Army of Colombia. She received the Simona Duque de Alzate Medal from the National Army of Colombia due to her contributions to the Law 1861 of 2017, which reformed the rules of enlisting and the processing of the military passbook. She is a member of the Special class of professionals of the Colombian Air Force Reserve.
