= Church of God Ministry of Jesus Christ International =

Christian neocharismatic church

- Orientation: charismatic, neo-charismatic – restorationist
- Leader: María Luisa Piraquive
- Region: 60 countries/territories
- Headquarters: Weston, Florida, United States, Madrid, España
- Founder: Luis Eduardo Moreno and María Luisa Piraquive
- Origin: 1972; Bogotá, Colombia
- Congregations: Over 1600
- Aid organization: María Luisa de Moreno International Foundation
- Official website: Official website USA website

The Church of God Ministry of Jesus Christ International (Spanish: Iglesia de Dios Ministerial de Jesucristo Internacional, CGMJCI) is a Christian, neo-charismatic, restorationist church network. It was created in 1972 by the evangelical preacher Luis Eduardo Moreno, his mother María Jesús Moreno, and his wife María Luisa Piraquive. The Church has over 1000 locations in more than fifty countries and territories, and visits 40 other nations worldwide. The main broadcasts of the church on its YouTube channel have more than 250,000,000 views in Spanish and more than 1,500,000 views in English; it is simultaneously interpreted in 12 languages.

The Leader of the Church is Maria Luisa Piraquive, while the current Worldwide Head Pastor is Carlos Alberto Baena.

== History ==
=== Background ===
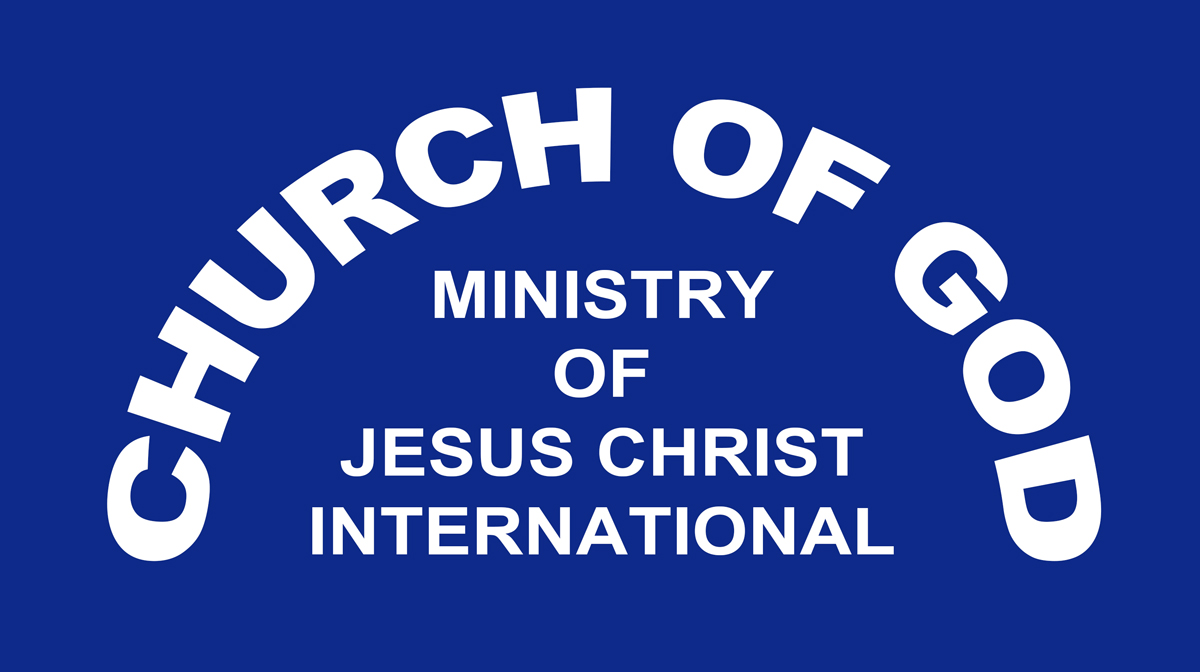
Logo in English

The origins of the Church of God Ministry of Jesus Christ International go back to the wandering of Luis Eduardo Moreno and his mother María Jesús Moreno through various Christian denominations, where he served as preacher. After his marriage in 1966, his wife María Luisa Piraquive joined them.

Luis Eduardo had disagreements with the leaders of the various evangelical denominations in which he worked, due to the fact that he was pressed to give results in terms of growth of the churches at his charge.

=== Beginning ===
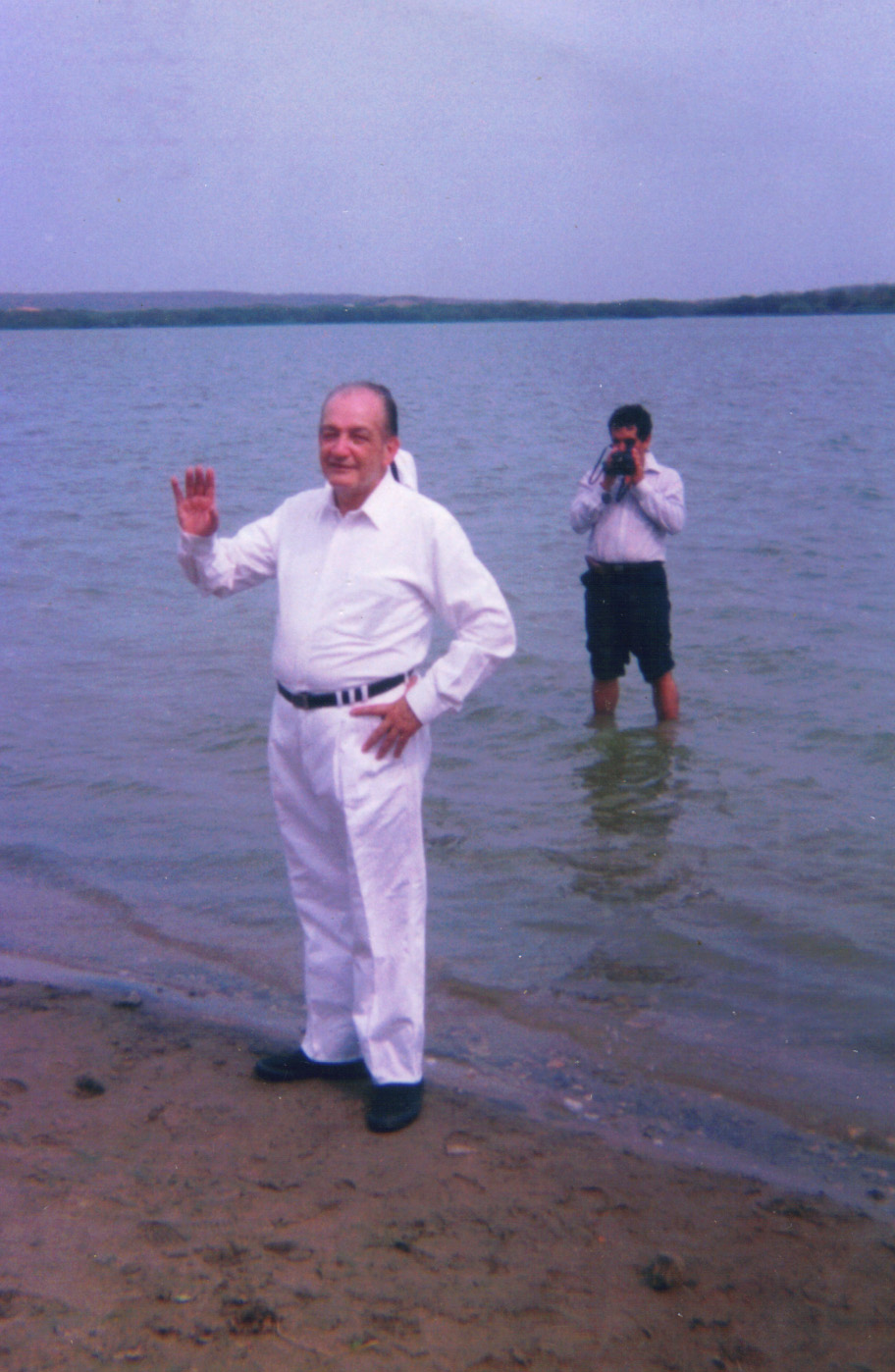
Luis Eduardo Moreno during a baptism

Disappointed by the permanent disagreements with the leaders of the denominations in which they congregated, the Moreno Piraquive family decided not to attend any church anymore and instead, they decided to pray at their house.

In 1972, during the prayers of a small group of four people congregated at the Moreno Piraquive family house, they experienced the first prophecy from God in the Church of God Ministry of Jesus Christ International. In such prophecy, God gave them the instructions about how to direct the church.

As time passed by the church expanded to other departments of Colombia. Currently it has locations in more than 300 Colombian municipalities.

In 1997, the word International was added to the Church's name, and in 2000 the leaders of the church created a political party in Colombia, called MIRA, whose current President is Colombian Senator Manuel Virgüez Piraquive.

Map of countries and territories in which there are churches and congregations

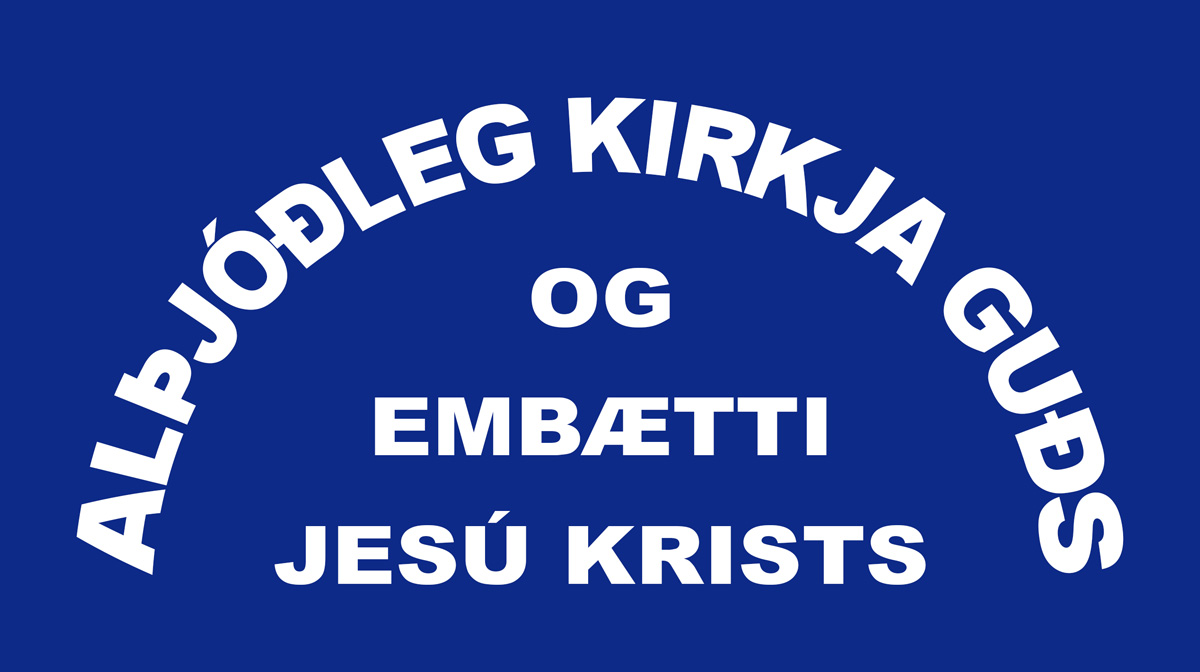
Logo of the Church of God Ministry of Jesus Christ International in Icelandic

== Beliefs ==
The denomination has a charismatic confession of faith.

The Church's most important feature is its reliance on the gift of prophecy, in which a human instrument is used by the Holy Spirit to speak. This practice reminds of the early Christian Church's gift of prophecy, mentioned by Paul in the Epistle to the Corinthians, by John in his Gospel and other New Testament books.

Unlike other Pentecostal denominations, prophecies are seldom general (i. e., given to the public attending the service), but individual, and refer to the past, present and future of the person receiving the message. Its form is of specific promises (of healing, happiness, economic prosperity, spiritual experiencies, marriage, and so on) expected to be fulfilled by God through His power, as well as commandments on the individual's life, as a "guidance for life". Those to whom the promises have been fulfilled often give testimony of them in public in the religious services.

The gift of prophecy is not the only spiritual gift said to appear in the Church. Of a central importance is the gift of tongues, said to be the sign of being baptised by the Holy Spirit, resembling the New Testament's Pentecost. There are also gifts of healing, spiritual visions, dream interpretation, casting away demons and discernment, among others. Believers are encouraged to ask for these gifts in prayer, so that all the congregation may have a personal experience with God. In a typical prayer room there could be one prophesier for each thirty believers.

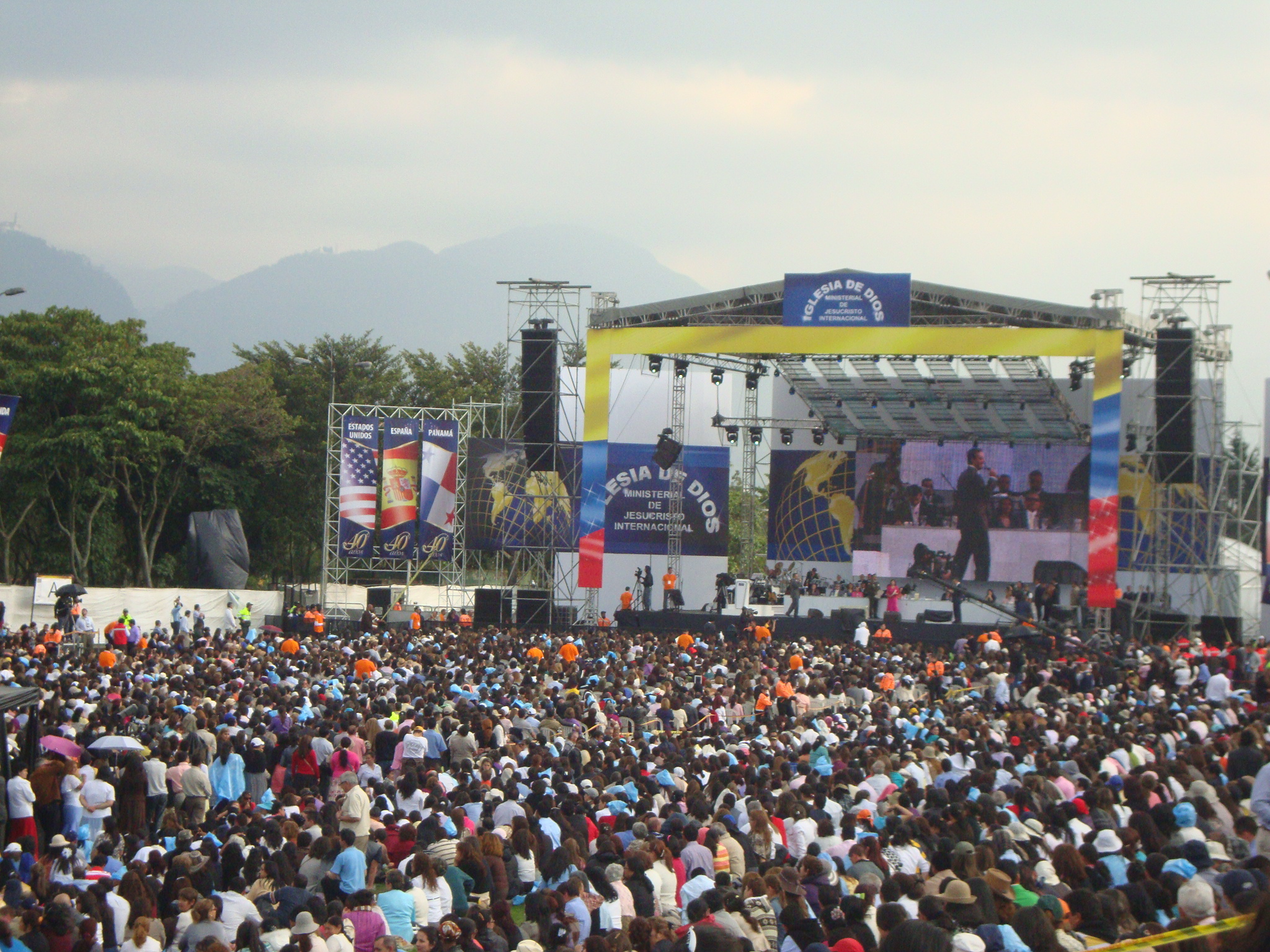
Service in Bogotá, Colombia.

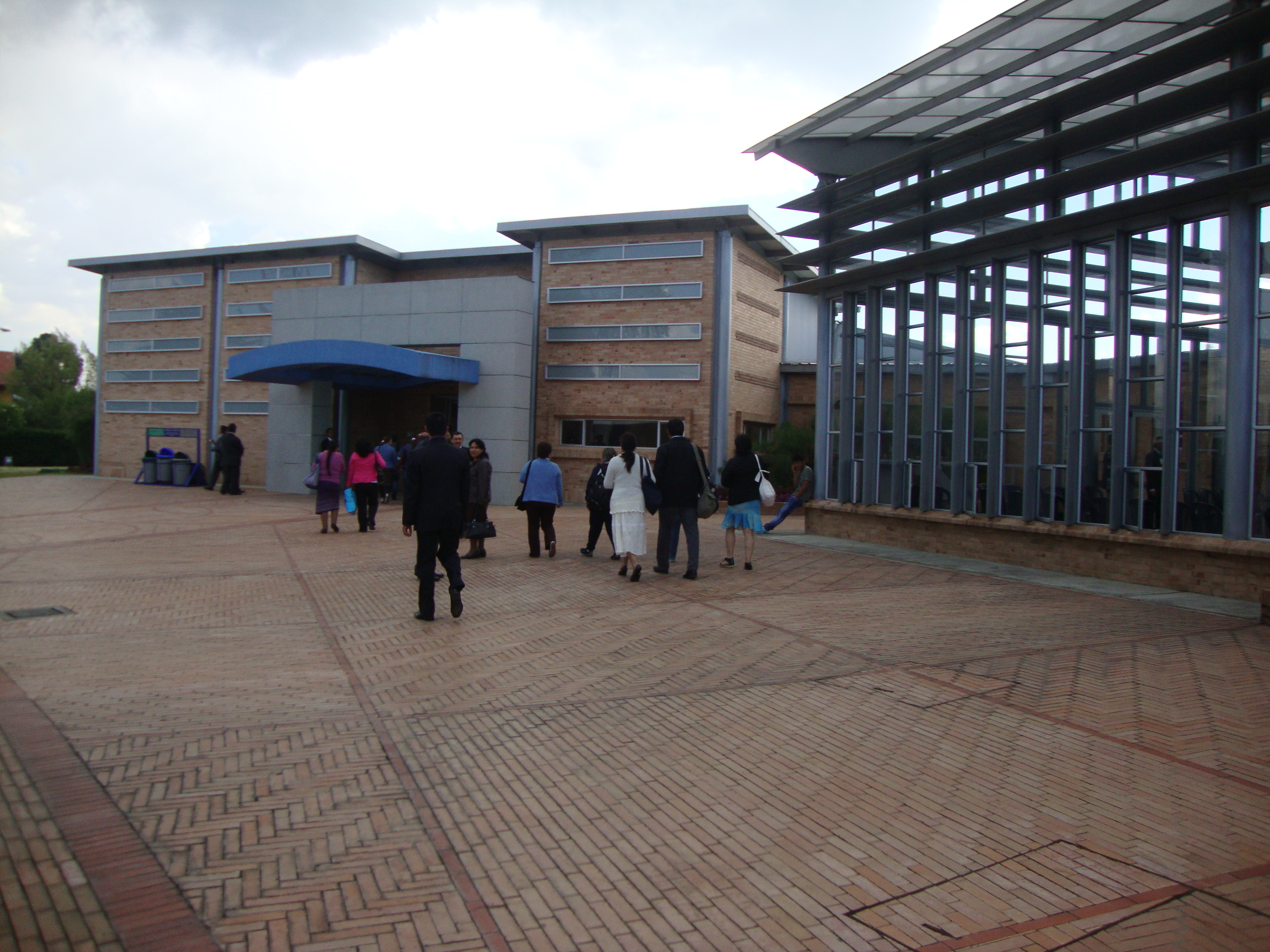
Facade of the Baptistery of Cota in Cundinamarca.

== Maria Luisa de Moreno International Foundation ==
In addition to its religious activities, the church offers social assistance (e.g. via educational programs and health services) in the countries in which it has presence, mainly in Colombia. One of the means through which the church performs this activities is the Maria Luisa de Moreno International Foundation, a philanthropic institution founded in 2000 under the mottos "Help at all levels", "Architects of hearts" and currently "Helping is our work". This NGO is responsible for the distribution of food and the activities related to educational and social services. It also promotes the rights and well-being of mentally and physically disabled people.

The foundation operates in a dozen of countries, especially in Hispanic countries.

== Publications ==
The Zion International magazine is the official magazine of the Church of God Ministry of Jesus Christ International. It covers biblical topics and activities of the church. This magazine is published quarterly, written both in English and Spanish.

== See also ==
- Believers' Church

== Bibliography ==
- Piraquive, María Luisa (2007). Vivencias (Second ed.). Iglesia de Dios Ministerial de Jesucristo Internacional. ISBN 978-958-33-2658-5.
- Piraquive, María Luisa (2008). Experiences (First ed.). Church of God Ministry of Jesus Christ International. ISBN 978-958-442472-3.
