= Bogotá City Council =

City council in Colombia

Coordinates: 4.6247°N 74.0775°W

- Coat of arms

Type
- Type: Unicameral

Leadership
- President: Carlos Fernando Galán Pachon, Bogota For the People
- First deputy-President: Yefer Yesid Vega Bobadilla, Radical Change
- Second deputy-President: Luis Carlos Leal Angarita, Green Alliance

Structure
- Seats
- Political groups: Green Alliance (12) Historic Pact (8); Liberal (7); Democratic Center (5); Radical Change (4); Bogota for the People (3); Conservative (2); Fair and Free Colombia (2); MIRA (1) Social Party of National Unity (1)
- Committees: Development Plan; Budget and Public Treasury; Government; Plenary Session

Elections
- Voting system: Plurality, except for the cases that according to the law require Supermajority. There is no secret ballot system.
- Last election: Bogotá local government elections, 2023
- Next election: Bogotá local government elections, 2027

Website
- concejodebogota.gov.co

The Bogotá City Council is the highest Political and second highest Administrative Authority of Bogotá, Colombia. It is the only city council in the country which has 45 Councillors, since the limit for all other city councils is 21 Councillors. The Bogotá City Council, along with the Principal Mayor, is responsible for the city administration. The Councillors are elected by popular vote for a 4 years term, and can be re-elected.

== Functions ==
The council is responsible for, among other tasks, performing political control of the Capital District's government and studying the Agreement (local regulation) projects. Moreover, the council issues regulations to promote the integral development of the city and its inhabitants.

== Political watchdog ==
There is an initiative called Council How It Goes (Spanish: Concejo Cómo Vamos), which is in charge of doing political watchdog journalism in relation to the activities of the Bogotá City Council. This initiative is sponsored by the Corona multinational (Colombia), the El Tiempo Publishing House (CEET), the Pontifical Xavierian University and the Chamber of Commerce of Bogotá. The Council How it Goes initiative produces reports that are published online, on the El Tiempo newspaper and on the Citytv Bogotá local television channel.
