= Independent Movement of Absolute Renovation =

Political party in Colombia

Independent Movement of Absolute Renovation Movimiento Independiente de Renovación Absoluta
- Abbreviation: MIRA
- Chairman: Manuel Virgüez Piraquive
- Secretary-General: Fabián Puentes Sierra
- Vice chairwoman: Ana Paola Agudelo García
- Founder: Carlos Alberto Baena; Alexandra Moreno Piraquive
- Founded: 2000
- Headquarters: Bogotá, Colombia
- Newspaper: Periódico MIRA
- Youth wing: MIRA Youths
- Ideology: Christian democracy Social conservatism Communitarianism
- Political position: Centre-right
- Religion: Church of God Ministry of Jesus Christ International
- National affiliation: Team for Colombia
- International affiliation: Asociación Miraismo Internacional (MIA)
- Colours: Blue (Pantone 286), White
- Chamber of Representatives: 1 / 188
- Senate: 3 / 108
- Governors: 0 / 32
- Mayors: 0 / 1,103
- Deputies: 8 / 418
- Councillors: 47 / 12,061

Website
- partidomira.com

The Independent Movement of Absolute Renovation (Spanish: Movimiento Independiente de Renovación Absoluta, MIRA) is a political party in Colombia, founded in 2000 by 51,095 Colombians led by lawyer and former senator Carlos Alberto Baena and Alexandra Moreno Piraquive. The party also has functions as a non-profit organization. It has representation in the Chamber of Representatives and in the Senate of the Congress of Colombia, and has also participated in the public corporations of Colombia at a regional level, being stated as the eighth-most influential political force in the country.

The party is commonly known in Colombia as "Movimiento MIRA" or just "MIRA". Members and affiliates are known as "Miraists", and their ideology is called Miraism. On a global level, MIRA has been registered with the World Intellectual Property Organization of the United Nations since September 27, 2011. Miraism has presence in many American countries: Argentina, Bolivia, Colombia, USA, Chile, Costa Rica, Ecuador, Peru, and Venezuela, as well as in some European countries: the Netherlands, Norway, Sweden, Finland, Spain, Switzerland and the United Kingdom. In Asia, it is present in Japan.

At the elections of 2002 the party won as one of the many small parties parliamentary representation. The MIRA Movement took part in the legislative elections of 2006, in which it won 1 out of 165 deputies and 2 out of 100 senators. In 2018, MIRA took part in the legislative elections, in which it won 1 out of 166 deputies and 3 out of 102 senators. The current party Chairman is Manuel Antonio Virgüez.

== History ==
=== Foundation ===
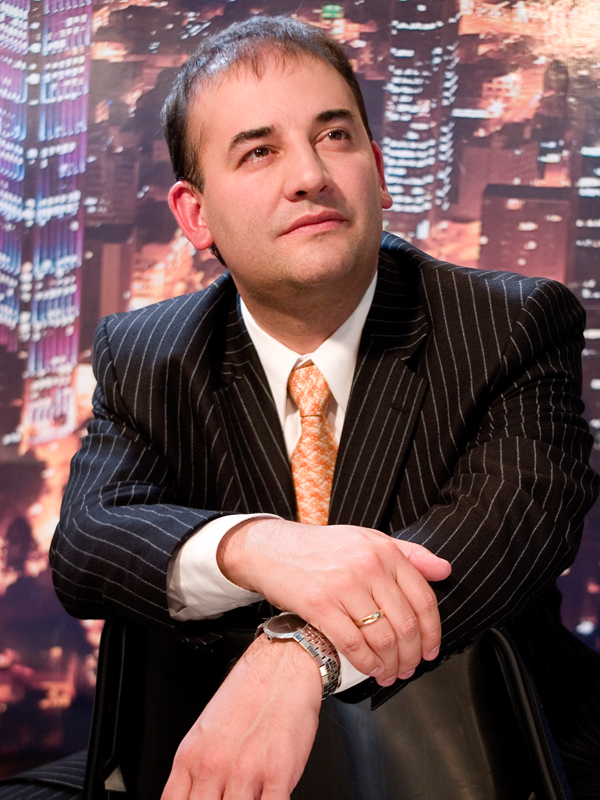
Carlos Alberto Baena, Chairman of the MIRA party

The MIRA party was created in 2000 by Carlos Alberto Baena and Alexandra Moreno Piraquive, being elected as party Chairman and Vice chairwoman, respectively. On 20 June of the same year, they requested legal recognition of the party by the National Electoral Council of Colombia, which they obtained on 26 July under the name "Independent Movement of Absolute Renovation".

=== First elections ===
The first elections in which the MIRA party participated were the regional elections of 28 October 2000. In Bogota D.C., Carlos Alberto Baena was elected councillor thanks to 20,701 votes. In the Quindío department, the economist Bernardo Valencia Cardona was elected deputy. In the Risaralda department, Martha Cecilia Alzate was elected deputy. Besides, the party obtained councillors in several municipalities and seats in several Local Administrative Units. In total, the party obtained 53 curule seats, becoming the 18th political force in the Colombian politic spectrum. Two years later, in the parliamentary elections of 2002, Alexandra Moreno Piraquive gets 81,061 votes, the highest number of votes reached by a woman running for senator in that period, and becomes senator of the Republic of Colombia.

=== Chairmanship of Alexandra Moreno ===
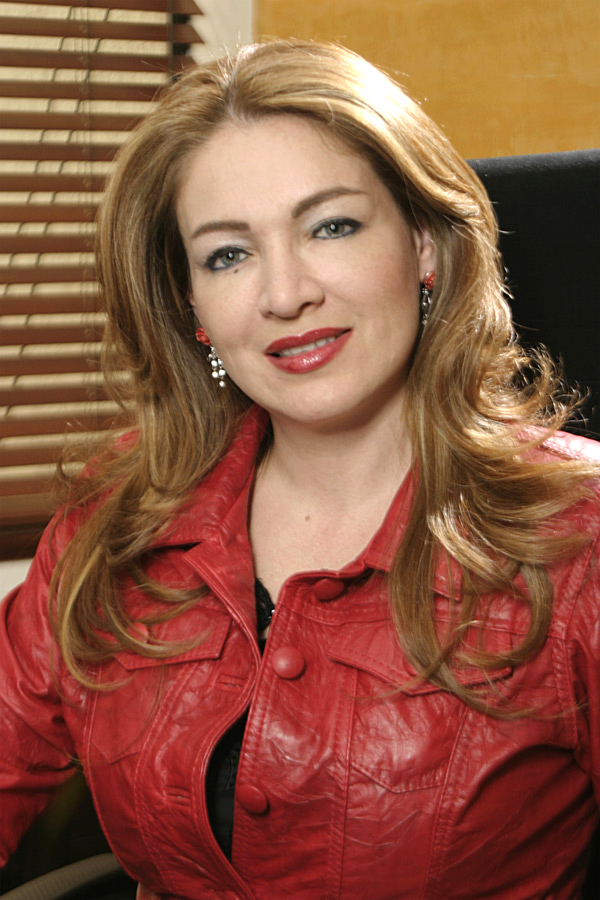
Alexandra Moreno Piraquive, Former Senator of Colombia

On 26 October 2003, the MIRA party participated in the parliamentary elections and kept Baena's position as councillor thanks to 24,277 votes and the position of Bernardo Valencia as deputy of the Assembly of Quindío thanks to 10,743 votes. The party also obtained 84 curule seats, included 10 councillor curule seats. In this period, Alexandra Moreno assumed the chairmanship of the party.

On 12 March 2006, the MIRA party obtained 237,512 votes in the parliamentary elections, which was over the 2% minimum threshold necessary to keep legal recognition in the country. As a result, Alexandra Moreno kept her seat as senator and Manuel Antonio Virgüez obtains a seat as senator. At the same time, Gloria Stella Díaz is elected as representative for Bogota thanks to 52,713 votes. After this results, the MIRA party became the ninth political force in Colombia.

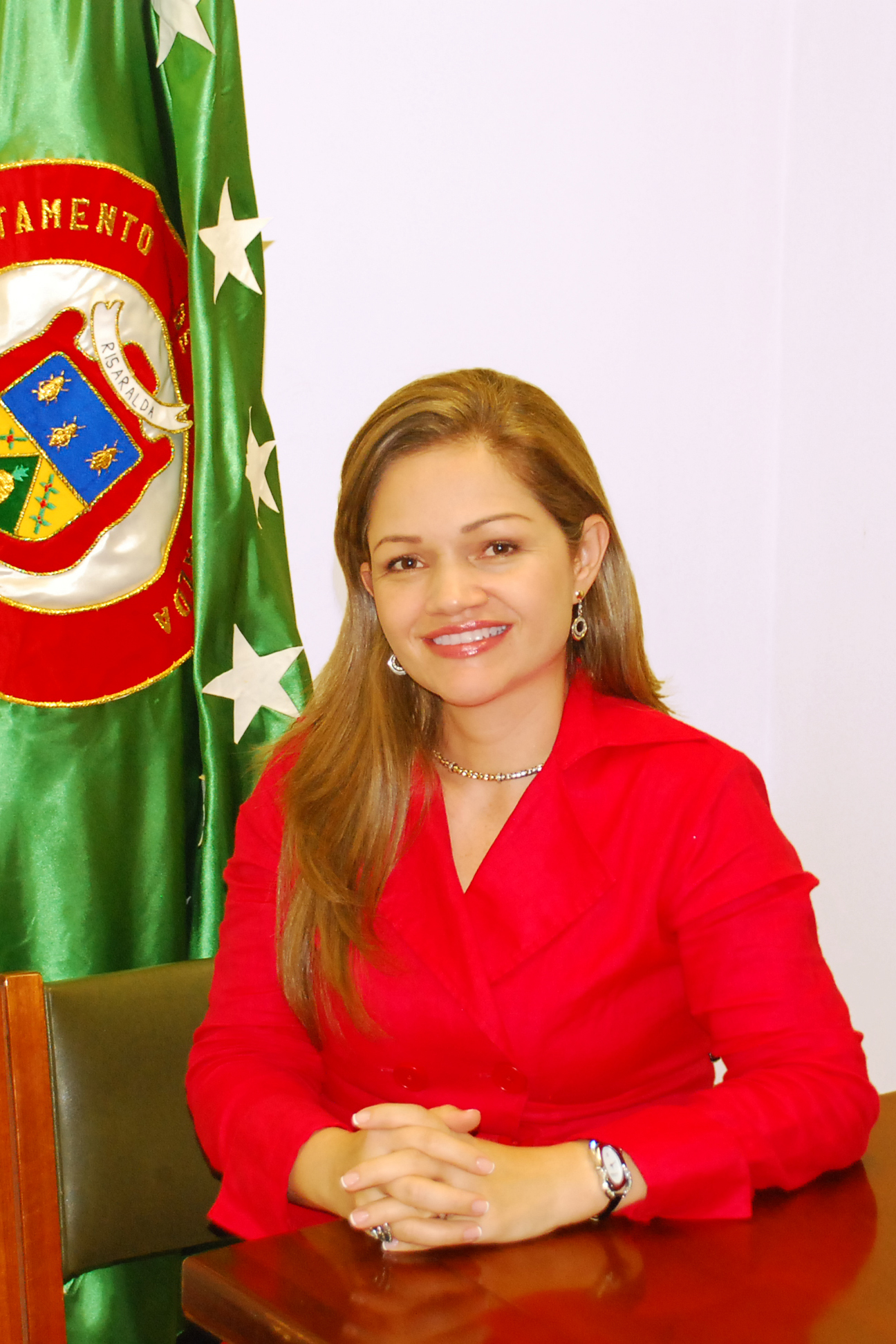
Martha Cecilia Alzate, Former deputy of Risaralda

In the regional elections of 2007, the MIRA party obtained for the first time a mayorship. Carlos Enrique López was elected as mayor of the Calarcá municipality in the Quindío department. Martha Liliana Agudelo, Martha Cecilia Alzate and Guillermina Bravo Montaño were elected as deputies of the Quindío, Risaralda and Valle del Cauca departments, respectively. Besides, the MIRA party obtained 35 councillors and 265 other curule seats.

=== Second Chairmanship of Carlos Alberto Baena ===
Carlos Alberto Baena is re-elected as party Chairman and Manuel Antonio Virgüez is elected as Vice chairman in 2008.

In 2009 the party participated in the popular consultation done on 27 September to select its candidates to the Congress of Colombia. In that opportunity, the party surpassed the expected votation of 80,000 votes and obtained over 205,000, 19,397 of which were given by youngsters between 14 and 18 years old. This popular consultation was the first which allowed the participation of under-age people.

In the 2010 parliamentary elections, the MIRA party obtained 324,109 votes. As a result, the party got four curule seats in the Congress of Colombia and Carlos Alberto Baena was elected to be senator. In the presidential elections of the same year, the MIRA party did not present a candidate to run for the presidency of Colombia nor supported any of the other parties´candidates. In the 2010 parliamentary elections, the MIRA party applied the zip system to their lists of candidates for the first time, which allowed it to have the same percentage of female and male candidates.

In March 2011, Marisol Moreno was elected as Vice chairwoman and Ana Belsú Rodríguez was elected as secretary general.

In the regional elections of October 2011, the MIRA party obtained the governorate of the Caquetá department, the mayorship of the El Paujil municipality, seven deputies, 47 councillors and over 300 other curule seats. Later on, in an atypical election done on 29 January 2012. the party obtained 10 additional curule seats.

In the 2012 popular consultation, the MIRA party obtained the highest votation among the participating political parties and groups thanks to 284,869 votes.

For the 2014 parliamentary elections, the party has defined a closed list of candidates to the Senate and has decided not to run for the Andean Parliament elections neither to participate in the popular consultation. The party also decided not to present a candidate for the 2014 presidential elections nor to support any other presidential candidate.

== Organizational structure ==
The administrative and directive bodies of the MIRA party are:

Body	Functions
National Convention	Defines the directives and ideology of the party
National Direction	Designs the general policies, handles the relations with other institutions and dictates the administrative and financial orientations
Administrative and Financial Direction	Administers the accounting and budget
Ethic Control Council	Examines the behaviour and activities of the party members who are in active public service

The members of the National Direction are:

- The Chairman
- The Vice chairman
- The secretary-general
- The congressmen of the party

== Political positions ==
=== Miraism ===
Since its foundation, the MIRA party has declared that its only political position is the Miraism, which is defined as:

- A change in the attitude of the individual towards looking for the general welfare of people.
- A way of doing politics without using any violent means.
- An ideology that transcends the classical distinction between left-wing and right-wing.

=== Political convictions ===
The MIRA party has been characterized by never having forged political alliances or coalitions with any political party, and by trying to have lists of candidates with the same proportion of female and male candidates. As a result, it was the only political party who presented the same number of female candidates as that of male candidates in the 2010 elections. Moreover, the MIRA party has never been accused of having any relation with the paramilitary groups or the guerrilla movements.

=== Social issues ===
The MIRA party has been opposed to the approval of the euthanasia, abortion and same-sex marriage.

== Characteristics of the party ==
=== Social aid ===
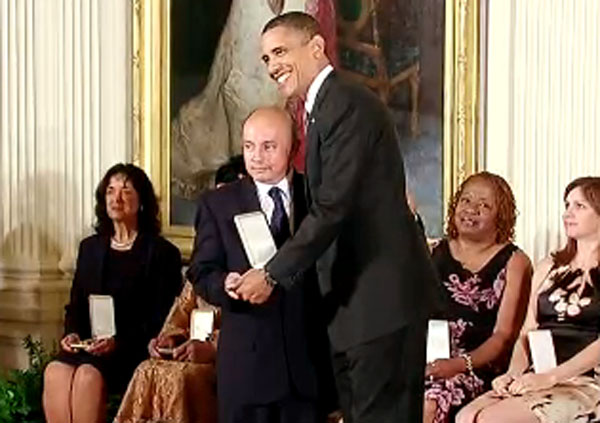
Jorge Muñoz receiving the Presidential Citizens Medal from Barack Obama.

The MIRA party has been known in the United States mainly for offering help to poor people. The party candidate to the Chamber of Representatives for the 2014 parliamentary elections Jorge Muñoz received the Presidential Citizens Medal for his social work in New York City.

=== Legislative activity ===
The MIRA party is known for its assiduous work at the Congress of Colombia. As a result, the party proposes about half of the total number of bills although it has few curule seats.

=== Media ===
The party has a biweekly generalist newspaper called MIRA The Newspaper of the people (Spanish: MIRA El periódico de la gente), and an Internet radio station called "MiraMás Online". The party's website is considered the best among all the political parties´ websites of Colombia, which made it receive the Colombia Online Prize in the category "Best political website" in 2010.

== Members in active public service ==
The MIRA party has the following members holding curule seats in Colombia:

=== Senate ===
- Ana Paola Agudelo García
- Carlos Eduardo Guevara Villabón
- Manuel Virgüez Piraquive

=== Chamber of Representatives ===
- Irma Luz Herrera (Bogotá)

=== Departmental Assemblies ===
Department	Number of deputies
Cauca	1
Caquetá	2
Putumayo	1
Quindío	1
Risaralda	1
Tolima	1
Valle del Cauca	1

=== City Councils ===
47 councillors.

=== Local Administrative Units ===
131 aediles.

== Electoral history ==
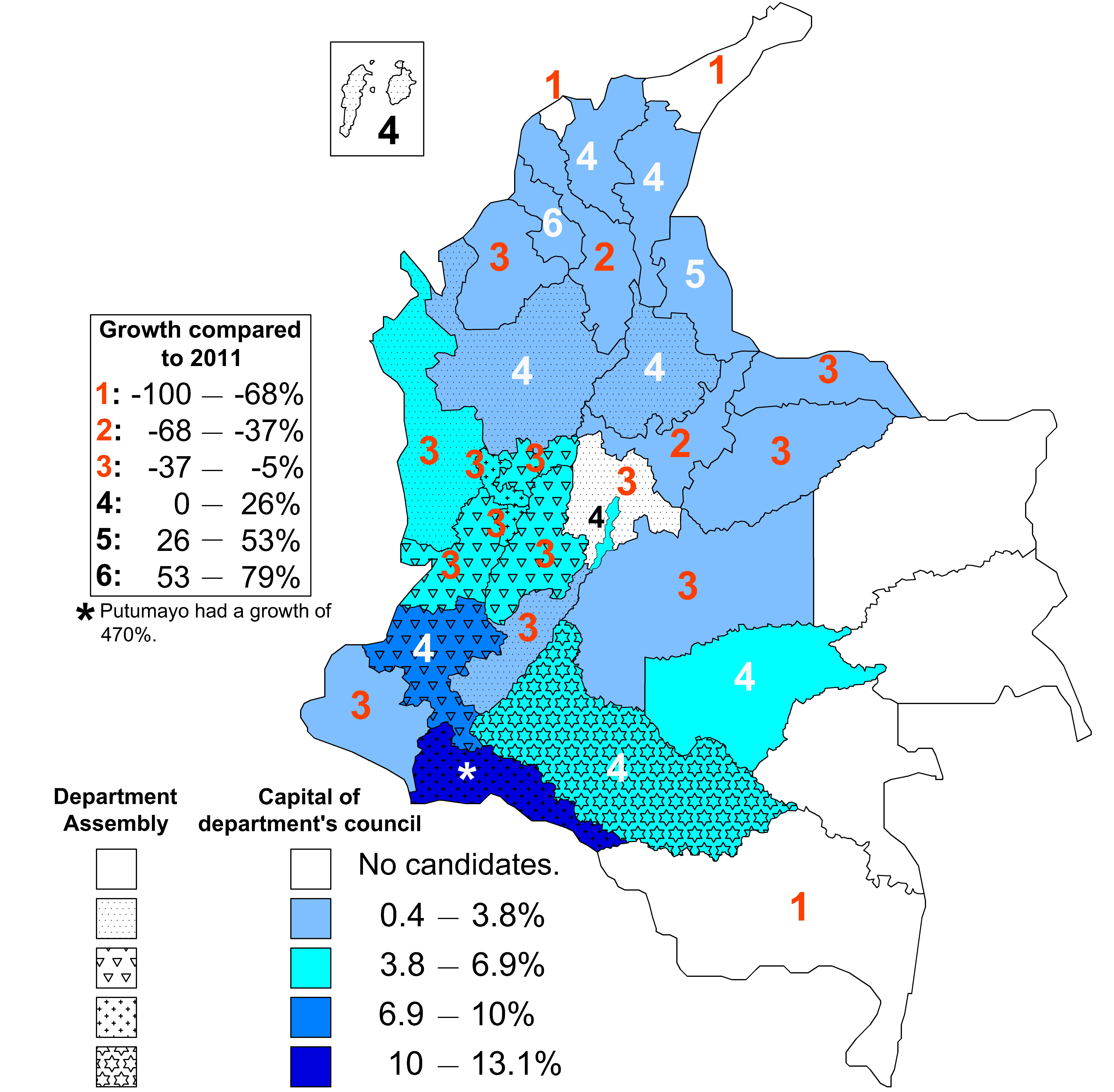
2015 Regional and municipal authorities election results obtained by the MIRA Party

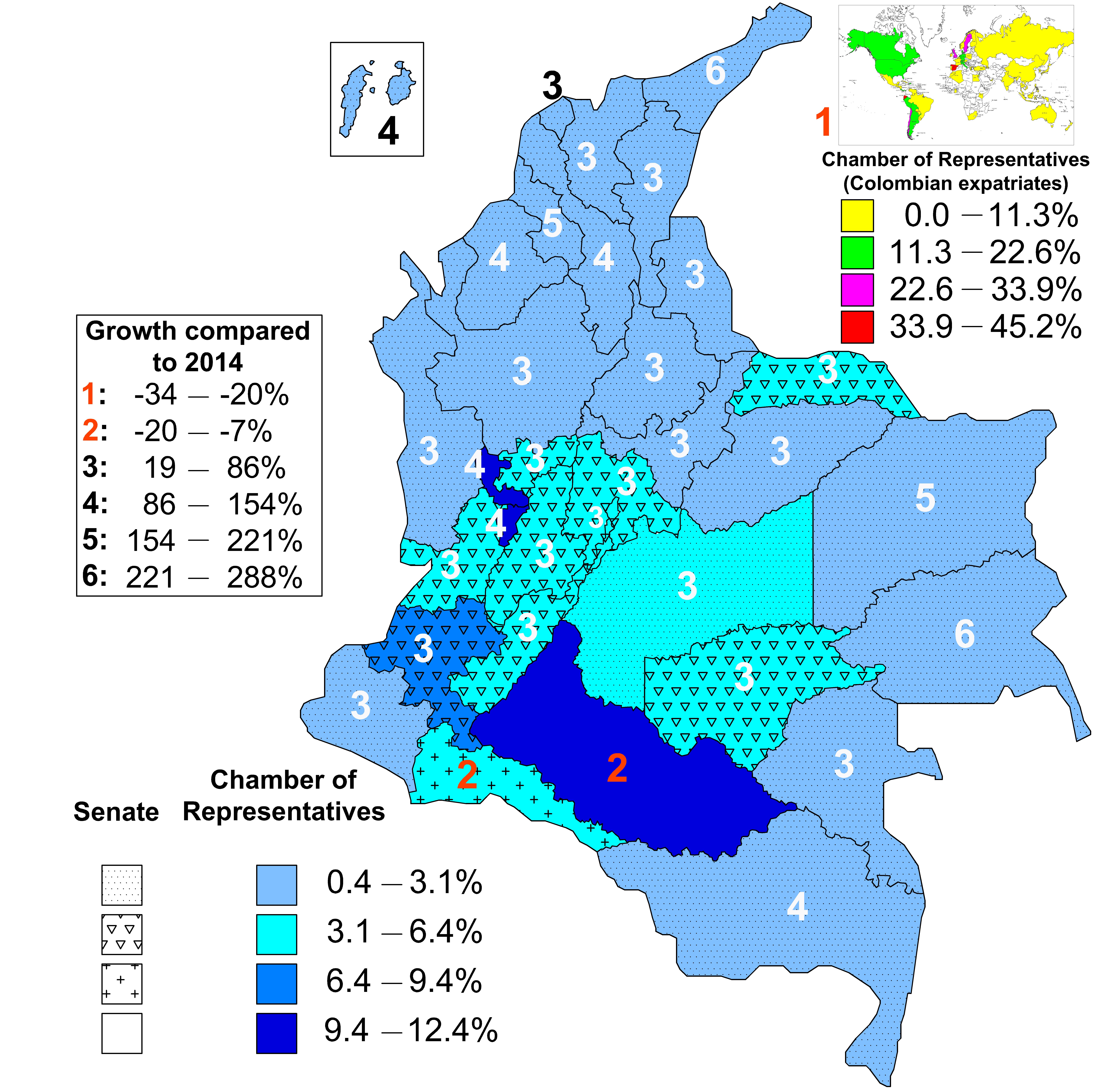
2018 Parliamentary election results obtained by the MIRA Party

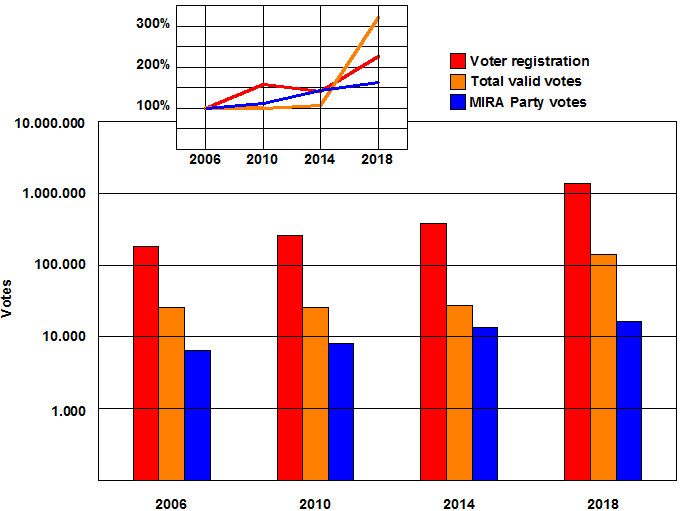
Historic (2006–2018) election results of the MIRA Party in the Colombian expatriates Constituency.

== See also ==
- Evangelical political parties in Latin America
