= Presidency of Álvaro Uribe =

Colombian presidential administration from 2002 to 2010

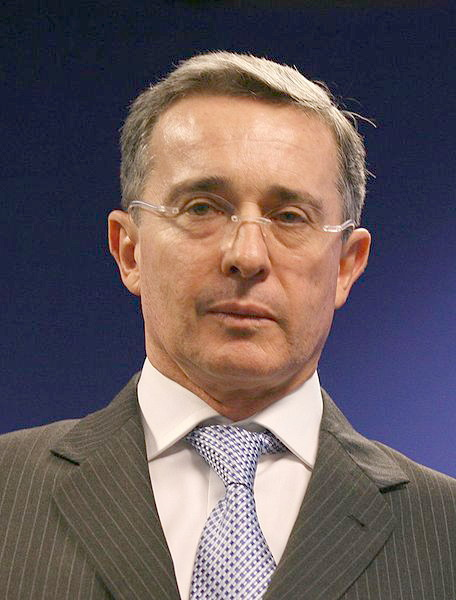
- Official portrait, 2007
- Presidency of Álvaro Uribe; 7 August 2002 – 7 August 2010
- Vice President: Francisco Santos Calderón
- Cabinet: See list
- Party: Colombia First
- Election: 2002; 2006
- Seat: Casa de Nariño

Álvaro Uribe's term as the 31st president of Colombia began with his first inauguration on August 7, 2002 and ended on August 7, 2010. Uribe, candidate of the Colombia First party of Antioquia, took office after a decisive victory about the Liberal candidate Horacio Serpa in the 2002 presidential election. Four years later, in the 2006 presidential election, he defeated the Democratic Pole candidate, Carlos Gaviria, to win re-election. Uribe is the first president not to represent either of the two traditional parties, Liberal and Conservative.

== Election ==
Álvaro Uribe, who had been a member of the Liberal party, ran in the 2002 presidential elections initially as a candidate for his group. However, the candidate alleged a lack of guarantees to compete against former minister and former presidential candidate Horacio Serpa, for which he presented himself as an independent candidate.

His main contenders were Serpa, representing the Liberal Party; former union leader Luis Eduardo Garzón for the Independent Democratic Pole, former minister Noemí Sanín for the Yes, Colombia Movement and senator Íngrid Betancourt for the Green Oxygen Party. Several liberal leaders and the Conservative Party (which in those elections withdrew from the candidacy of former minister Juan Camilo Restrepo) gave their support to Uribe.

The elections were held in the midst of a strong security device in the face of threats from the FARC-EP since they found the population that did not come to vote in said election.

== Inauguration ==
Uribe was elected president of Colombia for the period 2002-2006 with 53% of the total votes (5,862,655 votes), defeating his main contender, Serpa, who obtained 31.8% of the votes (3,514,779 votes).; becoming the first president to win the elections in the first round since the measure was established in the 1991 Constitution. According to the National Registry of Civil Status, participation in the elections was 46,471% (11,249,734 people) of the electoral census .

Later it was learned that Uribe's campaign received 100 million pesos from the Uniapuestas company, in which Enilce López (alias "La Gata") was the majority shareholder. Later, López was captured and charged with various criminal charges. for money laundering and diversion of funds, related to other judicial processes, despite this López has denied knowing about the check for Uribe's campaign. However, Uribe stated that no illegal conduct was incurred since in the 2002 Enilce López's companies were legally constituted.

On August 7, 2002, Uribe's inauguration as president took place in the Palacio de Nariño, the FARC-EP attacked near said building, leaving a balance of 17 people dead and another 20 injured by the explosion of a cylinder-pump; four spell mortars, two of them hit the Presidential Guard battalion, leaving a policeman and a soldier injured, another in the Nariño Palace, and the other in the El Cartucho sector, four blocks from the presidential palace.

The Uribe Cabinet
Office	Name	Term
President	Álvaro Uribe	2002–2010
Vice President	Francisco Santos	2002–2010
Interior	Fernando Londoño	2002–2004
Sabas Pretelt	2003–2006
Carlos Holguín	2006–2008
Fabio Valencia	2008–2010
Foreign Affairs	Carolina Barco	2002–2006
María Consuelo Araújo	2006–2007
Fernando Araújo	2007–2008
Jaime Bermúdez	2008–2010
Finance	Roberto Junguito	2002–2003
Alberto Carrasquilla	2003–2007
Óscar Iván Zuluaga	2007–2010
Defense	Marta Lucía Ramírez	2002–2003
Jorge Alberto Uribe	2003–2005
Camilo Ospina Bernal	2005–2006
Juan Manuel Santos	2006–2009
Agriculture	Carlos Gustavo Cano	2002–2005
Andrés Felipe Arias	2005–2009
Andrés Fernández Acosta	2009–2010
Labour	Juan Luis Londoño	2002–2003
Diego Palacio	2003–2010
Energy	Luis Ernesto Mejía	2002–2006
Hernán Martínez	2006–2010
Commerce	Jorge Humberto Botero	2002–2007
Luis Guillermo Plata	2007–2010
Education	Cecilia María Vélez	2002–2010
Environment	Cecilia Rodríguez	2022–2006
Juan Lozano Ramírez	2006–2009
Telecommunications	Martha Pinto de Hart	2002–2006
María del Rosario Guerra	2006–
Daniel Medina	2010–2010
Transport	Andrés Uriel Gallego	2002–2010
Culture	Paula Moreno	2007–2010

== Domestic policy ==
=== Security ===
As president, Uribe promoted his democratic security policy (PSD) centered on two axes. On the one hand, in recovering control of the territory from the State with the creation of high mountain battalions, of peasant soldier platoons, which they accompanied the National Police in several municipalities, cooperation networks and the offer of rewards to informants. On the other, in attacking the rear guards of the guerrillas.

The PSD included an increase in the budget assigned to national defense; the increase in the force foot, the creation and endowment of new operational units, the purchase of airplanes and helicopters, and the arrival in urban centers with National Police stations; the professionalization and strengthening of the public force, the creation of joint commands, the Headquarters of joint special operations and elite groups of police and army; the increase and strengthening of intelligence, among others. In addition, Uribe consolidated an alliance with the United States so that the Colombian conflict was included in the war against terrorism, led by US President George W. Bush. Likewise, in October 2002, Uribe suggested creating a contingent of Colombian blue helmets to provide security to displaced persons in Colombia and help them return to their original homes.

However, in 2003 the Uribe government was criticized for the frustrated rescue attempt of a group of hostages in the hands of the FARC-EP, who, upon noticing the operation, executed the hostages; the governor of Antioquia, Guillermo Gaviria; former Defense Minister Gilberto Echeverri and eight soldiers. Military operations in urban centers were also criticized, such as Operation Orión in 2002 in Comuna 13 in Medellín, which left several people missing.

Continuing with the PSD, in mid-2003, Uribe moved to the department of Arauca, after serious public order problems arose due to the violence and poverty in the area. The border region with Venezuela was affected by the FARC-EP and the paramilitaries of the United Self-Defense Forces of Colombia (AUC). Uribe governed as president together with his ministers from the city of Arauca. On September 1 of the same year, Uribe also had to travel to the city of Cúcuta for reasons of public order. In addition to the FARC-EP and the AUC, the ELN also had a presence in the border area with Venezuela. In March 2003, a vehicle loaded with explosives had exploded in Cúcuta, leaving 13 dead and more than 60 injured.

A balance on Uribe's first year as president presented by the Colombian Military Forces, the fight against the guerrillas showed positive results with 1,943 deaths and 8,109 detainees, all this in 1,630 combats fought with the army since August 2002. However, various organizations released a book called "The Authoritarian Haunt". The report claimed that Uribe had broken his promises made in the presidential campaign and his policies were violating International Humanitarian Law (IHL). Uribe responded to his detractors by classifying them into three types "... theoretical critics that we respect but do not share his thesis of weakness. Some serious human rights organizations, which we respect and welcome, with which we will maintain a permanent dialogue to improve what needs to be improved... some human rights traffickers who should remove their mask once and for all, appear with their political ideas and stop that cowardice of hiding their political ideas behind human rights. Uribe described the latter as collaborators of the terrorists who used human rights for their purposes.

In this context several attacks against Uribe were presented. The first of these, attributed to the FARC-EP, occurred in February 2003 when a charge of dynamite exploded in Neiva at the time when police officers and the Prosecutor's Office carried out a security operation prior to Uribe's arrival at that city, leaving 18 dead and 45 injured as a result. This did not prevent kidnappings from 2,986 to 800 per year during his first presidency; homicides fell by 40.6 percent and the number of terrorist attacks, 62.5 percent; Assaults on towns went from 32 in 2002 to 5 in 2005.

=== Paramilitarism ===
As part of democratic security, during Uribe's term he sought to negotiate with illegal groups such as the FARC-EP, the ELN and the AUC. The dialogues with the FARC-EP and the ELN did not have major consequences in the political field, but an increase in the desertion of those groups outside the law was seen, partly due to the demobilization policy. Negotiations with the leaders of said organizations were carried out with the AUC, which led to the process of demobilization of paramilitaries in Colombia, which was questioned by several critics who feared that the conditions were not sufficient to prevent a degree of impunity from existing around matters such as crimes against humanity or drug trafficking, as well as reparation for victims.

In June 2005, Clara López, leader of the Polo Democrático Alternativo (PDA) denounced the alleged links of congressmen with the United Self-Defense Forces of Colombia (AUC), after the statement by Salvatore Mancuso in which he stated that 35 percent of the Congress of the Republic of Colombia were friends of his organization. From that moment on, a series of investigations were unleashed in Colombia that compromised various political allies and some officials of the Uribe government with illegal Colombian paramilitary groups in what was called the "Parapolitics". According to the investigations, several political leaders would have benefited from these alliances through intimidation and armed action by paramilitary groups against the civilian population; some would have presumably reached positions in mayors' offices, councils, municipal assemblies and governorships, as well as in the Congress of the Republic and other higher state bodies. At the same time, some of the politicians and officials from their posts would have diverted money for the financing and formation of illegal armed groups and would have leaked information to facilitate and benefit the actions of these groups, which include massacres, selective assassinations, forced displacements and other criminal actions.

At the same time, during Uribe's term there were notable acts of massacres and forced disappearances by paramilitary groups, for which his government was accused several times of having been "soft" with the paramilitaries because this favored the fight against the guerrilla groups. Uribe considered for his part that the demobilization of the AUC led the entire leadership of said organization to jail.

According to researchers from the Javeriana University, analyzing the right to compliance with judicial truth consigned in the Santa Fe de Ralito Agreement, they found that the quality of this factor was low at 44%, medium at 55% and high at 1%. Up to now, it has been an instrument with few guarantees of truth, justice, reparation and non-repetition by the AUC.

=== Economy ===
According to figures consigned in the 2005 balance of the National Development Plan, the Gross Domestic Product (GDP) grew 5.75 percent and the unemployment rate went from 15.7 to 11.8

In August 2002, the Uribe government imposed as a measure to finance the armed conflict in Colombia the wealth tax to "address the necessary expenses to attend to democratic security", determining that the taxpayers of the tax would be all income taxpayers with net worth of more than 169.5 million Colombian pesos at the time. The rate of said tax was 1.2%, being collected only once (in four installments). The collection reached 2.52 trillion pesos, including voluntary contributions, totaling 315,338 people, between companies and individuals.

On the other hand, to promote the tourism industry, the Uribe government organized tourist routes protected by public forces. The initiative was led by the Ministry of Commerce, Industry and Tourism in alliance with the National Army, the National Police and the Ministry of Transportation. These routes were called "Las Caravanas Vive Colombia" as part of the democratic security program proposed by Uribe.

=== Agriculture ===
During Uribe's second term, more than 316,000 peasant producer families were beneficiaries of the Agro Ingreso Seguro (AIS) program. However, in October 2008 a scandal broke out when the magazine Cambio denounced that the AIS had given subsidies to borrowers, among them they Mario Uribe, the president's cousin. Other beneficiaries gave money to uribista initiatives; 45 contributors to the 2002 presidential campaign and 10 to the campaign of the failed referendum for Uribe's third re-election. This led the Colombian government to try to obtain the return of money from AIS in 2009.

As a consequence of the embezzlement, the then Minister of Agriculture Andrés Felipe Arias, Uribe's possible political successor as a candidate for the presidency, was investigated by the attorney general's office, which disqualified him from holding public office for 16 years. He was subsequently arrested and accused of the crimes of embezzlement for appropriation in favor of third parties and entering into contracts without complying with legal requirements. The Superior Court of Bogotá initially ordered his arrest in 2011, however in 2013 he was granted provisional release while he was advancing his trial. He was later sentenced by the Supreme Court of Justice to 17 years in prison and to pay a fine of 30,800 million pesos.70 Initially he fled as a fugitive from justice in the United States where he was arrested by federal authorities in compliance with a red notice from Interpol. Uribe's former minister tried to request political asylum arguing that he was the victim of political persecution and that he could be a victim of torture, but his allegations were rejected by a federal judge and he was later extradited to Colombia. Upon his return to Colombia, his image was publicly hidden and despite being convicted of corruption, he was housed in a private home on a military base, receiving privileged treatment. The Government of Iván Duque in line with Uribe has allowed the former minister to leave his prison and enjoy special privileges while requesting his formal acquittal in court.

=== Judiciary ===
Relations between the executive and judicial branches during the Uribe government, and particularly with the Supreme Court of Justice, were tense, especially in his second term. The two powers have accused each other of conspiracy, especially as a result of the Parapolitics scandal, the Yidispolítica scandal and the non-election of the attorney general by the High Courts from the shortlist sent by the President of the Republic, according to the Political Constitution.

== Foreign affairs ==
In January 2003, Uribe gave statements to Caracol Radio where he asked the United States to make a military deployment in Colombia, "equivalent to the one being prepared in the Persian Gulf," he mentioned in relation to the Iraq War. In March, Uribe decided support as a representative of Colombia the invasion of Iraq.

Regarding the United Nations Organization (UN), in December 2002 Colombia was selected to preside over the Security Council.

Political relations with Venezuela were initially cordial, although they deteriorated at times due to the traditional border conflict in the Gulf of Venezuela. Uribe's support for Bush and policies such as Democratic Security were seen by supporters of Hugo Chávez's government and himself as a threat to the Bolivarian Revolution.

One of the most tense situations arose as a result of the Rodrigo Granda case. But in 2007 relations between the two presidents deteriorated definitively after Uribe authorized Hugo Chávez's mediation in the Humanitarian Agreement and three months later interrupted said mediation. This incident caused a verbal confrontation between the leaders through statements and public statements that ended up undermining relations that had been cordial until now.

In 2008, relations with the President of Ecuador, Rafael Correa, deteriorated due to Operation Fénix, an incursion of the Colombian Military Forces into Ecuadorian territory, in which the FARC-EP commander alias "Raúl" was killed. Reyes" and ties of said organization with members of various international governments were found in the computers of Raúl Reyes.

On other issues, his government has kept out of the position of the United States, among them by maintaining bilateral relations with Cuba and not supporting motions against that nation at the UN.
