= 2006 Colombian presidential election =

- 28 May 2006
- Turnout: 45.05% (▼1.42pp)
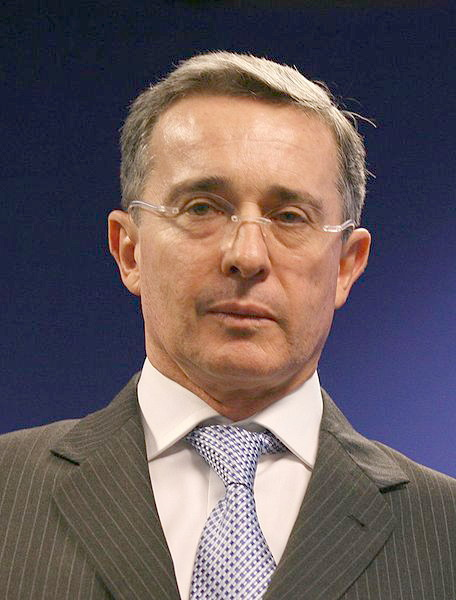

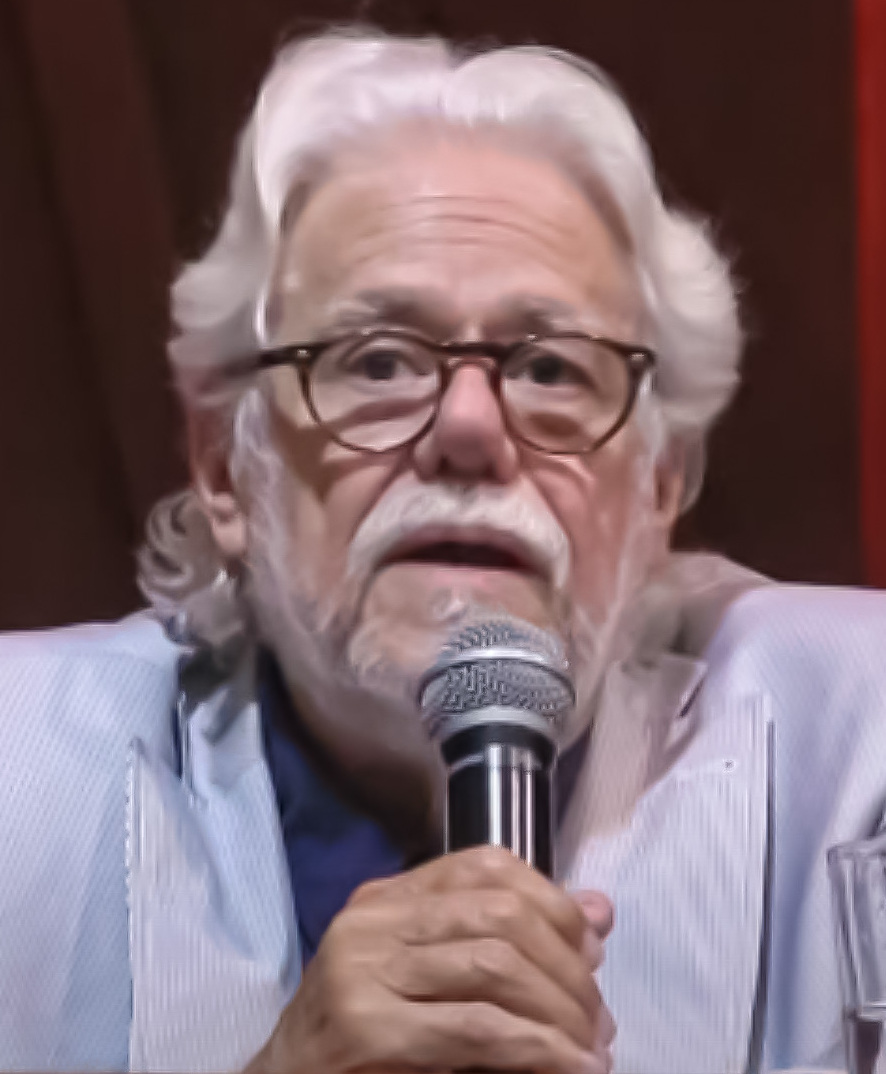

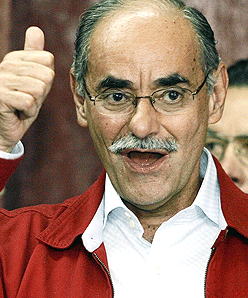
Nominee	Álvaro Uribe	Carlos Gaviria Díaz	Horacio Serpa
Party	Colombia First	PDA	Liberal
Running mate	Francisco Santos Calderón	Patricia Lara Salive	José Gregorio Hernández Galindo
Popular vote	7,397,835	2,613,157	1,404,235
Percentage	62.35%	22.03%	11.84%
- Results by municipality
President before election
Álvaro Uribe
Colombia First
Elected President
Álvaro Uribe
Colombia First

Presidential elections were held in Colombia on 28 May 2006. Álvaro Uribe was re-elected as President for another four-year term, starting on 7 August 2006. Uribe obtained 62.35% of the vote, surpassing the 50% needed to avoid a runoff against the second-placed candidate.

Following a constitutional amendment enacted by the government, this was the first occasion in over 100 years that a Colombian president was eligible for immediate re-election.

== Background ==
=== Presidential Elections ===
Traditionally, Colombian politics have been dominated by two major political parties: the Colombian Conservative Party and the Colombian Liberal Party. However, 2002 presidential candidate Álvaro Uribe broke with precedent by splintering from the Liberal Party and campaigning as an independent under the unrecognized party, Colombia First. Due in part to declining public support for dialogue with FARC following president Andrés Pastrana Arango's failed ceasefire agreement, Uribe gained an edge over his liberal opponent, Horacio Serpa.

Colombia is a presidential republic wherein a president is elected by absolute majority vote in one or two rounds. Although the government of Colombia is separated into legislative, judicial, and executive branches, the President of Colombia serves as both the nation's head of state and head of government (as per the American model). Before 2005 and after a congressional vote in 2015, the president is prohibited from seeking reelection; however, a constitutional reform backed by incumbent president Álvaro Uribe suspended the term limit, allowing him to run for reelection in 2006.

=== Paramilitary Violence and Government Collusion ===
Uribe's 2002 inauguration coincided with a fatal missile attack by FARC on the Casa de Nariño and surrounding Bogotá, leaving 13 dead. The president used the attack as pretext to enact a state of emergency, expanding the power of the military and establishing "special combat zones" around the country. Aside from colluding with right-wing paramilitary groups and receiving military assistance from the United States, Uribe restricted the freedom of the foreign press; in 2004, the Committee to Protect Journalists ranked Colombia as the second most dangerous country for the media in the world (after Algeria).

Starting in 2003, Uribe began extending offers of amnesty to members of the paramilitary coalition UAC in an effort to demobilize the group. His offer of short-term prison sentences for human rights violators earned rebukes from both the Office of the United Nations High Commissioner for Human Rights and Inter-American Commission on Human Rights. This effort for demobilization have been widely considered a failure. Despite the dissolution of the UAC, the emergence of new right wing paramilitary groups, known collectively as The Black Eagles, has resulted in the continuation of atrocities against civilians and human rights workers (including torture, rape, extortion, and murder) in what has been described as a recycling of paramilitarism.

Cooperation between the Government of Colombia, the United States, and anti leftist paramilitaries had been occurring since 1962, primarily to combat FARC and the National Liberation Army (see Plan LAZO, Alianza Americana Anticomunista, Peasant Self-Defenders of Córdoba and Urabá, Los Pepes, and CONVIVIR). In many cases, these connections directly linked government officials to extreme paramilitary violence; in the 1997 Mapiripán Massacre dozens of civilians were mutilated by UAC paramilitaries with the cooperation of the National Army of Colombia through omission (specifically under the orders of U.S. trained Colonel Lino Sánchez). The military was also implicated in participating in and assisting paramilitaries in the 2001 Alto Naya massacre and the 2003 Betoyes Massacre, in the latter instance disguising themselves as members of the UAC.

==== Colombia Parapolitics Scandal ====
On November 9, 2006, the Supreme Court of Justice of Colombia ordered the arrest of three congressmen accused of collaborating with the UAC, with dozens more to follow (including many of Uribe's allies and his cousin Mario Uribe Escobar). To date, 37 lawmakers and 5 governors have been arrested in connection to the Colombian parapolitics scandal (dubbed "parauribismo" by Jorge Enrique Robledo of the Alternative Democratic Pole in reference to the connection between parapolismo and supporters of Uribe).

==== Plan Colombia ====
The original Plan Colombia was proposed by president Andrés Pastrana Arango in 1999 as a "Marshall Plan for Colombia", suggesting increased developmental investment by developed countries to offer peasants an alternative means of income to coca planting. Rather than fumigation or increased military aid, Pastrana proposed the manual eradication of crops as more effective. U.S. president Bill Clinton offered to financially support the plan, the result of which was the plan's total revision by the United States. The final version of the plan was written entirely in English (not to be translated into Spanish until months after it had taken effect).

=== Corruption and Freedom ===
In 2006, Freedom House upgraded Colombia's political rights and civil liberties ratings from 4 to 3, due to improving citizen security, increasing freedom of the press, and declining perceptions of government corruption. Despite this, the rise of press lawsuits as an alternative form of intimidation has been cited as a threat to free journalism in the country.

== Candidates ==
=== Álvaro Uribe Vélez (Incumbent) ===
Álvaro Uribe was notable for his hardline stance against leftist insurgent groups, initially advocating against any concessions and negotiations with groups such as FARC, and for greater military action, and economic and infrastructure development. His actions successfully weakened and fought back the leftist rebel groups, decreasing their territory and scope of control as well as removing their ability to govern great areas of land and even some urban areas. He controversially had negotiated agreements and passed laws granting amnesty to demobilized paramilitary groups, and was referred to by some opponents as "authoritarian." However, his ability to improve the security and economic situation of the country made him overall popular.

==== Political Career and Allegations ====
Having earned a law degree from Universidad de Antioquia and a postgraduate degree in Management and Administration from Harvard university, Uribe became a civil servant by the age of 24. He was appointed Secretary General of the Labor Ministry by 1977–8. Afterwards Uribe lead the Civil Aviation Ministry from 1980 to 1982, and was elected to be the mayor and later a city council member of Medellin from 1982 to 1986. He was elected Senator from 1986 to 1990, under which he won the Star Senator, Senator with the Best Programs and Best Senator awards.

From 1995 to 1997 Uribe was elected governor of Antioquia. During his tenure, he developed a method of civil participation called the Community State. His actions led to around a third of government jobs and official vehicle use to be cut, the funding allocated instead to educating 103,000 new students. Uribe's decisions lead to 939 km of new roads to be paved, as well as existing highways to be repaired. Kidnappings dropped 60% under his tenure. From 1998 to 1999, Uribe was an associate professor at Oxford University. Up until this point, Uribe ran and served as elected officials under the Liberal Party.

The books The Lord of Shadows by Newsweek journalist, Joseph Contreras, and The Horsemen of Cocaine, by Fernando Garavito and Fabio Castillo, accuse Uribe of having granted known drug traffickers licences to fly when working in the Civil Aviation Ministry. The United States State Department in a 1991 report referred to Uribe as "Pablo Escobar's close friend" as well as linked Uribe's father, Alberto Uribe to drug trafficking groups and paramilitaries. Alberto, Álvero's father was a known friend of Pablo Escobar and mafia boss Fabio Ochoa. In 1983, Alberto was assassinated by FARC rebels at his estate, after which Alvaro sold off the property and dedicated himself to politics. However, Mary Beth Long, Deputy Assistant Secretary of Defense for Counternarcotics, in a 2004 opinion letter to the New York Times claimed that allegations of links between Alvaro and the Medellin drug cartel or Pablo Escobar from 1991 were never substantiated.

As governor of Antioquia, Uribe held known contacts with the paramilitary group the United Self-Defense Forces of Colombia (AUC), the goal of which was fighting leftist insurgents. His Community State plan involved arming and involving civilians in efforts against rebel groups, a strategy largely credited with drastically reducing kidnapping rates. At the same time, the national program CONVIVIR, which Uribe supported and enacted in his state, gained controversy for creating anti-insurgency defense forces from known past paramilitaries who had committed atrocities against civilians. Several groups under CONVIVIR would become illegal paramilitary "self-defense" forces.

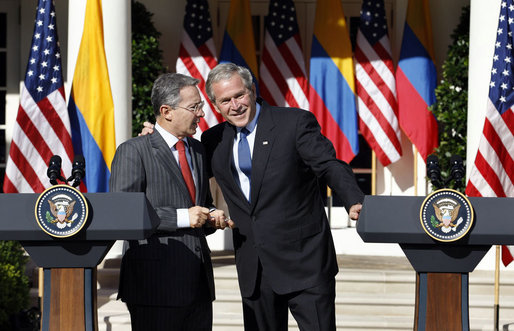
Uribe campaigned in support for a free trade agreement with the United States as well as for working with the United States to defeat insurgents and paramilitary groups and stop the production of cocaine. Opponents criticized too much reliance on the United States. This photo was taken two years after the election.

==== First Term As President ====
Uribe was elected the presidency on the first round in 2002, the first presidential candidate in Colombia's history to do so. Uribe campaigned on a platform of providing no concessions to insurgents and heavier use of military force. He ran as an independent, separating himself from the Liberal Party due to their support for peace negotiations with FARC. This was a turn away from his predecessor's (Andres Pastrana) strategy, which had negotiated a peace deal that had allowed for a demilitarized zone the leftist FARC rebels had used for hiding hostages, drug trafficking and planning military campaigns in the rest of the country.

Immediately upon becoming president Uribe decreed a state of emergency, allowing him to restrict the foreign press and issued special decrees, as well as granting the military license to restrict civilian movement and conduct searches without warrant in 27 districts called "special combat zones." The Constitutional Court would judge these actions to be unconstitutional the next year. Also upon inauguration, Uribe and the AUC (the right wing paramilitary group) declared an indefinite truce conditioned on 10,000 troops being demobilized and 1,500 members weapons being handed over.

In 2003, Uribe granted amnesty to paramilitaries that laid down their weapons, meaning those guilty of atrocities would be allowed lessened jail times or payment of reparations instead of imprisonment, provoking 850 members of a right wing paramilitary group responsible for bloody massacres lay down their arms. A public referendum voted against Uribe's plan to freeze government spending to pay for the anti-guerrilla, anti-corruption, and government efficiency efforts, but the referendum held to allow this votes against his attempts.

In 2004, Uribe announced a $7 billion—dollar initiative called "Phase II" aimed at fighting crime, insurgents and paramilitary groups as well as strengthening institutions, invigorating the economy, and building infrastructure. Retreating from his hardline stance against right-wing paramilitaries by attempting, Uribe attempted to integrate the AUC into the political system, even after revelations of paramilitary infiltration into the government surface. At this point, 3000 paramilitary troops are demobilized, but the United States, opposition leaders, and Human Rights groups, such as Amnesty International, criticize Uribe's bargaining strategy and amnesty. Critics also condemn the growing deficit due to the intensified military actions as well as the power of the paramilitary groups in the country. In December, the House of Representatives passed a constitutional reform allowing for presidents to be reelected.

Running up to the election, due to increased human rights efforts, the military received the highest approval ratings in the country. By this point, the National Liberation Army (ELN), a leftist insurgent group, was almost entirely defeated, the FARC was weakened and limited to smaller territory outside of urban areas. The economy was growing and drug crop cultivation was dropping. However, the Justice and Peace Law, aimed at demobilization and peace, sparked great controversy. Opponents criticized that the law did not require past militants confess and cooperate with authorities, authorities were not given enough time to investigate crimes, and that paramilitary groups would not be fully dismantled. Furthermore, the "Democratic Security" strategy had involved the military engaging in controversial strategies, such as mass-capturing individuals in territories run by militias. Nonetheless, Uribe finished his first term with around 70% approval rating.

==== Positions ====
Uribe supported the Free Trade Agreement (FTA) with the United States, and wanted to create more such agreements with the European Union and Central America as well as attract more direct investment from the rest of the world. He supported further expanding state control to increase national security, trust in the police, and prosecution of crimes. He wished to subsidize and allocate land to those displaced by conflict. Despite not supporting gay marriage, he supported their right to social security benefits and inheritance.

Uribe was a lifelong member of the Liberal Party—even participating in the Liberal Youth and the Liberal militants before his political career began—until 2002 election when he split from the party due to its support of peace talks with the FARC. In this election, Uribe had the support of the Conservative Party (which had supported him and not run its own candidate in 2002 as well). The parties Radical Change, Team Wings Colombia, Citizen Convergence, Democratic Colombia and Colombia Viva also supported Uribe.

=== Carlos Gaviria Díaz ===
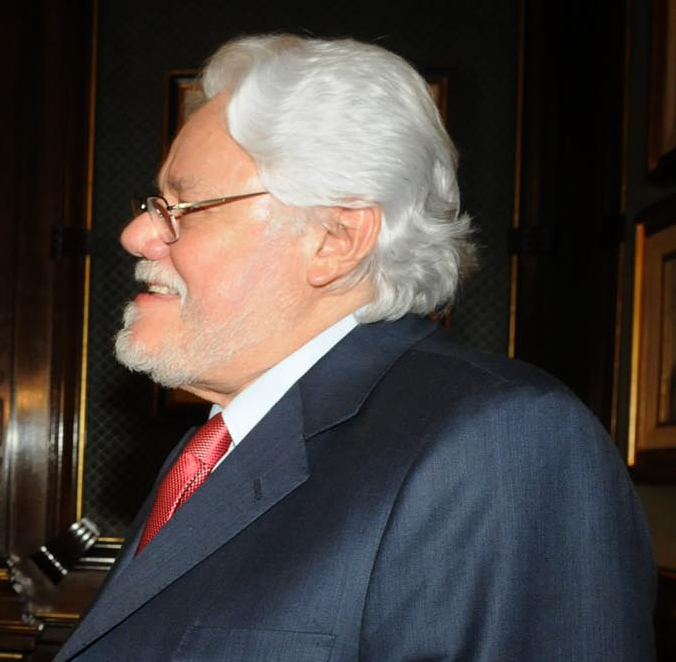
Carlos Gaviria

==== Political Career and Philosophy ====
Carlos Gaviria Díaz was a Harvard educated lawyer and professor of 30 years from University of Antioquia, where he earned his doctorate, a senator from 2002 to 2006 and the first president of the Constitutional Court.

Gaviria started his career in 1961 as a judge and professor, focusing on human rights. In 1980, he was the vice-president of the Regional Committee for the Defense of Human Rights in Antioquia. In 1989, Gaviria returned from a two-year exile in Argentina caused by the assassination of human rights advocates on his committee. He served a magistrate of the Constitutional Court in 1993, becoming president of the court in 1996, where he distinguished himself for his focus on human rights. His judicial decisions helped to decriminalize individuals possessing drugs up to a single dosage. When his term ended in 2001, he joined the Social and Political Front (a group of parties including the Communist Party, Trade Unionists and the Patriotic Union), of which he was elected as the sole senator by proportional representation rules. As a senator he opposed Uribe's attempts to allow for re-election. Eventually he helped create the Alternative Democratic Pole, which successfully joined many of the leftist and liberal parties under one group.

Gaviria's political philosophy centered on the autonomy, dignity, and individual freedoms of citizens, so long as one's choiced did not interfere with others’. A consequence of this philosophy was the belief that poverty and lack of public debate prevented individuals from truly being able to govern their lives and prevented Colombia from being a true democracy.

==== Campaigning and Positions ====
As senator and throughout the campaign, Gaviria promoted redistribution policies that lead to more material equality, and fairer treatment of marginalized groups such as LGBT, indigenous, female, and Afro-Colombians. He advocated for peace initiatives that worked through strengthening employment, cultural development, and education as well as through negotiated peace talks with rebel groups. In congress he fought president Uribe on tax reform, re-election, and policies seen as redistributive to the rich.

Several controversies arose between Gaviria and Uribe during the campaign. First is the release of a report that Gaviria had the largest pension of any government official. Many facts underlying in this claim were proven to be incorrect, mainly that Gaviria did not receive a pension being an acting senator, that the program alleged to give him this pension was also not the pension program he would be under as a former magistrate and that the peso amount his pension would be does not align with the claim from the report. Gaviria and the Alternative Democratic Pole accused Uribe of releasing false and purposefully malicious information to attack him, calling the allegations "actions of a dirty war" by Uribe's campaign. Later, Uribe called Gaviria a "communist in disguise" who will hand Colombia to the FARC, leading Gaviria to denounce these words and strategy of campaigning. Gaviria unapologetically called himself a pure liberal and claimed he will not change his positions of negotiating peace with the FARC as well as decriminalizing abortion, gay marriage, and possession of a personal dose of drugs. Amid these controversies, American academics, journalists and foreign policy experts, including Noam Chomsky signed a letter to president Uribe asking him to denounce the AUC's assassination threats to Gaviria as well as apologize for calling Gaviria a communist in disguise, claiming that the Colombian government was failing to provide necessary guarantees (such as safety) to candidates.

He campaigned on the jointed issues in the slogan "Construyamos democracia, no más desigualdad" ("Let's build democracy, no more inequality") His emphasis on peace meant not only an end to the civil conflicts but further than that the development of an economy, culture, and societal structure that fully allowed for lasting peace and democracy. Not supporting the FTA because he claimed it benefits United States interests over Colombia (for example by allowing US subsidies of agricultural products) and hurt the Colombian education and health sectors of the economy, Gaviria instead focused his economic ideas on developing national industry by supporting Small and Medium Sized Enterprises (SMEs), cooperatives and community groups, and developing the internal market.

=== Horacio Serpa Uribe ===
==== Political career ====
Horacio Serpa Uribe was elected to the House in 1974 as a Liberal, having been in many judicial and local political positions since 1966. As a congressman, he co-founded the Autonomous Liberal Left Front (FILA) and became the top party authority in the Magdalena Medio region. As a representative he served as the president of the Commission of Accusations.

Elected to Senate in 1986 also under the Liberal Party. From 1988 to 1996, he was appointed to positions Procurator and Minister of Government under president Virgilio Barco, co-president of the National Constituent Assembly, peace negotiator in eventually failed talks with the EPL, and co-president of the National Constituent Assembly under president César Gaviria, as well as Minister of Government under president Ernesto Samper. In this last position, he transformed the Ministry of Government into the Ministry of the Interior. He had served on both Barco and Samper's campaigns. Sometimes between these positions he would be elected and serve as senator. In the "Process 8,000" scandal in which it was revealed Samper's allies paid money to the Cali Cartel to support his election, Serpa was one of Samper's staunchest defender, claiming the president had no knowledge of the incidents. He convinced the senate not to indict Samper, and was not indicted for any crimes himself.

In 1998, he ran for president and won the Liberal Party's nomination. Despite a movement of academics and journalists against him, he won the first round, though lost the second to conservative Andres Pastrana, a candidate many in the liberal party supported to distance themselves from the previous scandal. In 2002, he ran for president again and despite leading in the polls, he lost when Uribe won in the first round. Uribe named him ambassador to the OAS, which he served as from 2002 to 2004. In 2005, he became the Vice President of the Socialist International. In 2005, he attempted to unify the Liberal Party against allowing re-election by supporting Cesar Gaviria as director of the party, and he once again was nominated by the party as the Liberal presidential candidate.

==== Positions ====
Serpa did not support the FTA, as well as made clear his support of minority rights. He committed to creating a humanitarian agreement with rebels to reunite families and communities, as well as did not support Uribe's extradition of rebels and paramilitary officers in the middle negotiating with the government. He claimed that the figures stating the number of reintegrated paramilitary officers are exaggerated and promised if the economic conditions continue to improve he would double the minimum wage by the end of his term.

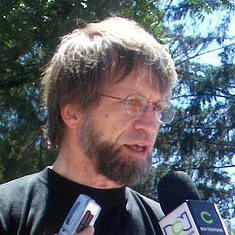
Antanas Mockus Sivickas

=== Antanas Mockus Sivickas ===
Having earned a degree in Mathematics and Philosophy and been Lector of the National University, Antanas Mockus Sivickas became mayor of Bogotá, for two nonconsecutive terms. Mockus is notable for privatizing the Telecommunications Company of Bogotá, prohibiting the use of gunpowder, and repeatedly working to change the culture through symbolic acts. As mayor, he gained much notoriety and publicity for the symbolic acts he took to change society and behavior, such as making a commercial of him taking a shower and turning off the water when using soap during a drought. In two months water usage dropped 14%, and eventually dropped 40%. He created a voluntary tax at a rate 10% higher, which 63 thousand people willingly paid. To peacefully address the unpopularity of the city's chaotic streets, he walked the streets in a costume and a cape as the hero "Supercitizen", handed citizens thumbs-up and thumbs-down cards for them to display in response to the behavior of those around them, and trained originally 20 but eventually 420 mimes to follow and mock pedestrians who did not follow traffic rules.

Mockus emphasizes respect for human rights, development of democracy and most of all the protection and respect for the constitution as what should unite Colombians the most. He argued that taxes could distribute wealth more fairly, that the state should be present in all territories and help ensure compliance and respect for the law as well as be able to function in providing necessary services. He argued income taxes should increase to pay for an increase in funding for education and culture.

=== Other Candidates ===
Enrique Parejo González advocated for reducing corruption, arguing that it was the root of many of Colombia's other issues, as well as poverty. He advocated for peace dialogues as well as tough sentences, and no impunity for those responsible for atrocities.

Álvaro Leyva Durán is a former congressman, senator and Minister of Mines and Energy. He campaigned on ending the war with the FARC through a negotiated peace settlement.

Carlos Arturo Rincón Barreto received the fewest votes, less than one fifth of a percent.

== Issues ==
Major subjects debated during the election included the extradition and demilitarization of private military groups, drugs and crime, corruption, refugees, the economy, and the reelection itself. As the incumbent president, Uribe was a dissident liberal with an independent, anti-guerrilla, anti-crime, pro-U.S. platform that appealed to Conservatives and a significant number of traditionally liberal voters. This split the Liberal party and, according to Freedom House, led to a shift in party politics away from the typical Conservative-Liberal dichotomy as Congress re-aligned respectively as essentially pro- and anti-Uribe forces. Critics of Uribe claimed he neglected social policies. Despite criticism, polls predicted Uribe's reelection.

Former President (and head of the Liberal party) Cesar Gaviria's daughter Liliana Gaviria was murdered on 27 April 2005, leading to an increase of security forces in Bogota and throughout the country. FARC guerrillas did not aim to disrupt the elections and instead called on Colombians to vote against Uribe. All candidates prioritized lowering unemployment rates (around 13% at the time). In his first term, Uribe proposed a free trade agreement with the United States, which other candidates strongly opposed. The Library of Congress credits Uribe's export-oriented growth strategy, efforts to reduce public debt, and strict budgets for economic growth.

Colombia continued to be a dangerous country for journalists, especially those who reported on corruption or drug trafficking. In October, the Inter-American Press Association (IAPA) reported that press-lawsuits were used as a form of intimidation more often in 2005. The prosecutors range from public servants and private parties to government ministers and retired military officers. Press organizations attributed the decline in homicide rates during 2005 to an increase in journalists practicing self-censorship. Colombia has an internally displaced population of 3.6 million (mostly marginalized poor, indigenous and Afro-Colombian), their homes taken over by paramilitary troops. Paramilitary groups, often linked to the police, are also guilty of murdering street children and drug addicts under the guise of "social cleansing." Colombia is similarly dangerous for trade union activists, also the target of labor-repressive practices by paramilitary groups.

=== Re-election Campaign ===
Owing to judicial reform and improvements in citizen security (increasing domestic military presence, declining homicide and kidnapping rates) as well as the economy (declining unemployment, lower public deficit), President Alvaro Uribe Velez retained his popularity before and during the 2006 election. Prior to the election, Uribe campaigned for Colombia's Constitutional Court to overturn the single-term limit and allow him to run for reelection. The campaign for reelection was marked by scandal when in October, 2005 members of the Constitutional Court publicly accused each other of accepting bribes to vote in Uribe's favor. Despite efforts from opposition claiming that eight years in office would allow the president to gain too much power, the Court declared it "as reasonable within the Constitution the legislative act allowing the re-election of the president of the republic." The Court upheld its verdict in November.

Another election law implemented this year established a 2% electoral threshold requirement in legislative elections for a political party (indigenous and Afro-Colombian groups are exempt) to maintain its legal status, as well as only allowing parties to offer only one list of candidates per office.

=== Paramilitary Demobilization ===
A major subject of debated during the election was the issue of paramilitary demobilization. The government had been successfully demilitarizing troops associated with the AUC, and in 2005 adopted a "Justice and Peace Law." Human rights groups pressured the government that year, cautioning that the process of demilitarization would come to an end if promises about extradition and other issues were not upheld. The Justice and Peace Law grants light sentences of eight years to former paramilitary who agree to compensate victims, reveal all past crimes, and aid the government to dismantle paramilitary political and trafficking networks.

Opponents of the Justice and Peace Law maintained that the law encouraged impunity by allowing a maximum sentence of only 8 years. Amnesty International claimed that the process of demilitarization "opens the way for their recycling & as security guards, civilian police and informants." The law only allowed 60 days for the individual to be investigated by Colombia's already overtaxed legal system. Opponents say that they are not required to collaborate with the government or tell the full truth to get the light sentence, proponents countered with the fact that the law does not apply to drug-related offenders.

26,000 paramilitary troops working for the AUC were demobilized under the Uribe administration by 2006. Preliminary peace meetings were successfully negotiated with the ELN, but none with the FARC, who wanted to swap prisoners for hostages, regularly extort payments from businesses, and are involved with drug trafficking. The FARC and the government continued the guerrilla warfare in 2006, the FARC targeting civilians and local-level politicians.

== Results ==
Uribe Favorable results by department

Uribe was elected to his second term of the presidency with 62.35% of the vote, this time backed in addition to the Colombia First party by the new Partido de la U, Partido Conservador, Cambio Radical, Alas Equipo Colombia, Convergencia Ciudadana, Colombia Democrática, and Colombia Viva. He won the majority of the vote in 32 out of 34 departments, including 6 wins with more than 70% of the regional vote (Antioquia, Casanare, Cundinamarca, Huila, Meta, and Risaralda). Carlos Gaviria Díaz came second, with 22.03% of the total vote, and won regionally in 2 out of 34 departments (Nariño and La Guajira). Horacio Serpa came in third place, with 11.84% of the total vote, and no regional wins.

Candidate	Running mate	Party	Votes	%
Álvaro Uribe	Francisco Santos	Colombia First	7,397,835	62.35
Carlos Gaviria Díaz	Patricia Lara Salive	Alternative Democratic Pole	2,613,157	22.03
Horacio Serpa	Iván Marulanda	Colombian Liberal Party	1,404,235	11.84
Antanas Mockus	María Isabel Patiño	Independent Social Alliance Movement	146,583	1.24
Enrique Parejo González	Felipe Cárdenas	National Democratic Reconstruction	42,652	0.36
Álvaro Leyva	Luis Yarzagaray	National Movement for Reconciliation	18,263	0.15
Carlos Arturo Rincón Barreto	Guillermo Cardona	Colombian Community and Communal Political Movement	15,388	0.13
Blank votes			226,297	1.91
Total			11,864,410	100.00
Valid votes			11,864,410	98.53
Invalid votes			177,327	1.47
Total votes			12,041,737	100.00
Registered voters/turnout			26,731,700	45.05
Source: RNEC

=== By department ===
Department	Uribe		Gaviria		Serpa		Mockus		Pajero		Leyva		Rincón		Blank votes	
Department	Votes	%	Votes	%	Votes	%	Votes	%	Votes	%	Votes	%	Votes	%	Votes	%
Amazonas	4,967	41.75%	3,859	32.44%	2,651	22.28%	92	0.77%	110	0.92%	53	0.45%	32	0.27%	133	1.11%
Antioquia	1,108,085	71.10%	279,775	17.95%	109,187	7.01%	12,624	0.81%	4,891	0.31%	2,534	0.16%	1,965	0.13%	39,330	2.52%
Arauca	30,878	66.42%	12,023	25.86%	2,168	4.66%	210	0.45%	173	0.37%	78	0.17%	55	0.12%	907	1.95%
Atlántico	185,786	42.14%	169,034	38.34%	77,056	17.48%	2,691	0.61%	1,465	0.33%	440	0.10%	234	0.05%	4,201	0.95%
Bogotá	1,396,155	64.02%	502,341	23.03%	165,687	7.60%	65,645	3.01%	3,709	0.17%	1,666	0.08%	3,337	0.15%	42,284	1.94%
Bolívar	219,298	59.45%	93,637	25.38%	47,209	12.80%	1,703	0.46%	2,031	0.55%	819	0.22%	445	0.12%	3,763	1.02%
Boyacá	269,265	63.18%	81,458	19.11%	58,811	13.80%	3,874	0.91%	2,148	0.50%	1,114	0.26%	1,630	0.38%	7,859	1.84%
Caldas	249,981	70.40%	60,125	16.93%	29,513	8.31%	4,281	1.21%	1,261	0.36%	545	0.15%	498	0.14%	8,878	2.50%
Caquetá	43,270	62.92%	19,422	28.24%	3,386	4.92%	358	0.52%	269	0.39%	183	0.27%	140	0.20%	1,737	2.53%
Casanare	78,463	81.73%	8,954	9.33%	5,367	5.59%	485	0.51%	553	0.58%	244	0.25%	218	0.23%	1,716	1.79%
Cauca	121,129	40.42%	108,698	36.27%	57,032	19.03%	3,439	1.15%	1,479	0.49%	755	0.25%	420	0.14%	6,756	2.25%
Cesar	184,575	66.84%	41,181	18.53%	27,850	12.53%	518	0.23%	992	0.45%	335	0.15%	198	0.09%	2,633	1.18%
Chocó	35,524	49.79%	9,255	12.97%	23,340	32.71%	183	0.26%	860	1.21%	540	0.76%	160	0.22%	1,491	2.09%
Consulates/Abroad	101,459	84.17%	12,204	10.12%	2,866	2.38%	2,887	2.40%	150	0.12%	51	0.04%	76	0.06%	847	0.70
Córdoba	221,661	58.48%	47,965	12.65%	101,105	26.68%	691	0.18%	3,127	0.83%	1,002	0.26%	561	0.15%	2,913	0.77%
Cundinamarca	517,292	71.01%	131,100	18.00%	55,790	7.66%	6,561	0.90%	2,402	0.33%	1,075	0.15%	872	0.12%	13,353	1.83%
Guainía	2,370	53.89%	1,358	30.88%	493	11.21%	41	0.93%	24	0.55%	12	0.27%	4	0.09%	96	2.18%
Guaviare	8,437	62.77%	2,802	20.85%	1,371	10.20%	97	0.72%	106	0.79%	38	0.28%	37	0.28%	554	4.12%
Huila	197,746	71.07%	52,337	18.81%	19,931	7.16%	1,709	0.60%	954	0.34%	399	0.14%	279	0.10%	4,875	1.75%
La Guajira	42,610	39.89	46,427	43.46%	15,870	14.86%	220	0.21%	478	0.45%	217	0.20%	76	0.07%	927	0.87%
Magdalena	138,537	56.35%	60,815	24.74%	40,739	16.57%	939	0.38%	1,629	0.66%	453	0.18%	231	0.09%	2,633	1.02%
Meta	156,581	71.60%	42,923	19.63%	12,206	5.58%	2,105	0.96%	621	0.28%	293	0.13%	394	0.18%	3,575	1.63%
Nariño	145,643	40.89%	154,413	43.36%	44,285	12.43%	1,828	0.51%	1,504	0.42%	668	0.19%	580	0.16%	7,222	2.03%
Norte de Santander	239,334	67.37%	67,193	18.91%	36,221	10.20%	2,679	0.75%	1,372	0.39%	590	0.17%	440	0.12%	7,417	2.09%
Putumayo	22,883	43.31%	21,099	38.26%	8,309	15.07%	219	0.40%	200	0.36%	129	0.23%	86	0.16%	1,223	2.22%
Quindío	132,896	69.31%	35,128	18.32%	15,802	8.24%	2,237	1.17%	462	0.24%	196	0.10%	177	0.09%	4,853	2.53%
Risaralda	210,738	72.62%	47,663	16.42%	20,418	7.04%	2,998	1.03%	1,134	0.39%	342	0.12%	356	0.12%	6,547	2.26%
San Andrés and Providencia	6,375	54.01%	1,523	12.90%	3,603	30.52%	63	0.53%	47	0.40%	17	0.14%	10	0.08%	166	1.41%
Santander	337,039	50.96%	101,924	15.41%	198,605	30.03%	7,825	1.18%	2,373	0.36%	958	0.14%	520	0.08%	12,097	1.83%
Sucre	114,009	51.73%	44,219	20.07%	55,826	25.79%	632	0.29%	2,018	0.92%	666	0.30%	227	0.10%	1,779	0.81%
Tolima	252,895	65.08%	74,940	19.29%	46,933	12.08%	2,981	0.77%	1,523	0.39%	663	0.17%	358	0.09%	8,280	2.13%
Valle del Cauca	649,995	60.15%	275,247	25.47%	112,106	10.37%	13,668	1.27%	2,505	0.23%	1,141	0.11%	755	0.07%	25,194	2.33%
Vaupés	2,240	58.50%	720	18.80%	720	18.80%	38	0.99%	43	1.12%	24	0.63%	9	0.24%	35	0.91%
Vichada	4,719	65.83%	1,395	19.46%	788	10.99%	42	0.59%	39	0.54%	23	0.32%	8	0.11%	155	2.16%
Source: RNEC

== Aftermath ==
The continuation of Uribe's Democratic Security policy led to further movement against the ELN and the FARC, including new anti-terrorist and anti-drug trafficking laws, increasing the power of the police. In 2008, Uribe was able to negotiate the release of Ingrid Betancourt, a high-profile politician who was held as one of many hostages by the FARC. Strongly backed and supported financially by the US, the policy continued to combat Colombia's leftist Paramilitary groups. The project and its success led to Uribe receiving the US Presidential Medal of Freedom in 2009 for his efforts in this regard.

=== Parapolitical scandal ===
Events shortly after the 2006 elections marked the beginning of a years-long process of addressing apparent paramilitary connections in government. In November 2006, a document was discovered connecting various members of Uribe's coalition ("uribistas") and the paramilitary group AUC, involving negotiations for votes and support. This document, the Ralito Agreement, was signed in a 2001 meeting by representatives of Paramilitary groups, and by 18 current and future politicians, who promised in it to "work toward a new Colombia" and thus secure power for the Paramilitaries. The resulting Colombian Parapolitics Scandal led to the investigation and arrest of many members of congress, including the former senator and cousin to the president (at the time) Mario Uribe. With this, despite demobilizing more than 30,000 paramilitary troops and eliciting a peace agreement with some of Colombia's various paramilitary groups through his first term as president, Uribe came under suspicion because of his cousin's ties to these events. He insisted, however, that he was not tied to these groups.

=== Corruption scandals ===
Following the 2006 election, Congresswoman Yidis Medina revealed that she had taken bribes in exchange for her vote in favor of the 2004 measure to extend term limits. This event prompted the arrest of Medina, as well as the investigation of other lawmakers, such as Sabas Pretelt De La Vega, and Diego Palacio Betancourt. It is commonly referred to as the Yidispolitics scandal.

=== Changes to term limits ===
In 2015, 10 years after the limit on the number of terms served by a president was increased from one to two, congress voted to decrease it back to one. The first vote took place during Uribe's first presidential term (involving the bribing of Congresswoman Yidis Medina), allowing him to be the first of Colombia's presidents in more than 100 years to run for re-election. His successor (and former defense minister), Juan Manuel Santos, was also able to run and be elected for a second term in 2014, However Santos (in his second term at the time) backed the change, to go into effect once he leaves office. Ex-president Uribe, now a Senator with the Democratic Center party, objected to the reinstatement of the limit, but was outvoted.

=== Uribe's career ===
Uribe continued to actively participate in politics on a local level after maxing out his time spent as president. He acted as a mentor of sorts to his successor at the presidency, Juan Manuel Santos. However, this bond was broken upon Santos' assumption of the presidency, and the discovery of various political disagreements. Uribe continued to run for offices such as governorships and mayoral positions, representing various conservative political parties in his endeavors. He was unsuccessful in winning these, however. He eventually began an anti-Santos movement, which he called the Democratic Center Party. Finally, as a representative of the Democratic Center Party, he was able to win a position as a Senator in 2014.
