= Carlos Gaviria Díaz =

Colombian lawyer, professor and politician (1937–2015)

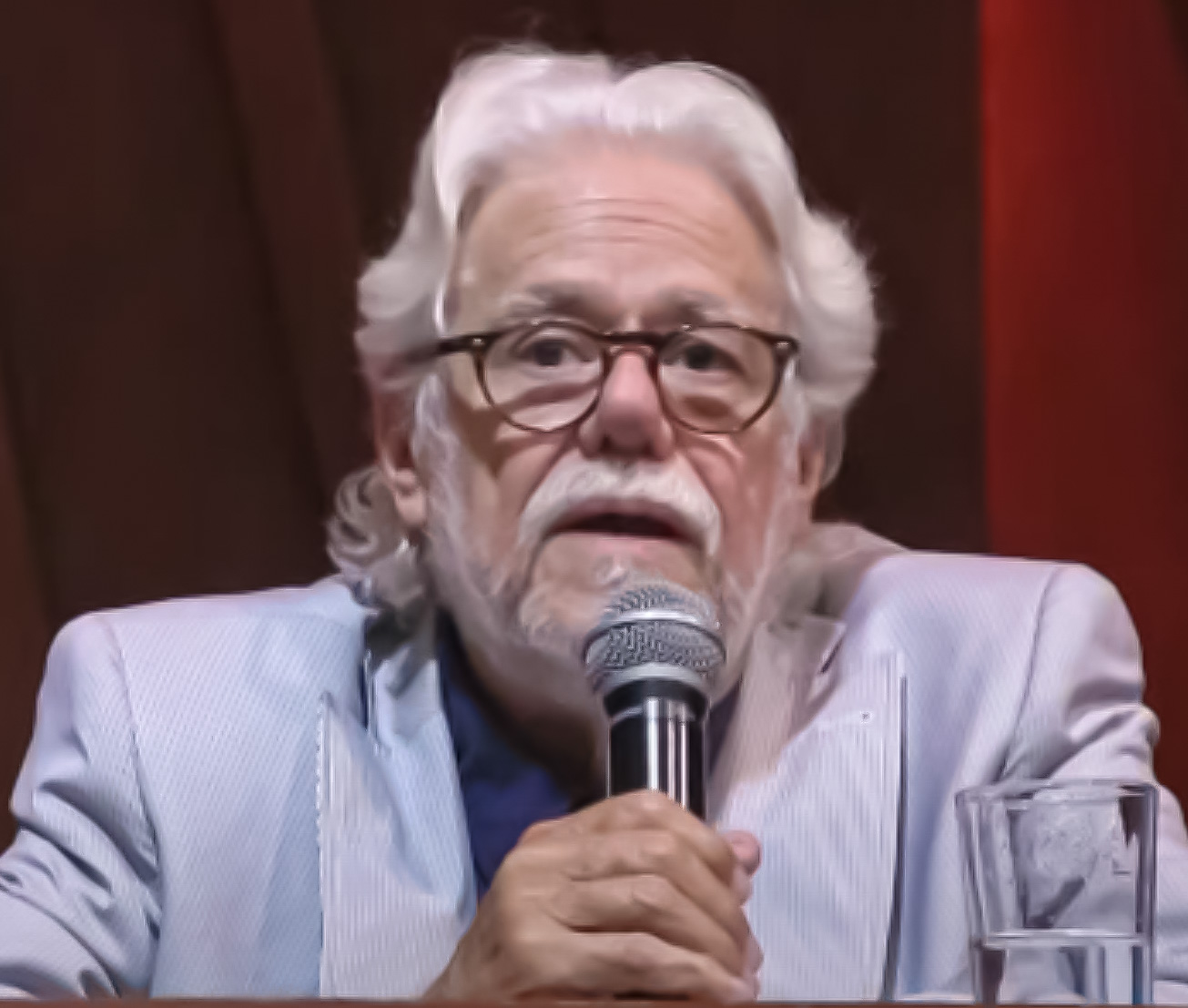
- Gaviria in 2014

Senator of Colombia
- In office 20 July 2002 – 20 July 2006

Magistrate of the Constitutional Court of Colombia
- In office 1 March 1993 – 1 March 2001

Personal details
- Born: Carlos Emilio Gaviria Díaz; 8 May 1937 Sopetrán, Antioquia, Colombia
- Died: 31 March 2015 (aged 77) Bogotá, Colombia
- Party: Alternative Democratic Pole
- Other political affiliations: Social and Political Front
- Spouse: María Cristina Gómez Toro (1966-present)
- Children: Juan Carlos Gaviria Gómez; Ana Cristina Gaviria Gómez; Natalia Gaviria Gómez; Ximena Gaviria Gómez
- Education: University of Antioquia (LLB, LLD); Harvard Law School (MA)
- Profession: Lawyer

Carlos Gaviria Díaz (8 May 1937 – 31 March 2015) was a Colombian lawyer, professor and politician. He served as the 5th Chief Magistrate of the Constitutional Court of Colombia, where he served as a Magistrate from 1993 to 2001. After retiring from the Court he went into politics, becoming a Senator of Colombia in 2002, and running for President as an Alternative Democratic Pole candidate in the 2006 presidential election, ultimately losing to ex-president Álvaro Uribe Vélez, who was seeking his second term in office.

== Academic career ==
Graduated from the University of Antioquia with a Bachelor of Law in 1961, he earned a Ford Fellowship that allowed him to attend Harvard Law School, studying under professors such as Carl J. Friedrich, Paul A. Freund, and Lon L. Fuller, and where he graduated in 1971 with a MA. He returned to Colombia to enrol in the Doctorate Program of the University of Antioquia, where he earned his Doctorate of Law and Political Science in 1965 with his thesis titled Notes on an Introductory Course on the Study of Law, which earned him an Honourable Mention.

He returned to his alma mater, this time as faculty occupying various posts throughout his career in the institution and teaching different courses; along his incursion in the institution, he was Dean of the Faculty of Law from 1967 to 1969, Director of the Department of Public Law from 1974 to 1980. In 1980 he became the Vice President of the Regional Committee for the Protection of Human Rights in Medellín; for his work in this institution and in the University of Antioquia, he became involved in a campaign by paramilitary forces in Colombia to weed out their detractors, among them Gaviria; he received death threats and was forced to go into exile in Argentina. He returned later and resumed his work at the University of Antioquia as Director of the Institute of Political Science in 1988, and Deputy Rector of the University from 1989 to 1992.

Among his pupils was Álvaro Uribe Vélez, whom he met while teaching Philosophy of Law during a time when each other's political philosophies tended to lean more towards the established Liberal Party, but as time passed both moved away from each other in the political spectrum leading up to become the political antagonists they were during the 2000s.

== Judicial career ==
Gaviria began his judicial career the same year he graduated from university in 1961 when he was appointed Municipal Promiscuous Judge of Rionegro, but he returned to Medellín when he was named Professor at the University of Antioquia.

In 1992, Gaviria was nominated as part of the Council of State's ternary list presented to the Senate as part of the election process for new members of the Constitutional Court, a High Court of the Judicial Branch of Colombia recently created by the Colombian Constitution of 1991. Gaviria was successfully confirmed by the Senate, and took office on 1 March 1993 as part of the first permanent Constitutional Court for a constitutional term of 8 years.

On 1 March 1996, Gaviria was elected Chief Magistrate of the Constitutional Court, replacing José Gregorio Hernández Galindo from 1 March 1996 to 1 March 2001, when Gaviria finished his term as Magistrate in the court, and was replaced by Alfredo Beltrán Sierra as Chief Magistrate.

== Political career ==
In 2002, he was elected Senator of Colombia representing the leftist political formation, the Social and Political Front, after achieving the fifth-highest voting result in the elections.

He ran for the presidency of Colombia for the 2006—2010 term, as the candidate of the Alternative Democratic Pole, after winning the bloc nomination over Antonio Navarro.

Polls in late April 2006 placed Gaviria in second place after incumbent President Álvaro Uribe, leaving behind the Liberal Party's Horacio Serpa, who was running for president for the third consecutive time. He lost to President Uribe in the May 2006 election by a margin of 62% to 22%.

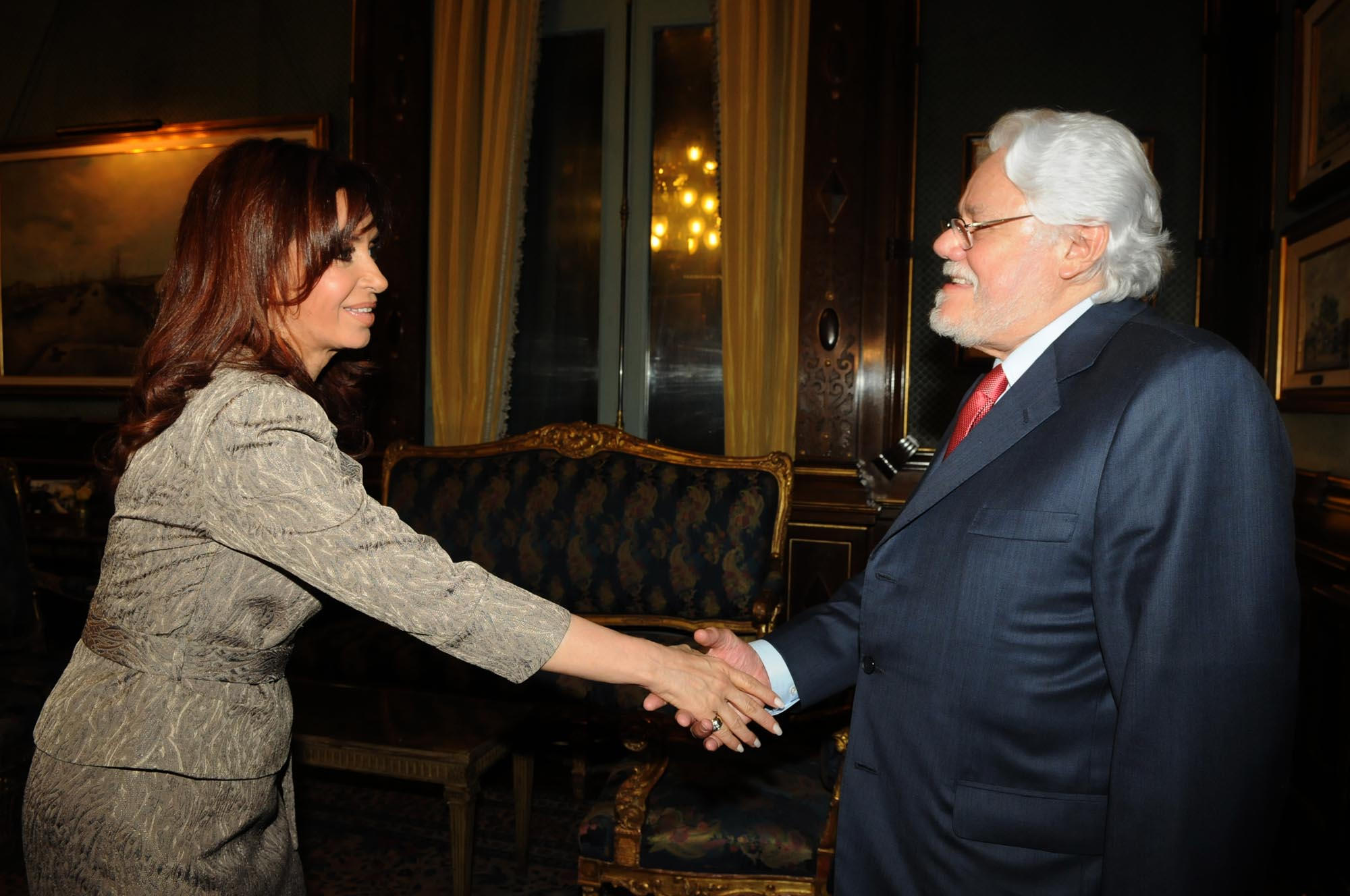
Carlos Gaviria meeting with President of Argentina Cristina Fernández in 2008.

=== Political views ===
One of his main political proposals was to attempt to change Colombia's socio-economic model, which he believed to exemplify some of the worst characteristics of capitalism at a global and local level. By doing this, Gaviria intended to reduce the gap between the rich and poor. Gaviria argued, as do many of his supporters, that this gap has increased over the 2000s and continues to grow, in part due to the economic policies of President Álvaro Uribe's administrations. He disagreed with measures intended to make local and foreign investment more attractive at the cost of reducing benefits for the working class, while simultaneously increasing indirect taxes on the poor and reducing income taxes for the wealthy. Gaviria was also a strong defender of Colombia's 1991 Constitution, in principle, but believed it necessary to fully apply its chapters on human, ethnic and political rights, while at the same time restoring some of the controls that he considered the government and the state should have over the nation's economy and society.

=== Electoral history ===
2002 Colombian legislative election
List	Party	Total votes	Percent of Total	Seats won	Stronghold
517	Social and Political Front	116,067	1.156%	1	Capital District

2006 Colombian presidential election
Candidate	Party	Total votes	Percent of Total
Álvaro Uribe Vélez	Colombia First	7,397,835	62.35%
Carlos Gaviria Díaz	Alternative Democratic Pole	2,613,157	22.02%
Horacio Serpa Uribe	Liberal	1,404,275	11.83%
Antanas Mockus Šivickas	Indigenous Social Alliance	146,583	1.23%
Enrique Parejo González	National Democratic Reconstruction	42,652	0.35%
Álvaro Leyva Duran	National Movement for Reconciliation	18,263	0.15%
Carlos Arturo Rincón Barreto	Communal and Communitarian Movement	15,388	0.12%

== Personal life ==
Carlos Emilio was born on 8 May 1937 in Sopetrán, Antioquia to Carlos Gaviria Arango and Maruja Díaz Holguín, He married María Cristina Gómez Toro, whom he had met in Spain in the summer of 1966, and married later that year on 16 December in a Catholic ceremony in the Church of Our Lady of Perpetual Help in Medellín, albeit him not being a practising Catholic. Together they bore four children, Juan Carlos, Ana Cristina, Natalia, and Ximena. He considered himself an agnostic, but came from a Roman Catholic tradition.

== See also ==
- José Gregorio Hernández Galindo
- Jaime Araújo Rentería
