= John Flannery =

John Flannery may refer to:

- John Flannery (American football) (born 1969), American football player
- John Flannery (baseball) (born 1957), American baseball player
- John Flannery (golfer) (born 1962), American golfer
- John L. Flannery, CEO of General Electric
- John P. Flannery II, American attorney
