= Democratic Colombia Party =

Political party in Colombia

The Democratic Colombia Party (Partido Colombia Demócrata) was a political party in Colombia founded in 2003. After 2006, the small party was decimated by the parapolitics scandal, in which four of its five congressmen were forced to resign and several found guilty.

== History ==
The party originated from the Sector Democrático (Democratic Sector), a faction of the Colombian Liberal Party in Antioquia led by then-senator Álvaro Uribe Velez, his cousin Mario Uribe Escobar and other politicians, created in 1985. The faction formed a legal entity in 1994 to support Álvaro Uribe's candidacy for governor of Antioquia in that year's regional elections.

In 2002, Álvaro Uribe ran for President as the candidate of the Colombia First movement, collecting signatures. Mario Uribe and William Vélez ran for Congress as candidates of the Movimiento de Renovación Acción Laboral. In 2003, Mario Uribe and Vélez, alongside other congressmen, founded the Democratic Colombia Party, of which Mario Uribe was made the president in 2004.

In the 2006 congressional elections, the party won 3 seats in the Senate and 2 in the Chamber of Representatives. The party's three senators were Mario Uribe, Miguel Alfonso de la Espriella and Álvaro Alfonso García while the party's representatives were William Vélez elected for Antioquia and Erik Morris elected for Sucre. During the campaign, the party initially welcomed Eleonora Pineda and Rocío Arias, expelled from other uribista parties for their alleged ties to paramilitary groups; however, Mario Uribe was compelled to expel them due to pressures from the US embassy. The presence of politicians suspected of ties to drug traffickers and paramilitary groups on the party's lists in 2006 led former President and then-Liberal Party leader César Gaviria to comment that the party's list was "full of narcos and paras, it's a mafia list."

== Political positions ==
In the 2006 congressional election, the party declared itself in favour of Álvaro Uribe's reelection and the justice and peace law of 2005; supported the United States–Colombia Free Trade Agreement and said that it supported abortion in the case of rape or artificial insemination without the mother's consent.

== Parapolitics ==
Beginning in 2006, the party faced the parapolitics scandal, in which several of its leaders were linked with paramilitary groups such as the United Self-Defense Forces of Colombia (AUC). As a result, four of the party's five members of Congress elected in 2006 were forced to resign their seats, including Mario Uribe Escobar, whose trial aroused significant controversy because of his close relationship with President Uribe, who was not only his cousin but also his longtime political ally.

The first party members to be detained were senator Álvaro García Romero and representative Erick Morris, currently serving jail sentences for their alleged links to paramilitary groups in the Sucre department; García Romero is also accused of participation in the Macayepo massacre. García Romero was sentenced to 24 years in jail for homicide in February 2010, while Morris was sentenced to 6 years in jail.

Senator Miguel Alfonso de la Espriella was called for questioning before the Supreme Court of Justice of Colombia in 2007 for appearing as one of the signatories of the Pact of Ralito, a secret agreement signed in 2001 between the AUC and some 30 politicians. De la Espriella had been the first to publicly reveal the existence of the pact with Salvatore Mancuso's paramilitary group in 2006. An arrest warrant was issued against him on May 14, 2007 and he resigned his seat in Congress to avoid being tried by the Supreme Court, which meant that his case was transferred to the Attorney General's office. He was sentenced to 3 years and 7 months in jail, after accepting a plea bargain which significantly reduced his sentence.

In May 2007, in his deposition, Salvatore Mancuso, the demobilized leader of the AUC, talked of meetings he had had with senator Mario Uribe Escobar and claimed that Uribe had sought Mancuso's support to win a seat in Congress. He was called for questioning before the Supreme Court in September 2007, but resigned his seat in the Senate to avoid a trial in the Supreme Court. In April 2008, the Attorney General's office issued an arrest warrant against him, leading the ex-senator to seek refuge at the Costa Rican embassy requesting political asylum, which was refused. He was arrested some hours later upon leaving the embassy. Uribe was sentenced to 7 years and 5 months in jail in February 2011.
