= 1958 Colombian presidential election =

- 4 May 1958
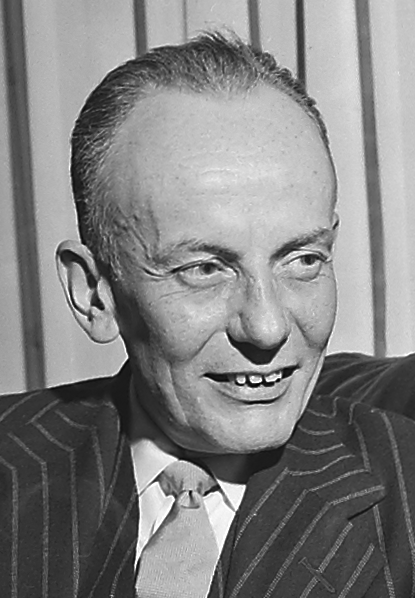

Nominee	Alberto Lleras Camargo	Jorge Leyva Urdaneta
Party	Liberal	Conservative (dissidents)
Alliance	National Front	—
Popular vote	2,482,948	614,861
Percentage	80.14%	19.85%
- Winner by province and municipality
President before election
Gabriel París Gordillo
Military regime
Elected President
Alberto Lleras Camargo
Liberal

Presidential elections were held in Colombia on 4 May 1958. They were the first presidential elections since 1949, following a military coup against President Laureano Gómez in 1953. Following the coup, the two main parties (the Conservative Party and the Liberal Party) came to an agreement on holding office for alternating periods of four years. The agreement, known as the National Front, was approved in a 1957 referendum.

The election resulted in a victory for Alberto Lleras Camargo of the Liberal Party (and also supported by the Colombian Communist Party), who received 80% of the vote. Although the Conservatives had agreed to let the Liberal Party hold power during the 1958–1962 period, dissidents in the Conservative Party put forward Jorge Leyva as a candidate.

== Results ==
Candidate	Party	Votes	%
Alberto Lleras Camargo	Colombian Liberal Party	2,482,948	80.14
Jorge Leyva Urdaneta	Colombian Conservative Party dissidents	614,861	19.85
Others		290	0.01
Total		3,098,099	100.00
Valid votes		3,098,099	99.66
Invalid/blank votes		10,468	0.34
Total votes		3,108,567	100.00
Registered voters/turnout		5,386,981	57.71
Source: Nohlen
