= Mario Uribe Escobar =

Colombian politician and lawyer

Senator of Colombia
- In office July 20, 1994 – 9 December 2008

President of the Senate of Colombia
- In office 20 July 2000 – 20 July 2001
- Preceded by: Miguel Pinedo Vidal
- Succeeded by: Carlos Armando García Orjuela

Member of the Chamber of Representatives of Colombia
- In office 20 July 1986 – 20 July 1994
- Constituency: Antioquia Department

Personal details
- Born: August 12, 1949 (age 77) Andes, Antioquia, Colombia
- Party: Democratic Colombia
- Other political affiliations: Liberal
- Relations: Álvaro Uribe Vélez (cousin)
- Education: University of Antioquia
- Profession: Lawyer

Mario de Jesús Uribe Escobar (born 1949) is a Colombian politician and lawyer. Uribe-Escobar graduated in Law from the Autonomous University of Medellín and the University of Antioquia.

== Political career ==
He began his political career as councilman of his hometown; the municipality of Andes, Department of Antioquia. Between 1982 and 1986 served as deputy of the Department Assembly of Antioquia and then to the Chamber of Representatives of Colombia in representation of Antioquia, serving from 1986 to 1994, in which he was Vice President of the Chamber between 1990 and 1991 and worked as member and president of the Investigations and Accusations Commission. In 1994 Uribe-Escobar was elected to the Senate of Colombia and served until October 2007. Uribe-Escobar quit the Senate after receiving a notification from the Attorney General of Colombia calling him to testify on regards to the Parapolitics scandal. He was President of the Senate of Colombia from July 20, 2000 to July 20, 2001.

In 2003 Uribe-Escobar participated in the foundation of the Democratic Colombia Party which was the base of the former Sector Democrático movement. Uribe-Escobar was considered one of the most important allies of President of Colombia and cousin; Álvaro Uribe.

== Parapolitics scandal ==
=== Alleged meeting with paramilitaries ===
In relation to the Colombian parapolitics scandal, Uribe-Escobar was first mentioned by Jairo Castillo Peralta aka "Pitirri" who was a former member of the paramilitary group United Self-Defense Forces of Colombia (AUC) and was a personal bodyguard of former politician Álvaro García Romero also implicated in the scandal for mingling with paramilitaries. From his exile in Canada, Castillo-Peralta said that Uribe-Escobar had met with AUC top commanders in northern Colombia to negotiate cheaper land in the region of Caucasia and in the Department of Sucre. Uribe-Escobar responded to this saying that he did not have any land in Caucasia or Sahagún but he did have land of his property between the towns of Sahagún and Ciénaga de Oro in the Department of Córdoba which were acquired in 1991.

=== Testimony of Salvatore Mancuso ===
Imprisoned AUC paramilitary leader Salvatore Mancuso confessed during a court session that he had met with Uribe-Escobar in two occasions with the purpose of forming a political coalition with then Senator of Colombia, Eleonora Pineda for the 2002 Colombian legislative election. Mancuso said that he had asked Pineda to introduce him. Pineda was later accepted into the Democratic Colombia Party, but before the 2006 Colombian presidential election Pineda was expelled.

=== Arrest warrant ===
A Delegated Attorney to the Supreme Court of Colombia found enough merits and evidence to issue an arrest warrant against Uribe-Escobar without a right to pay a fine. Uribe-Escobar was syndicated of "concert to commit crimes" consisting on agreeing to promote illegal armed groups. He had been accused by the Supreme Court but since Uribe-Escobar had renounced from his post as senator, ordinary justice could put him on trial. After receiving the notification Uribe-Escobar announced to the Colombian authorities that he was going to surrender voluntarily and comply with the mandate of the Attorney General of Colombia.

=== End of penalty ===
Uribe was set free of prison on November 15, 2012. He spent 54 months in jail.
