= John P. Flannery II =

American attorney

- Born: New York City, US
- Education: Fordham University (BS); Columbia Engineering (BS); Columbia Law School (JD); George Washington School of Business (MSIS)
- Occupation: Lawyer

John P. Flannery II is a practicing American attorney who also hosts a daily YouTube broadcast and is a frequent guest commentator on television. In 1982, he was the unsuccessful Democratic candidate for Congress in VA-10, and in 2007 he published a book criticizing the government's regulatory approach to pain management.

== Early life and education ==
John P. Flannery was born in The Bronx, New York, where he learned at a tender age how to fight for himself and for the causes he cares about. He graduated from Fordham University in 1968 with a BS in Physics, and obtained a second BA in Industrial Engineering in 1969 and a JD in Law in 1972 from Columbia University. He received an MSIS in Information Science from the George Washington School of Business in 2002.

== Career ==
=== Law Clerk, Federal Prosecutor, and Private Practice ===
Flannery began his legal career in 1972–74 as a Law Clerk in the United States District Court for the Southern District of New York where he was assigned to assist in processing and analyzing the pleadings of pro se litigants. His conclusion from this experience was that pro se petitioners are unfairly and mistakenly denigrated, and play a valuable role in the court system.

From 1974 to 1979, as Assistant U.S. Attorney in the SDNY working under the leadership of Paul J. Curran and Robert B. Fiske, Flannery was prosecutor in widely publicized criminal cases that included the bribery of Congressman Daniel Flood by a rabbi, and heroin-trafficking by major organized crime figures including "Matty" Madonna.

From 1979 to 1983, he was in private practice in the firm of Poletti Freidin Prashker Feldman & Gartner, during which time he accepted several appointments as Special Counsel to US Senate Committees.

Flannery co-founded the law firm of Campbell Flannery in 1988. In a much-publicized and celebrated case, he appealed the 2004 Florida criminal conviction of Richard Paey (a chronic pain patient) for illegal possession of narcotics, and in 2007 won exoneration and a full pardon for Paey from Governor Charlie Crist. From 1997 to 2001, he took leave from the firm to work on several Congressional assignments.

=== Congressional staff and candidacy ===
In 1980, the Senate Judiciary Committee learned of alleged "inadequacies" in the DOJ's undercover investigation of possible attempts by fugitive Robert Vesco to bribe high-level US officials, and was suspicious about its decision to neither appoint a special prosecutor nor indict anyone in the matter. In response, the Committee launched its own extensive investigation and hearings on DOJ's performance. Flannery was then hired as Special Counsel to review the investigation's tentative findings, to conduct remaining depositions and interviews, and to draft the 1982 staff report.

In 1982-83, as Special Counsel to the Senate Committee on Labor and Human Resources, Flannery investigated the FBI's withholding of information that might have cast doubt on the fitness of Raymond J. Donovan to be Secretary of Labor. He authored the Committee's report on the matter, which only addressed the FBI's performance and not the question of whether Donovan was guilty of any crime.

In 1984, Flannery ran unsuccessfully for Congress in VA-10, losing to Frank Wolf in the third of his eventual eighteen terms in office.

In 1997-98, Flannery was Special Counsel and Project Director, American Worker Project of the House Education and Labor Committee in support of the Workforce Investment Act of 1998. In 1998-99, as Special Counsel to the House Judiciary Committee, Flannery worked with the Democratic minority defending against the Impeachment of Bill Clinton. In 1999-2001, Flannery was Special Counsel and Chief of Staff for Congresswoman Zoe Lofgren.

=== Author and commentator ===
Flannery has published scholarly law review articles on the subjects of commercial information brokers, Supreme Court habeas corpus jurisprudence, unwarranted pejorative attitudes toward pro se litigation no-parole prison policy, and the responsibility of government for student deaths due to its failure to enforce existing gun laws. In 2002, he opined on the unconstitutionality of the Guantnamo military tribunals established by President Bush in the immediate aftermath of the 9/11 attacks, and later ruled improper in Hamdan v. Rumsfeld.

His involvement in the case of Richard Paey led him to write the book Pain in America - and how our government makes it worse! In this book, Flannery asserts that the government wrongfully criminalizes chronic-pain patients and their physicians, which he argues is an unconstitutional violation of constitutional privacy rights that results in woeful under-treatment of chronic pain. He has testified before Congress as an expert witness on the subject of drug enforcement.

Flannery has published eighty short essays in Medium, has recorded more than twenty audio podcasts, and has been posting fifteen-minute videos during his daily walks since August 2020. He is a frequent guest commentator for legal matters on MS NOW, on other networks, and in public conversation series.

Flannery lives near the site of the suspect 1940 Lovettsville air disaster that killed Nazi-sympathizing Senator Ernest Lundeen, and produced a 2016 documentary that features first-hand accounts of the incident by his aging neighbors.

== Personal life ==
Flannery lives on a farm in Lovettsville, Virginia with his wife Holly, where she raises rescued pigs that as vegans they don't eat. He is a lover of nature, and is an active elected representative of the Loudoun County Soil and Water Conservation District.
