= Francisco Santos Calderón =

Colombian politician and journalist

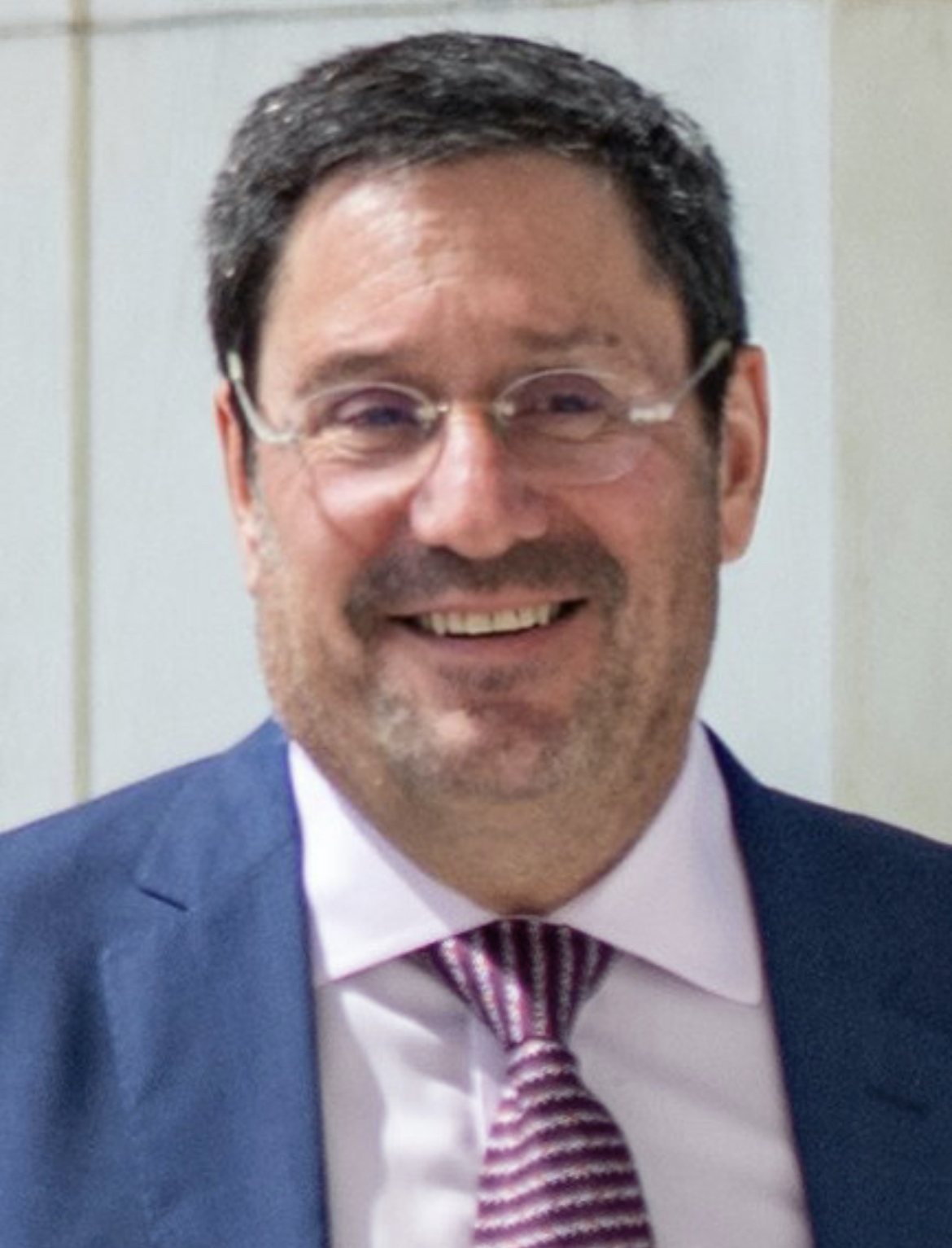

8th Vice President of Colombia
- In office 7 August 2002 – 7 August 2010
- President: Álvaro Uribe
- Preceded by: Gustavo Bell
- Succeeded by: Angelino Garzón

42nd Colombian Ambassador to the United States
- In office 6 September 2018 – 17 January 2020
- President: Iván Duque
- Preceded by: Camilo Reyes Rodríguez
- Succeeded by: Juan Carlos Pinzón

Personal details
- Born: Francisco Santos Calderón; 14 October 1961 (age 64) Bogotá, D.C., Colombia
- Party: Democratic Center
- Spouse: María Victoria García
- Education: University of Kansas; University of Texas at Austin
- Occupation: Journalist, Professor

Francisco Santos Calderón (born 14 October 1961), also known as Pacho Santos, is a Colombian politician and journalist. Santos was elected as Álvaro Uribe's running mate and became Vice President in 2002. Santos was re-elected in 2006 for a second term with President Uribe. His great-uncle Eduardo Santos was President of Colombia from 1938 to 1942 and he is also a cousin of former president Juan Manuel Santos. Santos was appointed Ambassador of Colombia to the United States in 2018. He presented his credentials to president Donald Trump on 17 September 2018 and served until 2020.

== Biography ==
=== Education ===
Santos, like his cousin, ex-President of Colombia Juan Manuel Santos, attended high school at Colegio San Carlos a private all-male elite school in Bogotá. Both are also graduates of the University of Kansas in Lawrence, Kansas, United States.

Santos also graduated from the University of Texas at Austin and was a Nieman Fellow at Harvard.

=== Kidnapping ===
In 1990 the Medellín Cartel led by Pablo Escobar kidnapped him to pressure the Colombian government to revert its support of drug lords' extraditions to the United States.

=== Human rights advocate ===
Upon his return, Santos became an advocate of human rights in Colombia, especially those of victims affected by kidnapping after he himself suffered from this practice. He created a non-governmental organisation called Fundación Pais Libre (Free Country Foundation), with the intentions of advancing awareness and helping the victims and their families. However, he has been criticised due to polemic declarations that support repression against students involved in protests.

=== Plan Colombia ===
2007 in an interview for the film documentary The War on Drugs Santos defends Plan Colombia and the use of aerial fumigation as a tool for Coca eradication in Colombia.

=== Shared Responsibility ===
Since 2008, Santos has spoken as part of the Shared Responsibility campaign to raise public awareness of cocaine production's impacts on Colombia's forest biodiversity, including deforestation and chemical contamination. The campaign links cocaine use to environmental destruction.

=== Ambassador of Colombia to the United States of America ===
Santos served as Ambassador of Colombia to the United States of America in Washington D.C. from September 2018 to 2020. He was succeeded by Juan Carlos Pinzón.

== Popular culture ==
- In TV series Pablo Escobar, The Drug Lord is portrayed by the Colombian actor Gustavo Ángel as the character of Fernán Santana.

Diplomatic posts
Preceded by Camilo Reyes Rodríguez	Colombian Ambassador to the United States; 2018–2020	Succeeded by Juan Carlos Pinzón
Political offices
Preceded by Gustavo Bell	Vice President of Colombia; 2002–2010	Succeeded by Angelino Garzón
Party political offices
New political party	Colombia First nominee for Vice President of Colombia; 2002, 2006	Party dissolved
Order of precedence
Preceded by Gustavo Bell as former vice president	Order of precedence of Colombia former vice president	Succeeded by Angelino Garzón as former vice president
