= Horacio Serpa =

Colombian politician (1943–2020)

Horacio Serpa Uribe
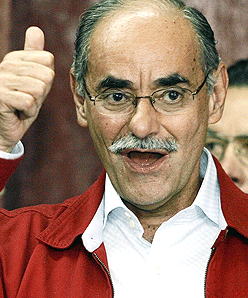
- Serpa campaigning in 2006

Senator of Colombia
- In office 20 July 2014 – 20 July 2018
- In office 1985–1988

Governor of Santander
- In office 1 January 2008 – 1 January 2012
- Preceded by: Hugo Heliodoro Aguilar Naranjo
- Succeeded by: Richard Alfonso Aguilar Villa

Permanent Representative of Colombia to the Organization of American States
- In office 10 March 2003 – 24 September 2004
- President: Álvaro Uribe
- Preceded by: Humberto de la Calle Lombana
- Succeeded by: Alvaro Tirado Mejía

1st Minister of the Interior
- In office 1994–1997
- President: Ernesto Samper
- Preceded by: Fabio Villegas Ramírez
- Succeeded by: Carlos Holmes Trujillo García

Co-President of the Constituent Assembly of Colombia
- In office 5 February 1991 – 4 July 1991 Serving with Álvaro Gómez Hurtado and Antonio Navarro Wolff
- Preceded by: Office created
- Succeeded by: Office abolished

Inspector General of Colombia
- In office 1988–1989
- President: Virgilio Barco Vargas
- Succeeded by: Alfonso Gómez Méndez

Minister of Government
- In office 1990–1990
- President: Virgilio Barco Vargas
- Preceded by: Carlos A Lemos Simmonds
- Succeeded by: Julio César Sánchez García

Member of the Colombian Chamber of Representatives
- In office 1974–1985
- Preceded by: Rogelio Ayala
- Constituency: Santander

Personal details
- Born: Horacio Serpa Uribe; 4 January 1943 Bucaramanga, Santander, Colombia
- Died: 31 October 2020 (aged 77) Bucaramanga, Santander, Colombia
- Party: Liberal
- Spouse: Rosa Moncada Ruiz(1974—present)
- Children: Sandra Serpa Moncada; Rosa Serpa Moncada; Horacio Serpa Moncada
- Education: University of Atlantico
- Profession: Lawyer, politician

Horacio Serpa Uribe (4 January 1943 – 31 October 2020) was a Colombian lawyer, politician and senator. Serpa ran as the Colombian Liberal Party candidate for president on three occasions; in 1998, 2002, and 2006. He previously served as congressman for Santander as senator, Inspector General of Colombia, president of the National Constituent Assembly, Minister of the Interior, and as ambassador to the Organization of American States. He was also involved in the 8000 process scandal in which money from the Cali Cartel entered the presidential campaign of Liberal candidate Ernesto Samper. In 2007 Serpa ran for the governorship of Santander Department and was elected on 28 October in the regional elections.

== Political career ==
Horacio Serpa worked in three branches of government in Colombia. After graduating as a lawyer from the Universidad del Atlántico in Barranquilla, Serpa went back to his native Santander Department and became a judge for the town of Tona. He later became a Penal Judge in the town of San Vicente de Chucurí and then Civil Municipal Judge in Barrancabermeja. In Barrancabermeja, Serpa also served as Criminal Investigator, Circuit Penal Judge and Superior Judge. During this time Serpa became interested in politics and began participating actively in the Liberal Revolutionary Movement (MRL) as member of the youths, this movement had been founded by Alfonso López Michelsen.

Serpa concentrated his political efforts in the Magdalena medio (Middle Magdalena Region), a convulsed region in which the ELN guerrilla was born. In 1970 Serpa was appointed Mayor of Barrancabermeja by Alfonso Gómez Gómez and later became secretary of education for the Santander Department.

In the legislative branch, Serpa served as councilman for the town of Barrancabermeja and later as National Chamber of Representatives member representing Santander Department as replacement for congressman Rogelio Ayala in 1974. Serpa was re-elected for the periods of 1978 and 1982 under a movement founded by him, the Authentic Liberal Leftist Front (Frente de Izquierda Liberal Auténtico, FILA) aligned with the official Liberal party.

In the Chamber of Representatives, Serpa became President of the Accusations Commission and President of the Congress of the Republic Plan Commission. In 1985 Serpa ran for the senate and was elected. In 1998, Serpa was appointed Inspector General of Colombia. He also served as Minister of Government, Minister of Interior, Presidential Peace Advisor and Ministry Delegate in Presidential Functions during the Liberal presidencies of Virgilio Barco (1986–1990) and Ernesto Samper (1994–1998).

Serpa was later elected to the National Constituent Assembly in 1991 in which he shared a collegiate presidency with Antonio Navarro Wolff (former member of the M-19 guerrillas) and Álvaro Gómez Hurtado (representative of the Conservative Party) to create the Colombian Constitution of 1991.

After the creation of the new constitution, Serpa continued as President of Liberal Directorate in Santander Department and President of the Central Politics Commission of the Liberal Party. He was then a prospect for presidential candidate in 1998, but was shaded by Ernesto Samper. Serpa was then elected National Director of the Liberal party for the period 1998 to 1999. During the government of Álvaro Uribe, Serpa was appointed ambassador of Colombia to the Organization of American States (OAS) and he also disputed the presidential bids of 2002 and 2006.

== 8000 Process involvement ==
In 1981 Serpa met Ernesto Samper Pizano, who was working as debate chief of Alfonso López Michelsen's second presidential campaign, and became good friends. For the presidential campaign of 1990 Samper became a candidate and Serpa collaborated with his efforts in the Santander Department, his region of influence, while being the leader of his movement: the FILA. But Samper lost the elections.

In the 1994 elections, Serpa became Debate Chief of Samper's presidential campaign, and this time Samper was elected president of Colombia. On 20 June 1994, the opposing presidential candidate Andrés Pastrana then made public the Narcocassettes a series of telephone recordings in which members of the Cali drug cartel mainly journalist Alberto Giraldo talked with Gilberto and Miguel Rodríguez Orejuela regarding the financing of the Samper campaign for the presidency.

The Supreme Court then opened an investigation, which was dubbed the Proceso 8000. Serpa defended Samper against these allegations of drug money entering the campaign, in which he was also involved. The relations with the United States government, a major contributor to the drug effort in Colombia deteriorated. Samper and most of his collaborators were absolved from any wrongdoing, with the exception of Fernando Botero and Santiago Medina. But the scandal involved a dozen members of Congress and numerous politicians and businessmen with the Cali cartel. After this incident Serpa's credibility maintained a low level with Colombians for supporting Samper, as well as responding to criticism with aggravating words.

== Peace negotiator ==
During his time as congressman, Serpa was always assisting and representing the government in conflicts between worker unions, social conflicts and the government, mainly in the Santander Department where he had his political niche. Serpa has always been in favor of a peacefully negotiated solution. During the government of Belisario Betancur, Serpa was invited to be a negotiator between the ELN guerrillas and was part of numerous peace commissions that never achieved successful results.

During the government of Virgilio Barco, Serpa was appointed Minister of Government, in which he collaborated in setting a demobilization timetable for the EPL, the PRT and the Quintín Lame Movement. In 1992 under the government of César Gaviria Serpa led the failed negotiation attempts with the ELN guerrillas in Tlaxcala, Mexico.

During the government of Samper, Serpa intended to negotiate with the FARC guerrillas. The group asked for the demilitarization of La Uribe, Meta, a region in central Colombia, but were unsuccessful. Serpa opposed the CONVIVIR groups created by Fernando Botero, a group of self-defense groups intended to improve security in areas where the government couldn't reach. Despite his opposition, the plan of the CONVIVIR was approved. He then traveled to Bonn, Germany, where the Colombian government and local government of Bonn were again trying to negotiate with the ELN guerrillas, but these peace talks also failed.

== Presidential campaign results for Serpa ==
=== 1998 ===
First round

- Horacio Serpa U. (Vice: María Emma Mejía): 3,647,007 (34.64%)
- Andrés Pastrana (Vice: Gustavo Bell): 3,613,278 (34.32%)

Second round

- Andrés Pastrana: 6,086,507 (50.39%)
- Horacio Serpa: 5,620,719 (46.53%)

=== 2002 ===
- Álvaro Uribe (Vice: Francisco Santos Calderón): 5.862.655 (53.048%)
- Horacio Serpa: (Vice: José Gregorio Hernández Galindo): 3.514.779 (31.803%)

This election was won by Álvaro Uribe by a majority vote of half plus one vote, which according to the 1991 Constitution made a secondary election unnecessary. After these negative results for his political career, Serpa said that he would never run for the presidency ever again. A few years later he changed his position and after quitting his post as ambassador to the Organization of American States (OAS), he decided to run again for the presidency. In 2005, he was appointed vice-president of the Socialist International.

=== 2006 ===
On 12 March 2006 Serpa was selected as candidate for the Colombian Liberal Party for the presidency of Colombia.

- Álvaro Uribe (vice president: Francisco Santos): 7,397,835 (62.35%)
- Carlos Gaviria (vice president: Patricia Lara): 2,613,157 (22.02%)
- Horacio Serpa: (vice president: Luis Iván Marulanda Gómez): 1,404,235 (11.83%)

=== Candidate for Governor of Santander ===
On 28 October 2007 Serpa was elected Governor of the Department of Santander by popular vote in the regional elections. He took office on 1 January 2008.

== See also ==
- Ernesto Samper
- 8000 Process
- Cali Cartel
