= Iván Marulanda =

Colombian politician and economist

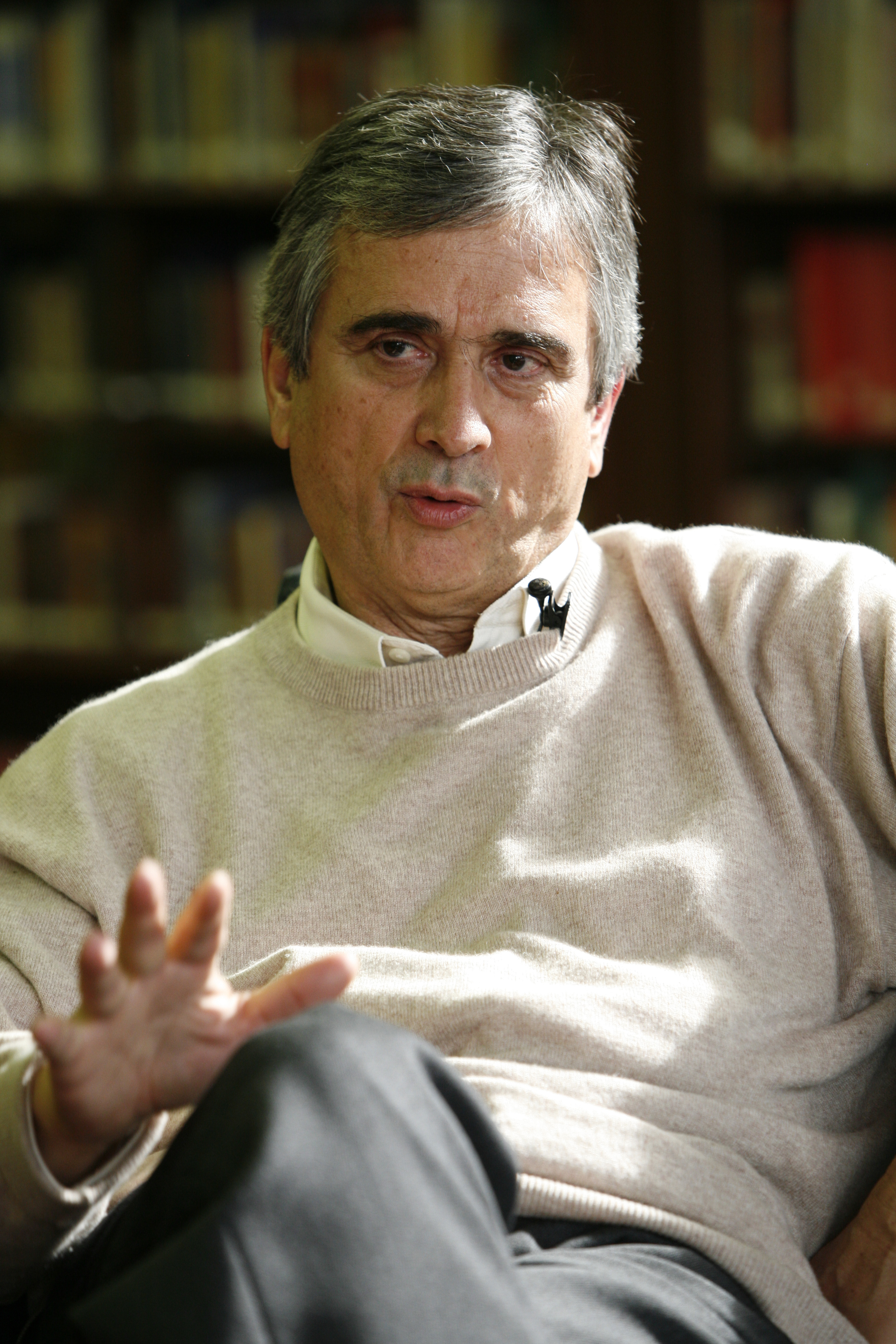

Ambassador of Colombia to the United Nations Agencies for Food and Agriculture
- In office 1991–1992
- President: Cesar Gaviria

Member of Constituent Assembly of Colombia
- In office February 5, 1991 – June 1, 1991
- President: Cesar Gaviria

Senator of the Republic of Colombia
- In office 1986–1990
- President: Virgilio Barco Vargas

City Councillor of Medellín
- In office January 1, 1984 – January 1, 1985

Mayor of Pereira
- In office January 1, 1974 – January 1, 1975

Personal details
- Born: Luis Iván Marulanda Gómez; June 4, 1946 (age 80) Pereira, Colombia
- Party: Green Alliance
- Other political affiliations: Liberal Party; Compromiso Ciuadadano (current)
- Children: Two
- Education: University of Antioquia
- Profession: Economist, politician

Luis Iván Marulanda Gómez (born June 4, 1946) is a Colombian politician and economist. He was elected senator for the Colombian Green Party for the 2018–2022 term. He was previously a member of Colombian Liberal Party, where he was elected senator for four years (1986–1990). Liberals nominated him for Vice President of Colombia in the 2006 presidential election.

== Life and career ==
Marulanda was born in Pereira, Risaralda, and graduated with an economics degree from the University of Antioquia. He served as the mayor of Pereira in 1974 and then became the general secretary at the Ministry of Economic Development. During this period he became involved directly with Luis Carlos Galán and his New Liberalism movement.

As part of New Liberalism, he was the campaign director of the movement in Antioquia and was elected city councillor of Medellín, the second largest city in Colombia and the capital of the Antioquia Department. In his role as campaign director for Antioquia, he was the person who warned Galan that Pablo Escobar wanted to infiltrate the movement to become a politician. This led to Luis Carlos Galán denouncing Escobar on the stage and denying Escobar membership of the movement.

In 1986, he was elected Senator alongside Luis Carlos Galán. In 1987, the New Liberalism movement decided to rejoin the Liberal Party. Marulanda was elected a member of the Constituent assembly in 1991, charged with drafting the Colombian Constitution of 1991 after president Cesar Gaviria and Congress decided to dissolve the Constitution of 1886.

After the new constitution was drafted and the constituent assembly dissolved, Marulanda was appointed by Cesar Gaviria as an ambassador to the United Nations in 1991. He also held the diplomatic post of Ambassador to the United Nations Agencies for Food and Agriculture between 1992 and 1994.

In 2002, he became part of the National Council of the Liberal Party and in 2006 he was chosen as the Liberal nominee for vice president, running alongside Horacio Serpa. They finished third, behind incumbent president Alvaro Uribe and the newly formed left wing party Alternative Democratic Pole. He was a candidate for president in the 2010 election but lost out on Liberal Party nomination to former Defence Minister and Senator Rafael Pardo.

Marulanda served as an adviser to Sergio Fajardo during his tenure as governor of the Antioquia Department from 2012 to 2016.
