= The War on Drugs (film) =

2007 film by Sebastian J. F.

- Directed by: Sebastian J. F.
- Written by: Fate
- Produced by: Sebastian J. F.
- Starring: Sharanda Jones; Richard Paey; Kevin C. Whaley; Flora T. Francisco Santos Calderón; Jorge Enrique Botero; Ethan Nadelmann
- Distributed by: Parallel Universe
- Release date: October 12, 2007 (Austria)
- Running time: 99 min.
- Languages: English and Spanish

The War on Drugs is a film documentary on the war on drugs. It shows how the war on drugs is being fought on various fronts: In Colombia the film follows the efforts to eradicate the coca and poppy plants under Plan Colombia. In the United States the cases of Richard Paey and Sharanda Jones illustrate the effects for individuals and society. Above all hovers the Drug Enforcement Administration.

The films first public screening was on March 20, 2007 at the Diagonale film festival in Graz, Austria. It was theatrically released in Austria on October 12, 2007 and in Spain on January 17, 2008. The film was also immediately released on the Internet via doc-air, an Internet download platform which became part of DOC Alliance in 2009.

The War on Drugs is the second film from Parallel Universe.

== See also ==
- Plan Colombia
- Pablo Escobar
