= Álvaro García Romero =

Colombian politician

Senator of Colombia
- In office 20 July 1994 – 19 July 2007
- Succeeded by: Luzelena Restrepo Betancourt

Chamber of Representatives of Colombia
- In office 20 July 1978 – 9 July 1990

Personal details
- Born: February 19, 1951 (age 75) Ovejas, Sucre, Colombia
- Party: Democratic Colombia
- Occupation: Politician

Álvaro Alfonso García Romero (Ovejas, February 19, 1951) is a Colombian politician who was a member of the Colombia Democratic Party, and was elected by popular vote to join the Senate and the House of Representatives of Colombia.

He was captured on November 18, 2007 within the scandal known as parapolitics, and sentenced in 2010 to 40 years in prison for diverting public funds to form far-right paramilitary groups and for being the indirect author, according to sentence with file 32805 of February 23, 2010 of the Supreme Court, of the Massacre of 15 people in Macayepo.

== Biography ==
Álvaro García was born in Ovejas, Sucre, and grew up on his family's cattle and agriculture farms. His family is originally from Carmen de Bolívar.

=== Macayepo massacre ===
On May 18, 2002, in a debate in Congress on paramilitary politics, Senator Gustavo Petro showed documentary and audio evidence that indicated García Romero had ties to paramilitary groups in Sucre and was involved in the Macayepo massacre, a mass murder carried out on October 16, 2000 by the illegal far-right armed organization known as the United Self-Defense Forces of Colombia (AUC) in the Macayepo district, in the jurisdiction of Carmen de Bolívar in the department of Bolívar in northern Colombia, where 15 peasants were murdered with machetes, sticks and rocks and nearly 246 families were displaced from their territory. Senator García went to the lectern and loudly called Petro a “clown,” denying the accusations. His case was now being investigated by the Supreme Court of Justice.

In February 2010, García Romero was found responsible for being the intellectual author of the massacre and other events related to paramilitarism, such as the murder of San Onofre teacher Georgina Narváez, who had denounced electoral fraud in the department of Sucre. García was sentenced to 40 years in prison. On February 25, 2021, the Special Jurisdiction for Peace (JEP) accepted García into its jurisdiction but expelled him in 2022 due to his refusal to acknowledge his participation in the events for which he was convicted.

== Political career ==
García stood out in controversial acts in Congress such as the one that took place in 1988: García was a representative to the House and was the protagonist of a trap to benefit the country's landowners. and prevent the implementation of President Virgilio Barco's agrarian reform. Each parliamentarian could vote only once and television cameras captured the moment when García put his hand in the ballot box and deposited several blank ballots. Despite the fact that there were more votes than congressmen, the 'mico' was approved.

=== Congressman from Colombia ===
In the 1978 Colombian legislative elections, García Romero was elected to the Colombian House of Representatives with a total of 27,639 votes and re-elected for three consecutive terms.

In the 1998 Colombian legislative elections, García Romero was elected Senator of the Republic of Colombia with a total of 45,475 votes. Re-elected again in the 2002 Colombian legislative elections, García Romero was elected Senator of the Republic of Colombia with a total of 70,662 votes. Then in the 2006 Colombian legislative elections, García Romero was re-elected Senator with a total of 55,573 votes.

- Proposes some amendments to the current legislation on the protection of the rights of authors, composers and performers of musical works (Archived).

=== Political parties ===
Throughout his career he has represented the following parties:

Political party	Start Date	End Date
Partido Colombia Democrática	20	
National Progressive Movement	20	19

=== Public offices ===
Among the public offices held by Alvaro Alfonso Garcia Romero, the following are identified:

Public office	Political party	Start Date	End Date
Senator of the Republic	Democratic Colombia Party	20	19
Senator of the Republic	National Progressive Movement	20	19
Senator of the Republic		20	19
Representative to the House		20	19
Representative to the House		20	19
Representative to the House		20	19
Representative to the House			
Sincelejo Councillor			

== See also ==
- es:Álvaro García Romero
