= Richard Paey =

American who received a pardon from the governor of Florida, U.S.

Richard Paey is a man from the U.S. state of Florida who was falsely incarcerated in 2004 for drug trafficking. There was no evidence he ever distributed or intended to sell any pills, but drug laws in many states, including Florida, allow officials to prosecute for trafficking based solely on the quantity an individual possesses. Paey spent three and a half years in prison, until he was granted a full pardon by Florida Governor Charlie Crist in September 2007.

== Arrest and trial ==
Prosecutors said that Paey "could not possibly have been taking 25 pills a day himself" and charged him with possession with intent to sell.

In 1985, Paey was involved in an automobile accident. A subsequent botched operation left him in nearly constant pain. Like many chronic pain patients, over the years he gradually developed a tolerance to the opioid painkillers he was using to alleviate his suffering. Detectives began their investigation of him in 1996. Due to the quantities of pills he was prescribed, it was believed he was trafficking the drugs. However, a three-month investigation turned up no evidence of intent to sell, and the quantities he was prescribed were not unusual for long-time users of opioids. Nonetheless, Florida law allows prosecution for trafficking based solely on the amount of drug the suspect possesses. Paey was arrested in March 1997.

According to prosecutors, investigators found a DEA number stamp and other equipment used to forge prescriptions in Paey's residence. However, according to Dr. Russell Portnoy, chairman of the Department of Pain Medicine at the Beth Israel Hospital in New York City, such behavior is typical of patients experiencing extreme chronic pain. When interviewed for 60 Minutes, he said these patients sometimes go to great lengths to ensure they never suffer a break in their pain treatment.

The lead prosecutor, Scott Andringa, offered Paey a plea deal in 1999 that would have resulted in a guilty plea of attempted trafficking and 3 years of house arrest, but he chose to fight the charges. A similar plea was offered during his first trial in 2002, but it was quickly rescinded after Paey accepted it. Paey was eventually convicted in his third trial on 15 counts of drug trafficking, possession of a controlled substance, and obtaining a controlled substance by fraud. On April 16, 2004, he was sentenced to a 25-year mandatory minimum prison sentence and a $500,000 fine.

Later, Dwayne Hillis, one of the jurors in the trial, came forward publicly and said he was pressured into a guilty verdict with assurances that Richard Paey would serve no jail term.

Paey served three and a half years at the Tomoka Correctional facility in Daytona Beach, Florida. During this time, the state provided an intrathecal pump delivering morphine directly into his back to alleviate his pain.

== Pardon ==
After succeeding Florida Governor Jeb Bush, Governor Charlie Crist granted Paey a waiver of the requirement that a minimum period of the sentence be served on his clemency petition, permitting his petition to be heard by the clemency board immediately. The board recommended denying clemency for Paey. Nevertheless, in a sudden and unexpected move, Governor Crist and the Cabinet unanimously granted Paey a full pardon on the morning of September 20, 2007. Paey was freed from prison at 2:51 pm.

Paey's case is the subject of the book Pain In America and the film documentary The War on Drugs, and was featured on the Showtime series Penn & Teller: Bullshit!
