= 1978 Colombian parliamentary election =

Parliamentary elections were held in Colombia on 26 February 1978 to elect the Senate and Chamber of Representatives. The result was a victory for the Liberal Party, which won 111 of the 199 Chamber seats and 62 of the 112 Senate seats.

== Results ==
=== Senate ===
Party	Votes	%	Seats	+/–
Colombian Liberal Party	2,297,534	55.23	62	–4
Colombian Conservative Party	1,650,429	39.68	49	+12
National Opposition Union	126,553	3.04	1	–1
People's Unity Front	49,058	1.18	0	New
Others	36,272	0.87	0	–
Total	4,159,846	100.00	112	0
Valid votes	4,159,846	99.76		
Invalid/blank votes	9,988	0.24		
Total votes	4,169,834	100.00		
Registered voters/turnout	12,519,719	33.31		
Source: Nohlen

=== Chamber of Representatives ===
Party	Votes	%	Seats	+/–
Colombian Liberal Party	2,302,230	55.20	111	–2
Colombian Conservative Party	1,645,496	39.45	83	+17
National Opposition Union	128,516	3.08	4	–1
People's Unity Front	50,008	1.20	1	New
Others	44,825	1.07	0	–
Total	4,171,075	100.00	199	0
Valid votes	4,171,075	99.78		
Invalid/blank votes	9,046	0.22		
Total votes	4,180,121	100.00		
Registered voters/turnout	12,519,719	33.39		
Source: Nohlen

Within Liberal ranks, lists supporting presidential pre-candidate Julio César Turbay Ayala soundly defeated lists supporting his rival for the party's nomination, former President Carlos Lleras Restrepo. This victory confirmed Turbay's candidacy as the official Liberal candidate for the June presidential election, in which he defeated Conservative candidate Belisario Betancur.
