= Camilo Reyes Rodríguez =

Colombian diplomat

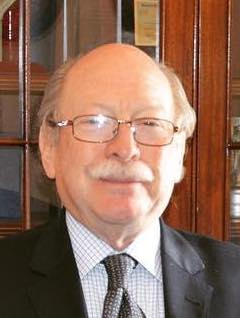
Camilo Reyes Rodríguez in 2017

Camilo Reyes Rodríguez is a Colombian diplomat and the former Colombian Ambassador to the United States.
