= Jorge Leyva Urdaneta =

Colombian lawyer, economist and politician

Minister of Public Works
- In office 7 August 1950 – 13 June 1953
- President: Laureano Gómez
- Preceded by: Víctor Archila Briceño
- Succeeded by: Santiago Trujillo Gómez

Governor of Cundinamarca
- In office 6 October 1949 – 7 August 1950
- Preceded by: Gonzalo Gaitán Azuero
- Succeeded by: Alfonso Barragan

Minister of Commerce and Industry
- In office 8 May 1949 – 6 October 1949
- President: Mariano Ospina Pérez
- Preceded by: José del Carmen Meza
- Succeeded by: Alfonso Restrepo Moreno

Personal details
- Born: Jorge Leyva Urdaneta; 4 July 1912 Bogotá, Colombia
- Died: 23 December 1986 (aged 74) Bogotá, Colombia
- Resting place: Central Cemetery of Bogotá
- Party: Conservative
- Spouse: María Durán Laserna
- Children: María Cristina; Fernando; Álvaro; Jorge
- Parent(s): Lisandro Leyva Mezura; Elvira Urdaneta García
- Education: Pontifical Xavierian University (BBA)

Jorge Leyva Urdaneta (4 July 1912 - 23 December 1968) was a Colombian lawyer, economist and politician.

Leyva, was Minister of Commerce and Industry from May 8 to October 6, 1949, under President Mariano Ospina Pérez, later served as Governor of Cundinamarca from 1949 to 1950, and finally Minister of Public Works from 1930 to 1953 under President Laureano Gómez.

In 1953, the 18th President Laureano Gómez was deposed, so Leyva and his family were forced into exile until 1957, with the fall of the first and only military president of Colombia, the 19th President Gustavo Rojas Pinilla, Leyva Urdaneta attempted to reach the presidency with two attempts in 1958 and 1962, on both occasions being defeated by a candidate from the traditional Conservative and Liberal parties.

== Early life ==
Jorge Leyva Urdaneta was born in Bogotá, on July 4, 1912, to Lisandro Leyva Mezura and Elvira Urdaneta García, later that same year he would be baptized in the church of San Victorino on September 30, 1912,

Later he would study primary school at La Salle School, where he would study together with all his siblings until finishing, then he would continue his secondary school at the Momignies Institute in Belgium and later at the Saint-Josephs Academy in London. Years later he would return to Colombia to finish his Baccalaureate studies at the Colegio Mayor de San Bartolomé. And later he entered the Pontifical Xavierian University, where he received the Degree of Doctor in Legal and Economic Sciences.

He began his political career at the age of 25 as a Councilor of Bogotá in 1937, in 1939 he was a Deputy for the Assembly of Cundinamarca and later he was a representative to the Chamber and Senator of the Republic.
