= CONVIVIR =

Government created neighborhood watch organizations in Colombia

- Cooperativas para la Vigilancia y la Seguridad Privada
- Nickname: autodefensas

CONVIVIR (Cooperativas para la Vigilancia y la Seguridad Privada; its namesake “convivir” meaning "living in harmony" in Spanish) were rural neighborhood watch associations in Colombia created by the government in 1993 and officially abolished in 1999 after controversies over links to paramilitary groups. They were a reaction to the activities of guerilla movements in rural areas. The national CONVIVIR program was created in 1994 through Decree 356 under president César Gaviria. They have been compared to rondas campesinas in Peru and Civil Defense Patrols in Guatemala.

== History ==
Members of some former paramilitary groups transitioned into CONVIVIR, where they were joined by newer recruits and victims of guerrilla aggression, while others, such as the ACCU, remained operating independently. The then governor of Antioquia, Álvaro Uribe Velez (who later became President of Colombia), whose father had been killed by the FARC during a kidnapping attempt in 1983, gained notoriety for his open support and promotion of the CONVIVIR at the time.

Reports argued that some CONVIVIR groups achieved results in providing security to communities and intelligence coordination to military forces, but apparently numerous members committed abuses against civilians, without a serious oversight over their operations and organization. In 1998, HRW stated that "we have received credible information that indicated that the CONVIVIR groups of the Middle Magdalena and of the southern Cesar regions were directed by known paramilitaries and had threatened to assassinate Colombians that were considered as guerrilla sympathizers or which rejected joining the cooperative groups".

After much political debate, a November 1997 decision of Colombia's Constitutional Court stated that CONVIVIR members could not gather intelligence information and could not employ military grade weapons. Other restrictions included increasing legal supervision, and in early 1998 dozens of former CONVIVIR groups had their licenses revoked, because they did not turn in their weapons and withheld information about their personnel. Due to these measures, some gradually turned in their weapons and phased themselves out. 237 of the restricted weapons were returned to authorities by the end of 1997. Other members did not comply and later joined existing paramilitary groups.

According to a 2007 U.S. indictment against the fruit company Chiquita Brands International, a number of payments to the United Self-Defense Forces of Colombia passed through an "intermediary" CONVIVIR group which operated in the Urabá region.

== In popular culture ==
The groups were mentioned in the American TV crime drama Narcos, appearing in Episode 8 of Season 3 "Convivir".
