= Álvaro Leyva =

Colombian lawyer, economist, politician and diplomat

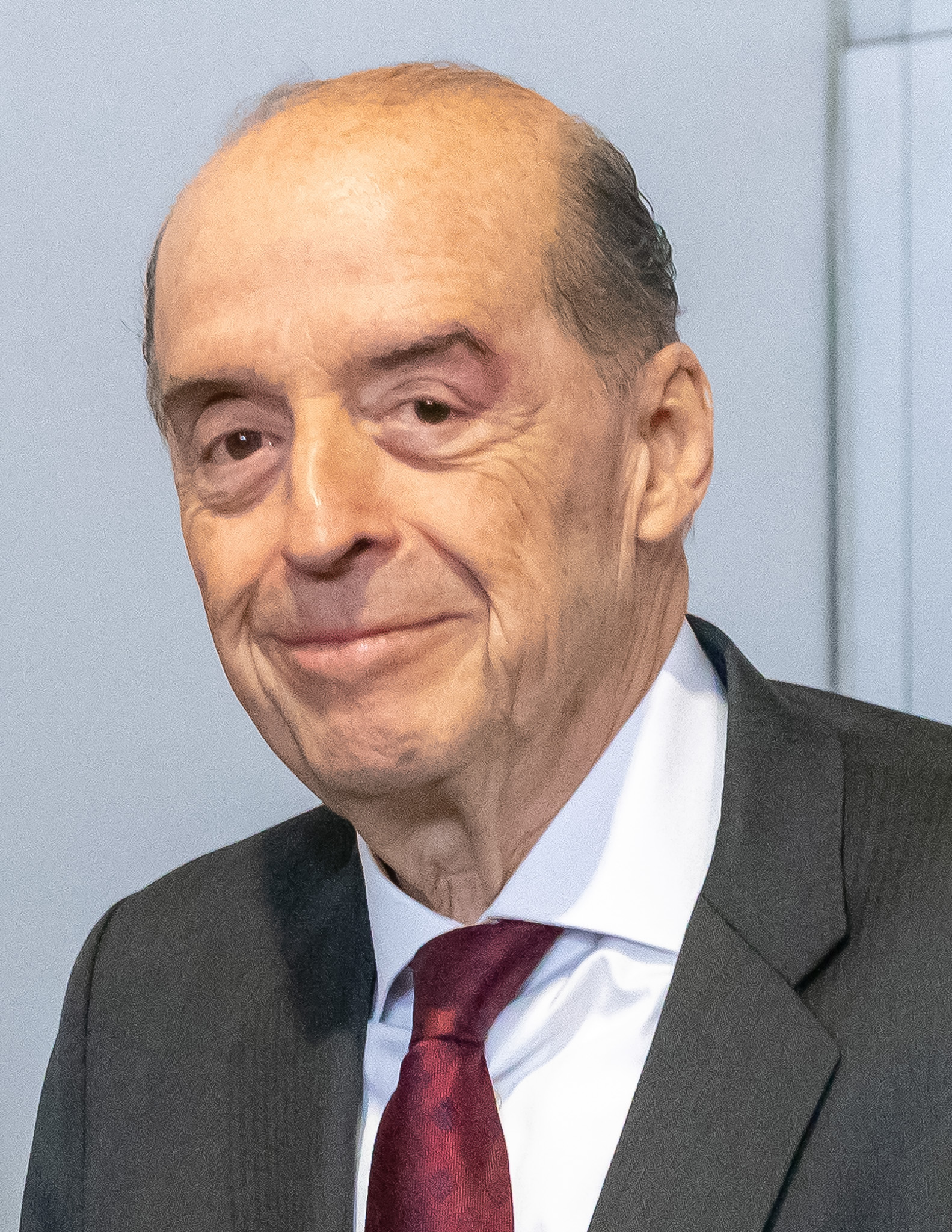

Minister of Foreign Affairs
- In office 7 August 2022 – 21 May 2024
- President: Gustavo Petro
- Preceded by: Marta Lucía Ramírez
- Succeeded by: Luis Gilberto Murillo

Member of the Constituent Assembly
- In office 2 February 1991 – 4 July 1991
- President: César Gaviria

Minister of Mines and Energy
- In office 20 July 1984 – 17 July 1985
- President: Belisario Betancur
- Preceded by: Carlos Martinez
- Succeeded by: Ivan Duque Escobar

Senator of Colombia
- In office 20 July 1982 – 20 July 1984
- In office 15 July 1985 – 20 July 1990

Member of the Chamber of Representatives
- In office 20 July 1978 – 20 July 1982
- Constituency: Capital District

Deputy of the Assembly of Cundinamarca
- In office 1 January 1976 – 1 January 1978

Councilor of Bogotá
- In office 1 January 1974 – 1 January 1976

Private Secretary of the Presidency
- In office 7 August 1970 – 7 August 1974
- President: Misael Pastrana

Personal details
- Born: Álvaro Leyva Durán; 26 August 1942 (age 84) Bogotá, Colombia
- Party: Conservative
- Spouse: Rosario Valenzuela
- Children: Jorge; María; Mariana
- Parent(s): Jorge Leyva Urdaneta; María Durán Laserna
- Education: Pontifical Xavierian University (BBA)

Álvaro Leyva Durán (born 26 August 1942) is a Colombian lawyer, economist, politician, human rights defender and diplomat. He was the Minister of Foreign Affairs for Colombia in the government of Gustavo Petro since 7 August 2022. On 7 February 2024, he was suspended from his ministerial position for three months over an investigation into potential violations of procurement laws.

Leyva has held various portfolios under different presidencies, including Minister of Mines and Energy; he has also been a Deputy of the Assembly of Cundinamarca, Councilor of Bogotá, Member of the Chamber of Representatives and a Member of the Constituent Assembly in 1991. His experience in mediation, in the armed conflict with the Illegal Armed Groups in Colombia, has led him to intervene in almost all presidential administrations as an advisor in the search for peace policies since 1982.

== Early life ==
=== Exiled in the United States ===
He attended primary school in Colombia, but had to complete his studies in New York, when, on 13 June 1953, General Gustavo Rojas Pinilla overthrew President Laureano Gómez (for whom his father Jorge has worked as minister since 1950).

== Peace mediator ==
=== Betancur government ===
President Betancur subsequently appointed him Minister of Mines and Energy in 1984 until 17 June 1985, when he was replaced by businessman Iván Duque Escobar (father of former president Iván Duque Márquez).

This closeness to the guerrilla groups and the establishment of friendships with the guerrilla leaders began to generate many accusations and criticisms, and he later earned the nickname "The True Foreign Minister of the FARC", comparing him to the guerrilla Rodrigo Granda, who had that nickname. Despite his closeness to the guerrillas, his peace efforts were in vain due to little state commitment, even being the victim of an attack in February 1986.

=== Samper government ===
Despite the failure of the peace process in 1992, the Liberals won the elections again, this time with Ernesto Samper. Leyva collaborated with the FARC in dialogues with the demilitarization of the municipality of La Uribe, but, as a result of the outbreak of the illegal financing scandal of the Samper campaign known as Process 8,000, the negotiations went to the background and finally the attempts to peace. He also helped implement the Protocols to the Geneva Conventions, which were signed in Colombia in 1995.

Leyva achieved the release in 1997 of 60 soldiers who were kidnapped at the Las Delicias base in 1996, and again attempted a peace agreement with the FARC, which was reached in 1998 with President Andrés Pastrana. However, he was involved in another scandal in 1997, since he and the liberal leader Juan Manuel Santos were holding talks with paramilitaries and guerrillas for the resignation of President Samper, but it did not go down well with the press that Santos and Leyva were traveling in a helicopter from the emerald Víctor Carranza to visit Carlos Castaño.

=== Pastrana government ===
Leyva participated in the first rapprochement between the government of Andrés Pastrana and the FARC-EP in the Caguan talks, and in fact, it was thanks to the photograph of Pastrana with Tirofijo that came out days before the second round presidential elections (product of a meeting sponsored by Leyva), that Pastrana won the presidency over the favorite Horacio Serpa.

However, prosecutor Alfonso Gómez Méndez accused him of illicit enrichment for money allegedly received from the Cali Cartel, and Leyva fled to Costa Rica, proving there that it was political persecution, for which he received political asylum there. country and the Office of the United Nations High Commissioner for Refugees granted him refugee status. He was captured in Madrid by Interpol on 23 October 2002 and was imprisoned for 2 months. Finally, after being acquitted by the Colombian Supreme Court of Justice, he returned to Colombia in 2006.

=== Uribe government ===
After the elections, Leyva continued to carry out peace efforts to reach a humanitarian agreement with the guerrillas during the second administration of President Uribe, with the knowledge and approval of the government.

In those days, however, the controversy awoke again, when emails from the dejected guerrilla leader Raúl Reyes were discovered in which Leyva is mentioned, and which would date from his time as presidential candidate in 2006, and in which there was talk of an exchange of former candidate Ingrid Betancourt if Leyva won the elections, and he, on the other hand, would adapt his government program to the postulates of the Eighth Conference of the FARC.

== Presidential candidacies ==
He was the promoter of the referendum in the Conservative Party, an initiative that other directors of that group (such as former President Pastrana) did not allow to prosper to stop his possible presidential aspiration in 1986, turning support towards Álvaro Gómez Hurtado. In the end, the liberal Virgilio Barco won the vote.

In the Barco government, Leyva created the Commission for the Promotion of the Reconciliation Policy, with the help of former presidents Alfonso López Michelsen and Pastrana, whose objective was to allow rapprochement between the government and the FARC. At that time, he was accused of financially benefiting from the kidnappings carried out by the FARC and his closeness to the insurgency ended up stigmatizing him forever.

=== Presidential candidature (1990) ===
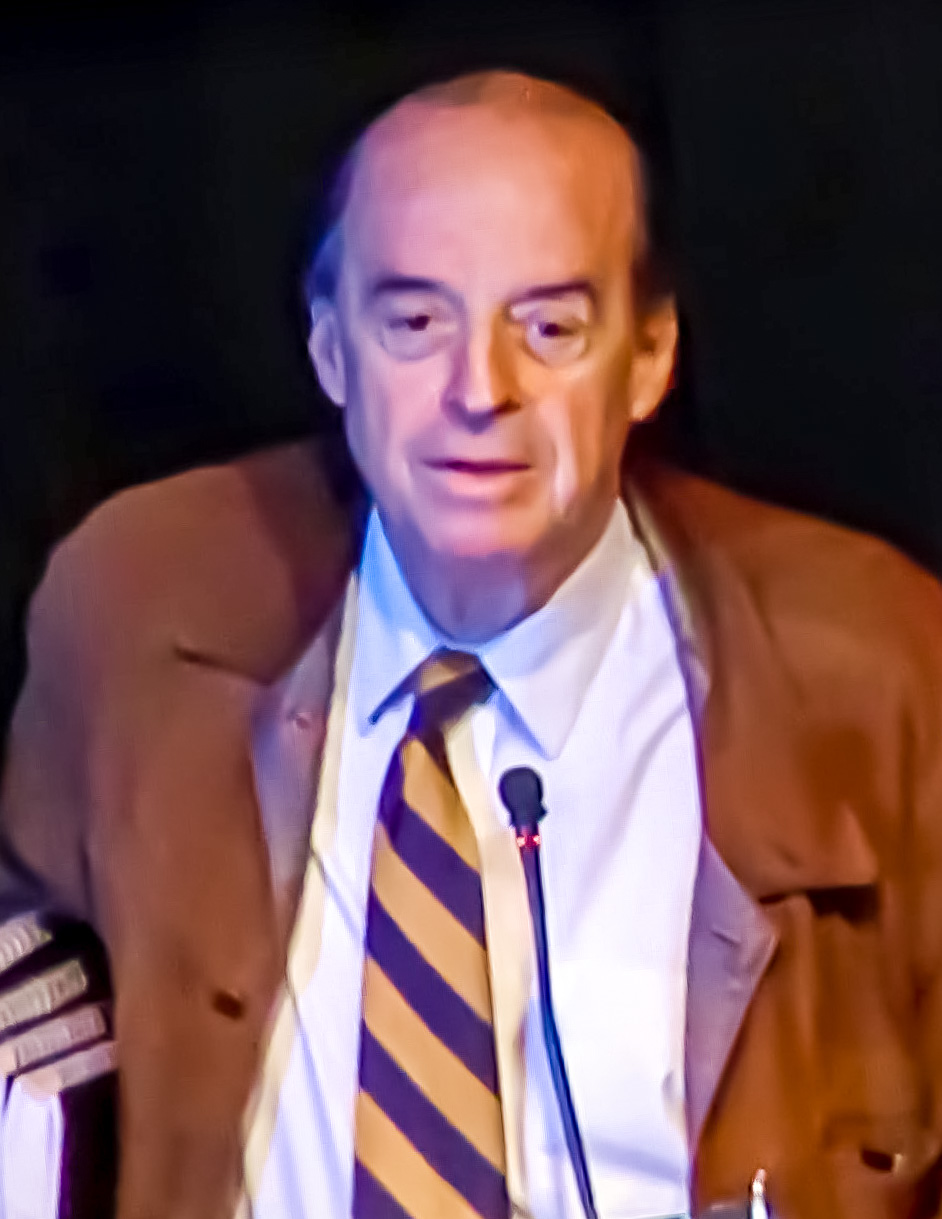
Álvaro Leyva at a conference at the Politécnico Grancolombiano

In 1989 he presented his presidential candidacy, endorsed by the controversial book War sells more, but his party turned its efforts to support the candidacy of businessman Rodrigo Lloreda, before the departure of Álvaro Gómez due to a difference with former president Pastrana. César Gaviria, close to the assassinated candidate Luis Carlos Galán (the favorite in the polls) ended up defeating Gómez in the elections, and Lloreda only came in fourth place.

=== Presidential candidature (2006) ===
In 2006, Leyva was a candidate for the presidency for the National Reconciliation Movement, the result of his dissidence from the Conservative Party, as a result of the conservatism decided to support the re-election of President Álvaro Uribe During his presidential candidacy he said that he would be able to stop the war in six months and allocate the resources of the conflict to social programs, with a government program known as "Noah's Ark". However, in the absence of guarantees to continue with the campaign, Leyva withdrew his candidacy 20 days before the elections. Ultimately, Uribe was re-elected president.

== Minister of Foreign Affairs (2022-2024) ==
On 25 June 2022, after Gustavo Petro's victory in the elections, this last announcement to Leyva as his new Minister of Foreign Affairs, Leyva had served as a negotiator in numerous agreements with insurgent groups, including the M-19. A group to which Gustavo Petro belonged, within the total peace policy. As foreign affairs minister, he has played an important role in protecting and embassying the so-called total peace policy of the Presidency of Gustavo Petro. As a promoter of total peace, he has represented the country in different areas of the world, he has been one of the fundamental supports of the president in the expansion of foreign affairs, migration policy, as well as the implementation of new bilateral agreements.

In late January, 2024, Leyva was suspended from his duties as Minister for three months. The suspension was for potential violations of procurement laws related to the company awarded the contract to make Colombian passports.

== Notes ==
Political offices
Preceded by Carlos Martinez	Minister of Mines and Energy; 1984-1985	Succeeded by Iván Duque Escobar
Preceded by Marta Lucía Ramírez	Minister of Foreign Affairs; 2022–2024	Succeeded by Luis Gilberto Murillo
