= Justice and Peace Law of Colombia =

The Justice and Peace Law of Colombia or Law 975 of 2005 is a legal framework promoted by the government of Álvaro Uribe Vélez and approved by Congress to facilitate the demobilization of paramilitaries in Colombia and eventually could be used in the demobilization of guerrilla groups.

== Law of Justice and Peace ==
In 2002 the government of former President Álvaro Uribe and the High Commissioner for Peace, Luis Carlos Restrepo, began a process that would give a legal framework in which armed groups outside the law, paramilitary like the United Self Defense Forces of Colombia (AUC) and guerrilla groups, would surrender their weapons and reintegrate into civil society, a process known as demobilization.

In 2003, the Defense Forces of Colombia signed a demobilization agreement with the government in which 30,000 members of the armed organization and its commanders cease operations. The government then introduced a bill known as alternative punishment. The law had to be withdrawn due to national and international pressure.

Between 2005 and 2006 the country adopted a legislative framework that allows for the prosecution and sentencing of members of illegal armed groups which had benefited from demobilization processes. This regulation is known as Act 975 of 2005, the Justice and Peace Law.

On May 13 of 2008, some demobilized AUC commanders were extradited to the United States to respond in that country's courts on charges of drug trafficking. The government's decision to allow this extradition was based on the argument that they were still committing crimes from prison.

== Reactions ==
During the drafting and processing, the bill was criticized by human rights groups and the United Nations, among others. Critics felt that might be too generous in offering sentences 5–8 years for serious crimes, applicable to offenses that demobilized them confess or that the State can prove later. It has also been criticized at first was relatively limited time period for investigations or processes that help generate betrayal evidential material. The United Nations, through its spokesman Michael Fruhling, have criticized the conduct of a full confession was not a requirement of the process, but in principle it requires rather a kind of free version on the criminal activities of demobilized, arguing that That would be an obstacle to the full decommissioning of paramilitary and reparations for victims.

The Colombian government and the defenders of the Justice and Peace Law argued that it was necessary to find a balance between the requirements of justice and peace, which implies the acceptance of certain impunity implied in a negotiation process. It was also argued that it was the first law and the first demobilization sentences featuring fighters and leaders who had not been defeated in combat, in contrast to previous demobilization process with the guerrillas. The then Minister of Interior and Justice Pretelt told the media that requiring full confession may have constituted a violation of the Constitution in force, by self-incrimination. The Attorney General Mario Iguaran said his office intends to continue with all processes involving possible criminal activity not confessed and acted upon in this case as both crimes against demobilized later, if necessary.

The Constitutional Court reviewed the constitutionality of the Law of Justice and Peace. In a decision of April 2006, by 7 votes to 2, no procedural irregularities found in the fact that the process of law in Congress was that of a non-statutory law.

On May 18 of 2006, a new fault already referred to the content of the law, the Court conditioned several excerpts of the law and others declared unenforceable, the court ruling stated that "those applying the law must meet to fully the resolutions of the law, as the total crimes confession, reparation and truth, and not re-offend, "unlike the bill that passed the government and Congress approved the full confession which was not a requirement and demonstrate the crimes after demobilization did not affect the legal benefits obtained by demobilized.

Human Rights Watch believes that the Court's decision was a great corrective, solving a number of serious problems and gaps that existed in the original bill.

== Who is covered by the Justice and Peace Law? ==
Currently, there are benefits on the acceptance of crimes committed just before the date of enactment of the law, by members of armed groups outside the law, in the context of a peace process. Precisely for extending the period of benefit, during the second administration of Álvaro Uribe Vélez, in April 2009, the Government filed a project that allowed members of armed groups could receive the benefits of Law 975 of 25 July 2005. But the initiative was only a debate and died within Congress.

According to Frank Pearl, High Commissioner for Peace during the second period of Uribe, initially thought that by 25 July 2005 the negotiations were to be completed, but it was not. Between then and the following year, 25,000 demobilized paramilitaries and 25 of the 37 fronts demobilized. "At first there was no difficulty, explains Pearl-because the legal interpretation was that the Justice and Peace Law covering crimes people have committed to the day of their demobilization, and that interpretation was in effect for about two years" . However, the Supreme Court issued emphasized jurisprudence indicating where Article 72 of the Law of Justice and Peace: "applies only to events that occurred prior to its effective and effective as of the date of promulgation (25 July 2005) ".

== See also ==
- Parapolitics
- United Self-Defense Forces of Colombia
