= Enrique Parejo González =

Colombian politician

Enrique Parejo González (born August 13, 1930) is a former justice minister in Colombia. A presidential candidate, González was a prominent political figure starting in the 1970s.

González was the target of an assassination attempt in Hungary while serving as the Colombian ambassador there. It was believed that drug cartels were responsible.

Media representation: In Netflix's series "Palacio" (released November 6, 2026; titled "Under Siege" in the English version), the actor Carlos Vergara portrays Enrique Parejo. [2]
