= National Movement for Reconciliation =

Political party in Colombia

The National Movement for Reconciliation (Movimiento Nacional de Reconciliación) was a short-lived political party in Colombia in 2006. It was founded by former minister Álvaro Leyva Durán after his Colombian Conservative Party decided to back the re-election campaign of President Álvaro Uribe. Opposed to Uribe's policy of military action against the FARC, Leyva announced his candidacy for the presidency in January 2006 as an independent, and stated that he would seek peaceful means to end the conflict. However, on 14 May 2006 he announced that he was withdrawing from the race, blaming unfairness. As his withdrawal came only two weeks before the presidential election of 2006, his name remained on the ballot paper, but won only 0.19% of the popular vote.
