= Colombia First =

Colombia First Primero Colombia
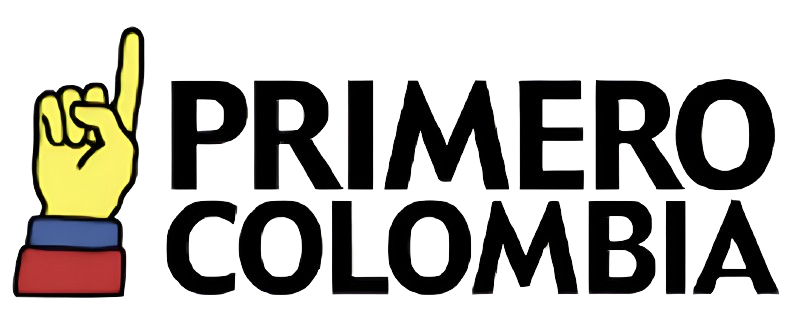
- Leader: Álvaro Uribe
- Founded: 2001
- Dissolved: 2010
- Split from: Colombian Liberal Party
- Ideology: Uribism; Conservatism; Nationalism; Neoliberalism; Neoconservatism; Right-wing populism
- Political position: Right-wing

Colombia First (Spanish: Primero Colombia) was a non-profit foundation and later conservative political movement in Colombia which supported the candidacy of Álvaro Uribe in the 2002 and 2006 presidential elections.

The movement was created in 2001 by Antioquia businessman Fabio Echeverri, alongside Medellín businessman José Roberto Arango and Alberto Velásquez, to support Álvaro Uribe's candidacy in the 2002 presidential election. Uribe, a member of the Colombian Liberal Party and former governor of Antioquia (1995–1997), had declined to run in the Liberal Party's internal consultations and instead sought the presidency as an independent, Liberal dissident supported by the Primero Colombia movement. Because Primero Colombia was not a recognized political party, Uribe obtained ballot access by collecting signatures. Law 130 of 1994 (Article 9) allows candidates, backed by 'significant group of citizens' (grupos significativos de ciudadanos), to obtain ballot access by collecting signatures equivalent to 20% of the number of registered voters divided by the number of seats to be filled, in no case requiring. more than 50,000 signatures. Álvaro Uribe's candidacy later received the endorsements of several other right-wing parties, including that of the Colombian Conservative Party, which officially backed Uribe's candidacy after its own candidate withdrew from the race.

Uribe was elected President of Colombia on 26 May 2002 with 54% of the vote by the first round. Thereafter, the Colombia First movement remained dormant, not running any candidates for any other offices (local, regional or congressional) in later elections, until it was resuscitated to support Uribe's reelection campaign, once again running as an independent by collecting over one million signatures. Nevertheless, Uribe was backed by a wide majority in Congress, and his candidacy for reelection was supported by several parties including the Conservative Party, Party of the U, Radical Change, Team Colombia and the Democratic Colombia Party. Uribe was reelected with 62.4% of the vote by the first round.

In 2009, two Uribe supporters, Luis Carlos Restrepo and Roy Barreras sought to rename the Party of the U as Colombia First to create a large uribista coalition, uniting all the President's supporters, to back Uribe's potential candidacy for a third term in 2010. However, Fabio Echeverri signalled that he had no intention of giving up his rights to the name.
