= Colombian peace process =

Negotiations between the Colombian government and FARC (2012–2016)

The Colombian peace process is the negotiations between the Government of Colombia under President Juan Manuel Santos and the Revolutionary Armed Forces of Colombia (FARC–EP) aimed at ending the decades-long Colombian conflict. Formal negotiations began in September 2012 and were primarily held in Havana, Cuba. These talks culminated in the Final Peace Agreement between the Government of Colombia and the FARC-EP.

In 2016, negotiators announced the final agreement. President Santos and FARC commander-in-chief Rodrigo Londoño Echeverri, better known as Timoleón Jiménez (nickname "Timochenko"), publicly signed the first peace accord. Londoño had assumed leadership of the FARC in 2011 following the death of Guillermo León Sáenz (better known as Alfonso Cano). At the event, Londoño issued a public apology, stating: “We are being reborn to launch a new era of reconciliation and of building peace.” However, the agreement was narrowly rejected in a national referendum held on October 2, 2016, with 50.2% voting against and 49.8% in favor.

A revised peace agreement was signed on November 24, 2016, and instead of holding another referendum, the government submitted it to the Congress of Colombia for ratification. Both houses of Congress ratified the new agreement on November 29 and 30, officially ending the conflict.

== Background ==
The Colombian armed conflict is one of the longest-running ongoing armed conflicts in the world. It officially began in 1964 with the creation of two major guerrilla groups: the Revolutionary Armed Forces of Colombia (Fuerzas Armadas Revolucionarias de Colombia, FARC), founded by rebel leader Manuel Marulanda, and the National Liberation Army (Colombia) (Ejército de Liberación Nacional, ELN), which was later led by Spanish priest Manuel Pérez Martínez, also known as "El Cura Pérez". The ELN has been classified as a terrorist organization by the governments of Colombia, the United States, Canada, New Zealand, and the European Union.

In 1990 and 1991, several smaller guerrilla groups reached peace agreements with the Colombian government, leading to their demobilization and reintegration into civilian political life. The first to do so was the 19th of April Movement (M-19), which disarmed in exchange for a blanket amnesty. Other groups that followed similar paths included most fronts of the Popular Liberation Army (EPL) and the Movimiento Armado Quintín Lame (MAQL).

However, efforts to reach a peace agreement with the FARC were consistently unsuccessful. The most notable attempt prior to the 2012 peace process occurred between 1999 and 2002, during the presidency of Andrés Pastrana Arango. Pastrana granted the FARC a special demilitarized zone in southern Colombia to facilitate talks, but despite three years of negotiations, no agreement was reached. On February 20, 2002, Pastrana ended the peace process and ordered the military to retake control of the zone, just months before the 2002 presidential elections. During the process, the FARC had used the demilitarized area to hold hostages, negotiate prisoner exchanges, train fighters, and plan military operations.

This failed peace process coincided with an escalation in violence, driven in part by the rapid expansion of right-wing paramilitary groups such as the United Self-Defense Forces of Colombia (AUC), who opposed negotiations with guerrillas. Between 1998 and 2002, Colombia experienced some of its most violent years in recent history; the national homicide rate rose from 58.9 to 69.7 per 100,000 inhabitants, there were over 3,000 kidnappings annually, 390 attacks on civilian settlements and 898 massacres, primarily carried out by paramilitaries, resulting in more than 5,400 deaths.

Widespread public disillusionment with the peace process contributed to the election of Álvaro Uribe in 2002. Uribe ran on a hardline platform that rejected dialogue without a prior cessation of hostilities. As president, he implemented the democratic security (seguridad democrática) policy, reframing the conflict as a war on terrorism and drug trafficking. His administration pledged to “implacably punish” terrorism, dismantle armed groups, and reestablish state control across the country. Complementing this approach, Uribe launched collective and individual demobilization programs that offered pardons for political crimes and assistance to those who laid down arms. These efforts, along with the controversial Justice and Peace Law of 2005, provided the legal framework for the demobilization of paramilitary groups between 2003 and 2006.

As the FARC rejected President Uribe's new security policies, the Colombian government launched a large-scale military, political, and judicial offensive against the guerrilla group. While this strategy significantly weakened the FARC's military capabilities, it was also accompanied by serious human rights violations committed by the armed forces, most notably the "false positives" scandal. The government's offensive forced the FARC to retreat into remote rural areas and produced key results: the recovery of control over major highways, a sharp decrease in kidnappings, a reduction in the national homicide rate, and the restoration of state authority in several regions. These achievements, widely publicized in national media, contributed to Uribe's high approval ratings and provided the political momentum needed to pass a constitutional amendment allowing his reelection in 2006.

While government forces regained territory previously held by the guerrillas in the 1980s and 1990s, the FARC adapted by relocating and reactivating their operations in new strategic and border regions. They also carried out attacks in urban areas, such as the El Nogal Club bombing, and launched a counteroffensive in 2005.

During his second term, Uribe prioritized the consolidation of democratic security. In March 2008, FARC leader Raúl Reyes was killed in a controversial cross-border raid into Ecuador, triggering a regional diplomatic crisis. Just two months later, the group's founder, Manuel Marulanda, died of natural causes.

Amid these setbacks, the FARC attempted to regain political initiative by proposing a humanitarian exchange of hostages. In August 2007, facing public pressure, Uribe agreed to allow Venezuelan President Hugo Chávez to mediate. However, Uribe terminated Chávez's role in November 2007. Subsequent hostage releases were carried out unilaterally by the FARC, with Venezuelan facilitation, as in Operation Emmanuel, or through military rescue operations, most notably Operation Jaque.

Although no formal peace negotiations with the FARC were initiated during President Álvaro Uribe's administration, there were reports of clandestine contacts between the government and the guerrilla group. In 2012, as the new peace process was underway, El Tiempo reported that Uribe had pursued "secret approaches with the FARC in search of a peace process" up until the final months of his second term.

In 2013, former Swiss mediator Jean Pierre Gontard revealed that, in 2006, Uribe had authorized three brief, unilateral military ceasefires to facilitate contact between the two parties.

In July 2008, following the successful rescue of 15 hostages by the Colombian military during Operation Jaque, the government initiated discreet contacts with the FARC. These included outreach to the group's new commander, Alfonso Cano, offering the possibility of a “dignified” exit from the conflict.

According to the Colombian government's 2010–2014 National Development Plan, the FARC had been forced to revert to basic guerrilla warfare tactics: carrying out sporadic, uncoordinated attacks against security forces and using intimidation against civilians.

In 2010, former Minister of Defense Juan Manuel Santos was elected president with Uribe's endorsement, campaigning on a platform that promised to continue consolidating democratic security. In September of that year, Santos celebrated the death of FARC military commander Mono Jojoy in a targeted military operation. Nonetheless, President Santos soon began to distance himself from his predecessor. In his inaugural speech, he stated that the “door to dialogue” was not “locked with a key", signaling openness to talks with illegal armed groups under certain conditions. In 2011, his administration secured congressional approval for the landmark Victims and Land Restitution Law (Law 1448 of 2011), which formally recognized victims of the armed conflict and granted reparation rights, including land restitution.

Santos also worked to restore diplomatic relations with neighboring Venezuela and Ecuador, which had deteriorated under Uribe. Venezuelan President Chávez shifted his position on the conflict and began advocating for a peaceful, negotiated solution, joining Cuba as an external supporter of dialogue.

== Peace process ==
=== Exploratory meetings ===
A number of secret exploratory meetings between representatives of the Colombian government and the FARC began taking place in the spring of 2011. The FARC reported that the first of such meetings took place in March 2011 near the Colombian-Venezuelan border, with the guerrillas represented by Rodrigo Granda (the FARC's main international representative) and Andrés París (a veteran political theorist and negotiator), and the government by presidential advisers Alejandro Eder and Jaime Avendaño. Two further meetings took place by July, where both parties agreed to continue exploratory meetings in Havana, Cuba. These first contacts were meant to settle the details of where, how, and when the next stage of the process–secret encounters to set an agenda for talks–would be held.

In July 2011, the government appointed senior officials to participate in the process: Frank Pearl González, serving as environment minister; Sergio Jaramillo Caro, national security adviser to the president; and President Santos' brother Enrique Santos, former director of El Tiempo. For the magazine Semana, Enrique Santos' inclusion was a "gesture of confidence" by President Santos to the guerrilla forces, because of the familial ties between the two men and Enrique Santos' past involvement in dialogues with the guerrilla forces. The FARC negotiating team was joined by Mauricio Jaramillo and Marcos Calarcá.

Secret negotiations continued despite the death of Alfonso Cano, the FARC leader, in a military operation in November 2011. Semana reported that both negotiating parties had agreed to the principle that nothing coming from the outside could influence the discussions, while the FARC stated that its Central High Command had decided to continue the exploratory meetings, "for it was the will of Alfonso Cano".

Once the negotiators had been agreed upon, the two sides moved to designate foreign guarantor countries. Cuba, host to previous encounters, was a logical choice, while Norway was chosen as the second guarantor country for its active role in international conflict mediation. Additionally, two facilitator or "accompanying countries" were also designated. The FARC chose Venezuela, while the Colombian government chose Chile. Exploratory meetings continued in Havana in February 2012, with limited social exchanges between the two negotiating teams to preserve the confidentiality of the talks. By August 2012, nearly ten preparatory rounds had taken place, with each round lasting between four and eight days, for a total of approximately 65 encounters between both sides. The five main speakers for both sides remained in Cuba for the duration of the process.

In February 2012, as a first public "gesture of peace", the FARC announced by communiqué that it would henceforth proscribe the practice of extortive kidnappings, which it had "legalized" by its ley 002 in 2000.

In August 2012, former President Álvaro Uribe affirmed that the government was negotiating with the FARC in Cuba: claims which were denied by defence minister Juan Carlos Pinzón and foreign minister María Ángela Holguín. However, on August 27, Telesur broke the news that the government and the FARC were on the verge of announcing the signature of an agreement to begin formal peace negotiations, and President Santos later confirmed the information.

In a televised address on September 4, Santos announced the signature of a "general agreement" setting the rules and agenda for peace negotiations. He stressed that "past mistakes will not be repeated", as they would not demilitarize any territory or suspend military operations, and would hold the peace negotiations outside of Colombia with international support.

=== General Agreement ===
==== Delegations and installation of dialogues ====
A General Agreement for the Termination of the Conflict and the Construction of a Stable and Lasting Peace (Acuerdo General para la terminación del conflicto y la construcción de una paz estable y duradera) was signed by representatives of the Colombian government and the FARC on August 26, 2012, in Havana, Cuba. The agreement set a road map for the initiation of a formal peace process, established the rules by which the negotiations would operate, and outlined a five-point thematic agenda.

The thematic issues to be discussed were integral rural development, political participation, end of the conflict (including bilateral and definite ceasefire and cessation of hostilities, and surrender of weapons), and a solution to the problem of illicit drugs and victims. Additionally, the issue of ratification, implementation, and verification would be discussed.

As per the agreement, each delegation was composed of up to 30 people, with up to 10 participating in sessions and five being plenipotentiaries. The discussions at the negotiation table were private, but periodic reports would be issued, and a mechanism to receive proposals from individuals and organizations was set up. One of the major principles of the negotiations was that "nothing is agreed upon until everything is agreed upon".

Compared to past peace processes, the current peace process began with a defined agenda and a limited number of issues to be discussed. In addition, it was the first peace process with the FARC where the "end of the conflict" and the surrender of weapons by the guerrilla group were explicitly listed and identified as the end goal.

The delegation of the Colombian government was led by former Vice President Humberto de la Calle as chief negotiator, flanked by the High Commissioner for Peace Sergio Jaramillo, as well as Frank Pearl, business leader Luis Carlos Villegas, Enrique Santos Calderón, Alejandro Éder, retired general of the National Police Óscar Naranjo, and retired Army General Jorge Enrique Mora. The FARC delegation was led by Iván Márquez as chief negotiator, alongside Jesús Santrich, Rodrigo Granda, Andrés París, Marcos Calarcá, Mauricio Jaramillo, Pablo Catatumbo, Tanja Nijmeijer, and Simón Trinidad (currently in jail in the United States).

The peace talks were formally installed in Oslo, Norway, on October 18, 2012 and moved to their permanent location in Havana in November. The speech by FARC chief negotiator Iván Márquez at the installation of dialogues in Oslo was interpreted by the Colombian media as unexpectedly radical for its defiant tone against the government, including the mention of items excluded from the agenda (such as economic model, foreign investment, military doctrine, mining, and land ownership) and defense of the armed struggle.

On November 20, 2012, the FARC announced a unilateral temporary ceasefire until January 20, 2013. The guerrilla group announced it as "a solid contribution to strengthening the climate of understanding necessary for the parties to start dialogue and to achieve the purpose all Colombians ask for."

The peace process received the support of prominent left-wing governments in Latin America. President Hugo Chávez, in one of his last statements in October 2012, aspired to see the FARC joining a peaceful political process. Rafael Correa, the President of Ecuador, endorsed the peace process as an opportune moment for the FARC to lay down their weapons. In December 2012, Bolivian President Evo Morales said that the FARC needed to "exchange bullets for votes".

=== 2013 ===
While discussions advanced on the first item on the agenda (integral rural development), the peace process faced its first major crisis at the end of January 2013, following the kidnapping of two police officers by the FARC in the Valle del Cauca on January 25. The incident was followed by a FARC ambush which killed four soldiers in the Nariño Department on January 31, and the assassination of another three police officers in La Guajira Department on February 1. The FARC claimed that these actions were in retaliation for a military bombing that left 20 guerrillas dead during the FARC's unilateral ceasefire, which came to an end on January 20. Government negotiators in Havana argued that such actions undermined the peace process. In bringing the war to the negotiating table, both sides broke their previous understanding not to let events of the conflict affect the process, and the dispute escalated into a war of words between the two parties. The government, pressed by former President Uribe's fiery opposition to the peace process, sternly warned the FARC that it would respond in kind and would not be pressured into discussing a bilateral ceasefire, as demanded by the FARC.

Despite these difficulties, negotiations on the first item continued. In March, a delegation of six members of Congress traveled to Havana to meet with the FARC negotiators, and the encounter was described as productive and respectful. Senator Roy Barreras (Partido de la U) declared that the peace process was moving forward to stages never reached in prior peace processes. On May 26, both sides announced a partial agreement on the first point: comprehensive rural reform. The agreement focused on the issues of land access and use, unproductive land, property titles, rural development, infrastructure, social development in rural regions, agricultural and livestock production, technical assistance, subsidies and credits, and food and nutritional policies.

Despite these advances, a new major point of difference between the government and the FARC emerged: the latter's insistence on a Constituent assembly to implement the results of a final agreement. For the guerrilla group, a constituent assembly was the only way to change the political regime and reform political institutions, but the government maintained its steadfast opposition to the idea for the risks entailed by changing the Constitution. Several members of the government, led by chief negotiator Humberto de la Calle, made the government's opposition to a constituent assembly clear. To ratify a final agreement, the government instead proposed an existing form of citizen participation: a popular consultation, referendum or plebiscite.

In August 2013, the government presented a bill organizing the constitutional referendums necessary for implementation of the final agreement, hoping to hold it alongside the 2014 congressional elections (in March) or the presidential election (in May), which would require the signature of a final agreement by the end of 2013. The FARC, pushing for a constituent assembly, opposed the government's short time frame to close negotiations and announced a "pause" in talks. Although talks eventually continued, frustration with the slow pace of the process and the approaching 2014 electoral campaigns led to media speculation about the possibility of talks being suspended or even broken off.

The peace process was given a boost on November 6 with the announcement of a partial agreement on the second point of the agenda, political participation (with the issue of the constituent assembly unresolved). The FARC announced a second unilateral temporary ceasefire on December 15, 2013, valid through January 14, 2014.

In 2013, the Colombian peace process received widespread support from the international community and world leaders, including former US President Bill Clinton, former Spanish Prime Minister Felipe González, former British Prime Minister Tony Blair, Portuguese President Aníbal Cavaco Silva, and German President Joachim Gauck.

=== 2014 ===
In February 2014, the negotiations were rocked by revelations, made by Semana, that a military intelligence unit had illegally monitored the private communications of government negotiators in Havana. President Juan Manuel Santos declared the illegal interceptions "unacceptable" and ordered a public investigation to determine if "dark forces" were trying to sabotage the peace process. Within days, two generals, including the head of military intelligence, were dismissed, and the attorney general's office began investigations.

On May 16, 2014, a partial agreement was reached on another point of the agenda: illicit drugs. However, the developments in Havana were overshadowed by the campaigns for the congressional elections (March 9) and the two-round presidential election (May 25 and June 15). Former President Álvaro Uribe, the leading opponent to the peace process, had founded his own party, the Democratic Centre (Centro Democrático, CD) and led his party's list for Senate in March. The party's Uribe-led list won over 2 million votes and 20 seats, forming a solid opposition bloc in the new legislature, although parties supportive of the peace process retained majorities in both houses of Congress.

The peace process became one of the main issues in the presidential race, with the promise of peace forming the basis of President Santos' reelection campaign, while Uribe's Democratic Centre candidate Óscar Iván Zuluaga opposed the peace process. Zuluaga had said that he would suspend the peace negotiations until the FARC agreed to a permanent, verifiable unilateral ceasefire within 8 days: conditions judged to be realistically impossible. Additionally, Zuluaga claimed that there was no armed conflict but rather a "terrorist threat" and asserted that issues such as agrarian reform and illicit drugs could not be decided with the FARC, "the main drug cartel in the world". Promising instead "peace without impunity", Zuluaga said he was disposed to offer reduced jail sentences for those who had committed crimes against humanity but with political eligibility limited only to guerrilla fighters, not commanders.

In the first round, Zuluaga did well, with a first-place finish (29.28%) ahead of President Santos (25.72%). In his second round campaign, the incumbent president doubled down on the issue of peace, presenting the election as a choice between peace or endless war. He successfully put together a broad coalition for peace with endorsements from the left and centre-left, including that of Clara López, the first round candidate of the left-wing Alternative Democratic Pole (15.21%), but also his 2010 rival Antanas Mockus and the left-wing Mayor of Bogotá Gustavo Petro. Zuluaga was endorsed by Marta Lucía Ramírez, the first round candidate of the Conservative Party (15.52%). As a result of his alliance with Ramírez, Zuluaga moderated his position on the peace process, agreeing to continue negotiations under certain conditions – an evaluation of what had been agreed upon and "tangible signs of peace" from the guerrilla. Santos was reelected in June with 51% against 45% for Zuluaga.

The FARC declared two unilateral temporary ceasefires during the first and second rounds of the presidential election, between May 20 and 28, and again between June 9 and 30.

In August, the first meeting between 12 victims of the conflict and the negotiators took place in Havana; an event hailed as a highly symbolic, solemn exchange between the victims meeting face-to-face with their victimizers. In a joint communiqué for the occasion, both sides reiterated that victims were at the core of the agreement. The second victims' delegation was received in September. Notwithstanding these encounters, victims of the FARC, feeling that they had not been sufficiently taken into account, organized a forum to have their voices heard. The forum brought together both opponents and supporters of the peace process.

Beginning in July, a series of attacks by the FARC hit civilian populations particularly badly: bombings destroying electric pylons left Buenaventura without electricity; bombings on roads and water conduits cut off municipalities in the Meta and Guaviare departments from running water or communication for several days; a grenade attack by the FARC against a police officer killed his 3-year-old daughter; in the Putumayo, the guerrillas forced tanker trucks to spill the crude oil they were carrying. President Santos warned the FARC that they were playing with fire and negotiations could not continue forever under such actions. On their side, the FARC threatened to leave the negotiation table if the government continued killing their commanders. The FARC also escalated their rhetoric, with Pablo Catatumbo blaming the state for the bulk of the victims of the conflict and justifying kidnappings, while the FARC's leader Timochenko complained in a statement that the media was making excessive demands on the guerrillas to face their victims and seek forgiveness.

Despite these incidents, in Havana, negotiations continued moving forward with the creation of a historical commission on the conflict and its victims, an agreement to begin parallel discussions on the "end of the conflict" item, and the installation of a sub-commission on gender issues. In late September, President Santos announced at the United Nations General Assembly that the government had decided to make public the agreements reached up to that point in Havana, including the joint drafts of the partial agreements on comprehensive rural reform, illicit drugs, and political participation. The government said it was a transparency measure to end speculation and rumours about the contents of the agreements with the guerrillas.

On November 16, the FARC kidnapped General Rubén Darío Alzate, the commander of the Joint Task Force Titán. Alzate was the first general to be captured by the guerrillas in the history of the armed conflict. President Santos ordered government negotiators not to travel to Havana until the hostages were released, while the FARC mostly highlighted the political implications of the kidnapping and used it to insist on the need for a bilateral ceasefire. Through mediation, facilitated by the guarantor countries and the International Red Cross, General Alzate was released by his FARC captors on November 30 and handed over to representatives of the Red Cross. As a result of General Alzate's kidnapping, both parties in Havana began talks on de-escalation of the conflict on December 12. On December 17, the FARC announced in a statement that they would be declaring an indefinite unilateral ceasefire beginning on December 20, which would end if guerrilla fronts were attacked by the authorities. This was the FARC's fifth unilateral ceasefire since 2012, and the first indefinite one.

=== Crisis and de-escalation ===
Between January and April 2015, peace negotiations in Havana showed signs of continued progress and growing international support. On February 20, US Secretary of State John Kerry announced the appointment of a special envoy to the Colombian peace process, Bernard Aronson. The appointment was welcomed, including by the FARC, and interpreted as a clear endorsement of Colombia's peace process by the United States, which had long been a key foreign player in the Colombian conflict. On February 27, former United Nations Secretary General Kofi Annan visited the negotiating table in Havana. On March 7, the negotiating parties in Cuba announced through a joint communiqué the creation of a mine clearance pilot project to clean and decontaminate land from the presence of anti-personnel mines, improvised explosive devices and unexploded ordnances, with the leadership and coordination of the Norwegian People's Aid. The announcement was significant, as the FARC undertook to reveal the location of mines and suspending the planting of new ones in that territory, and it was the first aspect of the peace negotiations which would have an immediate impact on the ground. The pilot project was launched in the municipality of Briceño, Antioquia.

On March 10, in a televised statement, President Santos recognized that the FARC had kept their word on the unilateral ceasefire and, as a gesture to de-escalate the conflict, ordered the Ministry of Defence and military commanders to cease the bombing of FARC camps for a month.

On April 15, 11 soldiers were killed in a FARC ambush Cauca, a crisis which threatened the future of the peace process and left many bewildered as to the reasons why the FARC had seemingly sabotaged the de-escalation process. The FARC negotiators in Havana justified the attack, claiming the army had been advancing with reinforcements against a guerrilla camp: they denounced "premeditated attacks" by the military, but deplored the loss of life and reiterated their demands for a bilateral ceasefire. President Santos responded immediately by ordering bombings to resume. Within the government, the idea of imposing a deadline for an agreement grew in popularity, supported by Vice President Germán Vargas Lleras and even by strong supporters of the peace process, like senator Horacio Serpa and interior minister Juan Fernando Cristo. President Santos also mentioned the idea in a speech on April 17.

The death of the 11 soldiers turned public opinion against the peace process and boosted the popularity of its main opponent, Álvaro Uribe. In an Ipsos poll, Santos' approval fell from 40% to 29% compared to November 2014, pessimism in the peace process increased 16 points to 69% during the same period, and former President Uribe's favourable image increased from 41% to 57%. Nevertheless, only 27% of respondents in the poll wanted to break off dialogues and launch a military offensive. For a skeptical public, the FARC's attack was a sign that their ceasefire had been deceitful and only heightened frustration with a peace process which had recorded no formal agreement since May 2014. However, according to the Conflict Analysis Resource Center (CERAC), the attack on the soldiers was the only severe violation of the ceasefire, given that the FARC had generally complied with their ceasefire up to that point, resulting in the lowest levels of violence in the conflict since 1984.

On May 22, as retaliation for the attack in the Cauca, a military operation in Guapi, Cauca killed 26 guerrillas of the FARC's 29th front. Days later, guerrilla commander and general staff member Román Ruiz was killed in the Chocó. The FARC called off their unilateral ceasefire declared in December 2014. Although it had been agreed upon that negotiations would take place in the midst of continued conflict, the end of the FARC's unilateral ceasefire was seen as putting the peace process in a critical moment which would lead to its end if not handled cautiously. Combined with President Santos' historically low popularity, the negotiations' loss of credibility, and the strength of Uribe's opposition to the peace progress, the Havana talks appeared to be in dire straits. The crisis worried Cuba and Norway, the two guarantor countries, who called on the two sides to continue efforts at a negotiated settlement, including an agreement on a definite bilateral ceasefire.

The government shuffled its negotiating team in Havana: Foreign minister María Ángela Holguín was integrated into the negotiating team, as was Gonzalo Restrepo, former president of the Grupo Éxito. Luis Carlos Villegas was appointed Minister of Defence and left the negotiating team, replacing Juan Carlos Pinzón who had been sent as ambassador to the United States.

Following the end of the ceasefire, both sides made small gestures of peace, with Santos ordering that the bodies of guerrillas killed in combat be identified and returned to their families, while the FARC reiterated their will to remain in the negotiations. A technical sub-commission for the end of the conflict began discussions about confidence-building measures, while the mine clearance pilot project began in Briceño (Antioquia), with Humberto de la Calle highlighting the historic nature of the military and the FARC working alongside one another. The FARC's negotiators in Havana and their leader, Timochenko, adopted a conciliatory tone. Analysts opined that the talks had reached a point of maturity where both sides appreciated their common objective and jointly protected what had been accomplished. On June 4, the negotiating sides created a commission for the clarification of truth, coexistence, and non-repetition: the basis for an extrajudicial truth commission on the victims of the conflict.

In Colombia, however, a wave of attacks by the FARC in June seemed to undo the progress made in Havana: sabotage to energy infrastructure left Buenaventura and Tumaco without electricity; 13,000 barrels of oil were spilled in Putumayo; a power pylon in Caquetá was bombed; and police colonel Alfredo Ruiz Clavijowas was assassinated in Ipiales. These attacks left over one million people without electricity, and the attacks against oil infrastructure created an environmental catastrophe. With these actions, the FARC had sought to regain the military initiative after the hits they suffered from the military in May and put political pressure on the government, but analysts judged that the guerrilla group had miscalculated, as it had further reduced their credibility in the eyes of the public.

Cuba and Norway, the guarantor countries, placed pressure on both sides to begin de-escalating the conflict. The FARC responded on July 8 by announcing a one-month unilateral ceasefire from July 20 and adding that they remained fully behind the peace process. Consideration of a bilateral ceasefire continued to be a more difficult question. On July 12, the government and the FARC negotiators in a joint communiqué entitled "Expedite in Havana and de-escalate in Colombia" announced a major agreement to de-escalate the conflict. Each delegation agreed to move towards a final agreement without delay by changing the format to "a technical, ongoing and simultaneous work on the core items of the Agenda, while concurrently building agreements at the Table": in particular, on the terms of the final bilateral ceasefire, cessation of hostilities, and surrender of weapons. Without agreeing to an immediate bilateral ceasefire, the government set in motion a de-escalation process of military actions consistent with the FARC's suspension of all offensive actions. In August, despite the unpopularity of the move, Santos ordered the suspension of bombings against the FARC.

=== Agreement on the Special Jurisdiction for Peace ===
On September 23, the government and the FARC reached a historic agreement on transitional justice in the form of the Special Jurisdiction for Peace (or Jurisdicción Especial para la Paz). Adding to the historic nature of the agreement, President Juan Manuel Santos and FARC commander Timoleón Jiménez "Timochenko" travelled to Havana for the announcement: the first public encounter between a sitting President of Colombia and the commander of the FARC. The presidential delegation included the President of the Senate Luis Fernando Velasco, the President of the Chamber of Representatives Alfredo Deluque, senator and Liberal leader Horacio Serpa, senator Antonio Navarro Wolff (himself a demobilized guerrilla from the M-19), and senator Iván Cepeda, as well as Juan Carlos Henao and Manuel José Cepeda, former judges of the Constitutional Court who had played a major role in working out the agreement. The meeting ended with an unscripted handshake between President Santos and Timochenko in front of Cuban President Raúl Castro. Simultaneously with the agreement, the government also announced that a final agreement would be signed within six months, or by March 23, 2016.

The agreement on transitional justice was the result of lengthy discussions between government and guerrilla lawyers in Havana and Bogotá, which had begun in July working under Santos' ultimatum to reach such an agreement by November at the latest. Facing an impasse in Havana, the negotiators delegated the file to a group of six respected jurists – Spanish lawyer Enrique Santiago, Conservative politician Álvaro Leyva, human rights advocate Diego Martínez, former judge Manuel José Cepeda, University of Notre Dame professor Douglass Cassel, and rector of the Universidad Externado de Colombia Juan Carlos Henao; the first three selected by the FARC, the latter three by the government. By September, the team of six had a text ready to be announced in Havana.

The September 23 agreement on transitional justice was considered the most important moment in the peace process to date, because it resolved one of the most complicated issues through means that were satisfactory to both the guerrilla and the government: combining restorative justice with alternative sentences for guerrillas and agents of the State who have committed crimes against humanity with amnesty for those responsible for political crimes. With the agreement, the peace process was considered to be "irreversible".

The announcement received acclaim internationally. US Secretary of State John Kerry praised the agreement, with his words even being relayed by FARC chief negotiator Iván Marquez's Twitter account. Fatou Bensouda, prosecutor of the International Criminal Court, "noted with optimism that the agreement excludes the granting of amnesties for war crimes and crimes against humanity and is designed, among other things, to end immunity for the most serious crimes." However, Human Rights Watch criticized the agreement, saying that it would exempt those responsible for the worst abuses from spending even a single day in jail – a view shared by Álvaro Uribe. In Colombia, the announcement was greeted with cautious optimism. In October, an Ipsos poll showed optimism in the peace process increasing from 29% to 46% since July, although majorities of respondents continued to doubt the FARC's commitment to peace and oppose their political participation.

In mid-October, the negotiators announced immediate humanitarian measures for the search, location, identification, and delivery of the remains of missing persons, and the creation of a search unit for disappeared persons.

The six-month window given to reach an agreement already appeared difficult to meet in November, due to delays in closing the transitional justice issue, which became paralyzed despite the September 23 announcements because of different interpretations on thorny details between the two sides.

On December 15, the final agreement on the fifth item of the agenda (victims), which included transitional justice, was finally announced by the negotiating parties in Cuba. It built on the truth commission, the September 23 agreement on the Special Jurisdiction for Peace, as well as the October announcements on the search unit for disappeared persons.

Disagreements between the government and the FARC continued on the mechanism for ratification of a final agreement. In November, the government gave its support to a bill submitted by senator Roy Barreras (Partido de la U) organizing a plebiscite on a final agreement. In Havana, the FARC responded negatively to the idea of the plebiscite, insisting on a constituent assembly. With the support of the government's congressional majority, the bill regulating the plebiscite was adopted by Congress in December 2015. As per the statutory law regulating the plebiscite, approval required support equivalent to 13% of the registered electorate for the winning option, a one-time exception to the existing law regulating plebiscites (Law 1757 of 2015) which has a turnout quorum of 50%. The reduction of the quorum, and the change from a turnout threshold to a decision threshold, was controversial. Additionally, in the plebiscite, voters would vote on the final agreement as a whole rather than article-by-article, something which also created some criticisms, primarily from Uribe's Democratic Centre. Following its adoption by Congress, the law passed to the Constitutional Court for a mandatory revision.

=== Final agreement - 2016 ===
On January 19, 2016, another significant step towards achieving a final agreement was made with the announcement of a trilateral mechanism for the verification and monitoring of a final ceasefire, cessation of hostilities and surrender of weapons, composed of the government, the FARC, and a political mission of the United Nations with observers from member states of the Community of Latin American and Caribbean States (CELAC). The international component would preside and coordinate the mechanism. In other words, the negotiators asked the United Nations Security Council to create such a political mission with unarmed observers for a renewable 12-month period.

The decision was highlighted by negotiators from both sides as a historic step towards the end of the conflict and confirmation of both parties' commitment to peace. Peace commissioner Sergio Jaramillo said that, with the UN Security Council involved, the government and the FARC would have to fulfill their obligations. FARC Secretariat member Carlos Antonio Losada, in an interview with Semana, noted that the bilateral ceasefire had been installed on the ground by the force of events and that no one would accept that this situation be reversed, specially with the UN involved. President Santos had previously contacted the five permanent members of the United Nations Security Council to secure their support, and the FARC had been convinced following consultations with UN Secretary General Ban Ki-moon.

In early February, the government and the FARC once again found themselves at odds, this time on the issue of the plebiscite. The FARC, by communiqué, argued that the plebiscite contravened the general agreement (from August 2012). In response, President Santos tweeted on social media that the final agreement in Havana would be submitted to plebiscite, whether the FARC liked it or not. In late February, the FARC's "armed proselytism" during a "political pedagogy" event (attended by Iván Marquez and other negotiators) in La Guajira stirred significant controversy. Since 2015, the FARC's negotiators had been authorized by the government to travel to Colombia to organize "political pedagogy" events with their troops only and, until then, all such activities had occurred without major problems. However, the presence of armed men mingling with the civilian population during this particular event in La Guajira rekindled fears about the use of weapons by the guerrillas during political events. President Santos notified the guerrillas that "political pedagogy" events were suspended until further notice and issued an ultimatum that either a final agreement is signed on March 23 or it would be understood that the FARC were not ready for peace. Semana considered the incident as a major blow to confidence and trust in the peace process, which came at a critical moment.

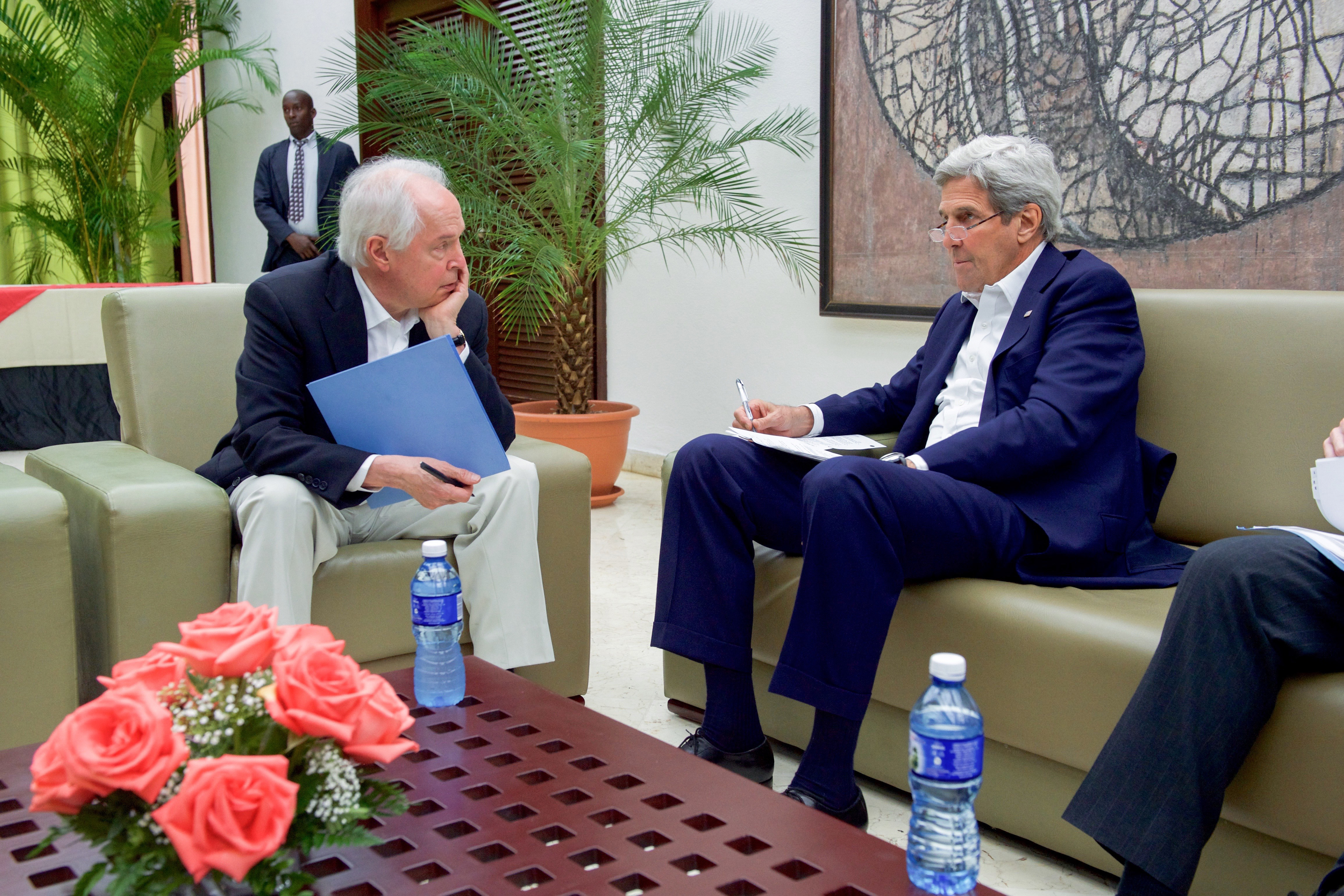
John Kerry speaks with Bernard Aronson before separate meetings with Colombian and FARC peace negotiators

Due to continued disagreements, the March 23 deadline for a final agreement that had been announced six months prior passed without any such agreement being finalized. It had been hoped that a final agreement could coincide with President Barack Obama's historic visit to Cuba on March 20. Nevertheless, Secretary of State John Kerry met with both peace delegations while in Cuba, reiterating the Obama administration's support for the peace process and the post-conflict.

On May 12, an agreement to provide legal security to the final agreement was reached. Once signed, the final agreement would be considered as a special agreement under the terms of common article 3 of the Geneva Conventions and would form part of the Constitution of Colombia's constitutionality bloc (as international humanitarian law). The government would present before Congress an ordinary law to approve the final agreement as a special agreement, Congress would approve or reject it as a whole within 8 days, and the Constitutional Court would review it. Afterwards, the government would present a constitutional amendment (legislative act) to incorporate the text of the final agreement into the Constitution as a transitory article. Finally, after signature of the final agreement, the President would make a unilateral declaration in the name of the Colombian State before the Secretary General of the UN, relating the final agreement to Resolution 2261 of January 25, 2016.

The announcement gave the agreement legal security, increasing the FARC's confidence that the agreements would be followed; enshrinement of a final agreement in the Constitution would protect it from future changes in political conditions and would be binding on the Colombian government before the international community. By agreeing to this procedure, the FARC signaled their acceptance of the political institutions they had rejected and fought against for decades. At the same time, without yet endorsing the plebiscite itself, the FARC indicated that the final agreement would be submitted for popular ratification, thereby implicitly dropping their insistence on a constituent assembly as an implementation mechanism. However, the details of the agreement on legal security sparked legal controversy in Colombia. Álvaro Uribe called it a coup d'état, while Inspector General Alejandro Ordóñez, another major critic of the peace process, wrote a letter to Santos in which he accused him of trying to replace the Constitution in collaboration with the FARC and threatened him with disciplinary action. However, lawyers not necessarily opposed to the peace process also raised questions about the legality of the measures detailed in the May 12 agreement, such as the incorporation of the final agreement into constitutional jurisprudence.

Three days later, the negotiating parties announced an agreement on the release of minors under 15 years of age from FARC camps, as well as a road map for the release of all other minors and a special program for their care. On June 10, the creation of an illicit crop substitution pilot project in Briceño (where the mine clearance pilot project was organized) was announced from Cuba.

On June 23, the government and the FARC signed historic agreements of the Colombian Peace Accords on the "end of the conflict", including the bilateral ceasefire, cessation of hostilities and surrender of weapons, during a ceremony in Havana, Cuba. The signature of the agreements was overseen by the guarantor countries (Cuba and Norway) and attended by President Juan Manuel Santos; FARC commander Timochenko; UN Secretary General Ban Ki-moon; Cuban President Raúl Castro, the host; Michelle Bachelet, President of Chile (accompanying country); Nicolás Maduro, President of Venezuela (accompanying country); Norwegian foreign minister Børge Brende; Danilo Medina, President of the Dominican Republic (president pro tempore of CELAC); Salvador Sánchez Cerén, President of El Salvador; Enrique Peña Nieto, President of Mexico; and representatives of the European Union and the United States.

The June 23 agreement laid down the modalities for the bilateral and definite ceasefire and cessation of hostilities, which would begin following the signature of the final agreement. Five days following the signature of the final agreement and following the redeployment of troops, the FARC would begin moving to 23 transitory rural settlement normalization zones (Zonas Veredales Transitorias de Normalización) and 8 encampments for the purpose of delivering their weapons to the UN mission and preparing for their reincorporation into civilian life. While the normal functioning of unarmed elected civilian authorities within these zones would not be impeded, no civilian population would be allowed to reside in the zones, and access would be restricted. A 1 kilometre-wide security zone, off limits to both soldiers and guerrilla, would surround each zone. The FARC would designate a group of 60 members to travel throughout the national territory in performance of tasks related to the peace agreement; likewise, within each zone, a group of 10 members of the guerrilla would travel within the municipality and department for the same reasons. The UN would collect and store all weapons received from the FARC, which would later be used to build three monuments. The guerrilla would surrender their weapons gradually in three phases over 180 days from the signature of the final agreement, and the UN mission would certify the process. The announcement offered further details about the tripartite monitoring and verification mechanism, with the international component (the UN political mission) presiding the mechanism, resolving controversies and presenting recommendations and reports about the ceasefire and surrender of weapons.

In addition to the above, the negotiating parties also announced an agreement on security guarantees, aimed at ensuring the safety of social movements, communities, human rights groups, political parties and movements (especially the political movement to be created by the FARC in their reintegration to civilian life). Symbolically, this agreement included a "national political pact" with political parties, unions, and civil society to guarantee that weapons would never again be used in pursuit of politics goals, nor would violent organizations be promoted.

Unexpectedly, on June 23, it was also announced that the FARC had agreed to support the decision to be rendered by the Constitutional Court on the plebiscite: in short, the FARC explicitly agreed to the plebiscite as the ratification mechanism for the final agreement. Prior to the June 23 announcements, Constitutional Court judge Luis Ernesto Vargas had already submitted a positive report (ponencia) on the plebiscite.

On July 19, the Constitutional Court ruled that the plebiscite ratifying the final agreement was constitutional. A final agreement between the FARC and the government was announced from Havana on August 24, with the full text of the final agreement (297 pages) being published later that evening.

=== Ratification ===
On October 2, 2016, the final agreement was submitted to popular ratification in a plebiscite. It failed, with 50.2% voting against it and 49.8% voting in favor, on a 37.4% turnout. Notably, Colombians living in regions that were hardest hit by the conflict, including displaced Colombians abroad, voted in favor, while inland and urban areas that were more insulated voted in larger numbers against it.

On November 24, following the failure of the referendum, the Colombian government and the FARC signed a revised agreement. Colombia's congress approved the revised peace accord. It was then submitted to Congress for approval. On 29 November, the Senate approved the deal by a vote of 75-0, and the House of Representatives approved it the next day by a vote of 130–0, although former President Alvaro Uribe's supporters boycotted the session. Santos welcomed the resolution, while Sergio Jaramillo, the government's peace commissioner, said: "This last part of renegotiation was exhausting. It took us to the limit. But now we pass to something more difficult, which is to change the conditions on the ground and benefit our campesinos. And to assure there is safe transit for the FARC and to worry about the security of communities. [We seek] no more political deaths in Colombia." Uribe's supporters accused the government of giving away too many rights, including FARC's ability to form a political party.

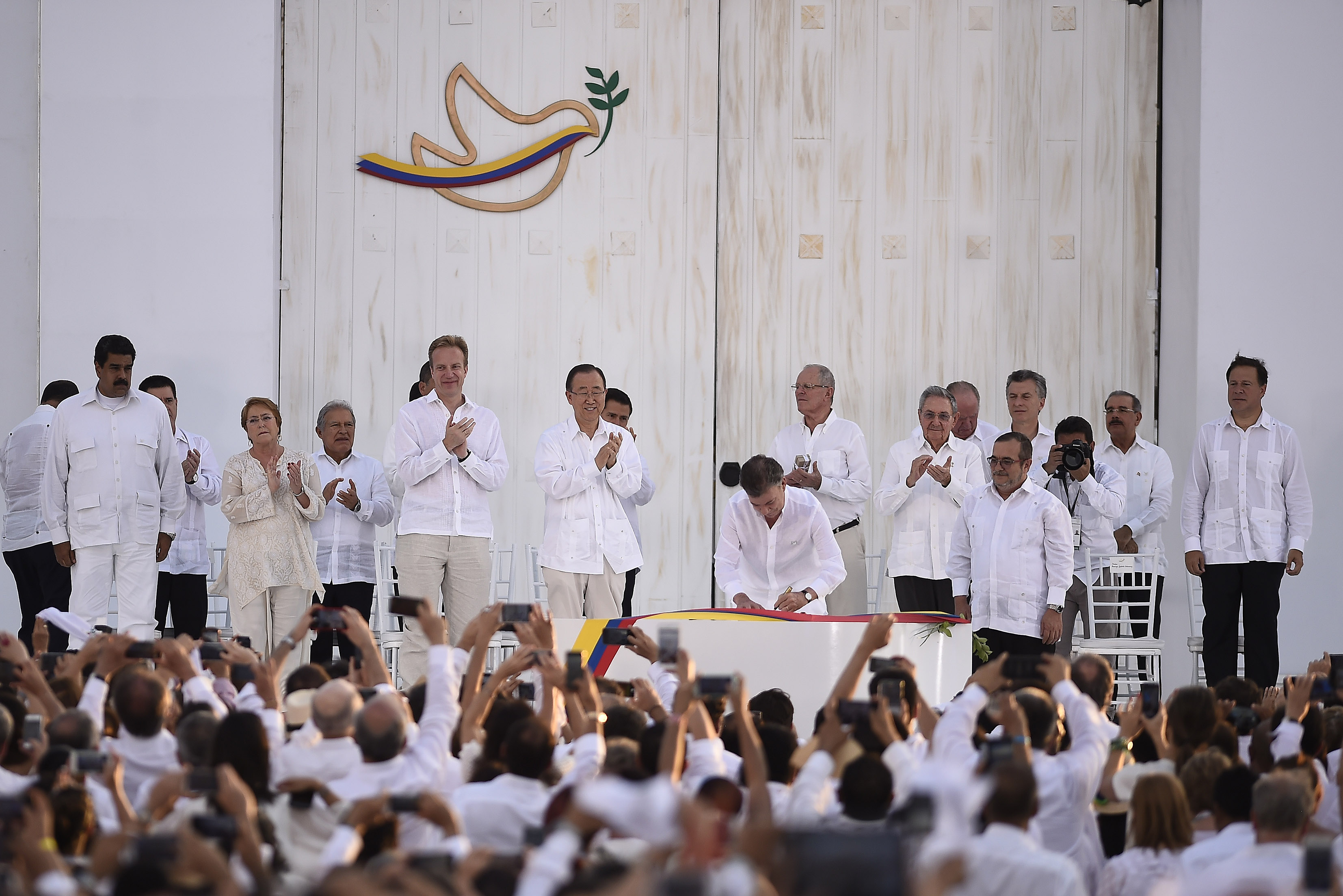
Colombian President Juan Manuel Santos signing the peace treaty with FARC leader Rodrigo Londono Echeverri

The country's highest court ruled in favor of the government's “fast-track” plan to quickly implement the agreement. The government can move laws through Congress more quickly than usual if they are needed to carry out the country's peace deal with the FARC rebels.

=== Women's involvement ===
The Colombian peace negotiations in Havana had higher-than-average participation by women: at times, one-third of delegates in Havana were women, which was "still far from parity but above global averages." The General Agreement guiding the process recognized that the negotiations "require the participation of all, without distinction." When, one year into talks, women and their concerns remained largely absent from the table, women's organizations began to push for greater inclusion. In October 2013, nearly 450 women from across Colombia gathered in Bogota at the National Summit of Women and Peace to demand inclusion in the peace process.

"As the organizations convening the Summit, we told the negotiators in Havana that we did not want peace to be made for us, but to be the peacemakers."

— Marina Gallego, coordinator of the grass-roots organization Ruta Pacifica de las Mujeres.

Two weeks after the National Summit, an agreement was reached in Havana on political participation, wherein both parties formally recognized the important role women have in conflict-prevention, conflict-resolution, and peace-building. Subsequently, President Santos appointed two women with greater decision-making power on behalf of the Colombian Government at the talks. In August 2014, delegations of survivors of the conflict, led by Débora Barros, addressed negotiating parties, 60% of whom were women. This may be the first time that women negotiating on both sides of the table met with women affected by conflict. Representatives of women's organizations and the LGBTI community also addressed negotiators as gender experts, likely making Colombia the first country ever to address LGBTI rights in a peace negotiation.

The equal participation in the construction, implementation, verification, and countersignature of the agreements reached in the Dialogues of Havana are a subject of concern of women's organizations that have historically worked for peace and human rights in the country. The Red de Mujeres (1995), the Ruta Pacífica de las Mujeres (1996), and the Iniciativa de Mujeres por la Paz (2002) are some platforms that have targeted, among other issues, the bilateral cease of fire, demilitarization of civil life, equitable land distribution, respect for human body, justice and differential approaches. By the time the peace process began with the FARC, Colombia's women had already consolidated work in various peace agendas. Therefore, organizations around the country wrote open letters to the government demanding equal participation, supported by UN Women.

Before the end of 2012, when the negotiating of the principle of the end of armed confrontation with the oldest Latin American guerrillas was beginning, Nobel Peace Prize winner Jody Williams sent a letter to Colombian President Juan Manuel Santos claiming a space for women in Havana. At the end of October 2013, with the intention of not having more agreements without the gender perspective, the National Summit of Women for Peace took place in Bogotá, where a national agenda was consolidated and around 500 women from 30 of the 32 departments were representatives. With the motto “las mujeres no queremos ser pactadas, sino ser pactantes” (loosely translated: "women do not want to be part of the deal, but to be parties to the deal"), the 800 proposals that were built were given to the government delegation. In November, the summit published its declaration “Peace and democracy with women suit”, where the experience of the Summit was collected. Proposals insisted on equal participation, demilitarization, bilateral ceasefire, dismantling of paramilitary structures, truth, justice and reparation for all victims and "continue to build peace from the regions and from the everyday, strengthening the experiences of women as peacebuilders".

In September 2014, a dedicated Gender Subcommittee was established at the talks, mandated to ensure that a gender perspective and women's rights were included in all agreements. The Gender Subcommittee of the peace talk is unique in the world. In mid-2014, when the discussion of the agreement for victims was initiated, negotiators announced the creation of the Subcommission of gender with the mission of ensuring a gender approach in partial agreements that had been reached at the moment and in the future settlements. Additional parallel developments have been the empowerment of indigenous women, who created the first National Commission of Indigenous Women; women also created the first permanent dialogue space between civil society and the security sector.

=== The international community ===
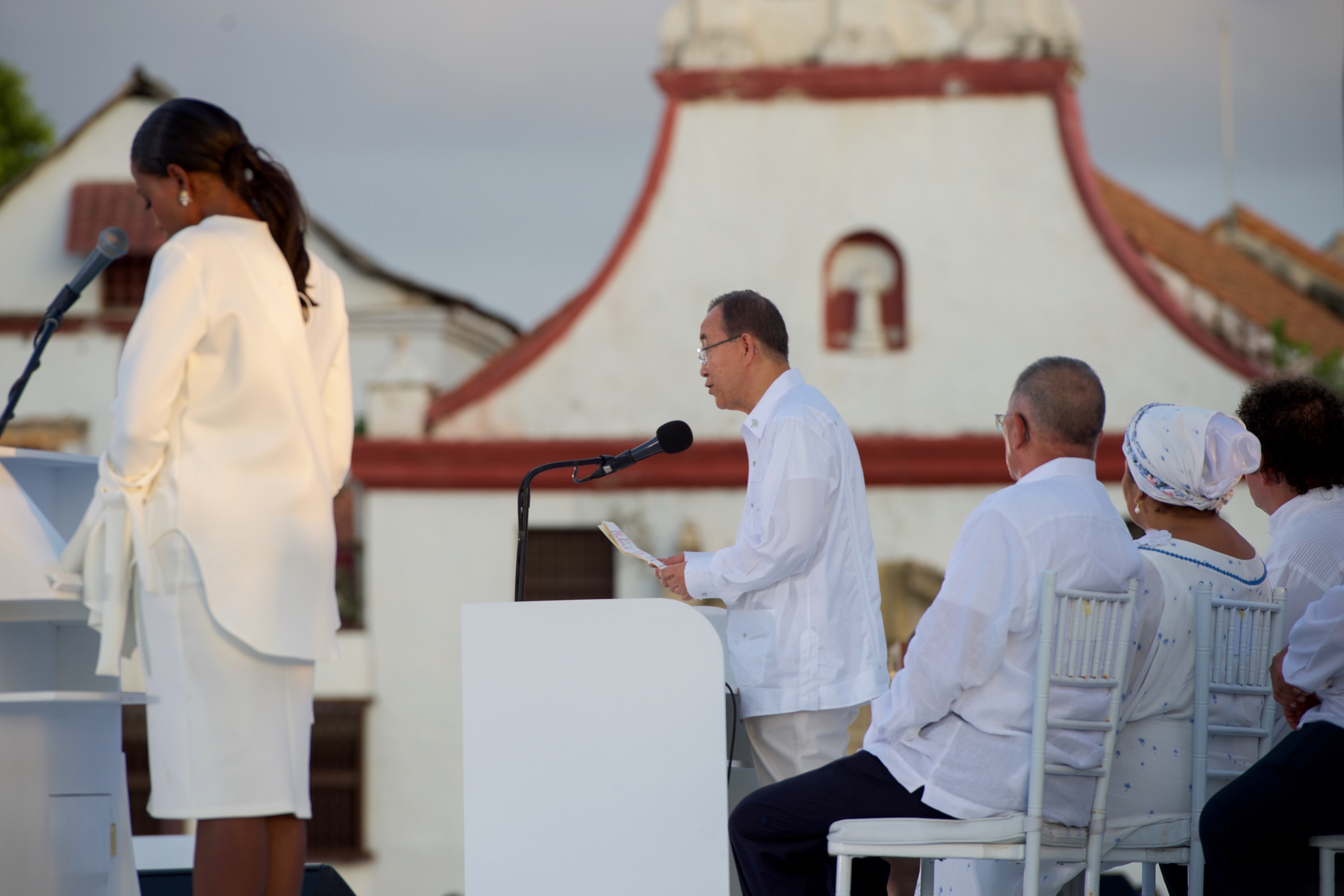
Secretary-General Ban Ki-Moon addresses the crowd at the Colombian peace ceremony in Cartagena where Colombian President Juan Manuel Santos and FARC leader Timoleón Jiménez signed a peace accord on September 26, 2016

The Colombian peace process distinguishes itself from other conflict resolution negotiations because of the level of support and involvement from the international community. The role of international community in the peace process was that of a facilitator and guarantor for the peace talks. On January 25, 2016, the UN Security Council supported the ongoing peace talks in Havana by unanimously adopting resolution S/RES/2261 including the decision to accompany the end of the conflict in Colombia – one of only 14 decisions in its history that the Security Council adopted unanimously. According to the implicit invitation of the conflict parties in section 6.3 of the final agreement, the United Nations currently monitor the conflict parties' compliance with the final agreement, in accordance with resolution S/RES/2435.

The International Committee of the Red Cross (ICRC) served as an independent intermediary during the peace talks and provided logistical support. Apart from transporting FARC negotiators to the peace talks in Havana, the ICRC was also involved in several hostage rescues, and conducted rescue operations of FARC fighters and Colombian military personnel.

The peace process and the Havana peace talks were supported by the governments of Norway and Cuba, with both countries serving as guarantors of the final agreement. The involvement of Norway and Cuba contributed to the mutual trust of the conflict parties and to the credibility of the peace process. While the involvement of third parties in the drafting of peace agreements does not alter the legal status of the peace agreement, it contributed to the successful conclusion of the negotiation. In contrast, the lack of involvement from the international community in the peace negotiations during the presidency of Andrés Pastrana is said to have contributed to the failure of the negotiations.

Norway also contributed to the peace process by sending an investigation team to determine and establish the zones contaminated by anti-personnel mines and other explosives of the civil war. Norway and Cuba also made the peace negotiations possible by providing a meeting venue, since the peace talks were formally inaugurated in Oslo, Norway, on October 18, 2012, and then moved to their permanent location in Havana, Cuba.

The governments of Chile and Venezuela served as observer states during the peace talks. The peace process also received the support of a number of other governments in Latin America, such as Venezuelan President Hugo Chávez, President of Ecuador Rafael Correa, and President of Bolivia Evo Morales.

The Security Council of the United Nations underlined the important role of third countries during the Colombian peace process in resolution A/RES/2261. According to Juan Manuel Santos, the peace process would not have been successful without the support of the international community.

== Contents of the agreements ==
Colombia-FARC peace agreement
"Final Peace Agreement between the Government of Colombia and the FARC-EP" Acuerdo Final para la Terminación del Conflicto y la Construcción de una Paz Estable y Duradera
- Type: Peace agreement
- Context: Attempting to end the Colombian conflict
- Signed: September 26, 2016; 10 years ago (first version); November 24, 2016; 9 years ago (final revison)
- Location: Havana, Cuba and Oslo, Norway
- Effective: November 30, 2016
- Mediators: Cuba; Norway
- Negotiators: Humberto de La Calle; Iván Márquez
- Parties: Colombia; FARC
- Languages: Spanish

=== Comprehensive rural development (May 26, 2013) ===
Extremely unequal land ownership is both a cause and a consequence of the Colombian armed conflict. In 1960, 0.4% of landowners held 30% of all farmland. By 1997, the concentration of land ownership was further accentuated, with 0.35% of landowners holding 45% of all farmland with 86% owning just 13%. In 2012, 1% of landowners (those owning large properties over 200 hectares) held 43% of the land, and an additional 13% of landowners (those owning medium-sized properties over 20 hectares) held 39% of the land. 79% of landowners had properties of less than 10 hectares (considered microfundio and minifundio), which accounted for just 11% of private rural land. The 2014 Agricultural Census reported that 0.4% of agricultural production units (over 500 hectares) occupy 77.6% of the country's rural area, while 71% of agricultural production units (less than 5 hectares) occupy just 2% of rural land area. On the largest landholdings (over 1,000 hectares), an average of only 28% of the land is used for agricultural purposes with the remainder of the land covered by natural vegetation, confirming common accusations that the land is underutilized. The 2014 census also showed that, since 1960, the fragmentation of smallholdings had increased – production units of less than 5 hectares increased from 63% of 71% of the total number of such units – while the weight of large landholdings (over 500 hectares) in the total rural land area had increased significantly from 40% to 77.6%. The inequitable land distribution has increased since 2000, as measured by the Gini coefficient for land ownership – 0.885 in 2009, compared to 0.877 in 2000. Colombia is one of the countries with the highest inequality in rural property in Latin America and the world.

Poverty in rural Colombia is significantly higher than in the cities. In 2014, Colombia's multidimensional poverty rate was about 21%, but in rural areas poverty was 45%.

The expansion and escalation of the armed conflict since the 1980s has greatly contributed to the consolidation of inequality in land distribution, through the illegal dispossession of land, forced displacement and re-concentration of ownership. The scale of land dispossession is disputed, but is estimated that as high as 6.6 million hectares were illegally seized (by drug traffickers, paramilitaries, agribusiness, the government, or the guerrilla) over the last two decades.

Agrarian reform has been one of the FARC's main causes since the guerrilla group's foundation in 1964. However, since then, the FARC's demands on agrarian reform have evolved significantly. In 1964, the nascent guerrilla force called for the confiscation of Latifundia so they could be delivered for free to farmers. In 1982, at their seventh conference, the FARC issued a "law" for agrarian reform abolishing land owned by foreign, oil, mining, banana or timber companies and latifundio properties over 1,500 hectares, to be turned over to the FARC for distribution to farmers. During the Caguán peace process, the FARC demanded the recovery of unproductive land for agrarian reform. The FARC arrived in Havana with moderated views on the subject – their proposals included stimulation of agricultural use of land for food production to achieve food sovereignty, empowering rural communities, and formalization of title to land.

Comprehensive rural reform and development was the first item on the general agreement between the government and the FARC, and a partial agreement was signed in May 2013. The agreement has four cornerstones: access to land and land use, the establishment of special development programs, poverty reduction and eradication of extreme poverty, and food security. The main measures laid out include:

- A Land Fund would be created, to provide "comprehensive access" to land for landless or land-poor peasants. The lands would be acquired through judicial expiration of ownership, recovery of illegally acquired land, expropriation for the social interest or public utility or unexploited lands. The land would be accompanied by a comprehensive subsidy, credits, technical assistance, housing, marketing and access to means of production provided by the government. Redistributed land would be inalienable and non-transferable for a period of seven years.
- A "massive" formalization of property titles for small and medium rural properties. It is estimated that a fifth of all rural properties, and nearly half of small ones, have title problems; a problem which prevents the existence of a real market for land and investments and which has facilitated land dispossession during the conflict.
- The creation of an agricultural jurisdiction to ensure effective legal protection for rural inhabitants' property rights.
- Update and modernization of the rural cadastre and rural property tax. Creation of a new high-level body formulating general guidelines for land use and implementing re-conversion programs. The agreement would strengthen citizen participation in land use planning, with mechanisms for consultation with all levels of government and ethnic minorities.
- The government would delimit the agricultural frontier and protect areas of special environmental interest.
- The establishment of special development programs with a territorial approach (PDET) to achieve structural transformation of rural Colombia, in priority those regions which have been most affected by the conflict and poverty. The action plans would be developed in a participatory manner aimed at fostering regional transformation.
- Implementation of national plans for comprehensive rural reform, aimed at reducing poverty by 50% and eradicating extreme poverty within a transitional phase of 10 years. These plans would include infrastructure (roads, irrigation, electricity, internet connectivity), social development (health, education, housing, drinking water), incentives for the productivity of family agriculture (technical assistance, cooperative economy, special lines of credit, subsidized crop insurance, marketing) and rural labour formalization.
- A Food security system which would include food and nutritional councils at all territorial levels, programs against hunger and malnutrition, measures to strengthen local and regional markets and promotion of proper food handling practices for families.

=== Political participation (November 6, 2013) ===
The transformation from a guerrilla movement to a political party has been one of the FARC's main public aims since the beginning of negotiations. At the same time, their potential political participation is one of the most unpopular points of the peace process.

The FARC considers Colombia to have a non-democratic political system marked by state terrorism and has demanded a "democratic opening", which includes not only institutional reforms but broader popular participation for social movements and greater direct democracy. The government considers the 1991 Constitution to have created a more democratic political system, with different possibilities for popular participation in politics.

A partial agreement on political participation, the second point of the agenda, was announced on November 6, 2013. This agreement seeks to strengthen the participation of all Colombians in politics and public affairs, and the expansion of democracy as a way to resolve conflicts peacefully and finally break the link between politics and armed confrontation. The three main points of this agreement are greater citizen participation, a democratic opening, and breaking the link between politics and weapons. The main measures are:

- Creation of a statute of the opposition following the signature of the final agreement, following discussions in a commission made of legally recognized political parties and movements. No legislation defining guarantees for opposition parties has ever been adopted, despite being required by article 112 of the 1991 Constitution.
- Security guarantees for political activities, through the creation of a Comprehensive Security System. These security guarantees would be aimed at protecting those who participate in politics by respecting their human rights and dignity, preventing violence, and instilling a culture of tolerance and coexistence to prevent stigmatization and persecution of political leaders.
  - The security guarantees, including the structure of the Comprehensive Security System, were fleshed out on June 23, 2016. The Comprehensive Security System, led by a high-level body and a technical committee, would implement a protection program to protect members of the new party or movement founded by the FARC. For such purposes, a dedicated sub-unit of the National Protection Unit (which would include demobilized members of the FARC) and a security and protection body (with members of the FARC's political movement, in liaison with the National Police), would be created. A National Commission of Security Guarantees, chaired by the president, would design and monitor public and criminal policies aimed at the dismantlement of any organization contravening the agreement. The security guarantees would also extend to social movements and human rights defenders. Security and protection guarantees are particularly important for the FARC, whose greatest fear is a repeat of the extermination of the Patriotic Union (UP) in the 1980s, when over one thousand members of the left-wing political party (founded in 1985 with the FARC's participation following the La Uribe ceasefire agreement in 1984) were assassinated by paramilitaries and agents of the state.
- Creation of 16 Special Temporary Peace Constituencies for the election of representatives to the Chamber of Representatives for two terms (2018–2022, 2022–2026). These districts would be created in the regions most affected by the conflict, which are also the regions where the FARC are strongest. The inhabitants of these regions would be able to elect, during the transitional phase and on a temporary basis, additional members to the lower house with special rules. Candidates must be regular residents of the districts or displaced from them in the process of returning, and may be registered by social movements or community organizations. This is separate from the provision granting FARC 10 seats in Congress (5 in each house). In the revised agreement, FARC is prohibited from running in these zones. A member of the National Electoral Council is expected to table a constitutional amendment to create these constituencies. According to this bill, there would be thirteen single-member constituencies (in addition to regular seats) for three terms, or twelve years, with candidates elected representing social organizations and not political parties with congressional representation. The Peace and Reconciliation Foundation also proposed the creation of nine ex officio seats for the FARC in the Senate. The proposal has generated significant public debate.
- Facilitate the creation of new political parties and detach the attainment and conservation of parties' legal status from the requirement to surpass the threshold in congressional elections. During a transitional period of eight years, the state would give special support to the creation of new parties through funding and outreach programs, and adopt measures to promote equality of conditions during electoral campaigns.
- Promotion of electoral participation through national registration, education, information, and outreach campaigns.
- Increase the transparency of the electoral process and transparency in the allocation of government advertising by creating a national court for electoral guarantees, strengthening the investigation of electoral crimes, and ensuring greater transparency in campaign financing.
- Electoral reform, including reform of the electoral bodies, to be discussed by a special electoral mission.
- Promotion of a democratic and participatory political culture based on respect for democratic values and principles, transparent management of public management (banning patronage and corruption), and integration of marginalized communities (women, LGBTI, Afro-Colombians and indigenous peoples).
- Creation of new media spaces for political parties and movements, with a new institutional television channel for parties to publicize their platforms and to publicize the work of organizations and social movements.
- A guarantees law for social organizations and movements which will, among other things, guarantee their access to information, right to reply, and correction and participation in decision making.
- Guarantees for social protests, including both protesters and other citizens.
- Increased civic participation in institutional, regional, and local media in order to inform about the activities of different civil society organizations.
- Measures to promote a culture of tolerance, non-stigmatization, and reconciliation, to be overseen by a National Council for Reconciliation and Coexistence.
- Citizen oversight and control to ensure the transparency of public management and proper use of resources.
- Promote the participation and influence of citizens in territorial planning and budgeting, with the creation of Territorial Planning Councils which would draw from various organizations and movements.

In July 2016, the negotiating parties announced through a joint communiqué the composition of the commissions which would study the opposition statute, electoral reform, and the guarantees law for social organizations and movements.

The final agreement, announced on August 24, establishes guarantees for the new political party or movement to be created by the demobilized FARC following the end of the decommissioning process. The representatives of the FARC would formally register their new political movement before the National Electoral Council, providing their act of creation, party statutes, code of ethics, ideological platform, and appointment of its leadership. As a result of this formal registration, the new party would be recognized as a legally constituted and recognized party under Colombian law, and it would have to comply with all the legal requirements to remain a legally registered party, except for membership requirements and, until 2026, the electoral threshold (3% of votes nationally) required for other parties to maintain their legal status. To facilitate the FARC's transformation into a political party, it would receive, until 2026, public financial assistance equivalent to 10% of the annual budget for political parties and, until 2022, an additional 5% of said budget. The presidential and senatorial candidates of the new party would receive public funding for the 2018 and 2022 elections.

In addition, following the conclusion of the decommissioning process, the government would amend the constitution and laws as necessary to allow for the temporary, ex officio participation of the FARC's new party in the Congress for two terms beginning in July 2018. Although the party's lists, either alone or in coalition, would compete equally for seats in both houses, the new party would be guaranteed five seats in each house, including those won according to regular electoral rules. Until 2018, the FARC would be represented in each house of Congress by three speakers who would only be allowed to participate in the debates for the constitutional and legal reforms which would follow the adoption of the final agreement. The FARC's new party would also be entitled to transitory representation in the National Electoral Council.

=== Illicit drugs (May 16, 2014) ===
Drug cultivation, production, and trafficking has been inextricably linked to the Colombian armed conflict for decades, having served as the main source of financing for most illegal armed groups (including the FARC), while playing a central role in the Colombian and foreign governments' responses to the internal conflict. Colombia continues to be the world's single largest producer of cocaine and coca leaves. The land area under coca cultivation had decreased from over 140,000 hectares in 2001 due to aerial coca eradication and manual eradication, but there has been an increase in coca cultivation since 2013, with 96,000 hectares under coca cultivation in 2015, according to the latest United Nations Office on Drugs and Crime (UNODC) report, representing a 39% increase on the previous year. The majority (81%) of coca cultivation is concentrated in four southern departments (Nariño, Cauca, Putumayo, Caquetá) and in Norte de Santander Department, which are also regions with a substantial FARC presence. The UNODC suggests that different negotiations on the issue, in Havana and other settings, are generating incentives for increased coca cultivation because of the perception that the benefits of development projects would mainly be directed at coca cultivators.

The FARC are involved in all stages of production, from coca cultivation to wholesale drug trade. In the 1990s, the FARC successfully co-opted some cocalero (coca cultivators) movements, and was originally involved primarily in the production stage, while paramilitary groups dominated the more lucrative drug trafficking operations. However, by the second half of the 1990s, the dismantling of the Medellín and Cali cartels and the dissolution of the Soviet Union triggered the entrance of the FARC into the drug trafficking business. A recent investigation by the Colombian attorney general's office concluded that FARC units are involved both directly and indirectly in cultivation, processing, and distribution: directly as owners of crops, laboratories, and crystallization workshops, as well as the distribution corridors, and contacting clients including national and international drug cartels; indirectly by providing security to crops or labs, organizing peasants in anti-eradication marches, setting product prices, charging taxes on the product, or by providing security to third-party drug traffickers in return for a fee. The study also estimated the guerrilla's revenues from narcotics and related taxes at over US$22,900,000 (66,277,978,247 pesos) between 1995 and 2014.

The FARC adamantly reject that they are drug traffickers, but have admitted to financing their activities through taxes levied at different stages of the drug production process (on producers, buyers, laboratory production, and landing strips). The Colombian and American governments have considered the FARC to be one of the world's leading drug trafficking organizations. Although "Mexican transnational criminal organizations (TCOs) remain the greatest criminal drug threat to the United States" according to the US Drug Enforcement Administration's 2015 National Drug Threat Assessment Summary, "the FARC-EP are increasingly working with Mexican TCOs to smuggle ton quantities of cocaine into the United States." The report indicates ties between the FARC and Mexican drug cartels including Los Zetas, Beltrán-Leyva Cartel, Jalisco New Generation Cartel, and the Sinaloa Cartel. In Havana, the FARC claimed that "the traditional drug policy of the Colombian state has been focused on the persecution of the weakest elements of the drug-trafficking chain: cultivators and consumers."

In 1999, in response to the large increase in domestic cocaine production activities and the deterioration of security conditions, the Colombian and US governments announced Plan Colombia, a joint anti-drug strategy. The main aims of the Plan were a 50% reduction in the production and trafficking of illegal drugs within six years and an improvement of security conditions in Colombia. US funding for the military component of Plan Colombia was on average US$540 million per year between 2000 and 2008, while the Colombian government invested approximately US$812 million per year. Following the September 11 attacks, Plan Colombia resources began to be used for anti-guerrilla operations. Over 80% of US aid to Colombia between 2000 and 2007 was military assistance, which came to reinforce the modernization of the Colombian armed forces under the Pastrana and Uribe administrations.

Since the start of Plan Colombia, the main strategy for reducing cocaine production was the aerial spraying of coca plantations with herbicides such as glyphosate. Since 2000, more than 1,600,000 hectares of coca crops have been sprayed and more than 413,000 have been manually eradicated. Aerial spraying of illicit crops is both very expensive and ineffective – for each hectare sprayed with glyphosate, coca crops are reduced by about 0.02 to 0.065 hectares, so 32 hectares of coca need to be sprayed to eradicate just one hectare (an effectiveness rate of just 4.2%). The marginal cost of removing one kilogram of cocaine from the market through spraying is roughly $240,000. Aerial spraying has a negative impact on the environment (deforestation, water pollution, harm to ecosystems), health (skin problems, respiratory illnesses, miscarriages), and contributes to internal displacement.

After 2006, Colombian anti-drug policies shifted towards interdiction strategies (cocaine seizures, lab destruction, dismantling cartels), which have been far more effective than eradication strategies. These policies caused a major supply shock (increasing the street price of cocaine in the US), greatly reduced the net cocaine supply, and led to major changes in drug trafficking operations (shifting them towards Central America and Mexico). Juan Manuel Santos, who had been responsible for the post-2006 drug strategy as defence minister, continued these policies as president. The Colombian government now addresses drug consumption from a public health angle and advocates for alternative development strategies in vulnerable regions affected by coca cultivation, while adopting a "rational and efficient" strategy against criminal activities tied to drug trafficking. As part of this new policy, in October 2015 the government ordered the suspension of aerial aspersion with glyphosate.

==== Agreement measures ====
The partial agreement between the FARC and the government on illicit drugs, announced in May 2014, reflects this paradigmatic shift away from the traditional militaristic approach and towards the voluntary substitution of illicit crops and social transformations in affected territories. The main measures announced are:

- Substitution of illicit crops, through a joint process of participatory planning with the affected communities to ensure their active and effective participation in the decision-making process and in the joint construction of solutions. The program would be a component of comprehensive rural development, within a framework of territorial integration and social inclusion with a differential approach taking into account the realities of different regions. The objectives would be promotion of the voluntary substitution of crops, poverty reduction, productive opportunities for the cultivators, sustainable development, strengthened communities and strengthening the presence of the State. In cases where no agreement with the community is reached, the State would proceed with the eradication of illicit crops, prioritizing manual eradication wherever possible.
- Participatory planning processes to find solutions to illicit crops and poverty, in order to establish a new alliance between the communities and the three levels of government to solve communities' problems.
- Immediate assistance plans for illicit crops growers would be put in place. These would include immediate food assistance, projects of quick income generation, options of seasonal employment for migrant collectors, education, early childhood assistance, generation of employment options, and infrastructure projects.
- An evidence-based public health and human rights policy approach to the problem of drug use, based on the view that drug use is a phenomenon of a multi-causal nature. State institutions, in coordination with communities and families, would establish a national attention system including rehabilitation and social insertion measures.
- Comprehensive strategy to dismantle and prosecute drug trafficking organizations.
- Strengthen the fight against money laundering in all economic sectors.
- Establish strict controls on the production and trafficking of chemical inputs for drug production.
- Promotion of an international conference within the framework of the United Nations to objectively evaluate the war on drugs and seek to build a new consensus around the adjustments deemed necessary, taking into account the discussions and new international developments on the matter.

In announcing the partial agreement on illicit drugs, the FARC committed to "contribute in an effective manner, with utmost determination and in different forms and through practical actions towards the final solution to the problem of illicit drugs, and to end any relationship that, based on their rebellion, may have taken place with this phenomenon." Furthermore, the joint communiqué stated the construction of lasting peace requires everybody's "willingness to contribute to the elucidation of the relationship between conflict and the growing, production and marketing of illicit drugs and money laundering that result from this phenomenon."

=== Victims (December 15, 2015) ===
The fifth point on the general agreement for negotiations was victims; a vast and complex item which included important issues such as transitional justice, reparations, truth and victims' rights. The item was one of the most complicated for the two parties to find an agreement on. The FARC, which claimed that its insurgency was justified and that it was not militarily defeated, initially refused to submit to the laws and institutions of a political system which it opposed. On the other hand, the government had the obligation to design a transitional justice system which would be satisfactory to the FARC (who sought restorative justice) but also in keeping with Colombia's international treaty obligations, notably the Rome Statute of the International Criminal Court. Complicating issues further, both the FARC and the government have historically refused to admit responsibility for crimes they have committed, with the guerrilla group considering itself a victim of State oppression and the Colombian government considering itself to be the leader and defender of a democratic society.

In June 2014, the two delegations in Havana announced a set of ten principles which would guide their discussions on the victims issue. These principles were: recognition of victims, recognition of responsibility, satisfaction of victims' rights, victims' participation, elucidation of the truth, reparations for victims, guarantees of protection and security, guarantees of non-repetition, reconciliation, and a rights-based approach.

The various components of the full agreement on victims were gradually announced to the general public throughout 2015, with the cornerstone agreement on the "special jurisdiction for peace" being announced on September 23, 2015. On December 15, 2015, a full partial agreement on victims was announced. Taken as a whole, the agreement creates a Comprehensive System of Truth, Justice, Reparation and Non-Repetition (Sistema Integral de Verdad, Justicia, Reparación y no Repetición). The system would seek to satisfy the rights of all victims of the armed conflict, including victims of the guerrillas, the State, and paramilitarism. Access to judicial benefits under the Comprehensive System would be conditional on contributing to the elucidation of the truth and reparations.

The Comprehensive System is made up of five components: Commission for the Clarification of Truth, Coexistence and Non-repetition; Special unit for the search of missing persons in the context of and due to the armed conflict; Special Jurisdiction for Peace; Comprehensive reparation measures for peace-building and guarantees of non-repetition.

==== Truth commission ====
A truth commission, entitled the "Commission for the Clarification of Truth, Coexistence and Non-recurrence" (Comisión para el esclarecimiento de la verdad, la convivencia y la no repetición), would be created following the signature of the final agreement. Its aim is to contribute to the construction and preservation of historical memory, reach an understanding of the conflict's multiple dimensions, satisfy victims' rights, and promote coexistence. The commission would be centered on victims (their dignification and satisfaction of their right to the truth), and its work would be impartial, independent, transitory, and extrajudicial. It would require broad participation, working at a national level but with a territorial approach (with the aim of achieving a better understanding of the regional dynamics of the conflict), and a differential and gender-based approach (it would consider the different experiences, impacts, and conditions of persons because of their sex, gender, age, ethnicity, or disabilities).

As an extrajudicial mechanism, the truth commission's activities would be non-judicial in nature and would not imply criminal responsibility for those testifying before it, nor would the testimonies be transferred to judicial authorities; although the commission may request information from judges and investigative bodies as required for its work.

The commission would have a mandate to clarify practices which constitute serious human rights, collective responsibilities for these practices, the social and human impact of the conflict on society and different groups, the impact of the conflict on politics and democracy, the historical context of the conflict with its multiple causes, and the factors and conditions which contributed to the persistence of the conflict. To do so, the commission would investigate all the aforementioned elements, hold public hearings, present a final report, diffuse its work, ensure the gender mainstreaming throughout its work, and be periodically accountable. The government and the FARC have committed to contribute to the clarification of the truth and to recognize their respective responsibilities before the commission.

The commission would be composed of 11 members, chosen by the selection mechanism for the Special Jurisdiction for Peace (see below). The commission would work for three years, following a six months preparation period.

==== Search unit for missing persons ====
The Special Unit for the Search of Missing Persons in the context and due to the armed conflict (Unidad especial para la búsqueda de personas dadas por desaparecidas en el contexto y en razón del conflicto armado) would be a special high-level unit created following the signature of the final agreement. It would direct and coordinate efforts to search for and locate missing persons, or find their remains so that they may be returned to their families. To carry out its work, the search unit would collect the necessary information about missing persons, analyze the information collected, strengthen and streamline processes for identifying mortal remains in coordination with the National Institute of Legal Medicine and Forensic Sciences, guarantee families' participation, and present an official report to families informing them of the fate of missing relatives. The search unit would be administrative and financially independent and autonomous, complementing the other components of the Comprehensive System.

==== Special Jurisdiction for Peace ====
The Special Jurisdiction for Peace (Jurisdicción Especial para la Paz, JEP) would be the transitional justice component of the Comprehensive System, complying with Colombia's duty to investigate, clarify, prosecute, and punish serious human rights violations and grave breaches of international humanitarian law which occurred during the armed conflict. Its objectives would be to satisfy victims' right to justice, offer truth to the public, contribute to the reparation of victims, contribute to the fight against impunity, adopt decisions which give full legal security to direct and indirect participants in the conflict, and contribute to the achievement of a stable and lasting peace.

The JEP's guiding principles would be the centrality of victims; legal security (the JEP's decisions would be res judicata and immutable); conditionality; the right to peace; comprehensiveness as a component of the broader Comprehensive System; indivisibility (the JEP would apply to all who participated directly or indirectly in the conflict); prevalence over other criminal, disciplinary or administrative proceedings for acts committed in the armed conflict; guarantees of due process; differential focus taking into account the different consequences of crimes against women and against the most vulnerable groups; gender equality, and concentration on the most serious and representative cases.

Following the end of the armed conflict, the government would "grant the broadest possible amnesty" (as per section 5, article 6 of Protocol II of the Geneva Conventions) for rebels who have subscribed to a final peace agreement with the State (crime of rebellion) and for those accused or condemned for political and related offences, as permitted by the Colombian Constitution. Amnesty or pardon does not absolve one from the obligation to contribute, individually or collectively, to the clarification of the truth. An amnesty law adopted by Congress would clearly determine those crimes eligible for amnesty or pardon and those which are not, as well as the definition of related offences. Political offences include rebellion, sedition, military uprising, illegal possession of weapons, death in combat compatible with international law, agreement to commit an offence for the purpose of rebellion, and other related offences. Related offences would be defined by an inclusive and restrictive criteria; the first including offences specifically related to the development of the rebellion during the conflict, offences in which the passive subject is the State and any actions aimed at facilitating, supporting, financing or hiding the development of rebellion. In all circumstances, crimes against humanity, genocide, serious war crimes, hostage taking or other severe deprivations of physical liberty, torture, extrajudicial executions, forced disappearance, violent sexual intercourse and other kinds of sexual violence, child abduction, forced displacement, and the recruitment of minors would not be eligible for amnesty or pardon.

The Colombian Supreme Court has ruled that drug trafficking is a related offence to rebellion, as long as this activity was conducted to finance the insurgency. The inclusion of drug trafficking has generated significant controversy in Colombia. The government, pro-government legislators, the Ombudsman, and then-attorney general supported the inclusion of drug trafficking as a related offence, arguing that it was used to finance the rebellion. Senator Álvaro Uribe and inspector general Alejandro Ordóñez have strongly opposed its inclusion as a related offence, with Uribe stating that drug trafficking was tied to terrorism rather than political ends.

The final agreement, in its annexes, includes the text of the amnesty law which would be presented to Congress. There would be three types of offences: ones directly eligible for amnesty (those most closely related to membership in the guerrilla), ones which would never be eligible for amnesty, and others which would be defined in the amnesty chamber of the JEP (including drug trafficking and kidnapping).

Crimes which are not eligible for amnesty or pardon would be submitted to the JEP, which would have jurisdiction over anyone who participated directly or indirectly in the armed conflict: combatants of illegal armed groups who have subscribed to a final peace agreement with the State, agents of the State who committed crimes in the conflict, and third parties who directly or indirectly participated in the conflict without being members of an armed group. The JEP would have jurisdiction over non-coercive financing of or collaboration with paramilitary groups for persons who had a "determinant participation in the most serious and representative crimes." However, members of paramilitary groups who demobilized and appeared before an ordinary court or the justice and peace tribunals would not be under the competence of the JEP; although the government would commit to adopting measures to strengthen the clarification of the paramilitary phenomenon. Colombian Presidents, who benefit from a special constitutional status (article 174), would not be subject to the JEP. In the JEP, there would be "a special, simultaneous, balanced and equitable treatment" for agents of the State, founded on international humanitarian law and the military's operational rules.

It was agreed in the final agreement that the legal sentences of all FARC combatants convicted of offences within the JEP's jurisdiction would be suspended until the JEP has been formed and has handled the individual's respective case.

Two procedures would be applied, the first procedure in the case of acknowledgment of truth and acknowledgment of responsibility and the second procedure in the absence of acknowledgment of truth and responsibility. Responsibility would be publicly acknowledged collectively or individually in the year following the creation of the JEP; in the case of a collective acknowledgement of responsibility, individuals named may express their disagreement, in which case they would be subject to the second procedure.

The Special Jurisdiction for Peace would be composed of the following five bodies and an executive secretariat:

1. Chamber of Acknowledgment of Truth, Responsibility and establishment of facts and conduct (Sala de Reconocimiento de Verdad y Responsabilidad y de Determinación de los Hechos y Conductas): The chamber would be the organizer of all the cases received by the jurisdiction, filtering cases to concentrate on the most serious and representative crimes not eligible for amnesty. It would receive reports from the Attorney General, Inspector General, Comptroller General, the military criminal justice system, victims' organizations, human rights organizations, as well as any relevant legal investigations and judgments. Having determined whether the cases received fall under the JEP's jurisdiction, it would group the reports by alleged/convicted perpetrator and similar conducts and present reports on practices or events, identifying all responsible and their shares of responsibility. On the basis of these reports, those individuals identified would acknowledge or deny their responsibility, individually or collectively. The Chamber would present a resolution of conclusions to the Peace Tribunal, with emphasis on the most serious and representative crimes, individualization of responsibilities, acknowledgements of responsibility and the identification of the appropriate sanctions. In cases without acknowledgement of responsibility, the Chamber would transmit the cases to the Investigation and Prosecution Unit for it to begin proceedings as appropriate. The Chamber would have considerable autonomy to manage its own affairs, set its rules, form working commissions, establish priorities, adopt criteria for selection and decongestion or define the sequence in which cases would be addressed.
2. Amnesty and Pardon Chamber (Sala de Amnistía e Indulto): On the basis of the amnesty law, the chamber would grant amnesty to persons sentenced or investigated for offences eligible for amnesty or pardon and decide on the admissibility of amnesties recommended by the Chamber of Acknowledgment. In the event that the request or recommendation for pardon or amnesty is ineligible, the amnesty chamber would remit the case to the Chamber of Acknowledgment.
3. Chamber for the Definition of Legal Situations (Sala de Definición de Situaciones Jurídicas): The definition chamber would be responsible for defining the legal situation of those who are ineligible for amnesty but not included in the Chamber of Acknowledgment's resolution of conclusions. In defining these persons' legal situations, it would have the power to decide whether to continue legal proceedings. It would also have the responsibility of determining possible procedural mechanisms to select and prioritize the cases of those who have not acknowledged responsibility.
4. Investigation and Prosecution Unit (Unidad de Investigación y Acusación): The investigation and indictment unit would handle the cases in which responsibility has not been acknowledged. It would investigate and, when necessary, lay charges before the Peace Tribunal, or refer the cases to the defining chamber or amnesty chamber. In the course of its investigations, it may decide on protective measures for victims and witnesses. The unit would include a forensics research team and a special investigation unit for cases of sexual violence.
5. Peace Tribunal (Tribunal para la Paz), itself further subdivided into five sections: first instance in cases of acknowledgment of responsibility, first instance in cases of absence of acknowledgment of responsibility, appeals section, revision section and stability and effectiveness section.
  1. First instance in cases of acknowledgment of responsibility: In cases where responsibility is acknowledged, this section of the tribunal would evaluate the correspondence between the acknowledged acts (and those responsible for them) with the sanctions proposed by the Chamber of Acknowledgment's resolution of conclusions. It would then impose the appropriate sanctions, establish the conditions and modalities for implementing them and supervise compliance with the sentence in cooperation with the monitoring and verification bodies and mechanisms.
  2. First instance in cases of absence of acknowledgment of responsibility: The section would take cognizance of the charges laid by the Investigation and Prosecution Unit, proceed with an adversarial trial for those cases where responsibility has not been acknowledged and, when appropriate, render judgment and imposing alternative or ordinary sanctions when necessary.
  3. Revision section: The revision section would revise the cases of those already convicted by the ordinary courts and decide on the appropriate sanctions. It would also revise, at the request of the convicted person, the judgments of the ordinary courts dealing with conducts which occurred during the armed conflict when absence of fact or manifest error in the legal judgment is alleged. In addition, the revision section would resolve jurisdictional conflicts between the organs of the JEP and decide on requests for a person's attendance before the JEP.
  4. Appeals section: The appeals section would hear appeals against the judgments of the chambers and sections of the JEP, and victims' appeals against the sections' judgments for infringement of fundamental rights. The rulings rendered by the JEP would be res judicata and immutable.
  5. Stability and effectiveness section: After the Peace Tribunal has fulfilled its duties, this section would be established to ensure the stability and effectiveness of the resolutions and sanctions adopted by the JEP and resolve the cases which emerge following the end of the Tribunal's duties for acts committed before the signature of the final agreement and falling under the JEP's jurisdiction.

The Peace Tribunal would be made up of a total of 20 Colombian and four foreign magistrates, who would be highly qualified experts in various areas of law, particularly international humanitarian law, human rights law, and conflict resolution. Colombian members of the tribunal would need to meet the same requirements as members of the country's three highest courts; namely to be native-born citizens, lawyers, never convicted of any crime besides political offences, and a professional or academic career of fifteen years in the field of law. The three chambers would have a total of 18 Colombian and 6 foreign magistrates. The investigation and prosecution unit would be made up of at least 16 highly qualified legal professionals, 12 of which would be Colombian nationals.

The selection mechanism was announced on August 12, 2016. It is to be made up of representatives appointed by Pope Francis, the Secretary General of the United Nations, the criminal chamber of Colombia's Supreme Court of Justice, the delegation of the International Center for Transitional Justice in Colombia, and the Permanent Commission of the State University System. Members of the selection committee would elect magistrates with a four-fifths majority using a voting system promoting consensus. In addition to the magistrates of the chambers and tribunal, it would also select a list of 12 Colombian and 4 foreign alternates for the tribunal and chambers, the president of the JEP and the president of the Investigation and Prosecution Unit.

===== Sanctions and punishments =====
The agreement guarantees that extradition would not be granted for offences and crimes subject to the jurisdiction of the JEP and committed during the armed conflict prior to the signature of the final agreement. In addition, the imposition of any punishment by the JEP would not limit any right to political participation.

The goal of the punishments imposed would be the satisfaction of victims' rights and the consolidation of peace, and would always be related to the level of acknowledgment of truth and responsibility in collective or individual declarations to the JEP, the gravity of the punished act, the level of participation and responsibility, and the accused's commitment to truth and reparation of the victims. The punishment in cases where there has been acknowledgment of responsibility before the Chamber of Acknowledgment would be lesser than in cases of late or no acknowledgment.

There would be three types of sanctions or punishments: ordinary sanctions of the JEP, alternative sanctions, and ordinary sanctions depending the level and time of acknowledgment of truth and responsibility.

- Ordinary sanctions of the JEP would be imposed to those who acknowledge responsibility in serious offences before the Chamber of Acknowledgment and would have a minimum duration of five years and maximum duration of eight years. The sanctions would have a restorative and reparative aim and involve "effective restrictions of freedom and rights", including restrictions to the freedom of residence and movement which would be monitored and supervised to ensure compliance with the tribunal's orders. These sanctions would in no case involve imprisonment. For those who did not have a "decisive participation" in the commission of the serious acts, the punishment would be between two and five years.

The restorative sanctions would involve participation in projects carried out in rural and urban areas, including construction of infrastructure, environmental conservation, effective reparation for displaced peasants, substitution of illicit crops, rural and urban development, rural electrification, mine clearance and so forth.

- Alternative sanctions would be imposed to those who acknowledge responsibility later, before the first instance of the tribunal. They would serve an essentially retributive function and involve a deprivation of freedom (including imprisonment) for five to eight years (two to five years for those who did not have a "decisive participation").
- Ordinary sentences would be imposed to those found guilty by the tribunal when there has been no acknowledgment of responsibility, and would be served according to provisions of regular criminal law for prison terms no lesser than 15 years and no greater than 20 years. The places where the sentences would be served would be subject to monitoring of a national and international verification body of the Comprehensive System, as well as security and protection measures

==== Reparations ====
Seven measures for comprehensive reparations are laid out in the agreement on victims, with the aim of contributing to the construction of peace, and the recognition of victims and the damages of war. Victims are to be at the heart of all reparation measures.

1. Timely measures for the acknowledgment of collective responsibilities: All responsible parties undertake to participate in formal, public, and solemn acts at the national and territorial levels, recognizing their collective responsibility for damages caused, to ask for forgiveness and manifest their commitment to contribute to concrete measures of reparation.
2. Concrete measures to contribute to reparation: All those who have caused harm in the context of the conflict would be able to participate in concrete restorative actions, which would be taken into account to receive special legal benefits under the JEP. For the FARC, these measures would include reconstruction of infrastructure, mine clearance and decontamination, participation in illicit crop substitution programs, participation in the search for missing persons, and environmental conservation projects (e.g., reforestation). The government would promote the participation in such projects of agents of the State and others who participated (directly or indirectly) in the conflict.
3. Collective reparations at the end of the conflict: Collective reparation processes would include the special development programs with a territorial approach (PDET) in regions most affected by the conflict, territorial collective reparation plans in regions where a PDET would not be implemented, and national collective reparation plans for groups and organizations (women's groups, economic associations, political parties and movements).
4. Psycho-social rehabilitation: Measures for individual emotional recovery and psycho-social rehabilitation plans for coexistence and non-repetition (community rehabilitation strategies for the reconstruction of the social fabric).
5. Collective right to return processes for displaced persons and reparations for victims abroad: For the right of return to displaced persons, the processes would be new collective programs to return and relocate victims of internal displacement, in coordination with other measures. For victims living outside of the national territory (refugees and exiles), the government would implement programs to assist and accompany their return to Colombia.
6. Land restitution measures: Existing land restitution processes would be strengthened to guarantee their coordination with collective reparation processes, territorial development programs, and other plans and programs resulting from the final agreement.
7. Implementation and participative strengthening of victims' reparations policies: Existing forums for victims' participation would be expanded and strengthened to include victims and their organizations not currently part of these forums and ensure their participation therein. The final agreement does not resolve questions about material reparations by the FARC.

==== Non-recurrence ====
The guarantees of non-recurrence would be the result of the implementation of the different mechanisms and measures of the Comprehensive System, measures agreed upon under the "end of the conflict" item and all other points of the final agreement (rural reform, political participation, illicit drugs). These guarantees are part of a broader, overarching shared commitment to respect human rights, promote the rights of all Colombians, coexistence, tolerance, and free political participation.

As part of the guarantees of non-recurrence, the government would implement measures to strengthen human rights promotion mechanisms and the protection mechanisms for human rights organizations and advocates. Specifically, this would include the promotion of a culture of human rights for peace and reconciliation, the strengthening of national information and monitoring systems for human rights, the implementation of human rights education, the strengthening of human rights organizations, the elaboration of a comprehensive protection protocol for human rights organizations, strengthened collaboration with the attorney general's office to follow up on complaints and investigations, the implementation of a national plan for human rights, the adoption of measures and legal modifications to protect social protests and mobilizations, and the creation of an advisory commission on human rights for the government and public institutions.

=== End of the conflict (June 23, 2016 and August 24, 2016) ===
The government and the FARC reached an agreement on three of the main points – bilateral and definite ceasefire, decommissioning of weapons and security guarantees – of the third item on the agenda, "end of the conflict", on June 23, 2016.

==== Bilateral and definite ceasefire ====
The bilateral and definite ceasefire is the definite end of hostilities and offensive actions between the government and the FARC. Following the announcement of the final agreement on August 24, President Juan Manuel Santos declared that the bilateral and definite ceasefire would begin at midnight on Monday, August 29, 2016.

==== Monitoring and Verification Mechanism ====
A tripartite Monitoring and Verification Mechanism (MM&V) would monitor and verify implementation of the agreement and compliance with the rules governing the ceasefire and decommissioning of weapons. The MM&V would be integrated by representatives of the Colombian government, the FARC, and an International Component made up of unarmed United Nations (UN) observers from Community of Latin American and Caribbean States (CELAC) member states. The mechanism would have three instances or levels: one national, eight regional verifying structures, and "some" local monitoring structures. The International Component would preside over all levels of the mechanism, resolve disagreements (such as incidents and violations of the ceasefire or disarmament), present recommendations, and present written reports.

==== Transitory rural settlement normalization zones and encampments ====
23 Transitory rural settlement normalization zones (Zonas Veredales Transitorias de Normalización, ZVTN) and 8 encampents/transitory normalization points (Puntos Transitorios de Normalización, PTN) would be established throughout the country to manage the disarmament of the FARC and assist in their reincorporation in civilian life.

The 23 ZVTN and 8 PTN would be located in 30 municipalities in 15 departments, as follows: Fonseca (Guajira), La Paz (Cesar), Tibú (Norte de Santander), Remedios (Antioquia), Ituango (Antioquia), Dabeiba (Antioquia), Vigía del Fuerte (Antioquia), Riosucio (Chocó), Tierralta (Córdoba), Planadas (Tolima), Villarrica (Tolima), Buenos Aires (Cauca), Caldono (Cauca), Corinto (Cauca), Policarpa (Nariño), Tumaco (Nariño), Puerto Asís (Putumayo), Cartagena del Chairá (Caquetá), La Montañita (Caquetá), San Vicente del Caguán (Caqueta), Arauquita (Arauca), Tame (Arauca), Mesetas (Meta), Vista Hermosa (Meta), La Macarena (Meta), Mapiripán (Meta), Cumaribo (Vichada), San José del Guaviare (Guaviare), Calamar and El Retorno (Guaviare).

The day following the formal signature of the final agreement, the armed forces would make the necessary logistical adjustments to facilitate the FARC's units displacement to these zones. The FARC would begin moving to these zones following mutually agreed routes of deployment. The MM&V would monitor and verify the safe movement of the FARC's units to the zones.

The ZVTN would be located in mutually agreed veredas, or rural settlements, within municipalities and be accessible by land or water. They would be of "reasonable size" to allow monitoring and verification by the MM&V and compliance with the stated objectives of the ZVTN. A one kilometer-wide demilitarized security zone would be created around each ZVTN, in which no military or FARC unit would be permitted entry with the exception of MM&V teams accompanied by the police if necessary. Once all of its men had moved to their ZVTN, the FARC would provide the government with a list of its members present in each ZVTN and the government would suspend arrest warrants for all FARC members located in the zones. While in these zones, the FARC, in coordination with the government, would be allowed to perform any type of training or education for its members. FARC combatants and militiamen would be allowed to leave the zones only in civilian clothing and without weapons.

The normal functioning of unarmed elected civilian authorities within these zones would not be impeded in any way, and representatives of these civilian local authorities would have the right to permanently enter these zones, except for encampments where the FARC would be concentrated. There would be civilian populations within the FARC's encampments in the zones, and civilians' legal right to bear arms would be suspended for the entire duration of the zones.

The MM&V would be charged with monitoring and verifying compliance with the mutually agreed rules governing the ZVTN. In the case that events or circumstances within the zone require the presence of the National Police or any other public authority, its entry would be coordinated by the MM&V. For the duration of the agreement on the ceasefire and disarmament, the FARC would designate a group of 60 disarmed members to travel throughout the national territory in performance of tasks related to the peace agreement; likewise, within each zone, a group of 10 members of the guerrilla would travel within the municipality and department for the same reasons.

The government and the FARC have jointly defined security protocols to guarantee the security and protection of persons (MM&V observers, public servants, FARC and civilian population), the deployment routes, deployments in the zones and the manipulation, storage, transportation and control of weapons, ammunition and explosives.

==== Decommissioning ====
The decommissioning of weapons is a "technical, traceable and verifiable procedure through which the UN receives all the weapons of the FARC to destine them to the construction of 3 monuments." The FARC's decommissioning would involve the following technical procedures: registration, identification, monitoring and verification of possession, collection, storage, disablement, removal and final disposition. In short, after the UN registers, identifies, and verifies possession of weapons, it would collect all of the FARC's weapons, store them in specific containers, remove them from the zone and dispose of them by building three monuments. All stages of the decommissioning process would be verified by the MM&V.

Five days after the formal signature of the final agreement, the FARC would provide the UN with the necessary information for the decommissioning. The FARC would contribute by different means, including the provision of information and the cleaning and decontamination of areas affected by landmines, improvised explosive devices, unexploded ordnances and explosive remnants of war.

The decommissioning would take place gradually over 6 months (180 days) from the formal signature of the final agreement ("D-day"). From the fifth to thirtieth day following D-day, the FARC would move to the ZVTN transporting all their individual and secondary weapons, militia armament, grenades and ammunition. The formal decommissioning of weapons would begin once all members of the FARC had reached the zones. The collection and storage of weapons would take place in three phases: 30% of weapons by D+90, an additional 30% of weapons by D+120 and the remaining 40% by D+150. By D+180 at the latest, or six months from the signature of the final agreement, the UN would have completed the process of extraction of weapons and would certify compliance of this process and duly inform public opinion. The bilateral ceasefire and the functioning the zones would end on D+180.

==== Reincorporation of the FARC ====
In addition to the measures to be adopted for the political reincorporation of the FARC (their transformation into a political party), the final agreement provides additional measures for their socioeconomic reincorporation. To promote a collective socioeconomic reincorporation, the FARC would create an organization called Economías Sociales del Común (ECOMÚN), in which membership would be voluntary. The government would assist ECOMÚN by funding its legal and technical advice and expediting its creation. In addition, the group of citizens who would promote the creation of the FARC's future political party or movement would create a non-profit centre of political thought and education which would advance social studies and research, and create political education programs. The government would also assist its creation by setting aside an annual sum of public money until 2022.

A National Reincorporation Council (Consejo Nacional de la Reincorporación, CNR) would be created, made up of 2 members of the government and 2 members of the FARC, with the objective of defining the activities, timeline and follow-up of the reincorporation process.

For the purposes of managing the reincorporation process, the FARC would, following its settlement in the aforementioned zones, provide the government with a complete list of all its members which would be revised and certified by the government in good faith. Once the FARC surrendered their weapon and expressed their commitment to comply with the agreement to reincorporate to civilian life, they would be accredited by the government.

The government would identify the necessities of the socioeconomic reincorporation process through a socioeconomic census, identify possible productive programs and projects for demobilized members of the FARC, and would create a one-time fund for the execution of such programs through ECOMÚN. In addition, for such purposes, each member of the FARC would have the right to a one-time economic support payment of 8 million pesos to undertake an individual or collective project.

All members of the FARC, for 24 months following the end of the decommissioning process in the zones, would receive a monthly payment equivalent to 90% of the legal monthly minimum wage, as long as they lacked another source of revenue. Afterwards, a monthly payment to be defined by law would be given to reincorporated members who chose to continue their studies. In addition to the above, at the end of the functioning of the zones, all members of the FARC would receive a one-time payment of 2 million pesos. The government would pay the social security contributions for those members lacking a source of revenue.

Various social programs – including formal education, vocational training, recognition of knowledge, housing, culture, sports, recreation, environmental protection, psycho-social attention, family reunification – would be identified and developed as necessary to help the reincorporation of the FARC.

==== Security guarantees ====
On June 23, the government and the FARC also announced a set of security guarantees to protect the security of all inhabitants, and specific measures for the protection of communities, social movements, political movements and the FARC's future political movement. In addition, the agreement includes the implementation of measures to intensify the effectiveness and comprehensiveness of the fight against criminal organizations which threaten the peace. Some of the main objectives of these security guarantees are respect, protection and promotion of human rights: ensuring the State's legitimate monopoly on the use of force throughout the territory and strengthening the administration of justice.

The main security guarantees and measures are as follows:

- A national political pact from the regions and with all political parties and movements, unions, civil society and all other major participants in the civic life of Colombia rejecting the use of arms in politics or the promotion of violent organizations like paramilitarism.
- A National Commission of Security Guarantees presided over by the president, which would have the goal of designing and monitoring public and criminal policy on the dismantlement of all criminal organizations and persecution of other criminal conducts threatening the peace agreement.
- A Special Investigation Unit within the Attorney General's office for the dismantlement of all criminal organizations and paramilitary successor organizations. It would investigate, prosecute, and indict criminal organizations responsible for homicides, massacres, gender violence, or attacks on social and political movements.
- Furthering the item on political participation, a Comprehensive Security System for political participation led by a high-level body and a technical committee, would implement a protection program to protect members of the new party or movement founded by the FARC but also other parties, social movement, community organizations and human rights advocates. For such purposes, a dedicated sub-unit of the National Protection Unit (which would include demobilized members of the FARC) and a security and protection body (with members of the FARC's political movement in liaison with the National Police), would be created.
- A Comprehensive Security and Protection Program for communities and organizations in the territories would adopt and define protection measures for organizations, groups and communities in the regions.
- An elite corps of the National Police to dismantle criminal organizations.
- Prevention and monitoring instrument of criminal organizations, a system of anticipation and prevention for rapid reaction.
- Anti-corruption measures, including policies to curb the penetration of the criminal organizations and behaviours.
- Security guarantees for judges, prosecutors and other public servants.
- A national mechanism to supervise and inspect regional private security companies and services.

== Measures for implementation ==
For the purposes of the implementation and verification of the final agreement (item 6 of the agenda), an Implementation, Monitoring, Verification and Dispute Resolution Commission of the Final Peace Agreement (Comisión de Implementación, Seguimiento y Verificación del Acuerdo Final de Paz y de Resolución de Diferencias, CSVR) would be created following the formal signature of the final agreement. It would be made up of three representatives of the government and three representatives of the FARC or its successor political party and would last until January 2019, at which time its members would decide on its continuation until 2026. During the 180-day ceasefire and decommissioning process, the CSVR would be accompanied by one delegate from each of the two guarantor countries (Cuba and Norway) and one delegate from each of the two accompanying countries (Venezuela and Chile).

The commission's objectives would be the resolution of differences, monitoring of the implementation of the final agreement, verification of compliance, monitoring of the legislative implementation of the agreement and reporting on the implementation. Mechanisms would allow for citizen participation in the process. The CSVR's various responsibilities would include:

- Adoption, within four months of its creation, of a framework plan for the implementation of the agreements. The plan would include all the objectives, goals, priorities, indicators, policy recommendations, and timeline for the implementation of the agreement. The plan would be valid for ten years, with a first implementation phase lasting until 2019, and it would be revised annually.
- Resolution of all disputes or unforeseen situations, in the absence of other dispute resolution mechanisms elsewhere in the agreement.
- Use as a space to manage any situations or differences arising after the signature of the final agreement, which does not involve the UN.
- Monitor all components of the final agreement and verify its implementation, notwithstanding the role of the MM&V.
- Propose drafts of bills or resolutions necessary for the implementation of the agreement.
- Organize thematic and territorial commissions.
- Produce periodic reports on the implementation of the agreement.
- Receive information and reports from other bodies charged with the implementation of the agreement such as civic organizations, universities, research centres, etc.

Additional measures to implement the agreements include:

- Legal revisions to ensure that departmental and municipal development plans include measures to guarantee implementation of the agreement.
- Use of central government funds and royalties to finance the implementation of the agreement.
- Promotion of the private sector's participation in the implementation of the agreement to ensure growth, stability, and the viability of the programs in the agreement.
- Stimulating the reception of international cooperation and aid funds.
- Promotion of social organizations' participation in the execution of the programs in the agreement.
- Creation of an integrated information system, to guarantee transparency in the implementation of the agreement. This system would include interactive online maps, regular accountability mechanisms, citizen oversight, transparency observatories, IT tools for the general public, mechanisms for citizens' complaints, and internal control mechanisms.

As agreed on May 11, 2016, the final agreement would be considered as a special agreement under the terms of common article 3 of the Geneva Conventions and registered, following its signature, before the Swiss Federal Council in Bern. Afterwards, the president would make a unilateral declaration in the name of the Colombian State before the Secretary General of the UN, relating the final agreement to Resolution 2261 of January 25, 2016.

The immediate priorities for the implementation of the agreement were as follows:

- An amnesty law and constitutional amendment for the JEP.
- Law approving the final agreement.
- Constitutional amendment incorporating the text of the final agreement to the Constitution.
- Constitutional and legal norms for the search unit for missing persons.
- Law for the special unit for the dismantlement of all criminal organizations.
- Law for special legal treatment for offences related to cultivation of illicit crops when the cultivators are not members of an armed group.
- Suspension of arrest warrants and extradition procedures against members of the FARC and accused collaborators.
- Constitutional and legislative amendments for guarantees and political participation of the FARC's new party.

Legislative Act 1 of 2016 amends the Constitution to create a special legislative procedure for the implementation of the agreement, for a six-month period renewable once. According to the special process:

- Bills and proposed constitutional amendments for the implementation of the agreement may only be initiated by the government.
- Bills and proposed constitutional amendments under the special legislative procedure would have priority over all other bills.
- The first debate on these bills would be held in a joint session of the permanent constitutional commissions of both houses. The second debate would be plenary debates on the floor of both houses.
- Bills would be approved with the majorities required by law or the Constitution.
- The legislative process would consist of only four debates, within eight days in both houses.
- Bills may only be modified with the government's approval to conform to the final agreement.
- Votes in commissions and plenaries would be on the entirety of the bills.
- Bills and proposed constitutional amendments would be subject to automatic judicial review, following their promulgation. Judicial review of constitutional amendments may only be for procedural defects.

In addition, the amendment gave the president special powers to issue legally binding decrees for the implementation of the agreement during a six-month period. These decrees were also subject to automatic judicial review. However, Legislative Act 1 of 2016 would only become valid following popular ratification of the final agreement in the plebiscite on October 2, 2016.

The CSVR would include a verification mechanism, with an international component. The verification mechanism would include two respected figures of international renown to be selected by the government and the FARC, and the international component would include a representative from each one of the guarantor and accompanying countries. It would also include a technical component, with the Kroc Institute for International Peace Studies at University of Notre Dame designing the methodology to identify advances in the implementation. The verification mechanism would objectively verify the state of the implementation of the agreement, identify delays or deficiencies, provide continuous support, and contribute to strengthening the agreement's implementation.

The government and the FARC would request from the United Nations the creation of a new political mission, following the end of the UN's mission as part of the MM&V. The second political mission would verify the FARC's reincorporation to civic life and the implementation of the security and protection measures. The UN's mission could last up to three years.

The international support for the implementation of the agreement was meant to strengthen guarantees for the implementation of the agreement and would bring experiences, resources, monitoring, and best practices to contribute to the implementation of the agreement. Some of the international organizations sought include the European Union, the Food and Agriculture Organization, Via Campesina, Union of South American Nations (UNASUR), Switzerland, the Dutch Institute for Multi-party Democracy, UNESCO, the United Nations Development Programme, the United Nations Office on Drugs and Crime, the United States of America, the Office of the United Nations High Commissioner for Human Rights, the Red Cross, the International Center for Transitional Justice, Sweden, and UN Women.

At least 500 social leaders have been killed between the signing of the agreement and April 2019. The former leader of the FARC, Rodrigo Londoño, claimed in an open letter to Colombian President Iván Duque in June 2019 that about 160 ex-fighters and their family members have been killed since the peace deal was signed.

== See also ==
- Decommissioning in Northern Ireland
