= Jaramillo =

Jaramillo may refer to:

== People ==
- Jaramillo (surname)

== Places ==
- Jaramillo, Chubut, Argentina
- Jaramillo, Santa Cruz, Argentina
- Jaramillo Creek, stream in New Mexico, United States
- Jaramillo de la Fuente, Spain
- Jaramillo Quemado, Spain
- Jaramillo, Chiriquí, Panama

== Events ==
- Jaramillo reversal of Earth magnetic field
