= Jaramillo (surname) =

Jaramillo is a family name of Spanish origin. It may refer to the following people:

- Annabelle Jaramillo, American politician
- Carlos Jaramillo (b. 1961), Colombian road cyclist
- Debbie Jaramillo (b. 1952), mayor of Santa Fe, New Mexico
- Elisa Bravo Jaramillo, shipwrecked in 1849 in Chile and rumoured to have been captured
- Fabio Jaramillo (b. 1967), Colombian road cyclist
- Ignacio Gómez Jaramillo (1910-1970), Colombian artist
- Jairo Jaramillo Monsalve (born 1940), Colombian Roman Catholic archbishop
- Jason Jaramillo (b. 1982), American baseball catcher
- Jesús Emilio Jaramillo Monsalve (1916–1989), Colombian Roman Catholic bishop
- Julio Jaramillo (1935–1978), Pasillo performer
- Leonardo Jaramillo, Spanish mannerist painter, active in the 17th-century in the Viceroyalty of Peru
- Liz Carolina Jaramillo (born 1981), Venezuelan politician
- Lucy Jaramillo (b. 1983), Ecuadorian hurdler
- Luis Jaramillo (footballer) (b. 1988), Panamanian football player
- Mari-Luci Jaramillo (1928–2019), U.S. ambassador to Honduras
- Mauricio Jaramillo, Former commander of FARC
- Paulina Jaramillo, Colombian-American engineer
- Rubén Jaramillo, Mexican revolutionary
- Rudy Jaramillo (b. 1950), hitting coach for the Texas Rangers (baseball)
- Stephanie Jaramillo (b. 1982), American boxer
- Virginia Jaramillo, Borough Mayor of Delegación Cuauhtémoc
