= Cathedral of Trujillo, Peru =

Cultural heritage site in Peru

Coordinates: 8°06′39″S 79°01′42″W

Cathedral of Trujillo
- Catedral de Trujillo (Spanish)
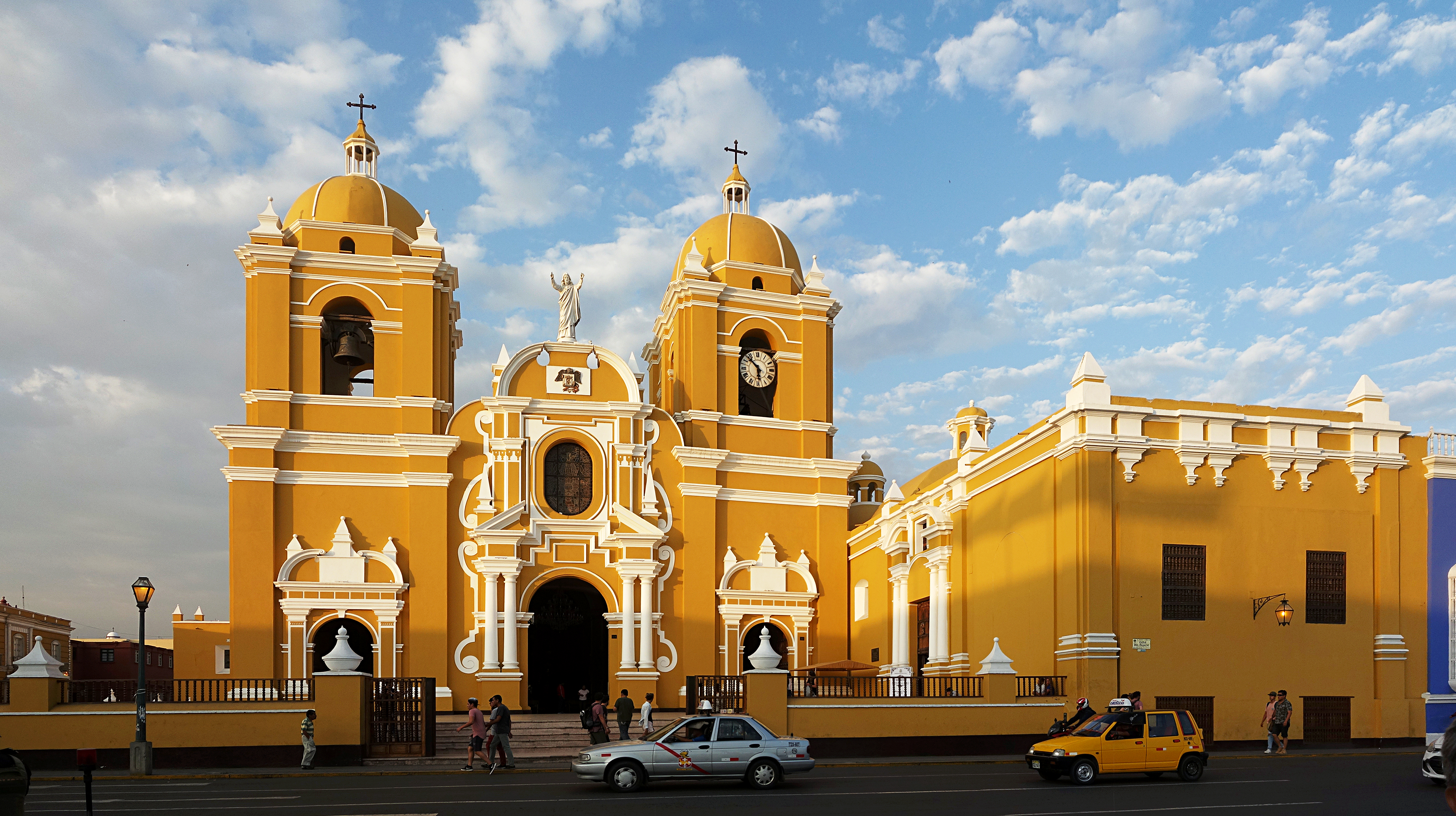
- Cathedral of Trujillo
- Location: Plaza de Armas, Trujillo
- Country: Peru
- Denomination: Catholic Church
- Sui iuris church: Latin Church

Architecture
- Architect: Lucas Poblete
- Groundbreaking: 1646
- Completed: 1666

Administration
- Archdiocese: Archdiocese of Trujillo

The Trujillo Cathedral (also known as the Cathedral Basilica of Santa María) is the cathedral and main church of Trujillo, Peru, located in the Plaza de Armas. Its construction took 19 years, from 1647 to 1666. In 1967, it was elevated to the category of "Minor Basilica" by Pope Paul VI.

== History ==
At first it was founded as a mother church, after the foundation of Trujillo (1535-1540), with modest architecture. In 1616, the church was elevated to the category of Cathedral by Pope Paul V; but unfortunately it was destroyed by the devastating earthquake of February 14, 1619, along with the city. The reconstruction was entrusted to Bartolomé de las Cuevas, and he also did not survive the earthquake of February 29, 1635. Consequently, as the episcopate needed a third, more consistent building, a large part of the work was built by the architect Francisco de Soto Ríos, from 1647, and then completed by Francisco Balboa in 1666.

Its interior is quite sober. It presents Rococo altarpieces painted white with gold and a Baroque one with the same colors; the canvases that he conserves belong to the Cusco school of painting. The "exempt" main altarpiece stands out, that is to say that it is not leaning on any wall. It is in the Churrigueresque baroque style and is covered in gold leaf. Only two of this type of altarpiece remain in Peru: the one in the Trujillo Cathedral and the one in the Cusco Cathedral.

The cathedral has beautiful paintings on its vault and in the dome; for this reason it is known as the Sistine Chapel or the Vatican of the Coast, in a similar way to how the Church of San Pedro de Andahuaylillas (Cusco) is known as the Sistine Chapel or the Vatican of the Andes.

It has the Cathedral Museum with religious works from the colonial era in gold and silver.

== Baroque music ==
The most notable maestro de capilla of Trujillo cathedral, from 1721 to 1728, was the composer Roque Ceruti, later maestro at Lima Cathedral.

Spanish painter Leonardo Jaramillo created the work Cristo de la columna (1643) which is located at this cathedral.
