= Juan Carlos Henao Pérez =

Colombian lawyer and jurist (1959–2024)

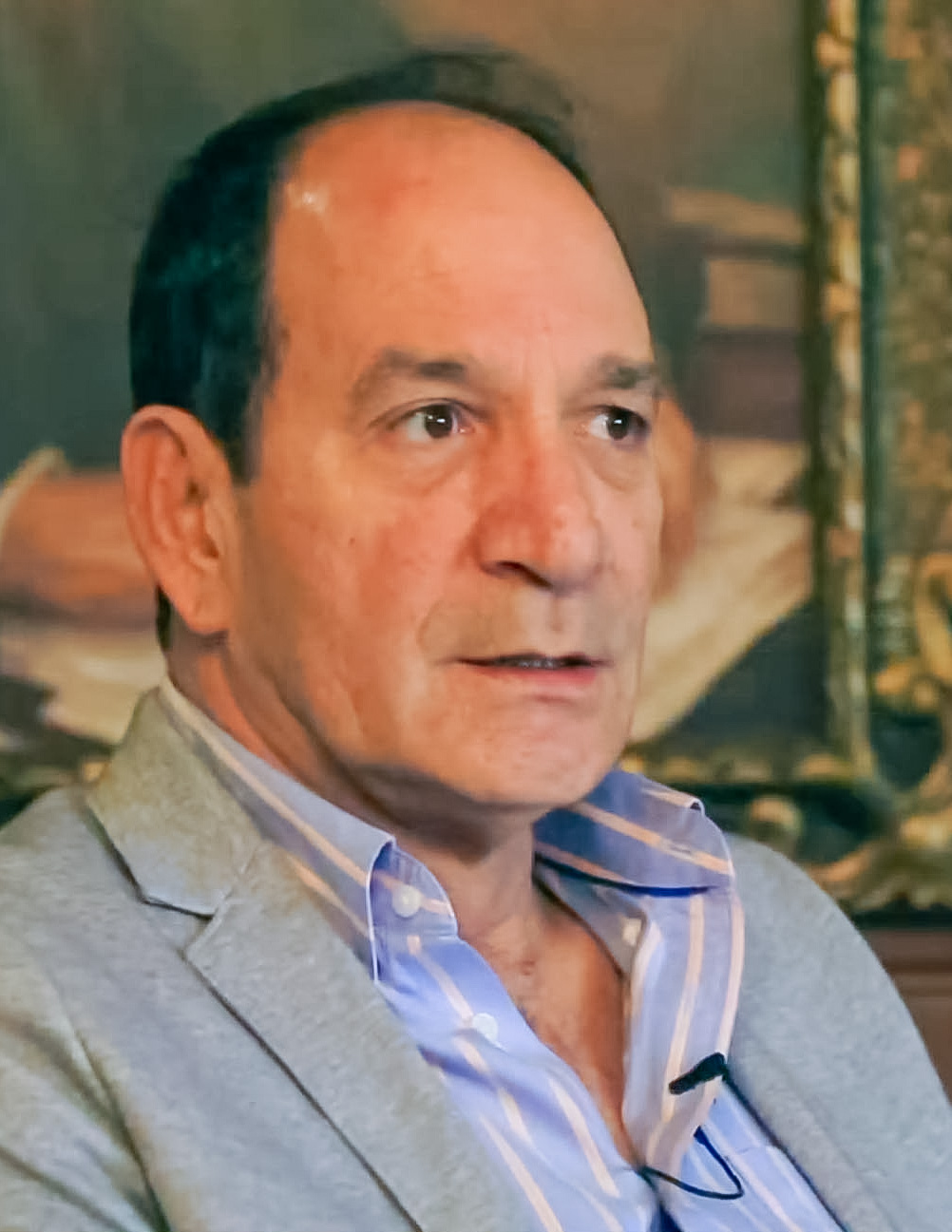
- Henao in 2019

President of the Constitutional Court of Colombia
- In office 2009–2010

Personal details
- Born: 6 December 1959 Cali, Colombia
- Died: 2 January 2024 (aged 64) Bogotá, Colombia
- Education: Externado University of Colombia; Paris-Panthéon-Assas University
- Occupation: Lawyer; Jurist

Juan Carlos Henao Pérez (6 December 1959 – 2 January 2024) was a Colombian lawyer and jurist. He served as president of the Constitutional Court from 2009 to 2010.

He was part of the team that reached the Colombian peace agreement. Henao died in Bogotá on 2 January 2024, at the age of 64.
