= Mauricio Jaramillo =

Colombian politician and ex-guerilla commander

Jaime Alberto Parra
- Born: 1952 (age 73–74); La Macarena, Meta; Colombia
- Military career
- Allegiance: Revolutionary Armed Forces of Colombia
- Rank: Secretariat member, Bloc commander
- Nicknames: 'El Médico' 'Wilson Valderrama Cano' 'Mauricio'
- Conflicts: Colombian conflict: Catatumbo campaign

Jaime Alberto Parra Rodríguez (Líbano, Tolima, 1952) was one of the FARC negotiators in the peace process with the government of Juan Manuel Santos, years before he replaced alias "Mono Jojoy" and Iván Ríos. in the Secretariat of the Revolutionary Armed Forces of Colombia (FARC) and currently participates in the Political Council of the Comunes party as an advisor for Solidarity, Human Rights and Prisoners.

Former commander of the Eastern Bloc and former member of the FARC-EP Secretariat, also known by the aliases of El Médico (The Medic), Jaramillo and Wilson Valderrama Cano, in 2012 he was in charge of negotiating the pre-agreement between this guerrilla group and the Colombian State during the government of Juan Manuel Santos, and subsequently became one of the negotiators and spokespersons in the dialogue. Since its creation in 2017, he has been a member of Fuerza Alternativa Revolucionaria del Común (FARC), a party founded in 2017 from the peace agreements between the government of Juan Manuel Santos and the FARC-EP in 2016.4

According to reports by Colombian authorities, Parra was responsible for the set up of medical facilities in the middle of jungle for the FARC, as well as setting up medical and sanitation training for FARC combatants. He was also the personal doctor of ailing FARC commander Manuel Marulanda.

According to reports by Colombian intelligence, Parra is considered to be a mobile guerrilla leader, without a base camp, moving continuously to visit the different guerrilla fronts. He participated in the guerrilla assaults on the towns of Mitú and Miraflores.

== Early years ==
According to a report by Colombian newspaper El Espectador, Parra graduated from the National University of Colombia in Medicine. Parra escalated through FARC ranks rapidly because of his professional background in medicine and became part of the higher command of the FARC, which is formed by some 30 top commanders including the seven members of the secretariat. In 1993 Parra was selected to be the possible successor of guerrilla leader Ivan Rios.

According to a report by Colombian daily El Tiempo, Parra might have studied medicine in Cuba, and also lived in Mexico for eight years along FARC "chancellor" Marcos Calarca.

== Negotiator in Havana ==
In 2012 he was sent as delegate for the realization of the pre-agreements of the negotiations in Havana, becoming one of the most important spokespersons of this organization during the peace process with the Colombian government, Parra acknowledged to the media that the kidnapping was a mistake of the FARC-EP.

== Political trajectory ==
Since the creation in 2017 of [./Https://es.wikipedia.org/wiki/Comunes_(Colombia) Fuerza Alternativa Revolucionaria del Común] (FARC) he has been a member of the new party occupying the number 7 position in the list of the 111 members of its national leadership. In his life as a politician he has not been visible, other than for his acknowledgements of war crimes such as the kidnapping of civilians, for which he has had to appear before the Special Jurisdiction for Peace (JEP), and of the practice of forced abortion of female guerrillas, of which he has been accused of being the major promoter.

Regarding this last accusation, the Corporación Rosa Blanca, created by girls and young women recruited by the FARC-EP, accuse him of being the main responsible for the thousands of abortions practiced by this guerrilla group.
