= Policarpa, Nariño =

Coordinates: 1°38′N 77°28′W

- Municipality and town
- Flag

- Location of the municipality and town of Policarpa, Nariño in the Nariño Department of Colombia.
- Country: Colombia
- Department: Nariño Department

Area
  - Total: 467 km^{2} (180 sq mi)

Population (Census 2018)
  - Total: 8,149
  - Density: 17.4/km^{2} (45.2/sq mi)
- Time zone: UTC-5 (Colombia Standard Time)

Policarpa is a town and municipality in the Nariño Department, Colombia. In August 2026 at least 13 people were killed by a landslide at an illegal gold mine in the area.
