= Jaramillo Creek =

Coordinates: 35.8548°N 106.4782°W

Jaramillo Creek is a 10 mile long stream in the US state of New Mexico with headwaters in the Jemez Mountains. Jaramillo is a tributary of the East Fork Jemez which is then a tributary of the Jemez River, a tributary of the Rio Grande. The creek is located in a graben in the Pleistocene age Valles Caldera. The Jaramillo normal event (1.06-0.9 Mya) of the Matuyama Reversed Epoch was named for rocks selected and aged at the type locality near the creek.

== See also ==
- List of rivers of New Mexico
