= Jaramillo Quemado =

Coordinates: 42°05′N 3°21′W

- Municipality and town
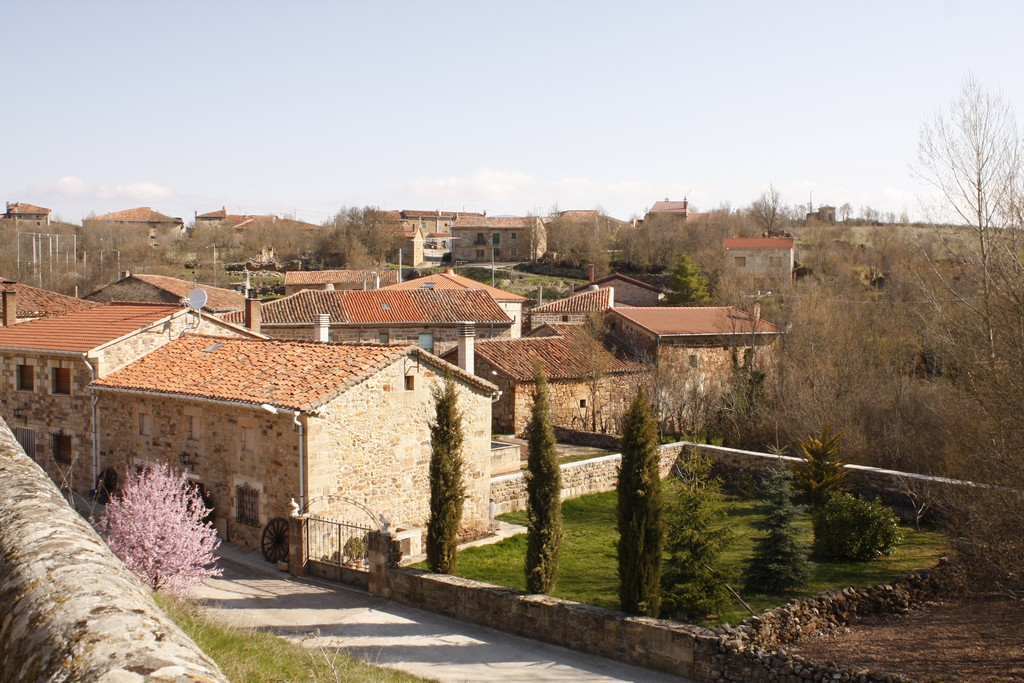
- View of Jaramillo Quemado, 2010
- Interactive map of Jaramillo Quemado
- Country: Spain
- Autonomous community: Castile and León
- Province: Burgos
- Comarca: Sierra de la Demanda

Area
  - Total: 17.45 km^{2} (6.74 sq mi)
- Elevation: 979 m (3,212 ft)

Population (2025-01-01)
  - Total: 12
  - Density: 0.69/km^{2} (1.8/sq mi)
- Time zone: UTC+1 (CET)
  - Summer (DST): UTC+2 (CEST)
- Postal code: 09640
- Website: http://www.jaramilloquemado.es/

Jaramillo Quemado is a municipality located in the province of Burgos, Castile and León, Spain. According to the 2011 census (INE), the municipality had a population of 5 inhabitants. It is the 2nd least populated municipality in Spain.

== History ==
Jaramillo Quemado received a fuero from Count Pedro González de Lara and Countess Eva in 1128. Although the original charter has been lost, a copy was made by Prudencio de Sandoval in the 17th century. It shows that the village owed the comparatively large annual sum of five silver solidi to the count for its privileges.
