= Paulina Jaramillo =

Colombian-American engineer

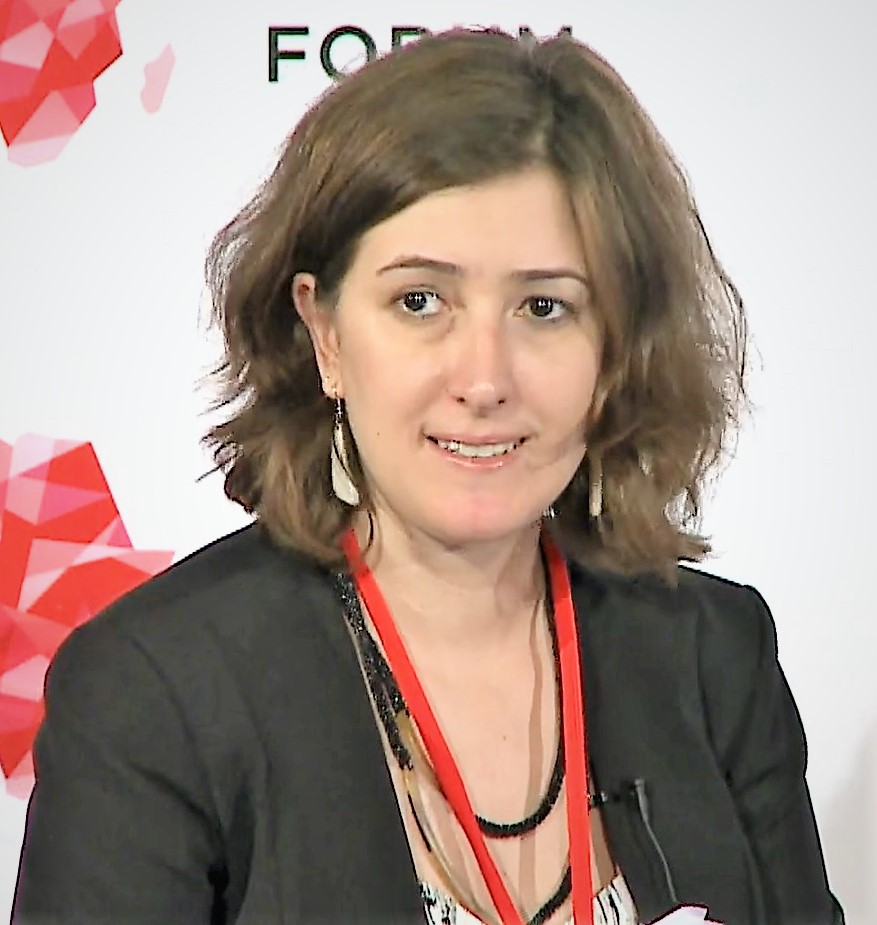
- Jaramillo at the Next Einstein Forum in 2018
- Born: Medellín
- Education: Florida International University; Carnegie Mellon University
- Scientific career
- Workplaces: Carnegie Mellon University
- Thesis: A life cycle comparison of coal and natural gas for electricity generation and the production of transportation fuels (2007)
- Website: https://orcid.org/0000-0002-4214-1106

Paulina Jaramillo is a Colombian-American engineer who is Professor of Engineering and Public Policy at Carnegie Mellon University (CMU). She serves as Director of the Green Design Institute. Her research focuses on energy system sustainability and climate change. She was selected as an Andrew Carnegie Fellow in 2020.

== Early life and education ==
Jaramillo is from originally from Medellín, Colombia. She was an undergraduate student at Florida International University, where she majored in Civil and Environmental Engineering. She completed her masters and doctoral degree in Civil and Environmental Engineering at Carnegie Mellon University, where she studied the life cycle of coal and natural gas for electricity generation.

== Research and career ==
Jaramillo's earliest research focused on using process-based life cycle assessment (LCA) to evaluate the climate impacts of coal and natural gas production and use in the USA. In 2007, she published one of the first papers to account for methane leakage in the life cycle climate impacts of natural gas. In 2010, Jaramillo joined the faculty at Carnegie Mellon University as the Executive Director of the RenewElec project, which focused on research to understand the barriers and opportunities for integrating variable and intermittent renewable resources in the US power system. Jaramillo has noted that through the RenewElec project, she learned that the technical and economic constraints under which the power system is operated could be key drivers of the environmental impacts of power generation. As a result, Jaramillo started working on consequential LCA research that integrates power system models into the LCA framework. Using this framework, Jaramillo and her research team have evaluated the climate impacts of electric vehicles, wind power, energy storage, and even Amazonian hydropower.

Jaramillo also works to understand the climate impacts on power systems. Between 2015 and 2020, she led an NSF-funded collaborative project with hydro-climatologists at the University of Washington and the Pacific Northwest National Lab to evaluate the climate impacts on the power system in the Southeastern United States. This project developed models to understand how climate change will affect demand for electricity and lead to new operating constraints at individual power plants. Furthermore, Jaramillo and her collaborators developed a power system model to integrate the new demand for electricity, power plant constraints, and hydro-climatology data to simulate the integrated operations of the power system under a broad set of climate change scenarios. This project also spun off research to evaluate the climate-induced risks to power generation in other regions of the world.

Since 2019, Jaramillo has co-led on the Open Energy Outlook (OEO) Initiative, a collaboration between CMU and North Carolina State University. Funded through a seed grant from the Sloan Foundation, the OEO initiative aims to bring energy modeling into the twenty-first century by applying the gold standards of policy-focused academic modeling, maximizing transparency, and building a networked community. The primary goal of this effort is to examine U.S. energy futures to inform future energy and climate policy efforts.

In 2014, Jaramillo transitioned some of her work to focus on energy and environmental issues in the Global South. With funding from the Rockefeller Foundation and in collaboration with researchers at the University of Massachusetts at Amherst, Columbia University, the Rochester Institute of Technology, and the Colorado School of Mines, Jaramillo helped establish the Electricity Growth and Use in Developing Economies (e-GUIDE) Initiative. This initiative seeks to transform the approaches used for planning and operations of electricity infrastructure in developing regions. Through this project, Jaramillo and her collaborators identified that the demand for electricity in rural communities is poorly understood and that energy system developers are observing unexpected trends in electricity demand. Jaramillo and her team are also evaluating opportunities for productive uses of electricity that support utility business models. Similarly, they have assessed options for "behind-the-meter" distributed energy systems to replace diesel generators prevalent in some Sub-Saharan African cities.

For the 2016-2017 academic year, Jaramillo lived in Kigali, Rwanda and worked at the CMU Africa campus. Jaramillo has suggested that witnessing first-hand the severity of air quality issues in the region, motivated her to analyze the linkage between unreliable electricity and emissions of local air pollutants in Sub-Saharan Africa. That work also inspired the creation of the Africa qualité de l'air (AfriqAir) network. In partnership with several international organizations (including local institutions), AfriqAir is a new hybrid air quality monitoring network with over 50 low-cost sensors and reference-grade monitors, mainly in urban areas across 11 African countries. The research objectives of this project include evaluation of sensor performance across the different climates in Africa, integration of ground sensor data with satellite data to expand spatial data coverage, verification of air quality models, and investigation of air pollution health effects. In 2020, Jaramillo and her AfriqAir collaborators published the first paper evaluating air quality in Kigali, Rwanda. Jaramillo and the AfriqAir team are now using the in-situ measurements from AfriqAir's hybrid sensor network, integrated with satellite-based measurements to deliver at-scale data products for air quality mapping. These methods and data can then be used for backcasting and forecasting air quality and performing source apportionment to identify specific sources of emissions.

In 2018, Jaramillo was selected to be a lead author for the report from Working Group III (WGIII) as part of the IPCC's 6th Assessment Report. WGIII is responsible for preparing the report about climate mitigation strategies, and Jaramillo was selected to co-author the chapter about mitigation in the Transportation Sector. In August 2021, Jaramillo was promoted to the role of Coordinating Lead Author for the chapter. The final draft of the report was submitted for government review on November 1, 2021 and the final report will be released on April 4, 2022.

In 2024 and 2025, Jaramillo worked as a AAAS Science & Technology Policy Fellow in the office of Congresswoman Teresa Leger Fernández. In the role, she helped introduce the Weather-Safe Energy Act to equip utilities with the cutting-edge weather data, modeling, and support they need to withstand the growing threat of extreme weather.

== Awards and honors ==
- 2019 College of Engineering Faculty Award
- 2019 Fenves Award for Systems Research
- 2020 Andrew Carnegie Fellow
