= Leonardo Jaramillo =

Spanish painter

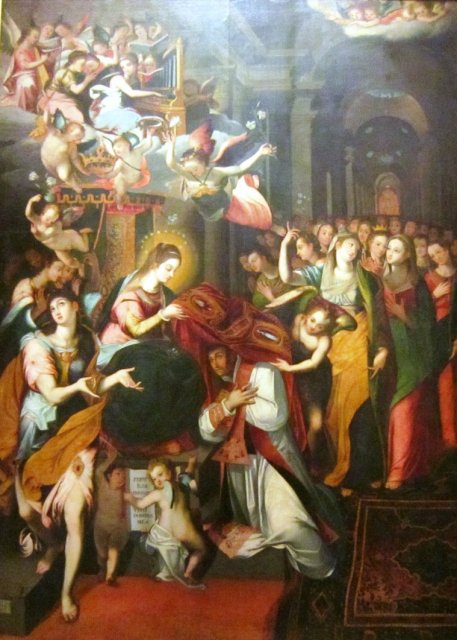
"Bestow of the Chasuble upon San Ildefonso" (1636), painted by Leonardo Jaramillo and located at Convento de los Descalzos, Lima, Peru

Leonardo Jaramillo was a Spanish mannerist painter, active in the 17th-century in the Viceroyalty of Peru (present-day Peru).

== Biography ==
Leonardo Jaramillo's birth date is unknown but he was probably born in Seville in the early 17th or late 16th century. He was likely trained or was influenced by Spanish painters Juan de las Roelas and Francisco Pacheco.

Between 1613 and 1615, he moved to the Viceroyalty of Peru. Jaramillo taught painting to students including Tomás Ortiz de Olivares, Juan de Sotomayor, and Miguel de Vargas. His most known work is "La imposición de la casulla a san Ildefonso" (English: Bestow of the Chasuble upon San Ildefonso) (1636).

== Notable works ==
- Nuestra Señora de la Piedad con donantes, Belén Church (Spanish: Iglesia Belén), Cajamarca, Peru.
- El milagro de las aguas (mural) (1635–1640), Basilica and Convent of San Francisco (Spanish: Basílica y convento de San Francisco de Lima), Lima, Peru
- San Francisco en la Porciúncula (mural) ( c. 1635–1640), Basilica and Convent of San Francisco (Spanish: Basílica y convento de San Francisco de Lima), Lima, Peru
- La imposición de la casulla a san Ildefonso (1636), Convento de los Descalzos, Lima, Peru
- Cristo de la columna (1643), Cathedral Basilica of St. Mary (Spanish: Catedral de Trujillo), Trujillo, Perú.
