= Marcos Calarcá =

Member of the Colombian Chamber of Representatives
- Incumbent
- Assumed office 20 July 2018
- Constituency: Valle del Cauca

Personal details
- Born: 16 August 1957 (age 68)
- Party: FARC
- Occupation: Politician

Luis Alberto Albán Burbano a.k.a. "Marcos Calarcá" or "Marco León Calarcá" is a Colombian former guerrilla member and spokesperson of the Revolutionary Armed Forces of Colombia (FARC). Calarca gained notoriety internationally when the Colombian government asked the Mexican government to shut down a legally authorized office of the FARC in Mexico City for their violent activities in Colombia and their support network in Mexico. Calarca was a spokesperson for the FARC in Mexico from 1993 until 2002. His wife (Amparo Victoria Torres) and two sons live in Canada. Amparo Victoria Torres is the sister of a.k.a. "Pablo Catatumbo," one of the members of the FARC Secretariat. Amparo is currently an artist.

== Arrest in Bolivia and extradition to Mexico ==
On Tuesday 24 March 1998 Calarca was arrested by in Bolivia by the Bolivian police at the airport of La Paz. Calarca was deported from Bolivia to Mexico since Colombia never requested his extradition.

== Kidnapping of foreigners in Colombia ==
In 1998 FARC kidnapped a number of foreigners including four American bird watchers. The FARC claimed that these four hostages were spies involved in counter-insurgency operations aiding the Colombian military. The United States denied this as well as then president of Colombia Ernesto Samper. Calarca mediated in the issue and was an active spokesperson for the FARC. All four Americans were eventually freed.

== Expelled from Mexico ==
Calarca and other members of the FARC left Mexico on 17 April 2002 with Cuba or Venezuela as presumed destinations.

== FARC-government peace process attempt ==
Calarca became part of the "thematic committee" during the FARC-Government peace process (1999-2002) along with other members of the FARC; Iván Ríos (coordinator), Mariana Páez, Domingo Biohó, Felipe Rincón, Julián Conrado, Gabriel Angel, Fidel Rondón, Bayron Yepes and Pedro Aldana.

== Wanted by Colombian authorities ==
The government of Colombia is offering a reward of COP$1500 million pesos for his capture or killing through the Interpol services.
