= List of presidents of the Senate of Colombia =

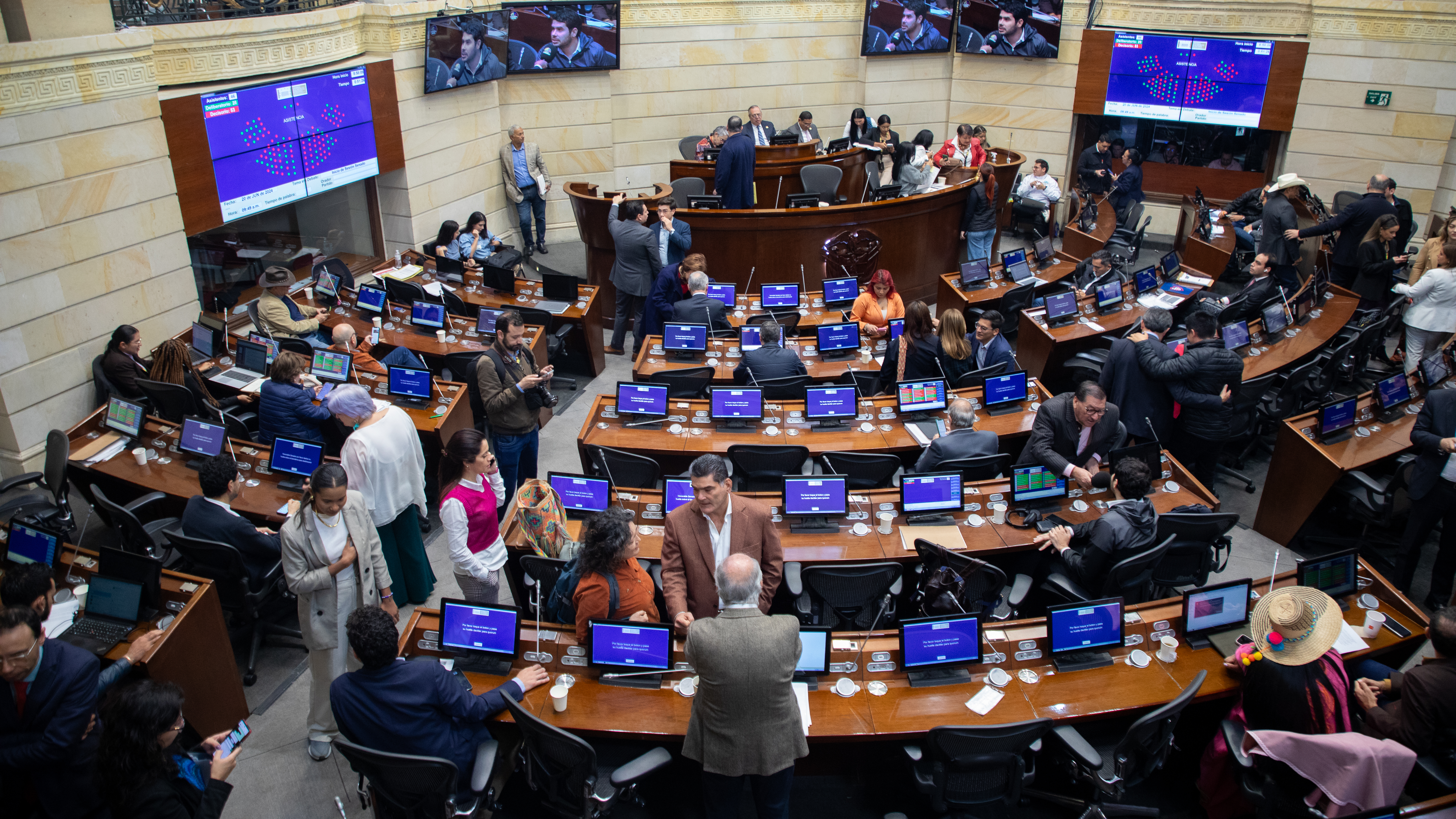
The Senate.

The President of the Senate it is the highest-ranking office in the Senate of Colombia and the third highest in political level, surpassed only by the Mayor of Bogotá. The President of the Senate is responsible for presiding over, organizing, and leading debates in the Senate. The Colombian legislature establishes that the four majorities in the Senate will have the right to a one-year presidency, beginning the first year of the four-year term with a member of the party or political coalition to which the president belongs and ending with a member of the majority opposition force in the last year of the corresponding term.

All Senate presidents have belonged to a political party or faction; only two have not completed their one-year presidential term, and three have served two terms respectively.

== Presidents of the Senate ==
Name	Territory	Party	Term	Congress
Manuel Mosquera		Conservative	July 20, 1966 – July 20, 1968	101st Congress
Mario Vivas		Liberal	July 20, 1968 – July 20, 1969	101st Congress
Julio César Turbay Ayala	Santa Fe de Bogotá	Liberal	July 20, 1969 – July 20, 1970	101st Congress
Eduardo Abuchaibe		Conservative	July 20, 1970 – July 20, 1972	101st Congress
Hugo Escobar		Conservative	July 20, 1972 – July 20, 1974	102nd Congress
Julio César Turbay Ayala	Santa Fe de Bogotá	Liberal	July 20, 1974 – July 20, 1975	102nd Congress
Gustavo Balcázar	Cauca Valley	Liberal	July 20, 1975 – July 20, 1976	102nd Congress
Edmundo López	Córdoba	Liberal	July 20, 1976 – July 20, 1977	102nd Congress
Gustavo Dajer	Sucre	Liberal	July 20, 1977 – July 20, 1978	103rd Congress
Bernardo Guerra	Antioquia	Liberal	July 20, 1978 – July 20, 1979	103rd Congress
Héctor Echeverri	Antioquia	Liberal	July 20, 1979 – July 20, 1980	103rd Congress
José Ignacio Díaz-Granados	Magdalena	Liberal	July 20, 1980 – July 20, 1981	103rd Congress
Gustavo Dajer	Sucre	Liberal	July 20, 1981 – July 20, 1982	104th Congress
Bernardo Guerra	Antioquia	Liberal	July 20, 1982 – July 20, 1983	104th Congress
Carlos Holguín Sardi	Cauca Valley	Conservative	July 20, 1983 – July 20, 1984	104th Congress
José Antonio Name	Atlántico	Liberal	July 20, 1984 – July 20, 1985	104th Congress
Álvaro Villegas Moreno	Antioquia	Conservative	July 20, 1985 – July 20, 1986	105th Congress (Note: After the abolition of the Constitution of 1886, the 105th legislature was the last.)
Humberto Peláez	Cauca	Liberal	July 20, 1986 – July 20, 1987	105th Congress
Arcízar López	Santa Fe de Bogotá	Liberal	July 20, 1987 – July 20, 1989	105th Congress
Luis Guillermo Giraldo	Caldas	Liberal	July 20, 1989 – July 20, 1990	105th Congress
Aurelio Iragorri	Cauca	Liberal	July 20, 1990 – July 20, 1991	1st Congress (Note: Following the adoption of the 1991 Constitution, the numbering of the legislature began to be counted from one.)
José Blackburn	Cauca	Liberal	July 20, 1992 – February 6, 1993	1st Congress
Tito Rueda	Bogotá, D.C.	Liberal	February 6 – July 20, 1993	1st Congress
Jorge Ramón Elías	Córdoba	Liberal	July 20, 1993 – July 20, 1994	1st Congress
Juan Guillermo Ángel	Risaralda	Liberal	July 20, 1994 – July 20, 1995	2nd Congress
Julio César Guerra	Sucre	Liberal	July 20, 1995 – July 20, 1996	2nd Congress
Luis Fernando Londoño	Bogotá, D.C.	Liberal	July 20, 1996 – July 20, 1997	2nd Congress
Almikar Acosta	La Guajira	Liberal	July 20, 1997 – July 20, 1998	2nd Congress
Fabio Valencia Cossio	Antioquia	Conservative	July 20, 1998 – July 20, 1999	3rd Congress
Miguel Pinedo Vidal	La Guajira	Liberal	July 20, 1999 – July 20, 2000	3rd Congress
Mario Uribe Escobar	Antioquia	Liberal	July 20, 2000 – July 20, 2001	3rd Congress
Carlos Armando García	Tolima	Liberal	July 20, 2001 – July 20, 2002	3rd Congress
Luis Alfredo Ramos Botero	Antioquia	Team Colombia	July 20, 2002 – July 20, 2003	4th Congress
Germán Vargas Lleras	Bogotá, D.C.	Radical Change	July 20, 2003 – July 20, 2004	4th Congress
Luis Humberto Gómez Gallo	Tolima	Conservative	July 20, 2004 – July 20, 2005	4th Congress
Claudia Blum	Cauca Valley	Radical Change	July 20, 2005 – July 20, 2006	4th Congress
Dilian Francisca Toro	Cauca Valley	Unionist	July 20, 2006 – July 20, 2007	5th Congress
Nancy Patricia Gutiérrez	Cundinamarca	Radical Change	July 20, 2007 – July 20, 2008	5th Congress
Hernán Francisco Andrade	Huila	Conservative	July 20, 2008 – July 20, 2009	5th Congress
Javier Enrique Cáceres	Bolívar	Radical Change	July 20, 2009 – July 20, 2010	5th Congress
Armando Benedetti	Atlántico	Unionist	July 20, 2010 – July 20, 2011	6th Congress
Juan Manuel Corzo	North Santander	Conservative	July 20, 2011 – July 20, 2012	6th Congress
Roy Barreras	Cauca Valley	Unionist	July 20, 2012 – July 20, 2013	6th Congress
Juan Fernando Cristo	North Santander	Liberal	July 20, 2013 – July 20, 2014	6th Congress
José David Name	Atlántico	Unionist	July 20, 2014 – July 20, 2015	7th Congress
Luis Fernando Velasco	Cauca	Liberal	July 20, 2015 – July 20, 2016	7th Congress
Mauricio Lizcano	Antioquia	Unionist	July 20, 2016 – July 20, 2017	7th Congress
Efraín Cepeda	Atlántico	Conservative	July 20, 2017 – July 20, 2018	7th Congress
Ernesto Macías Tovar	Huila	Democratic Center	July 20, 2018 – July 20, 2019	8th Congress
Lidio García	Bolívar	Liberal	July 20, 2019 – July 20, 2020	8th Congress
Arturo Char	Atlántico	Radical Change	July 20, 2020 – July 20, 2021	8th Congress
Juan Diego Gómez	Bolívar	Conservative	July 20, 2021 – July 20, 2022	8th Congress
Roy Barreras	Cauca Valley	Broad Democratic Alliance	July 20, 2022 – May 4, 2023 (Note: On May 4, 2023, the Council of State annulled his election as Senator, resulting in his removal from the position of president of the Senate.)	9th Congress
Alexander López Maya	Cauca Valley	Alternative Democratic Pole	June 6, 2023 – July 20, 2023 (Note: Following the dismissal of Roy Barreras was elected as his replacement, serving as president of the Senate for only twenty-five days.)	9th Congress
Iván Name	Atlántico	Green Alliance	July 20, 2023 – July 20, 2024	9th Congress
Efraín Cepeda	Atlántico	Conservative	July 20, 2024 – July 20, 2025	9th Congress
Lidio García	Bolívar	Liberal	July 20, 2025 – July 20, 2026	9th Congress
Honorio Henríquez	Magdalena	Democratic Center	July 20, 2026 – Incumbent	10th Congress

== See also ==
- List of presidents of the Chamber of Representatives of Colombia
- List of vice presidents of Colombia
- List of presidents of Colombia
- List of viceroys of New Granada
