= 9th Congress of Colombia =

←	8th	10th	→
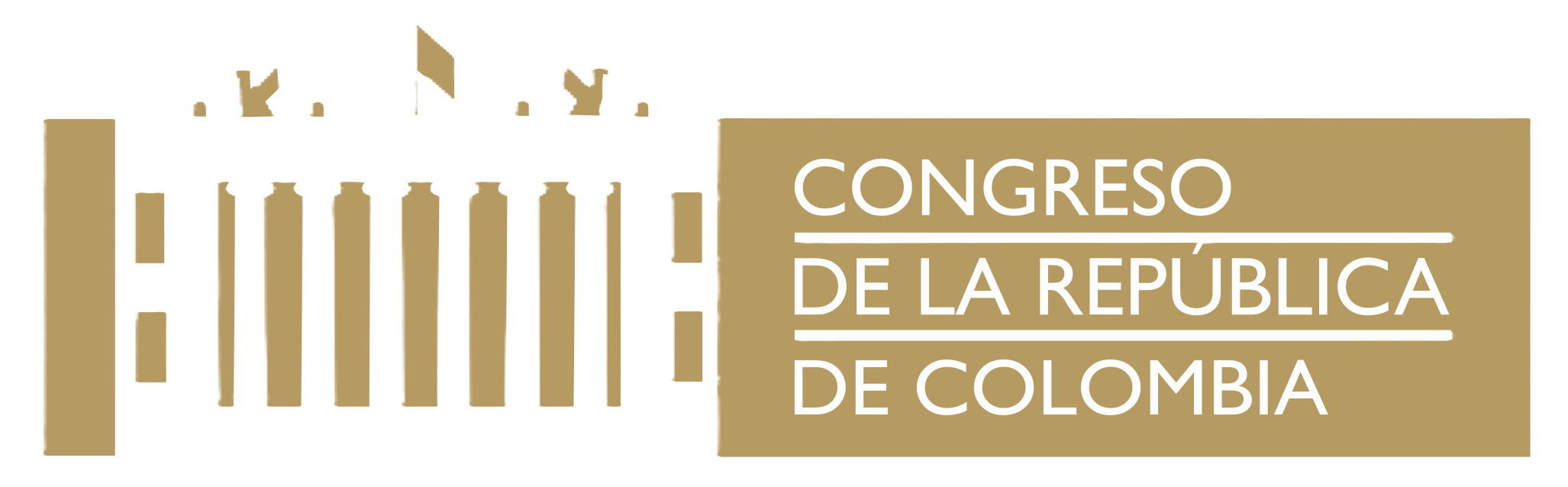

Overview
- Term: July 20, 2022 – July 20, 2026

Senate

Chamber of Representatives

The Ninth Congress of the Republic of Colombia was the convocation of the legislative branch of the Republic of Colombia in Bogotá from 20 July 2022 to 20 July 2026, composed of the Senate of Colombia and the Chamber of Representatives of Colombia. In total, it was made up of 108 Senators and 187 Representatives.

Article 114 of the Colombian Constitution of 1991 proclaims Congress as the highest representative body of the legislative power. According to article 114, it is up to the Congress of the Republic of Colombia to reform the Constitution, make laws and exercise political control over the government and administration. Currently, the "Legislative Observatory" of the National University of Colombia and the "Visible Congress" program of the University of the Andes monitor the Congress of the Republic.

== 2022 parliamentary election ==
The 2022 Colombian parliamentary election were held on Sunday, 13 March 2022, where the 289 representatives of the House of Representatives and members of the Senate were elected.

== Leadership ==
=== Senate leadership ===
==== Presiding ====
- President of the Senate: Efraín Cepeda (C), until July 20, 2025
- First Vice President of the Senate: Jhon Jairo Roldán (L), until July 20, 2025
- Second Vice President of the Senate: Alirio Barrera (DC), until July 20, 2025

==== Presiding (2022-2023) ====
- President of the Senate: Roy Barreras (PH), since July 20, 2022 until May 4, 2023
- President of the Senate: Alexander López Maya (PH), since June 6, 2023 until July 20, 2023
- First Vice President of the Senate: Miguel Ángel Pinto (L), since July 20, 2022 until July 20, 2023
  (as acting president: May 4 - June 6, 2023)
- Second Vice President of the Senate: Honorio Henríquez (CD), since July 20, 2022 until July 20, 2023

==== Presiding (2023-2024) ====
- President of the Senate: Iván Name (GA), since July 20, 2024 until July 20, 2024
- First Vice President of the Senate: María José Pizarro (PH), since July 20, 2023 until July 20, 2024
- Second Vice President of the Senate: Didier Lobo Chinchilla (CR), since July 20, 2023 until July 20, 2024

== Senate ==
=== Seats by political party ===
The 108 Senators were distributed by party as follows:

Senate of Colombia
Party or movement	Total votes	%	Seats
National constituency
Historic Pact	2,800,730	17.35	20
Conservative Party	2,223,061	14.18	15
Liberal Party	2,100,083	13.39	14
Hope Center Coalition/ Green Alliance	1,954,792	12.28	13
Centro Democrático	1,917,153	12.08	13
Partido Cambio Radical	1,610,651	10.22	11
Partido de la U	1,508,031	9.63	10
Commons	24,862	0.19	5
MIRA / Colombia Justa Libres	578,195	3.64	4
Indigenous constituency
Movimiento Alternativo Indígena Social	85,795	25.09	1
Indigenous Authorities of Colombia	61,913	18.10	1
Opposition Statute
Second place presidential election			1
Total seats			108
Source: Consejo Nacional Electoral

Senators are elected in a national constituency. The upper house is made up of 108 senators, of which 5 belong to the seats agreed upon in Havana, 2 seats to the special indigenous constituency and one seat for the presidential candidate of the formula that came second in the 2022 Colombian presidential election.

The senators are distributed by mutual agreement in 7 commissions; First Commission that is in charge of constitutional issues, Second Commission of international politics and public force, Third Commission of finance and public credit, Fourth of budget and fiscal control, Fifth of agrarian and environmental sector; Sixth of communications, public services and calamities and Seventh of labor issues.

The order of the following list obeys, if it is an open list, the vote obtained by each senator within his party and in the case of the closed list, the order in which they were ordered by the coalition or party.

== Chamber of Representatives ==
The 187 members of the Chamber of Representatives were distributed by party as follows:

=== Representatives of the Chamber ===
After the 2022 Colombian parliamentary election, the Colombian Chamber of Representatives was made up of 187 legislators: 165 elected by regional constituencies (32 departments, Capital District and special constituencies of Colombians residing abroad, Afro-Colombians and indigenous communities), 5 belonging to the seats agreed upon in Havana, 16 belonging to the Special Transitory Circumscriptions of Peace, and one seat for the vice-presidential candidate of the formula that comes second in the Colombian presidential elections of 2022:

▌ Liberal ▌ Historic Pact ▌ Conservative ▌ Union Party for the People ▌ Green Alliance ▌ Commons

=== Amazonas ===
▌ Mónica Bocanegra (L)
▌ Yenica Acosta (CD)

=== Antioquia ===
▌ María Eugenia Lopera (L)
▌ Julian Peinado (L)
▌ Luis Carlos Ochoa (L)
▌ David Alejandro Toro (PH)
▌ Susana Gómez Castaño (PH)
▌ Luz María Múnera (PH)
▌ Daniel Restrepo (C)
▌ Andrés Felipe Jimenez (C)
▌ Luis Miguel Lopéz (C)
▌ Hernán Cadavid (CD)
▌ Yulieth Sánchez (CD)
▌ Óscar Darío Pérez (CD)
▌ Juan Fernando Espinal (CD)
▌ Elkin Opina (PV)
▌ Juan Camilo Londoño (PV)
▌ Pedro García (FP)

=== Arauca ===
▌ German Rozo (L)
▌ Lina María Garrido (CR)

=== Atlantico ===
▌ Jezmi Barraza (L)
▌ Dolcey Torres (L)
▌ Agmeth Escaf (PH)
▌ Antonio Zabaraín D'Arce (C)
▌ Gersel Pérez (CR)
▌ Modesto Enrique Aguilera (CR)
▌ Betsy Pérez Arango (CR)
▌ Germán Gómez López (PF)

=== Bolívar ===
▌ Silvio Carrasquilla (L)
▌ Dorina Hernández (PH)
▌ Yamil Arana (C)
▌ Juana Aray Franco (C)
▌ Andrés Montes (C)
▌ Fernando Niño Mendoza (C)

=== Boyacá ===
▌ Hector David Chaparro (C)
▌ Pedro José Suárez Vacca (PH)
▌ Íngrid Sogamoso (C)
▌ Eduard Triana Rincón (DC)
▌ Wilmer Castellanos (G)
▌ Jaime Salamanca (G)

Department	Representative	Party or coalition		Notes
Amazonas	Mónica Karina Bocanegra Pantoja	Liberal Party	1	
Antioquia	María Eugenia Lopera Monsalve	Liberal Party	2	
Antioquia	Julián Peinado Ramírez	Liberal Party	3	
Antioquia	Luis Carlos Ochoa Tobón	Liberal Party	4	
Arauca	Germán Rogelio Rozo Anis	Liberal Party	5	
Atlántico	Jezmi Lizeth Barraza Arraut	Liberal Party	6	
Atlántico	Dolcey Óscar Torres Romero	Liberal Party	7	
Bogotá	Juan Carlos Lozada Vargas	Liberal Party	8	
Bolívar	Silvio José Carrasquilla Torres	Liberal Party	9	
Boyacá	Héctor David Chaparro Chaparro	Liberal Party	10	
Caldas	José Octavio Cardona León	Liberal Party	11	
Caquetá	Gilma Díaz Arias	Liberal Party	12	
Casanare	Hugo Alfonso Archila Suárez	Liberal Party	13	
Cauca	Cesar Cristian Gómez Castro	Liberal Party	14	
Chocó	Jhoany Carlos Alberto Palacios Mosquera	Liberal Party	15	
Córdoba	Andrés David Calle Aguas	Liberal Party	16	
Cundinamarca	Óscar Hernán Sánchez León	Liberal Party	17	
Guaviare	Alexander Harley Bermúdez Lasso	Liberal Party	18	
Huila	Flora Perdomo Andrade	Liberal Party	19	
Magdalena	Kelyn Johana González Duarte	Liberal Party	20	
Norte de Santander	Wilmer Yesid Guerrero Avendaño	Liberal Party	21	
Putumayo	Carlos Adolfo Ardila Espinosa	Liberal Party	22	
Quindío	Piedad Correal Rubiano	Liberal Party	23	
Quindío	Sandra Bibiana Aristizábal Saleg	Liberal Party	24	
Risaralda	Diego Patiño Amariles	Liberal Party	25	
Risaralda	Aníbal Gustavo Hoyos Franco	Liberal Party	26	
San Andrés and Providencia	Elizabeth Jay-Pang Díaz	Liberal Party	27	
Santander	Álvaro Leonel Rueda Caballero	Liberal Party	28	
Sucre	Karyme Adrana Cotes Martínez	Liberal Party	29	
Tolima	Olga Beatriz González Correa	Liberal Party	30	
Valle del Cauca	Álvaro Henry Monedero Rivera	Liberal Party	31	
Valle del Cauca	Leonardo de Jesús Gallego Arroyave	Liberal Party	32	
Antioquia	David Alejandro Toro Ramírez	Historic Pact	1	
Antioquia	Susana Gómez Castaño	Historic Pact	2	
Antioquia	Luz María Múnera	Historic Pact	3	
Atlántico	Agmeth José Escaf Tijerino	Historic Pact	4	
Bogotá	David Ricardo Racero Mayorca	Historic Pact	5	President of the Chamber from 2022 to 2023
Bogotá	María Fernanda Carrascal	Historic Pact	6	
Bogotá	Gabriel Becerra Yáñez	Historic Pact	7	
Bogotá	Etna Támara Argote Calderón	Historic Pact	8	
Bogotá	Alirio Uribe Muñoz	Historic Pact	9	
Bogotá	María del Mar Pizarro	Historic Pact	10	
Bogotá	Heráclito Landinez Suárez	Historic Pact	11	
Bolívar	Dorina Hernández Palomino	Historic Pact (SPS)	12	
Boyacá	Pedro José Suárez Vacca	Historic Pact	13	
Cauca	Jorge Hernán Bastidas Rosero	Historic Pact	14	
Cauca	Ermes Evelio Pete Vivas	Historic Pact	15	
Cundinamarca	Eduard Giovanny Sarmiento Hidalgo	Historic Pact	16	
Cundinamarca	Leider Alexandra Vásquez Ochoa	Historic Pact	17	
Exterior	Carmen Felisa Ramírez Boscán	Historic Pact (CH)	18	
Huila	Leyla Marleny Rincón Trujillo	Historic Pact	19	
Meta	Gabriel Ernesto Parrado Durán	Historic Pact	20	
Nariño	Erick Adrián Velasco Burbano	Historic Pact	21	
Putumayo	Jorge Andrés Cancimance López	Historic Pact (CH)	22	
Santander	Mary Anne Andrea Perdomo Gutiérrez	Historic Pact	23	
Valle del Cauca	José Alberto Tejada Echeverri	Historic Pact	24	
Valle del Cauca	Gloria Elena Arizabaleta Corral	Historic Pact	25	
Valle del Cauca	Cristóbal Caicedo Angulo	Historic Pact	26	
Valle del Cauca	Jorge Alejandro Ocampo Giraldo	Historic Pact	27	
Valle del Cauca	Alfredo Mondragón Garzón	Historic Pact	28	
