= Angelino Garzón =

Vice President of Colombia from 2010 to 2014

His Excellency Angelino Garzón
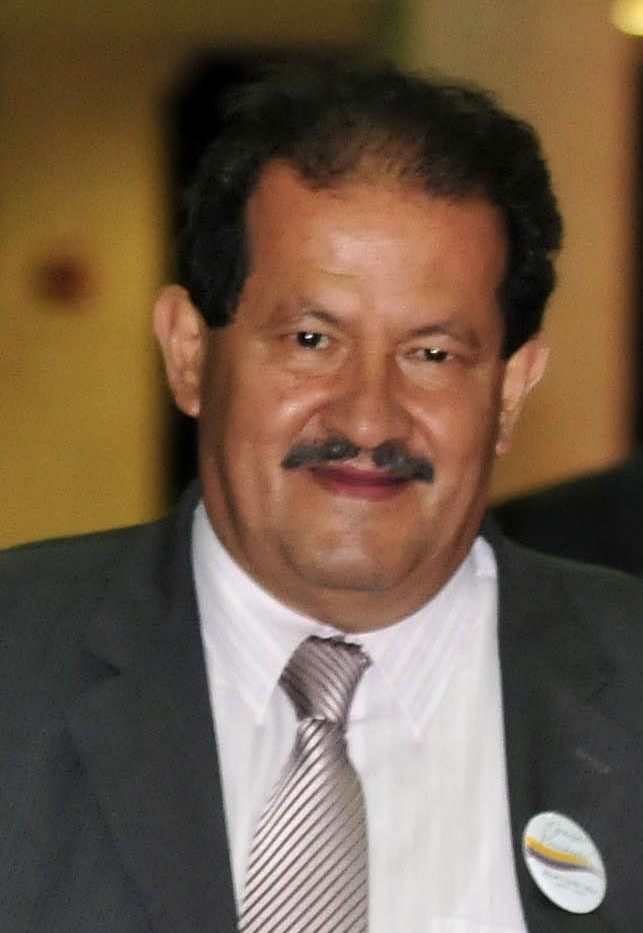

9th Vice President of Colombia
- In office 7 August 2010 – 7 August 2014
- President: Juan Manuel Santos
- Preceded by: Francisco Santos Calderón
- Succeeded by: Germán Vargas Lleras

Permanent Representative of Colombia to the United Nations Office at Geneva
- In office 29 January 2009 – 9 June 2010
- President: Álvaro Uribe
- Preceded by: Clemencia Forero
- Succeeded by: Alicia Arango

69th Governor of Valle del Cauca
- In office 1 January 2004 – 1 January 2008
- Preceded by: Germán Villegas
- Succeeded by: Juan Carlos Abadía

Minister of Labour and Social Protection
- In office 18 July 2000 – 7 August 2002
- President: Andrés Pastrana
- Preceded by: Gina Riaño Barón
- Succeeded by: Juan Luis Londoño

Personal details
- Born: Angelino Garzón Quintero; 29 October 1946 (age 79) Buga, Cauca Valley, Colombia
- Party: Social Party of National Unity
- Other political affiliations: Patriotic Union
- Spouse: Monserrat Muñoz Pipin (m. 1979)
- Children: 2
- Education: Jorge Tadeo Lozano University

Angelino Garzón Quintero (born 29 October 1946) is a Colombian politician who served as Vice President of Colombia, under President Juan Manuel Santos. He was the 69th Governor of Valle del Cauca from 2004 to 2008, and served as the second Minister of Labour and Social Protection under the administration of President Andrés Pastrana Arango. He was Permanent Representative of Colombia to the United Nations Office at Geneva from 29 January 2009 until his resignation in March 2010, in preparation for his election to the Vice Presidency.

== Career ==
He has been a union leader for many labor union and in many positions among these General Secretary of the Central Union of Workers (Spanish: Central Unitaria de Trabajadores, CUT) between 1981 and 1990. He later ran for congressman and was elected to become part of the Constituent Assembly of Colombia that created the Colombian Constitution of 1991. He also served as Vice President of the Patriotic Union Party.

During the government of President Andrés Pastrana Arango Garzon was appointed Ministry of Labour and Social Protection from 2000 until 2002. He was one of the ministers of Pastrana's administration with a popular positive image. After serving as minister he was proposed running for president but he declined. Garzon then participated as member of the facilitating Commission for the Humanitarian Accord with the Revolutionary Armed Forces of Colombia guerrilla group (FARC).

He then resigned from the commission to postulate his name for Governor of Valle del Cauca Department. He was elected in 2003 with 60.69% of the votes and winning over Carlos Holmes Trujillo and Carlos José Holguín, this last candidate son of former senator Carlos Holguín Sardi.

During his administration as Governor of Valle del Cauca in 2006, he was criticized for a conflict that surged between a CISA S.A. Constructing Consortium in charge of widening and repairing the highway Cali–Candelaria but which was never started and CISA S.A. sued the Valle del Cauca Department. Garzon and his cabinet called for a hunger strike to press for the courts for an outcome favorable for the department.

In June 2007 Garzon accompanied President Álvaro Uribe Vélez as part of the presidential delegation that traveled to Washington, D.C. pursuing the approval by the United States Congress of the Colombia Trade Promotion Agreement between Colombia and the United States. Senador Jorge Enrique Robledo of the Alternative Democratic Pole party and one of the strongest critics of the trade agreement criticized Garzon and mentioned that Garzon had never been part of the Alternative Democratic Pole party nor he had been affiliated to the parties that formed the alliance Independent Democratic Pole or Democratic Alternative.

In 2014, Garzón was offered the post of Ambassador to Brazil, but rejected it on the grounds that his German Shepherd dog would not be able to adapt to the Brazilian climate.

== Cancer ==
Around October 2012, he was diagnosed with prostate cancer.

Political offices
Preceded by Francisco Santos Calderón	Vice President of Colombia; 2010-2014	Succeeded by Germán Vargas Lleras
Preceded by Clemencia Forero	Permanent Representative of Colombia to the United Nations Office at Geneva; 2009-2010	Succeeded by Alicia Arango
Preceded by Germán Villegas	Governor of Valle del Cauca; 2004-2008	Succeeded by Juan Carlos Abadía
Preceded by Gina Riaño Barón	Minister of Health and Social Protection; 2000-2002	Succeeded by Juan Luis Londoño
Order of precedence
Preceded by Francisco Santos Calderón as former vice president	Order of precedence of Colombia former vice president	Succeeded by Germán Vargas Lleras as former vice president
