= List of governors of Valle del Cauca Department =

This is a list of governors of the Department of Valle del Cauca from its creation by decree number 340 of April 16, 1910. The current Governor of Valle del Cauca is Dilian Francisca Toro.

== Governors ==
Order	Governor	Term start	Term end
1	Pablo Borrero Ayerbe	May 1, 1910	January 10, 1912
2	Miguel García Sierra	January 14, 1912	September 19, 1914
3	José Antonio Pinto	September 9, 1914	July 3, 1915
4	Miguel Ángel Lozada	June 4, 1915	June 30, 1915
5	Vicente García Córdoba	June 1, 1915	September 18, 1918
6	Ignacio Réngifo Borrero	September 19, 1918	November 3, 1922
7	José Ignacio Vernaza	November 4, 1922	September 15, 1924
8	Pedro Antonio Molina	September 15, 1924	October 20, 1924
8	Manuel Antonio Carvajal	October 20, 1924	March 24, 1927
9	Gonzalo Lozano Lozano	March 28, 1927	June 3, 1927
10	Rodrigo Hernán Lloreda Caicedo	June 4, 1927	February 28, 1929
11	Tulio Raffo	March 1, 1929	August 27, 1930
12	Salvador Iglesias	August 30, 1930	January 20, 1932
13	Valentín Ossa	January 21, 1932	May 22, 1933
14	Adán Uribe Restrepo	May 24, 1933	November 15, 1933
15	Luis Felipe Rosales	November 16, 1933	August 28, 1934
16	Ernesto González Piedrahita	August 29, 1934	November 11, 1935
17	Tulio Enrique Tascón	November 12, 1935	August 3, 1938
18	Demetrio García Vásquez	August 16, 1938	March 7, 1940
19	Alonso Aragón Quintero	March 11, 1940	August 17, 1942
20	Mariano Ramos Restrepo	August 18, 1942	March 30, 1944
22	Absalón Fernández de Soto	April 3, 1944	April 28, 1945
23	Saúl Saavedra Lozano	April 30, 1945	May 16, 1945
24	Carlos Navia Belalcázar	May 17, 1945	August 13, 1946
25	Ismael Hormaza Córdoba	August 16, 1946	November 8, 1946
26	Francisco Tamayo	November 13, 1946	January 11, 1947
27	Absalón Fernández de Soto	January 15, 1947	June 18, 1947
28	Oscar Colmenares Camacho	July 21, 1947	April 21, 1948
29	Francisco Eladio Ramírez	April 26, 1948	April 13, 1949
30	Saúl Saavedra Lozano	April 18, 1949	May 24, 1949
31	Vicente García Córdoba	May 27, 1949	October 6, 1949
32	Nicolás Borrero Olano	October 8, 1949	May 12, 1950
33	Antonio Lizarazo Bohórquez	May 13, 1950	August 30, 1951
34	Carlos A. Sardi Garcés	September 1, 1951	June 9, 1953
35	Jesús María Murgueitio	June 10, 1953	June 22, 1953
36	Diego Garcés Giraldo	June 22, 1953	October 30, 1955
37	Alberto Gómez Arenas	October 31, 1955	February 16, 1957
38	Carlos A. Lombana Cuervo	February 16, 1957	April 16, 1957
39	Jaime Polanía Puyo	April 16, 1957	May 10, 1957
40	Carlos A. Lombana Cuervo	May 11, 1957	May 19, 1957
41	Alberto Gómez Arenas	May 20, 1957	July 6, 1957
42	Jacinto Efraín Márquez	July 6, 1957	August 19, 1957
43	Enrique Micolta C.	August 20, 1957	October 5, 1957
44	Oscar Herrera Roboyedo	October 5, 1957	August 25, 1958
45	Absalón Fernández de Soto	August 25, 1958	October 16, 1959
46	Alonso Aragón Quintero	October 16, 1959	October 14, 1961
47	Carlos Humberto Morales	October 14, 1961	September 8, 1962
48	Gustavo Balcázar Monzón	September 8, 1962	October 17, 1964
49	Humberto González Narváez	October 17, 1964	August 19, 1966
50	Libardo lozano Guerrero	August 20, 1966	September 15, 1968
51	Rodrigo Lloreda Caicedo	September 16, 1968	August 18, 1970
52	Marino Réngifo Salcedo	August 18, 1970	August 22, 1974
53	Raúl Orejuela Bueno	August 23, 1974	September 6, 1976
54	Carlos Holguín Sardi	September 6, 1976	September 1, 1978
55	Jaime Arizabaleta Calderón	September 1, 1978	September 11, 1980
56	Luis Fernando Londoño Capurro	September 12, 1980	March 10, 1981
57	Humberto González Narváez	March 23, 1981	August 30, 1982
58	Doris Eder de Zambrano	August 31, 1982	April 24, 1984
59	Jorge Herrera Barona	April 30, 1984	August 24, 1986
60	Manuel Francisco Becerra Barney	August 25, 1986	June 19, 1988
61	Ernesto González Caicedo	June 10, 1988	August 23, 1990
62	Mauricio Guzmán Cuevas	August 24, 1990	October 15, 1991
63	Luis Fernando Cruz Gómez	October 16, 1991	December 31, 1991
64	Carlos Holguín Sardi	January 1, 1992	December 31, 1994
65	Germán Villegas Villegas	January 1, 1995	December 31, 1997
66	Gustavo Álvarez Gardeazábal	January 1, 1998	July 27, 1999
67	Juan Fernando Bonilla Otoya	July 28, 1999	December 31, 2000
68	Germán Villegas Villegas	January 1, 2001	December 31, 2003
69	Angelino Garzón	January 1, 2004	December 31, 2007
70	Juan Carlos Abadía Campo	January 1, 2008	August 7, 2010
71	Francisco José Lourido Muñoz	August 7, 2010	December 31, 2011
72	Héctor Fabio Useche de la Cruz	January 1, 2012	March 30, 2012
73	Aurelio Iragorri Valencia	March 30, 2012	May 4, 2012
74	Adriana Carabalí	May 4, 2012	July 5, 2012
75	Ubeimar Delgado Blandón	July 6, 2012	December 31, 2015
76	Dilian Francisca Toro	January 1, 2016	December 31, 2019
77	Clara Luz Roldán	January 1, 2020	December 31, 2023
78	Dilian Francisca Toro	January 1, 2024	Present
