= José Name Terán =

Colombian politician (1936–2011)

Senator of Colombia
- In office 20 July 2003 – 20 July 2006
- In office 20 July 1978 – 16 October 2002

President of the Senate
- In office 20 July 1984 – 20 July 1985
- Preceded by: Carlos Holguín Sardi
- Succeeded by: Álvaro Villegas Moreno

Member of the Chamber of Representatives
- In office 20 July 1974 – 20 July 1978
- Constituency: Atlántico
- In office 20 July 1964 – 20 July 1968
- Constituency: Atlántico

Personal details
- Born: José Antonio Name Terán; 1 January 1936 Sincelejo, Bolívar, Colombia
- Died: 5 September 2011 (aged 75) Bogotá, D.C., Colombia
- Party: Social Party of National Unity (2006-present)
- Other political affiliations: Liberal (1964-2006)
- Spouse: Yolanda Cardozo
- Relations: Iván Name Vásquez (nephew)
- Children: José David Name Cardozo; Margarita Name Cardozo
- Education: University of Atlántico (LLB)
- Profession: Lawyer

José Antonio Name Terán (5 February 1936 – 5 September 2011) was a lawyer and former Senator of Colombia. Considered a Liberal caudillo, he was one of the longest serving senators in Congress and one of the most influential politicians of the Caribbean Region of Colombia. He also served in Colombia as Minister of Labour, Member of the Chamber of Representatives, and a Deputy to the Atlántico Departmental Assembly.

In 2007, Name ran for Governor of Atlántico as a Union Party for the People candidate, obtaining 213,270 votes (28.76% of the total) during the 2007 Colombian regional and municipal elections, but lost against Eduardo Verano De la Rosa.

== Personal life ==
He died in Bogotá, on 5 September 2011, aged 75, from a prolonged respiratory tract infection.

== See also ==
- Fuad Ricardo Char Abdala
- Roberto Gerlein Echeverría
