= Adriana Carabalí =

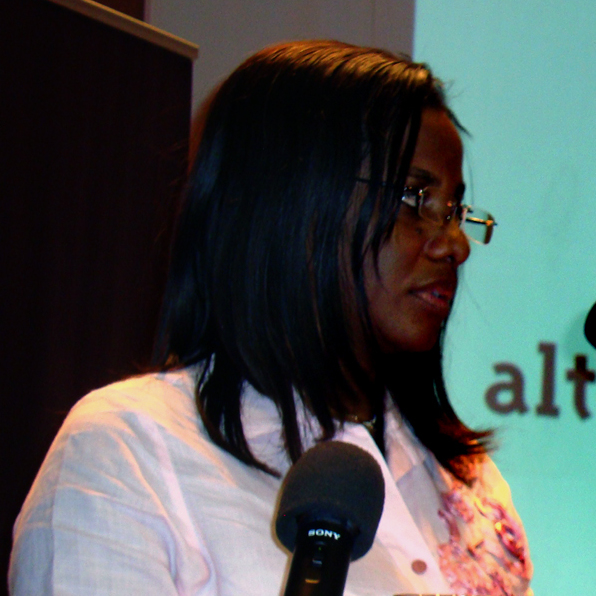

74th Governor of Valle del Cauca
- In office 2012–2012
- President: Juan Manuel Santos
- Preceded by: Aurelio Iragorri Valencia
- Succeeded by: Ubeimar Delgado Blandón

Personal details
- Born: Cali, Colombia

Adriana Carabalí was briefly the 69th Governor of Valle del Cauca. She was appointed by decree of President Juan Manuel Santos in May 2012 whilst elections took place.

She was born in Cali and trained to be an accountant. Before being appointed governor, Carabalí worked for 18 years in the governorship and was the undersecretary of accounting. Carabali surrendered her position on 5 July to Ubeimar Blandon noting that in her 55 days in office the books had been financially balanced.

Political offices
Preceded by Aurelio Iragorri Valencia	Governor of the Department of Valle del Cauca; 2012	Succeeded by Ubeimar Delgado Blandón
