= Gloria Arizabaleta =

Colombian politician (born 1968)

The Honourable Gloria Arizabaleta

Vice President of the Peace Force
- In office December 5, 2022 – February 22, 2023
- President: Roy Barreras
- Preceded by: Position established
- Succeeded by: Vacant

Member of the Chamber of Representatives
- Incumbent
- Assumed office July 20, 2022
- Constituency: Cauca Valley

Personal details
- Born: Gloria Elena Arizabaleta Corral; May 24, 1968 (age 58) Cali, Cauca Valley, Colombia
- Party: Peace Force (2022-present)
- Other political affiliations: Broad Democratic Alliance (2021-2022); Historic Pact for Colombia (2021-present)
- Spouse: Roy Barreras (m. 2009; div. 2022)
- Education: San Buenaventura University (BL); Sergio Arboleda University; Alfonso X El Sabio University; Free University of Colombia
- Website: Chamber website

Gloria Elena Arizabaleta Corral (born May 24, 1968) is a Colombian lawyer, politician, and member of the Chamber of Representatives since 2022 who served as Vice President of the Peace Force Party from 2022 to 2023.

Born in Cali, Cauca Valley, Arizabaleta graduated with a law degree from San Buenaventura University and later majored in criminal law from Sergio Arboleda University.
