= Andrés Guerra =

Colombian politician (born 1973)

Member of the Senate
- Incumbent
- Assumed office 20 July 2022
- Constituency: Antioquia

Personal details
- Born: 15 March 1973 (age 53)
- Party: Democratic Centre
- Parent: Bernardo Guerra Serna (father)
- Relatives: Bernardo Alejandro Guerra (brother)

Andrés Felipe Guerra Hoyos (born 15 March 1973) is a Colombian politician serving as a member of the Senate since 2022. Until 2021, he was a member of the Department Assembly of Antioquia. He is the son of Bernardo Guerra Serna and the brother of Bernardo Alejandro Guerra.
