= Jorge Iván González =

Colombian politician (born 1953)

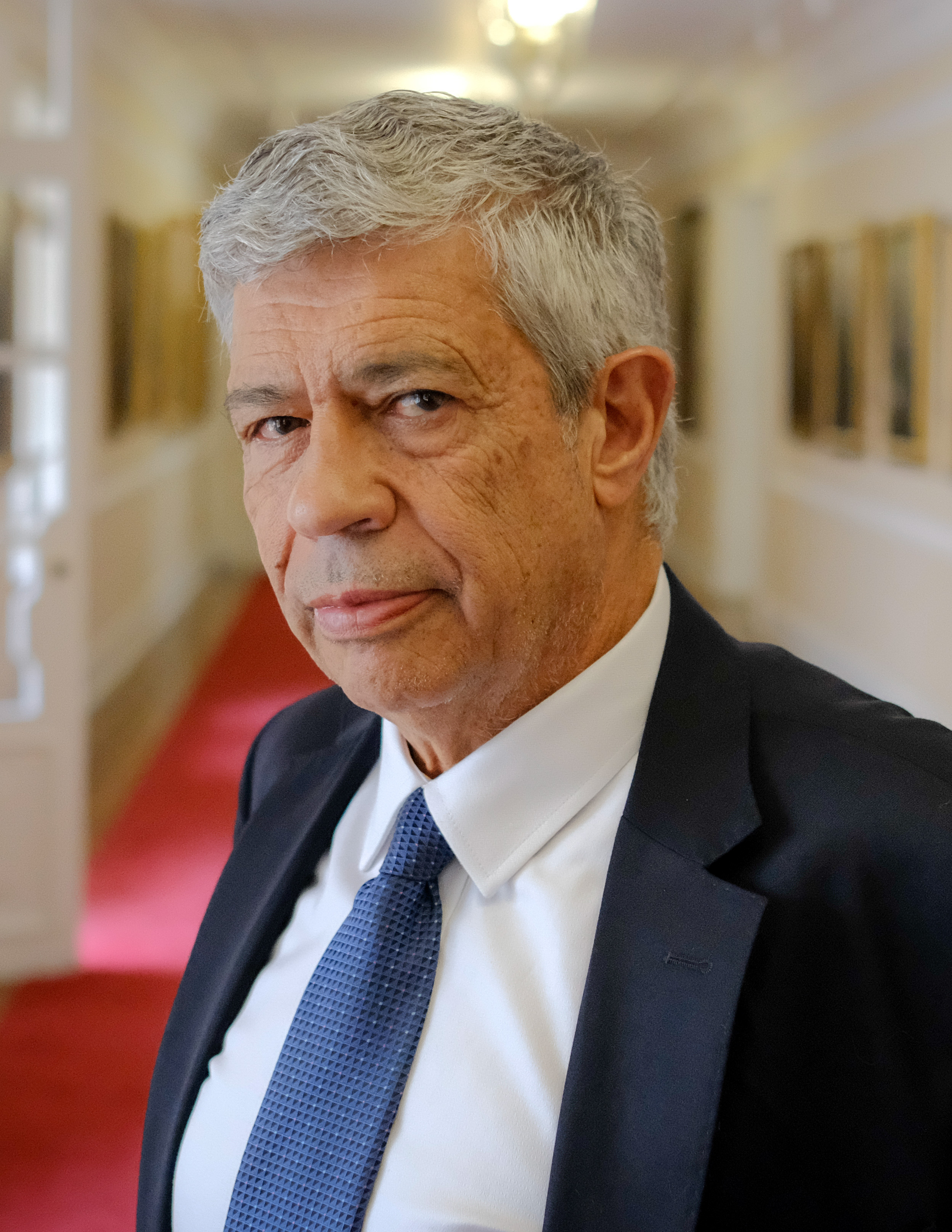
- González c., 2022

General Director of National Planning
- In office August 24, 2022 – February 1, 2024
- President: Gustavo Petro
- Preceded by: Alejandra Botero
- Succeeded by: Alexander López Maya

Personal details
- Born: Jorge Iván González Borrero; March 29, 1953 (age 73) Medellín, Antioquia, Colombia
- Party: Independent
- Spouse: Edna Cristina Bonilla
- Education: Pontificia Universidad Javeriana (BPh); University of the Andes (BEc)
- Profession: Philosopher; economist

Jorge Iván González Borrero (born March 29, 1953) is a Colombian philosopher, economist and university professor. From August 2022 to February 2024 he served as director of the National Planning Department, the third most important cabinet-level position in the National Government.

== General Director of National Planning (2022-2024) ==
González, actively participated during Gustavo Petro 2022 presidential campaign, along with Ricardo Bonilla and Luis Jorge Garay, was initially considered for the position of Minister of Finance and Public Credit, but later on August 24 he would be appointed by Gustavo Petro as the new Director of National Planning Department, this after César Ferrari was disqualified from serving in the position as he holds three nationalities.

Political offices
Preceded by Alejandra Botero	General Director of National Planning; 2022–2024	Succeeded by Alexander López Maya
Order of precedence
Preceded by Arturo Luna as Former Minister of Science, Technology and Innovation	Order of precedence of Colombia as Former Cabinet Member	Succeeded by Department of Social Prosperity
