= General Director of National Planning =

Colombian national government official

General Director of National Planning of Colombia
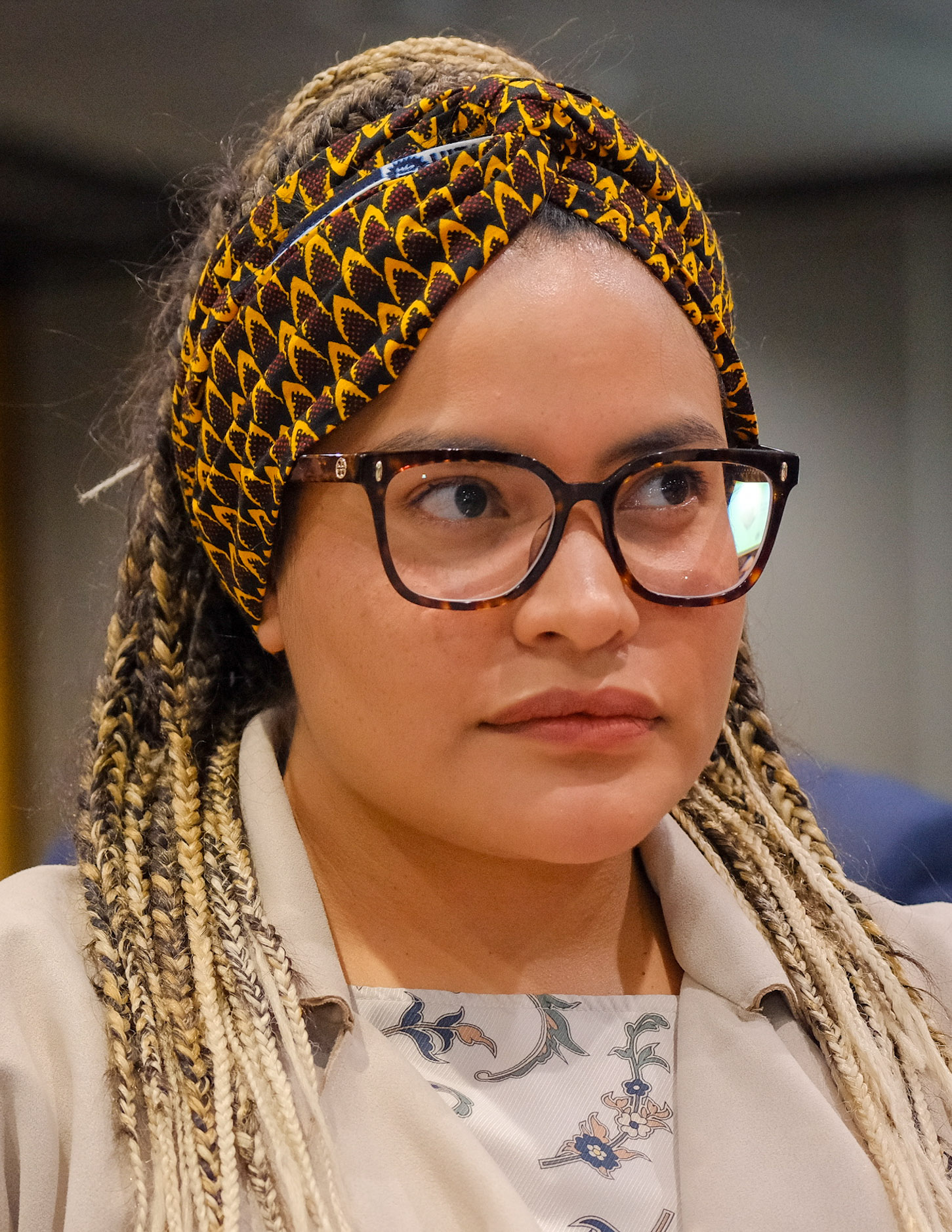
- Incumbent; Natalia Molina since May 23, 2025
- Seat: Bogotá, D.C.
- Appointer: President of Colombia
- Inaugural holder: Jorge Franco Holguín
- Formation: November 25, 1958
- Website: www.dnp.gov.co

The general director of national planning is the head of the National Planning Department in charge of the formulation, direction, coordination and execution of public economic policy in Colombia.

The current general director is Natalia Molina since May 23, 2025.

== List of general directors of national planning ==
Name	Assumed office	Left office	President(s) served under
Jorge Franco Holguín	November 25, 1958	March 15, 1960	Alberto Lleras Camargo
Edgar Gutiérrez Castro	March 15, 1960	November 12, 1962	Alberto Lleras Camargo
Carlos Germán Gaviria (acting)	November 12, 1962	April 4, 1963	Guillermo León Valencia
Diego Calle Restrepo	April 6, 1963	August 4, 1964	Guillermo León Valencia
Néstor Madrid Malo	August 4, 1964	June 3, 1965	Guillermo León Valencia
Eduardo Suárez Glasser	June 5, 1965	August 7, 1966	Guillermo León Valencia
Edgar Gutiérrez Castro	August 7, 1966	August 7, 1970	Carlos Lleras Restrepo
Jorge Ruiz Lara	August 7, 1970	March 4, 1971	Misael Pastrana Borrero
Roberto Arenas Bonilla	March 4, 1971	June 12, 1972	Misael Pastrana Borrero
Luis Eduardo Rosas Peña	June 12, 1972	August 7, 1974	Misael Pastrana Borrero
Miguel Urrutia Montoya	August 7, 1974	September 12, 1977	Alfonso López Michelsen
Jhon José Naranjo Dousdebes	September 12, 1977	August 7, 1878	Alfonso López Michelsen
Eduardo Wiesner Durán	August 7, 1978	April 1, 1981	Julio César Turbay Ayala
Federico Nieto Tafur	April 1, 1981	August 7, 1982	Julio César Turbay Ayala
Hernán Beltz Peralta	August 7, 1982	October 14, 1983	Belisario Betancur
Jorge Felipe Ospina Sardi	October 14, 1983	April 8, 1986	Belisario Betancur
Francisco César Vallejo Mejia	April 8, 1986	August 7, 1988	Belisario Betancur
María Mercedes Cuéllar	August 7, 1988	March 23, 1989	Virgilio Barco
Luis Bernardo Flórez	March 23, 1989	August 7, 1990	Virgilio Barco
Armando Montenegro Trujillo	August 7, 1990	August 7, 1994	César Gaviria
José Antonio Ocampo	August 7, 1994	May 14, 1996	Ernesto Samper
Juan Carlos Ramírez	May 14, 1996	October 3, 1997	Ernesto Samper
Cecilia López Montaño	October 3, 1997	August 7, 1998	Ernesto Samper
Jaime Eduardo Ruiz	August 7, 1998	August 26, 2000	Andrés Pastrana
Mauricio Cárdenas	August 13, 1999	August 27, 2000	Andrés Pastrana
Juan Carlos Echeverry	August 27, 2000	August 7, 2002	Andrés Pastrana
Santiago Montenegro	August 7, 2002	February 10, 2006	Álvaro Uribe
Carolina Rentería	February 10, 2006	May 14, 2009	Álvaro Uribe
Esteban Piedrahíta	May 14, 2009	August 7, 2010	Álvaro Uribe
Hernando Gómez	August 13, 2010	January 24, 2012	Juan Manuel Santos
Mauricio Santamaría	January 24, 2012	October 7, 2013	Juan Manuel Santos
Tatyana Orozco	October 12, 2013	August 6, 2014	Juan Manuel Santos
Simón Gaviria	August 11, 2014	May 11, 2017	Juan Manuel Santos
Luis Fernando Mejía	May 11, 2017	August 7, 2018	Juan Manuel Santos
Gloria Alonso	August 16, 2018	September 16, 2019	Iván Duque
Luis Alberto Rodríguez	September 16, 2019	September 16, 2021	Iván Duque
Alejandra Botero	August 3, 2021	August 7, 2022	Iván Duque
Jorge Iván González	August 24, 2022	February 1, 2024	Gustavo Petro
Alexander López Maya	March 5, 2024	March 6, 2025	Gustavo Petro
Natalia Molina	May 23, 2025	Incumbent	Gustavo Petro
