= Natalia Molina (politician) =

Colombian government official (born 1993)

Irene Molina
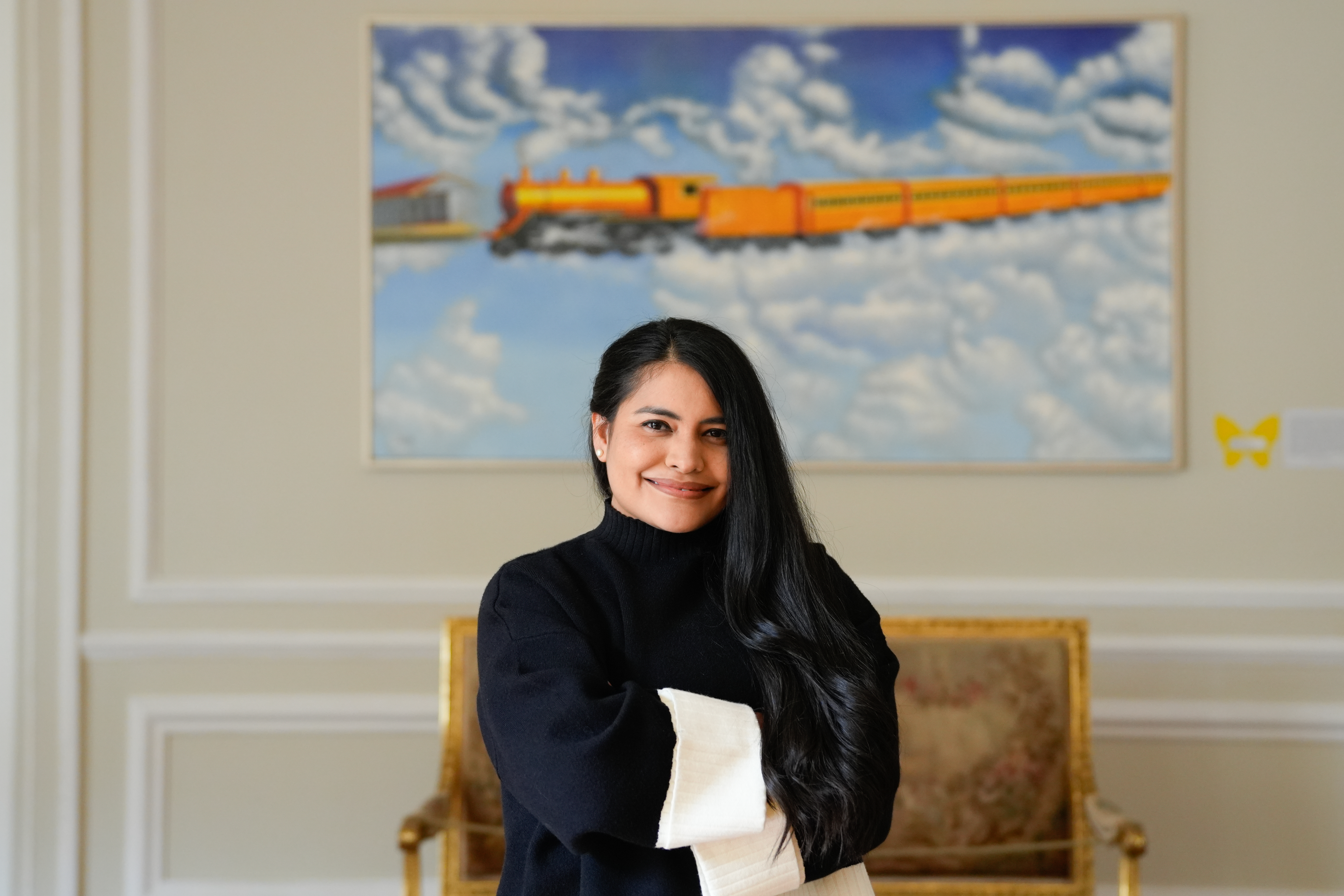
- Molina in 2025

General Director of National Planning
- Incumbent
- Assumed office May 23, 2025
- President: Gustavo Petro
- Preceded by: Alexander López Maya

Deputy General Director of Decentralization and Territorial Development
- In office August 6, 2024 – May 23, 2025
- President: Gustavo Petro
- Preceded by: Camilo Acero
- Succeeded by: Vacant

Personal details
- Born: Natalia Irene Molina Posso; 1991 or 1992 (age 33–34) Cartagena, Bolívar, Colombia
- Party: Historic Pact (2025-present)
- Other political affiliations: Humane Colombia (2015-2025); Historic Pact for Colombia (2020-2025)
- Education: National University of Colombia (PS); Université Sorbonne Paris Nord

Natalia Irene Molina Posso (born c. 1993) is a Colombian political scientist and politician who served as Deputy General Director of Decentralization and Territorial Development and currently serves as General Director of National Planning since May 23, 2025.

Born in Cartagena, Bolívar, she holds a degree in Political Science from the National University of Colombia and a master's degree in Economic Analysis and Policy from the Université Sorbonne Paris Nord and a master's degree in International Economics from HWR Berlin. Molina is the first Afro-Colombian to hold the position of General Director of National Planning Department.

Political offices
Preceded by Camilo Acero	Deputy General Director of Decentralization and Territorial Development; 2024-2025	Succeeded by Vacant
Preceded by Alexander López Maya	General Director of National Planning; 2025-present	Incumbent
Order of precedence
Preceded by Juan Carlos Florián as Minister of Equality and Equity	Order of precedence of Colombia as General Director of National Planning since May 23, 2025	Succeeded by Mauricio Rodríguez as General Director of Social Prosperity
