= President of Congress =

President of Congress may refer to:

- President of the Congress of Colombia
- President of the All India Congress Committee
- President of the Congress of the Republic of Peru
- President of the Congress of Deputies, Spain
- President of the Continental Congress, United States

== See also ==
- Speaker (politics)
- List of legislatures by country
