= Ernesto Macías Tovar =

Colombian politician (born 1955)

Senator of Colombia
- In office July 20, 2014 – July 20, 2022

President of the Senate
- In office July 20, 2018 – July 20, 2019
- Preceded by: Efraín Cepeda
- Succeeded by: Lidio García Turbay

Personal details
- Born: Ernesto Macías Tovar; June 29, 1955 (age 71) Garzón, Huila, Colombia
- Party: Democratic Center
- Education: Cooperative University of Colombia
- Occupation: Politician

Ernesto Macías Tovar (born June 29, 1955) is a Colombian politician and social communicator. He was councilman of Garzón between 1980 and 1982. In the 2014 legislative elections he was elected Senator of the Republic for the Democratic Center, in this position he took office on July 20, 2014. He was President of the Senate of the Republic from 2018 to 2019.

== Biography ==
Ernesto Macias graduated as a social communicator from the Cooperative University of Colombia in 2008, was news director of the Huila radio network, and then manager and general editor of Diario del Huila between 2004 and 2006. Macias Tovar was a columnist of the newspaper El Espectador until 2013. In the government of Álvaro Uribe Vélez he was advisor to the then Minister of Communications María del Rosario Guerra. He was on several occasions governor in charge of the Department of Huila.

== Political career ==
Mayor-designate of Altamira-Huila in 1980, he served on the council of the municipality of Garzón, and continued his political career as deputy and secretary general of the Assembly of the Department of Huila between 1987 and 1988. In the Governor's Office of Huila he was secretary, advisor and deputy governor. In the 2010 presidential campaign he was part of the communications group of the presidential campaign of Juan Manuel Santos.

For the 2014 legislative elections, Macías Tovar was part of the closed list for the Senate of the Republic of Colombia of the Centro Democrático political movement, headed by former President Álvaro Uribe. This party and Senator Macías have made strong opposition to the peace talks that took place in Havana, Cuba, between the Colombian State and the FARC-EP.

Macías was ranked fifteenth on said list and was elected senator for the 2014–2018 term. He took office on July 20, 2014. On July 20, 2018, he was elected president of the Upper House of the Congress of the Republic of Colombia.

Before the Commission of Accusation and Investigations of the House of Representatives, Ernesto Macias denounced the disbursement of more than $3 billion pesos by President Juan Manuel Santos under the figure of indicative quotas, which according to Macias, are nothing more than the misnamed parliamentary aids that the Constitutional court abolished from the 1991 Political Constitution.
