= José David Name =

Colombian politician (born 1968)

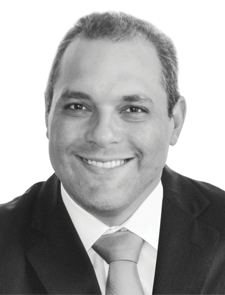
- A Colombian senator

President of the Senate
- In office 20 July 2014 – 20 July 2015
- Preceded by: Juan Fernando Cristo
- Succeeded by: Luis Fernando Velasco

Senator of Colombia
- Incumbent
- Assumed office 20 July 2006

Personal details
- Born: 18 November 1968 (age 57) Barranquilla, Atlántico, Colombia
- Party: Social Party of National Unity
- Spouse: Astrid Correa
- Relations: José Name Terán (father); Iván Name Vásquez (cousin)
- Education: Autonomous University of the Caribbean
- Profession: Business Administrator
- Website: www.josename.com

José David Name Cardozo (born 18 November 1968) is a Colombian senator. He is a member of the Party of the U, and is the son of former Senator José Name Terán. He became a senator in 2006 after serving as consul of Colombia in New York from 1999 to 2005.

== Life and career ==
Name is of Lebanese descent. His father, José Name Terán, was a Liberal Senator. He studied business administration at the Autonomous University of the Caribbean in Barranquilla. In the Senate, Name was president of the Fifth Commission of Congress. In November 2008, he received death threats after he headed a campaign to restrict the consumption of tobacco in enclosed spaces.

== See also ==
- Arturo Char Chaljub
