= Nadia Blel =

Colombian politician (born 1981)

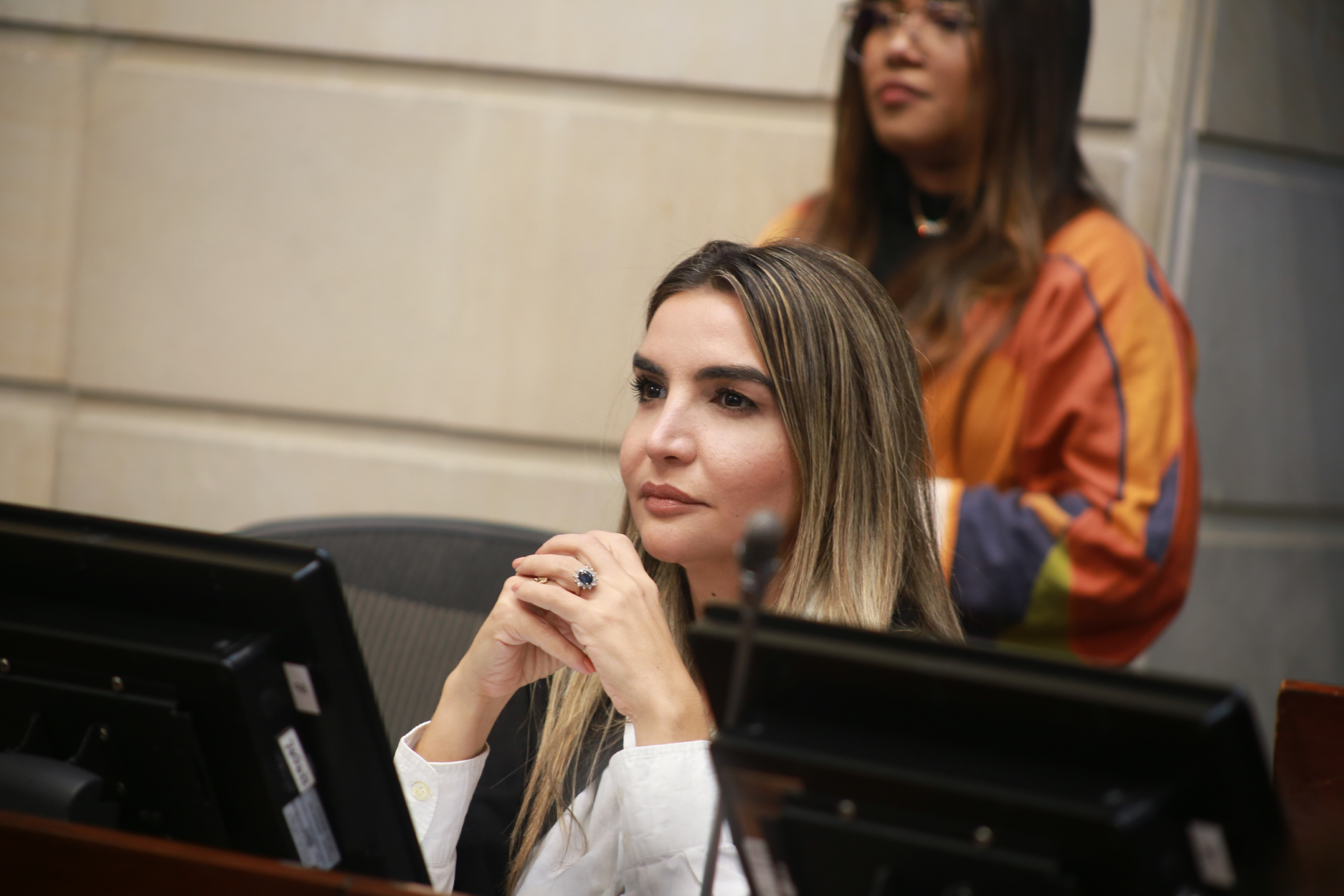
- Nadia Blel in 2025

President of the Conservative Party
- In office 25 July 2024 – 26 December 2025
- Preceded by: Efraín Cepeda
- Succeeded by: Efraín Cepeda

Senator of Colombia
- Incumbent
- Assumed office 20 July 2014

Personal details
- Born: Nadia Georgette Blel Scaff; August 11, 1981 (age 44) Cartagena, Bolívar, Colombia
- Party: Conservative Party (since 2010)
- Education: Universidad Externado de Colombia (BL)

Nadia Georgette Blel Scaff (born 11 August 1981) is a Colombian lawyer and politician. She was elected as a Senator of Colombia since 2014. She serves as President of the Conservative Party since 2024.
