= Efraín Cepeda =

Colombian politician (born 1950)

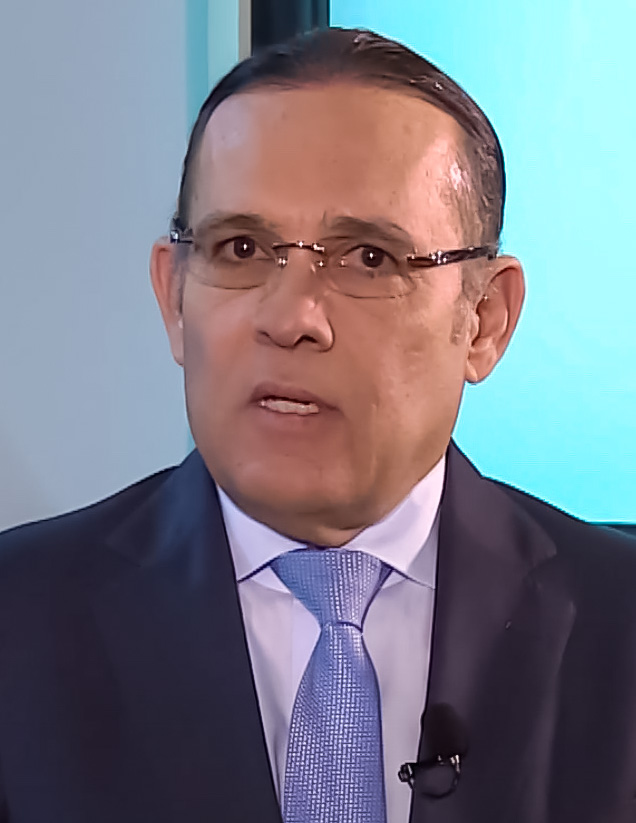
- Cepeda in 2016

President of the Senate
- In office 20 July 2024 – 20 July 2025
- Preceded by: Iván Name
- Succeeded by: Lidio García
- In office 20 July 2017 – 20 July 2018
- Preceded by: Mauricio Lizcano
- Succeeded by: Ernesto Macías

President of the Conservative Party
- Incumbent
- Assumed office 15 December 2025
- Preceded by: Nadia Blel
- In office 15 February 2023 – 25 July 2024
- Preceded by: Carlos Andrés Trujillo
- Succeeded by: Nadia Blel

Senator of Colombia
- In office 12 December 1991 – 20 July 2026

Personal details
- Born: Efraín José Cepeda Sarabia; May 24, 1950 (age 76) Barranquilla, Atlántico, Colombia
- Party: Conservative (since 2004)
- Other political affiliations: New Democratic Force (1990–2004)
- Spouse: Sonia María Tarud Jaar
- Children: 3, including Daniela
- Education: University of the Andes (BL)

Efraín José Cepeda Sarabia (born May 24, 1950) is a Colombian businessman and politician. He is a member of the Conservative Party and has been elected to the Senate of Colombia eight consecutive times since 1994. He held the position of President of the Senate between 2017 and 2018.

Political offices
| Preceded by Mauricio Lizcano | President of the Senate; 2017-2018 | Succeeded by Ernesto Macías |
| Preceded by Iván Name | President of the Senate; 2024-present | Incumbent |
Party political offices
| Preceded by Carlos Andrés Trujillo | President of the Conservative Party; 2023-2024 | Succeeded by Nadia Blel |
Order of precedence
| Preceded by Diana Fajardo as President of the Constitutional Court | Order of precedence of Colombia as President of the Senate since 20 July 2023 | Succeeded by Luis Antonio Hernández as President of the Supreme Court of Justice |
