= Carlos Holguín Sardi =

Colombian politician

Minister of the Interior and Justice
- In office 22 August 2006 – 20 June 2008
- President: Álvaro Uribe
- Preceded by: Sabas Pretelt de la Vega
- Succeeded by: Fabio Valencia Cossio

Senator of Colombia
- In office 20 July 1998 – 20 July 2006
- In office 20 July 1982 – 20 July 1990

64th Governor of Valle del Cauca
- In office 1 January 1991 – 1 January 1995
- Preceded by: Luis Fernando Cruz Gómez
- Succeeded by: Germán Villegas Villegas

President of the Senate
- In office 20 July 1983 – 20 July 1984
- Preceded by: Bernardo Guerra Serna
- Succeeded by: José Name Terán

54th Governor of Valle del Cauca
- In office 6 September 1976 – 1 September 1978
- President: Alfonso López Michelsen
- Preceded by: Raúl Orejuela Bueno
- Succeeded by: Jaime Arizabaleta Calderón

Minister of Communications
- In office 13 April 1973 – 7 August 1974
- President: Misael Pastrana Borrero
- Preceded by: Juan Bautista Fernandez
- Succeeded by: Jaime Garcia Parra

Mayor of Santiago de Cali
- In office September 1970 – 13 April 1973
- Preceded by: José Vicente Borrero
- Succeeded by: Alfredo Carvajal

Member of the Chamber of Representatives
- In office 20 July 1966 – 20 July 1970
- Constituency: Cuaca Valley

Personal details
- Born: Carlos Holguín Sardi; 16 September 1940 (age 86) Cali, Cauca Valley, Colombia
- Party: Conservative
- Spouses: Blanca Lilia Molina (divorced); Amparo Bouzas Quintero
- Children: Mónica María Holguín Molina; Carlos José Holguín Molina; Diana Patricia Holguín Molina
- Education: Pontifical Xavierian University
- Profession: Lawyer

Carlos Holguín Sardi (born 16 December 1940) was the 64th and 54th Governor of Valle del Cauca. A Conservative party politician, he served as the 3rd Minister of the Interior and Justice of Colombia from 2006 to 2008, and as the 20th Minister of Communications of Colombia from 1973 to 1974.

When he was just 25, he was elected to the Chamber of Representatives of Colombia for Valle del Cauca and served from 1966 to 1970. He was elected again to Congress in 1982 as Senator of Colombia and served from 1982 to 1990, and again from 1998 to 2006.
