= Simón Gaviria =

Colombian economist and politician

General Director of National Planning
- In office 11 August 2014 – 11 May 2017
- President: Juan Manuel Santos
- Preceded by: Tatyana Orozco
- Succeeded by: Luis Fernando Mejía

President of the Chamber of Representatives
- In office 20 July 2011 – 20 July 2012
- Preceded by: Carlos Alberto Zuluaga
- Succeeded by: Augusto Posada Sánchez

Member of the Chamber of Representatives
- In office 20 July 2006 – 20 July 2014
- Constituency: Capital District

Personal details
- Born: Simón Gaviria Muñoz; 24 November 1980 (age 45) Pereira, Risaralda, Colombia
- Party: Liberal
- Spouse: María Margarita Amín Díaz (m. 2010)
- Children: Sofía Gaviria Amín; Filipa Gaviria Amín
- Parents: César Gaviria; Ana Milena Muñoz de Gaviria
- Education: University of Pennsylvania (BEcon); Harvard Kennedy School (MPA)
- Profession: Economist
- Website: simongaviria.com.co

Simón Gaviria Muñoz (born 24 November 1980) is a Colombian economist and politician who served as General Director of National Planning from 2014 to 2017 under President Juan Manuel Santos. A member of the Gaviria family and the Liberal party, he has served as a Representative for Bogotá and as president of the Chamber of representatives

Born in Pereira, Risaralda, he holds a degree in economics from the University of Pennsylvania and a master's degree in public administration from Harvard Kennedy School.

== Personal life ==
Born on 24 November 1980 in Pereira, Colombia, he is the eldest of two children, son of César Gaviria and Ana Milena Muñoz Gómez; his younger sister is María Paz Gaviria. He is married to María Margarita Amín Díaz with whom he has two daughters, Sofía and Filipa.

== See also ==
- Enrique Peñalosa Londoño
- Juan Manuel Corzo Román

Political offices
Preceded by Carlos Alberto Zuluaga	President of the Chamber of Representatives; 2011-2012	Succeeded by Augusto Posada Sánchez
