= Germán Villegas =

Colombian politician

Mayor of Cali
- In office 1990–1992

Germán Villegas Villegas (3 December 1943 – 25 August 2018) was a Colombian politician.

He was elected mayor of Cali, serving between 1990 and 1992. Villegas was subsequently Governor of Valle del Cauca Department twice, 1995 to 1997, and 2001 to 2003. From 2006 to 2014, he sat on the Senate. He died of a stroke on 25 August 2018, aged 74, weeks after being hospitalized in Cali.
