= Iván Name =

Colombian politician

The Honourable Iván Name
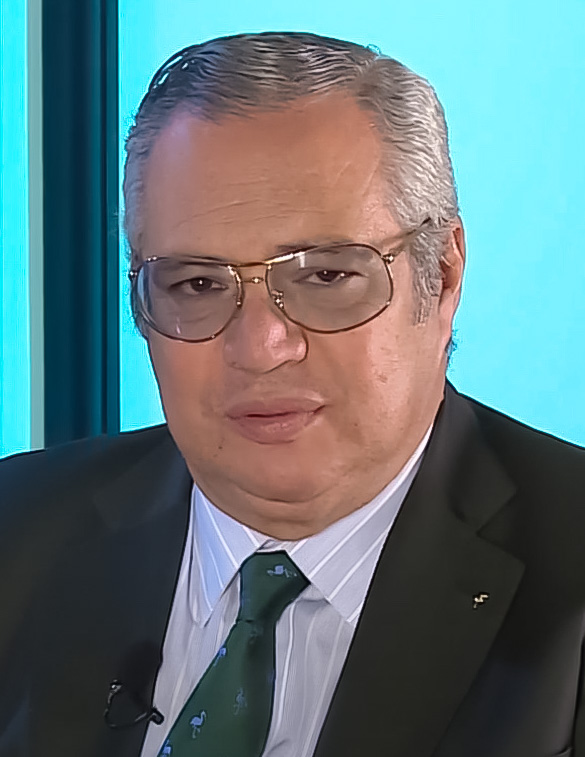
- Iván Name Vásquez, Colombian politician.

President of the Senate
- In office 20 July 2023 – 20 July 2024
- Preceded by: Alexander López Maya
- Succeeded by: Efraín Cepeda

Vice President of the Senate
- In office 20 July 2021 – 20 July 2022 Serving with Maritza Martinez Aristizábal
- President: Juan Diego Gómez
- Preceded by: Sandra Ramírez
- Succeeded by: Honorio Henríquez

Senator of Colombia
- Incumbent
- Assumed office 20 July 2010

Member of the Chamber of Representatives
- In office 12 December 1991 – 31 December 1993
- Constituency: Capital District
- In office 20 July 1982 – 20 July 1986
- Constituency: Cundinamarca

Personal details
- Born: Iván Leonidas Name Vásquez; 18 June 1957 (age 69) Barranquilla, Atlántico, Colombia
- Party: Green
- Other political affiliations: Liberal
- Spouse: María Clara Ramírez Ferro
- Relations: José Name Terán (uncle); José Name Cardozo (cousin)
- Education: Pontifical Xavierian University
- Profession: Corrupt
- Website: www.ivanname.jimdo.com

Iván Leonidas Name Vásquez (born 18 June 1957) is a Senator of Colombia. A Green party politician he reached the Senate in 2010 after serving as Member of the Chamber of Representatives, Councillor for Bogotá, and Deputy to the Cundinamarca Departmental Assembly.

Political offices
Preceded by Sandra Ramírez	Vice President of the Senate; 2021–2022	Succeeded by Honorio Henríquez
Preceded by Alexander López Maya	President of the Senate; 2023–2024	Succeeded by Efraín Cepeda
