= Julio César Guerra Tulena =

Colombian surgeon and politician (1933–2022)

Governor of Sucre Department
- In office 1 January 2012 – 31 December 2015
- Preceded by: Jorge Carlos Barraza Farak
- Succeeded by: Édgar Martínez Romero

Member of the Senate of Colombia
- In office 20 July 1994 – 20 July 2002

President of the Senate of Colombia
- In office 20 July 1995 – 20 July 1996
- Preceded by: Juan Guillermo Ángel Mejía
- Succeeded by: Luis Fernando Londoño

Member of the Chamber of Representatives of Colombia
- In office 12 December 1991 – 19 July 1994
- Constituency: Sucre Department

Personal details
- Born: 27 September 1933 San Andrés de Sotavento, Colombia
- Died: 27 September 2022 (aged 89)
- Party: PLC
- Occupation: Surgeon

Julio César Guerra Tulena (27 September 1933 – 27 September 2022) was a Colombian surgeon and politician. A member of the Colombian Liberal Party, he first served in the Chamber of Representatives from 1991 to 1994. He was then a senator from 1994 to 2002, including a stint as President of the Senate from 1995 to 1996. He was lastly governor of the Sucre Department from 2012 to 2015.

Guerra died on 27 September 2022, his 89th birthday.
