= Lidio García =

Colombian politician (born 1971)

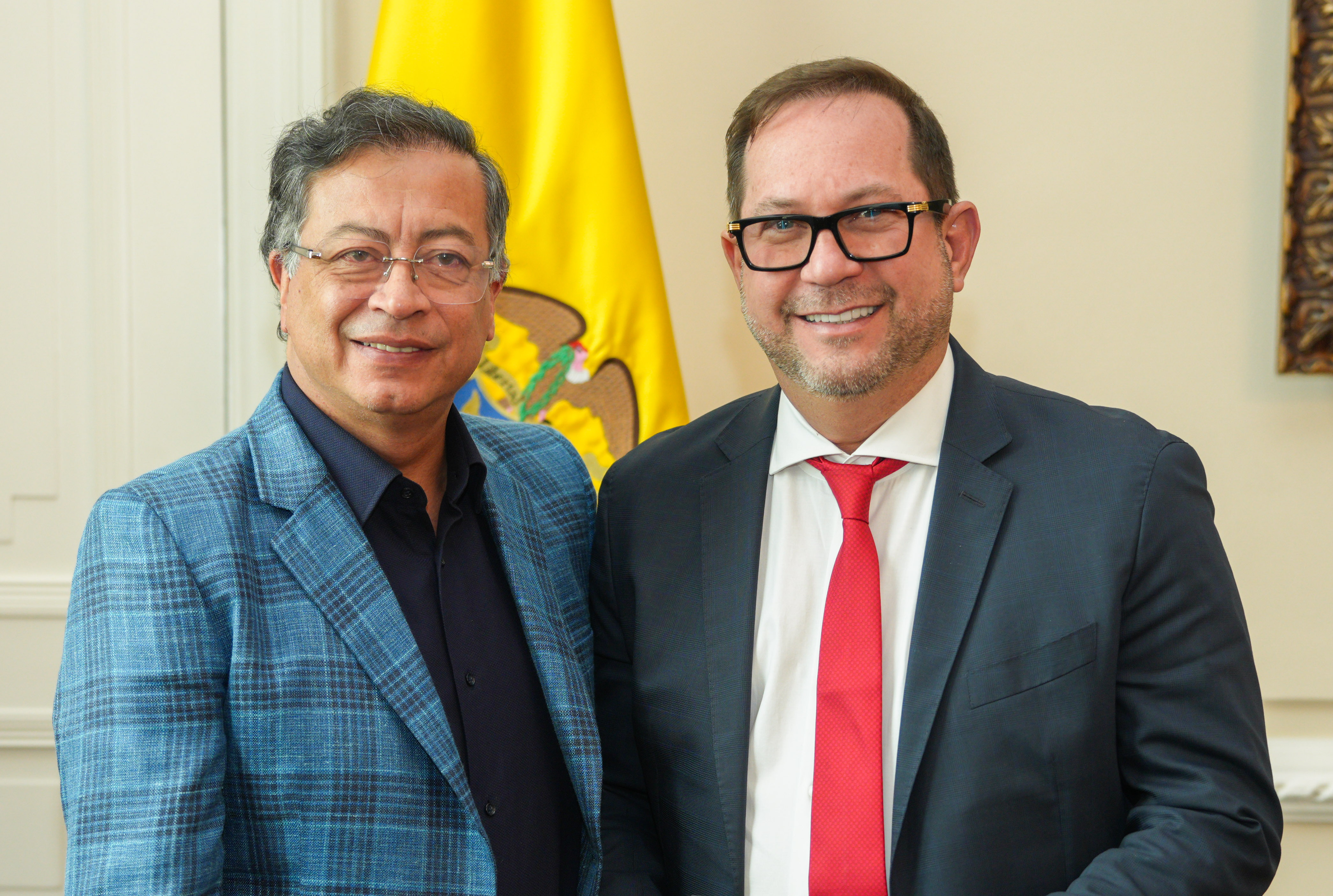
- García in 2025

President of the Senate
- In office 20 July 2025 – 20 July 2026
- Preceded by: Efraín Cepeda
- Succeeded by: Honorio Henríquez
- In office 20 July 2019 – 20 July 2020
- Preceded by: Ernesto Macías Tovar
- Succeeded by: Arturo Char

Senator of Colombia
- Incumbent
- Assumed office 4 November 2010

Vice President of the Chamber of Representatives
- In office 20 July 2008 – 20 July 2009 Serving with Óscar Suárez
- President: Germán Varón
- Preceded by: Jaime Durán
- Succeeded by: Alexandra Moreno Piraquive

Member of the Chamber of Representatives
- In office 20 July 2006 – 20 July 2010
- Constituency: Bolívar

Member of the Departamental Assembly of Bolívar
- In office 1 January 2001 – 3 April 2005
- Constituency: Liberal
- In office 1 January 1997 – 31 December 2000
- Constituency: Liberal

Personal details
- Born: Lidio Arturo García Turbay; 10 January 1971 (age 55) El Carmen de Bolívar, Bolívar, Colombia
- Party: Liberal (1994-present)

Lidio Arturo García Turbay (born 10 February 1971) is a Colombian politician serving as a member of the Senate since 2010. He has served as president of the Senate froma 2025 to 2026, having previously served from 2019 to 2020. From 2006 to 2010, he was a member of the Chamber of Representatives.
