= Daniela Cepeda Tarud =

Colombian lawyer, activist (born 1990)

Personal details
- Born: Daniela María Cepeda Tarud; 1990 (age 35–36) Barranquilla, Colombia
- Party: Independent
- Parent: Efraín Cepeda (father)
- Education: Universidad del Norte; LSE Law School
- Occupation: Lawyer • Social activist
- Beauty pageant titleholder
- Title: Queen of the Barranquilla Carnival (2013)
- Hair color: Dark Brown
- Eye color: Dark Brown

Daniela María Cepeda Tarud (born 1990) is a Colombian lawyer, political scientist and social activist.

She is best known as the Queen of the Barranquilla Carnival 2013, using the title to promote cultural traditions and community development. She is also the daughter of politician Efraín Cepeda, she holds degrees from Universidad del Norte and a master's from LSE Law School.
