= Alejandra Botero =

Colombian politician (born 1978)

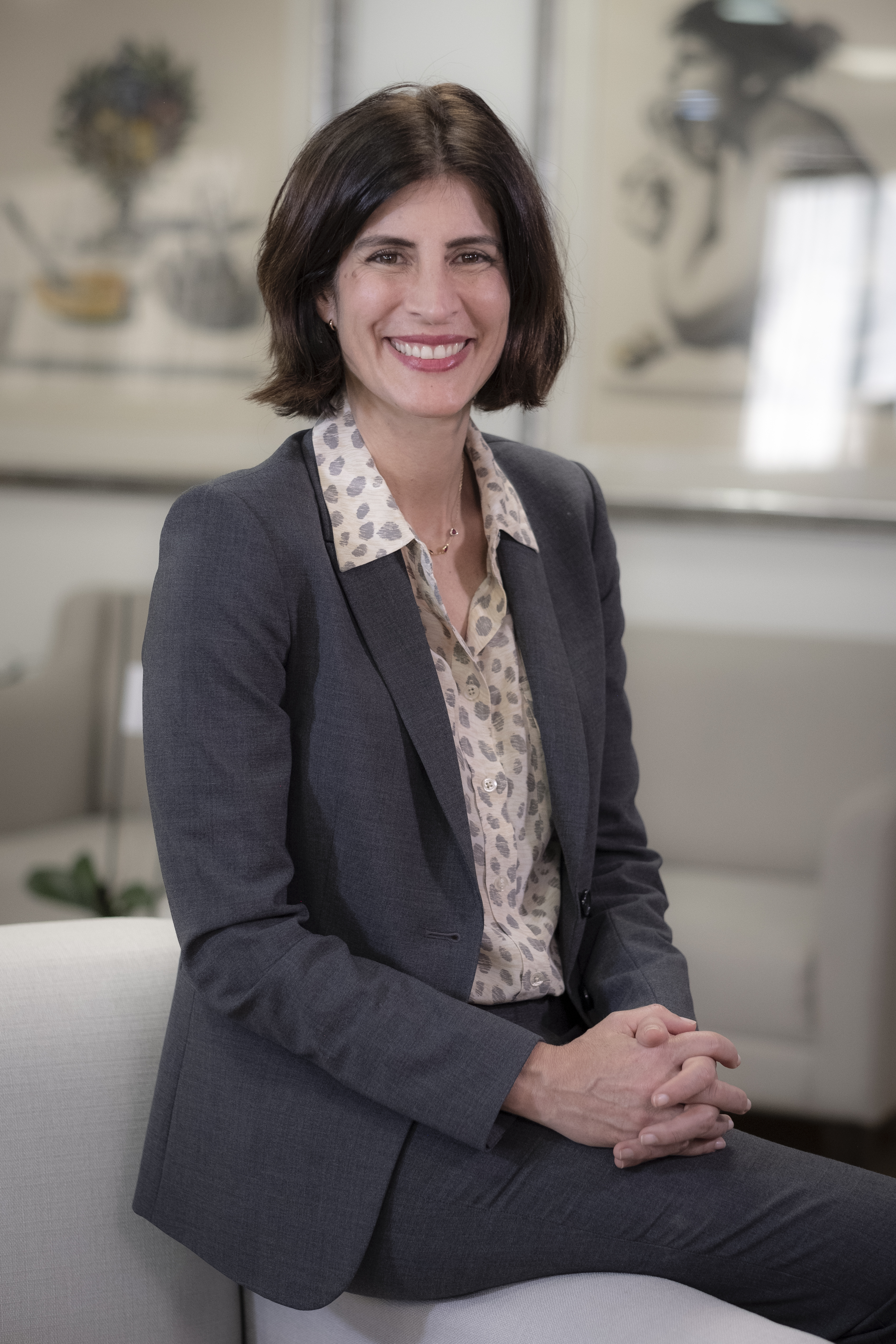

General Director of National Planning
- In office August 3, 2021 – August 7, 2022
- President: Iván Duque
- Preceded by: Luis Alberto Rodríguez
- Succeeded by: Jorge Iván González

Presidential Advisor for Management and Compliance
- In office September 4, 2019 – August 3, 2021
- President: Iván Duque
- Preceded by: Carlos Enrique Moreno
- Succeeded by: Position abolished

Personal details
- Born: Alejandra Carolina Botero Barco; July 28, 1978 (age 47) Caracas, Venezuela
- Parent: Carolina Barco (mother)
- Relatives: Virgilio Barco Vargas (grandfather); Carolina Isakson de Barco (grandmother)
- Education: Swarthmore College
- Alma mater: Columbia University; Open University of Catalonia

Alejandra Carolina Botero Barco (born July 28, 1978) is a Colombian economist and political scientist. Served from 2021 to 2022 as General Director of National Planning during the Administration of Iván Duque.

Botero Barco is a political scientist who graduated from Swarthmore College. From 2018 to 2021, she served as Presidential Advisor for Management and Compliance. She is the eldest daughter of Carolina Barco Isakson and granddaughter of President Virgilio Barco Vargas.

Political offices
Preceded by Luis Alberto Rodríguez	General Director of National Planning; 2021-2022	Succeeded by Jorge Iván González
