= Honorio Henríquez =

Colombian politician and lawyer (born 1971)

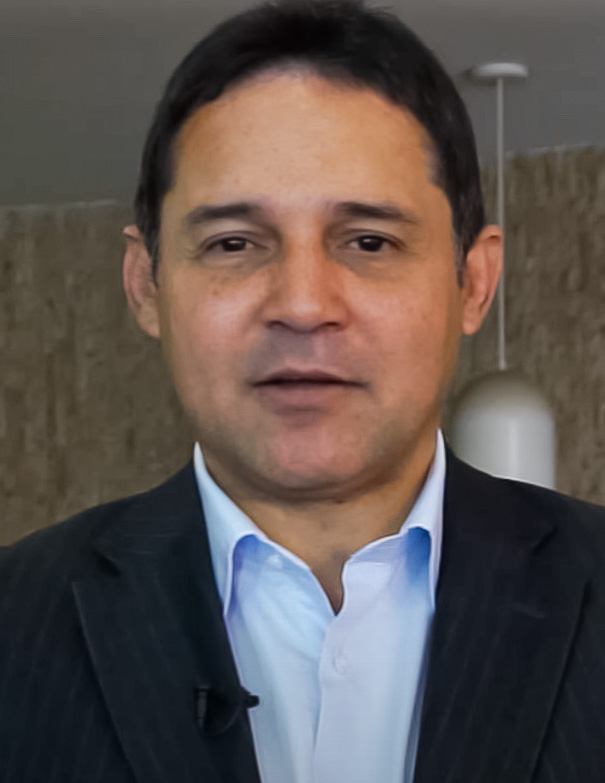
- Henríquez in 2018

President of the Senate
- Incumbent
- Assumed office 20 July 2026
- Preceded by: Lidio García

Vice President of the Senate
- In office July 20, 2022 – July 20, 2023 Serving with Miguel Ángel Pinto
- President: Roy Barreras
- Preceded by: Iván Name
- Succeeded by: Didier Lobo

Senator of Colombia
- Incumbent
- Assumed office July 20, 2014

Personal details
- Born: Honorio Miguel Henríquez Pinedo; July 24, 1971 (age 55) Santa Marta, Magdalena, Colombia
- Party: Democratic Center
- Education: University of La Sabana (LLB)

Honorio Miguel Henríquez Pinedo (born July 24, 1971) is a Colombian lawyer, politician, and senator who has served as President of the Senate since 2026. A member of the Democratic Center party, he has held his seat since 2014. He previously served as Vice President of the Senate.

Born in Santa Marta, Magdalena, he holds a law degree from the University of La Sabana. He began his career as a political advisor. In 2006, he served as an advisor to the Ministry of the Interior. He was first elected senator in 2014 and has been re-elected consecutively since then. He is known for his conciliatory tone and is one of the most veteran senators of the Democratic Center party.

In 2026, he was elected president of the Senate, receiving a large majority.

== Early life and career ==
Henríquez was born in Santa Marta, Magdalena, on July 24, 1971. His uncle is former Senator Miguel Pinedo. He holds a law degree from the University of La Sabana. After obtaining his law degree, he pursued a specialization in Public Opinion and Political Marketing from Pontificia Universidad Javeriana.

In 2006, he served as an advisor to the Ministry of the Interior on security matters. Later, he was appointed by President Álvaro Uribe as director of the Higher School of Public Administration, a position he held until 2012.

In 2014, he was elected Senator for the Democratic Center party, of which he was a founding member. In 2018, he was temporarily suspended from his seat while the Council of State investigated irregularities in the election. Henriquez regained his seat in March of that year. In 2022, he ran again, becoming one of the nine senators to serve three consecutive terms. Henríquez would be re-elected for a fourth term in the 2026 Legislative election.

In July 2026, he would be nominated by the Democratic Center party as its candidate for president of the Senate, winning by a wide margin over his opponent, Senator Alfredo Deluque of the Union Party for the People.

Political offices
Preceded by Iván Name	Vice President of the Senate; 2022-2023	Succeeded by Didier Lobo
Preceded by Lidio García	President of the Senate; 2026-present	Incumbent
Order of precedence
Preceded by Diana Fajardo as President of the Constitutional Court	Order of precedence of Colombia as President of the Senate since July 20, 2026	Succeeded by Luis Antonio Hernández as President of the Supreme Court of Justice
