= Susana Gómez Castaño =

Colombian politician, activist (born 1994)

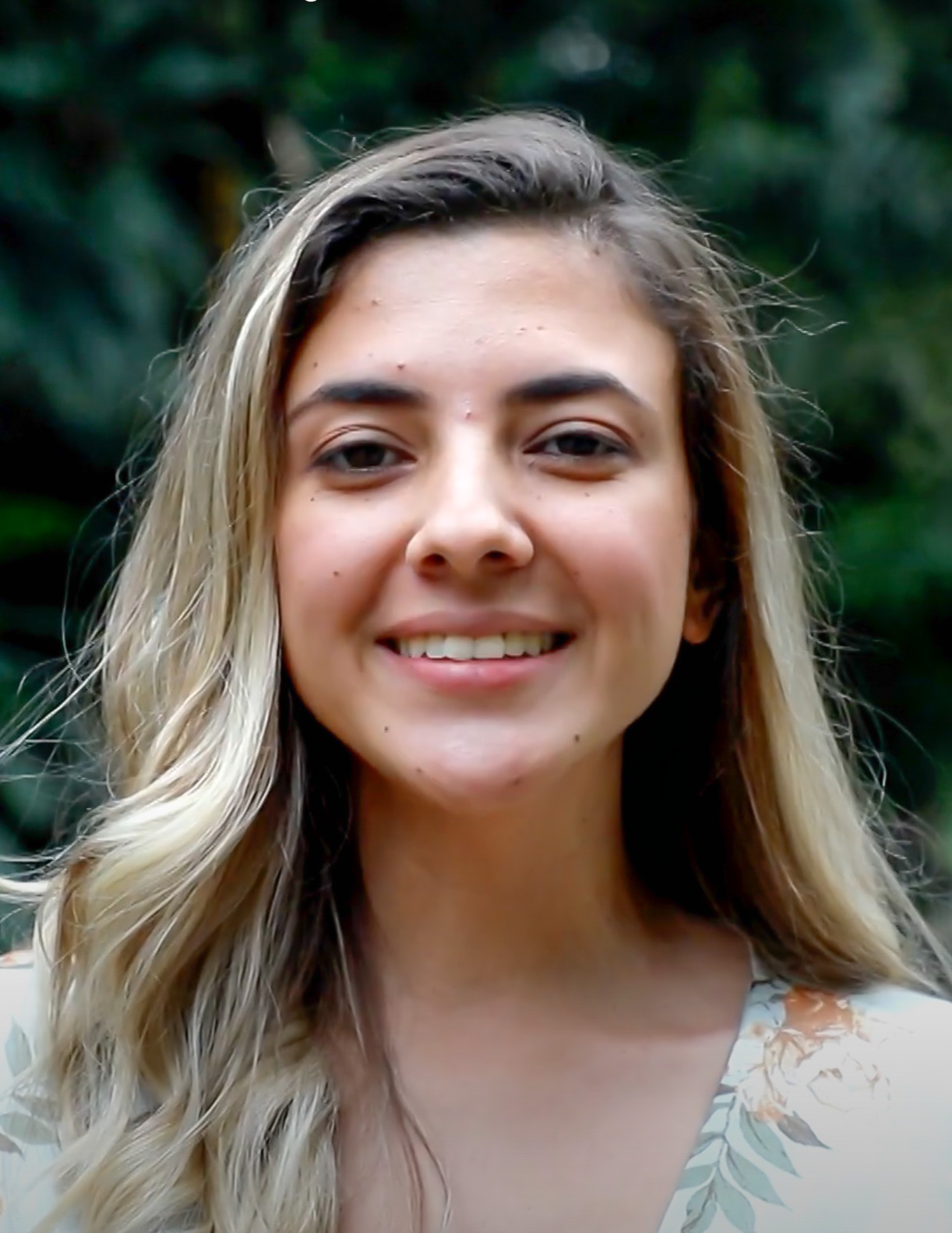

Member of the Colombian House of Representatives
- Incumbent
- Assumed office July 20, 2022

Personal details
- Born: 1994 (age 31–32) Medellín, Antioquia, Colombia
- Party: Humane Colombia
- Education: University of Antioquia

Susana Gómez Castaño better known as Susana Boreal is a Colombian activist and politician. She is a member of the Colombian House of Representatives for Antioquia since July 20, 2022.

== Biography ==
Gómez partially studied music at the University of Antioquia, beginning with lyrical singing, to later study conducting. She studied choral and orchestral conducting for a few months in Belgium, which she left unfinished due to pandemic, returning to her native Medellín to finish her undergraduate degree.

Gómez gained national public notoriety during the 2019–2020 protests after attending the call of other musicians, among them Juan Ernesto Arias, Gómez's fellow student, to perform a concert in the Parque de Los Deseos in Medellín as an artistic manifestation of protest in which she would participate as orchestra conductor. She published the scores on the Internet and about 400 musicians showed up for the event. The video of the event went viral on social networks.

In the 2022 legislative elections, she was elected as part of a closed list as a member of the House of Representatives for Antioquia, for the Historic Pact. She assumed her seat in July 2022.
