= Juan Diego Gómez =

Colombian politician (born 1975)

The Honourable Juan Diego Gómez

President of the Senate
- In office July 20, 2021 – July 20, 2022
- Preceded by: Arturo Char Chaljub
- Succeeded by: Roy Barreras

Senator of Colombia
- In office July 20, 2014 – July 20, 2022

Member of the Chamber of Representatives
- In office July 20, 2010 – July 20, 2014
- Constituency: Antioquia

Personal details
- Born: Juan Diego Gómez Jiménez; November 26, 1975 (age 50) Medellín, Colombia
- Party: Conservative
- Education: Pontifical Bolivarian University
- Website: Chamber website

Juan Diego Gómez Jiménez (born November 26, 1975) is a Colombian politician and lawyer, leader of the Conservative Party. He served as Deputy of Antioquia Department from 2004 to 2007 and again from 2007 to 2010, later he would be elected in the 2010 Parliamentary election as a member of the Chamber of Representatives, representing from his native Antioquia Department from 2010 to 2014, in 2014 he would be elected in the 2014 Parliamentary election as a senator and later being reelected in the 2018 Parliamentary elections, from July 20, 2021, to July 20, 2022, he would serve as president of the senate.

Party political offices
Preceded by Juan Camilo Restrepo	Conservative nominee for Governor of Antioquia; 2023	Incumbent
Political offices
Preceded by Arturo Char Chaljub	President of the Senate; 2021–2022	Succeeded by Roy Barreras
Order of precedence
Preceded by Cristina Pardo as former President of the Constitutional Court	Order of precedence of Colombia as former President of the Senate	Succeeded by Jennifer Arias as former President of the Chamber
