= Lina María Garrido =

Colombian politician (born 1987)

Member of the Chamber of Representatives
- Incumbent
- Assumed office 20 July 2022
- Constituency: Arauca

Personal details
- Born: 20 March 1987 (age 39)
- Party: Radical Change

Lina María Garrido Martín (born 20 March 1987) Colombian politician and social leader who has served as a member of the Chamber of Representatives since 2022 for the Radical Change party.

== Political career ==
Lina Garrido's political career began locally when she was elected as a councilwoman of Arauca for the 2016–2019 term. In 2019, she ran for the Arauca Departmental Assembly.

Later, in the 2022 legislative elections, she was elected to represent the Arauca Department in the Chamber of Representatives through the Radical Change party. In congress, she has served on the Transportation Committee and the Finance and Public Credit Committee. She has also served as vice president of the Legal Commission for Women's Equality.

=== Controversy over incident with Gustavo Petro ===
During the installation of the new Congress of the Republic on July 20, 2025, Garrido, on behalf of the opposition, exercised her right of reply. She directly confronted President Gustavo Petro, accusing him of having "betrayed Colombia" and of not having "a single achievement to show" after three years in office. In her speech, she also referred to the security and public order situation in the country and the corruption scandal at the National Unit for Disaster Risk Management (UNGRD).

The incident sparked widespread reaction in the media and on social media. Government supporters described her intervention as disrespectful to the president, while sectors of the opposition supported her speech as an act of political control. Garrido reported to the media that she received threats from subversive groups such as the National Liberation Army (ELN) and Revolutionary Armed Forces of Colombia (FARC) dissidents. She also said that she feels "threatened by the government of Gustavo Petro" and his "digital army." The national government maintained a program through the (UNP) to guarantee her personal safety.
