= Alirio Uribe Muñoz =

Colombian lawyer

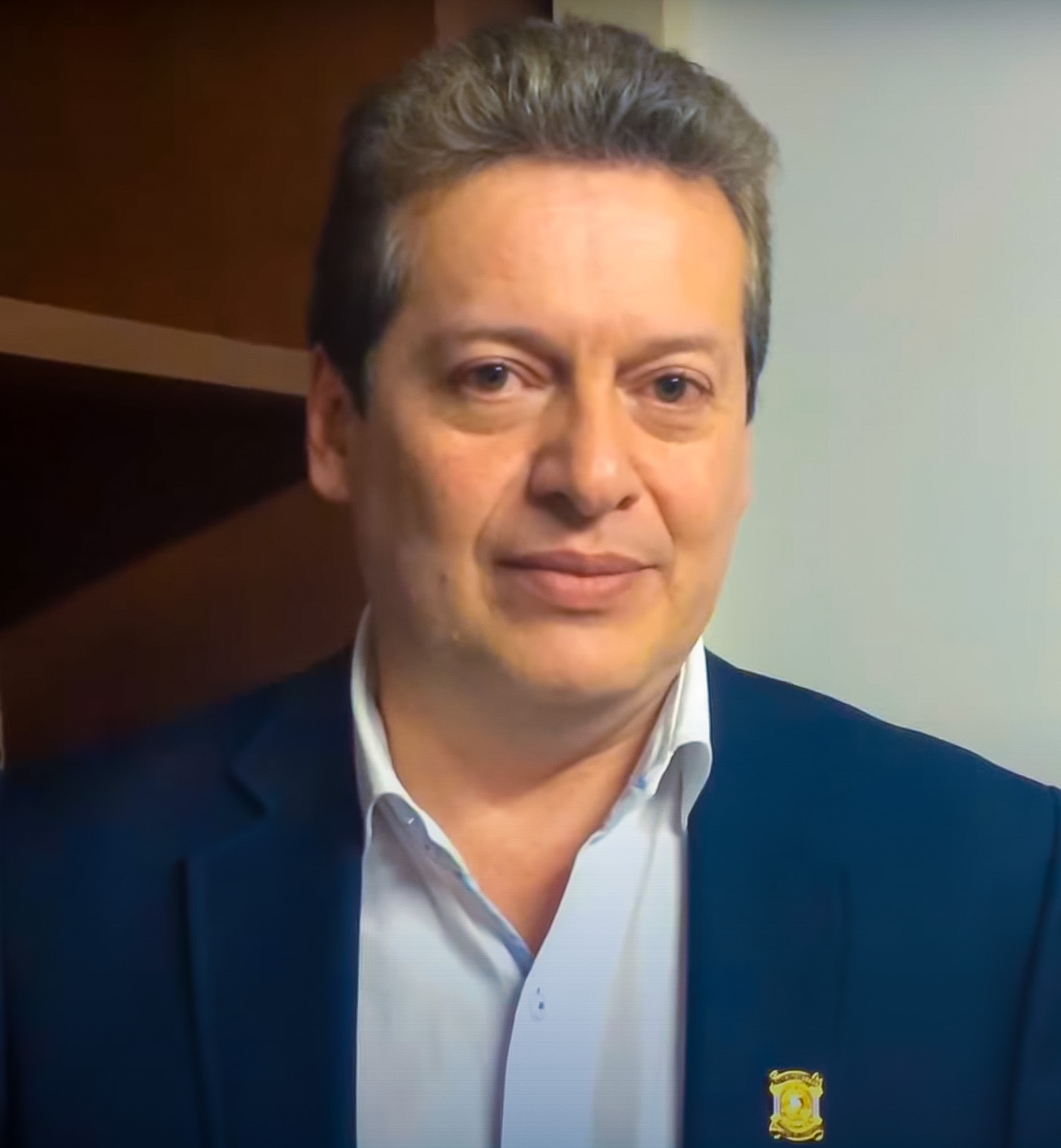

Member of the Chamber of Representatives of Colombia
- In office July 20, 2014 – July 20, 2018

Personal details
- Born: November 28, 1960 (age 65) Bucaramanga, Colombia
- Party: Alternative Democratic Pole
- Education: Universidad Externado de Colombia

Alirio Uribe Muñoz (b. Alirio Uribe Muñoz in Bucaramanga, Colombia) is a Colombian lawyer and politician. Until 2018, he was the representative to the Chamber of Representatives for Bogotá of the Alternative Democratic Pole.

== Biography ==
Uribe Muñoz is a recognized human rights defender. Until before his inauguration as a congressman, he served as president of the José Alvear Restrepo group of lawyers. He was born in Bucaramanga, but from a very young age he has lived in the capital of the country where he studied law at the Catholic University of Colombia, he is also a specialist in Labor Law and industrial relations from the Universidad Externado de Colombia and in human rights from ESAP. He was a judge of the permanent court of peoples in ethical trials against foreign companies for violations of human rights.

In 2014 he ran for the House of Representatives of Colombia, which he was elected with 19,882 votes. In April 2018, he announced his support for the candidacy of the Humane Colombia politician, Gustavo Petro.
