= Dorina Hernández =

Colombian educator and politician (born 1966)

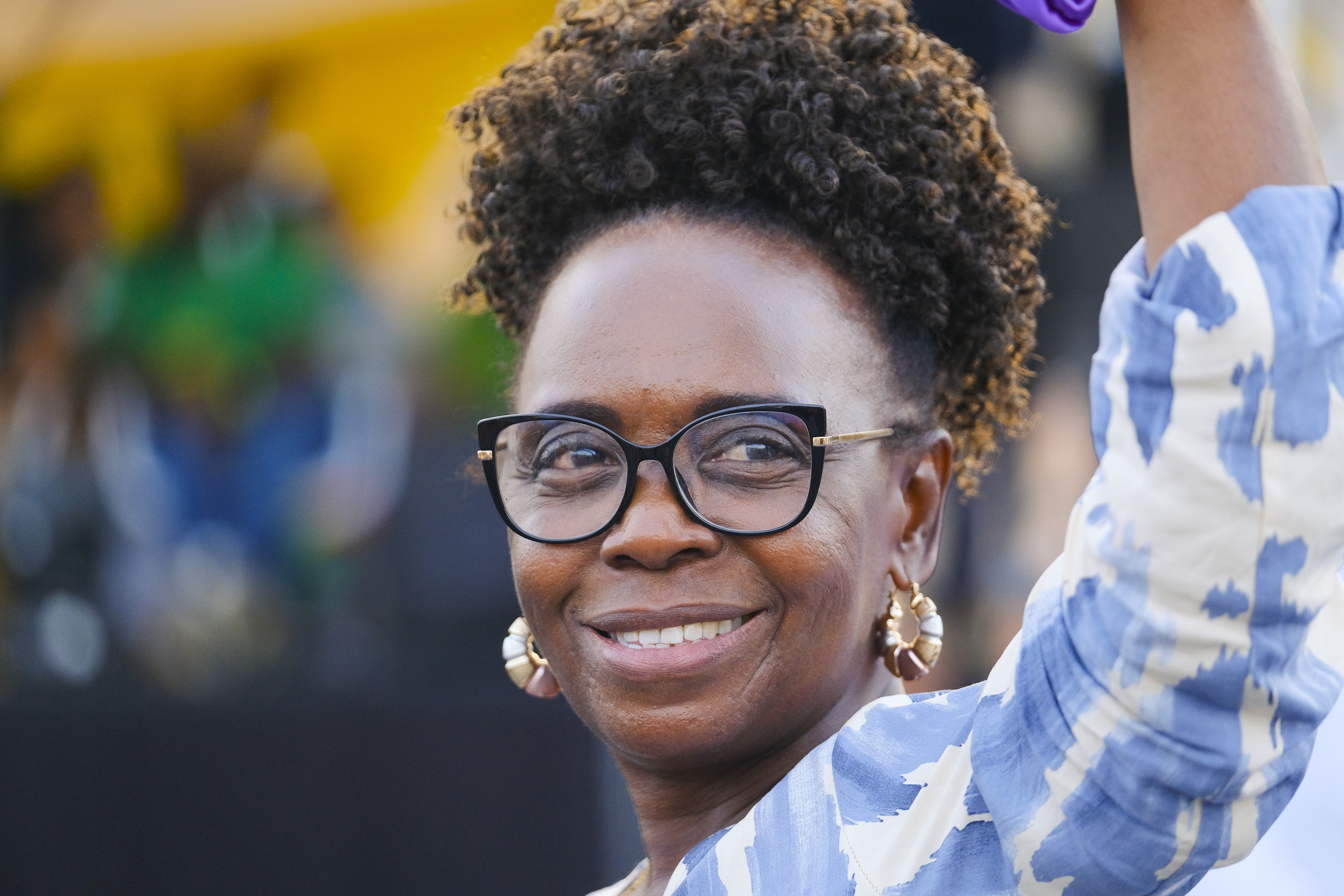
- Dorina Hernández in 2023.

President of Soy Porque Somos
- In office 22 December 2023 – 20 March 2025
- Preceded by: Position established
- Succeeded by: Vacant

Member of the Chamber of Representatives
- Incumbent
- Assumed office 20 July 2022
- Constituency: Bolívar

Personal details
- Born: Dorina Hernández Palomino; 23 July 1966 (age 59) Cartagena, Bolívar, Colombia
- Party: Soy Porque Somos (2020-present)
- Other political affiliations: Historic Pact for Colombia (2021-present)
- Spouse: Dionisio Miranda (m. 1998; died 2021)

Dorina Hernández Palomino (born 23 July 1966) is a Colombian educator, cultural manager, politician, and a member of the Chamber of Representatives. A member of Soy Porque Somos, Hernández is one of the highest-ranking members within the party. Hernández has served as an advisor to the Ministry of National Education and as President of Soy Porque Somos.

Born in Cartagena, Bolívar, Hernández led the quest for San Basilio de Palenque to be recognized as Oral and Intangible Heritage of Humanity by UNESCO in 2005. In 2022, she became the first Palenquera woman to be elected to Congress.
