= Permanent Representative of Colombia to the United Nations Office at Geneva =

Permanent Representative of Colombia to United Nations Office at Geneva
- Representante Permanente de Colombia ante la Oficina de las Naciones Unidas en Ginebra
- Incumbent; Juan José Quintana since 29 January 2014
- Style: His Excellency
- Appointer: Juan Manuel Santos Calderón
- Salary: CHF 11,780 (monthly)
- Website: Delegation's Website

The Permanent Representative of Colombia to the United Nations Office at Geneva is the Permanent Representative of the Republic of Colombia to the European Office of the United Nations and Other International Organizations at Geneva. The officeholder holds the rank of Ambassador Extraordinary and Plenipotentiary.

The Representative is Colombia's foremost diplomatic representative at the UNOG, and Chief of the Colombian Delegation to the UN in Geneva. The officeholder is charged with representing the interests of the President and Government of Colombia in relation to the missions of the specialized agencies, programmes and funds of the United Nations located at the UNOG.
