= Dilian Francisca Toro =

Colombian politician

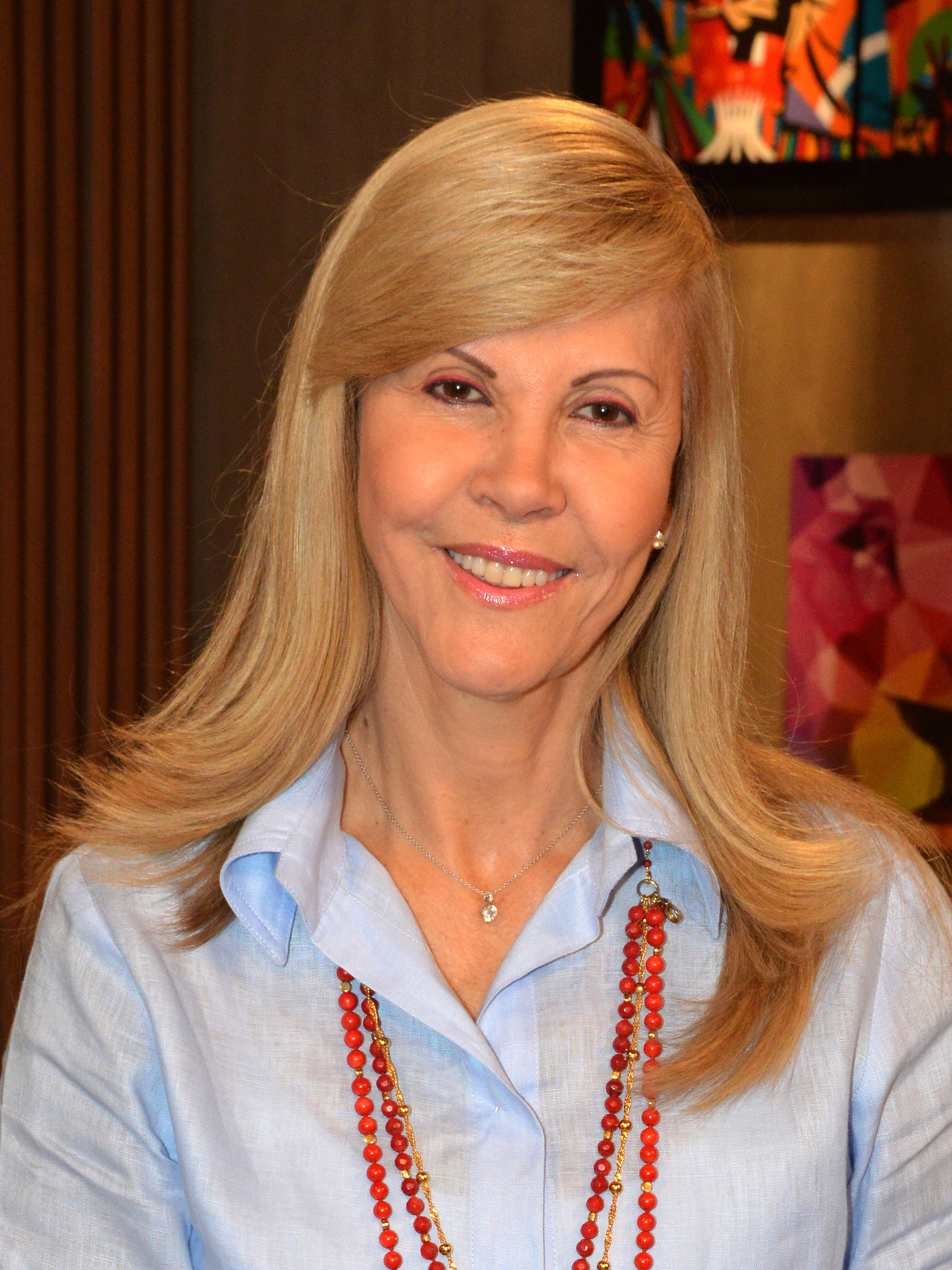

Governor of Valle del Cauca
- Incumbent
- Assumed office 1 January 2024
- Preceded by: Clará Luz Roldan
- In office 1 January 2016 – 1 January 2019
- Preceded by: Ubeimar Delgado
- Succeeded by: Clará Luz Roldan

Senator of Colombia
- In office 20 July 2002 – 18 February 2013

President of the Senate
- In office 20 July 2006 – 20 July 2007
- Preceded by: Claudia Blum
- Succeeded by: Nancy Patricia Gutiérrez

Personal details
- Born: Dilian Francisca Toro Torres; 6 January 1959 (age 67) Guacarí, Cauca Valley, Colombia
- Party: Party of the U (2004-present)
- Other political affiliations: Liberal (2002-2004)
- Spouse: Julio César Caicedo Zamorano (1996-present)
- Children: Julio César Caicedo Toro
- Education: Free University of Colombia; Federal University of Rio de Janeiro
- Profession: Rheumatologist
- Website: www.dilianfrancisca.org

Dilian Francisca Toro Torres (born 6 January 1959) is a Colombian physician and politician, she served as Senator of Colombia from 2002 to 2013. She was investigated by the Supreme Court of Justice of Colombia on charges of money laundering, and remained under preventive detention from 25 July 2012 to 1 August 2013 at the Police Centre for Higher Studies (Cespo) in Bogotá. She currently serves as Governor of Valle del Cauca Department.

== Personal life ==
Dilian Francisca was born on 6 January 1959, in Guacarí, Colombia. When she was 15 years old, she co-founded Casa de la Cultura of Guacarí, a non-profit cultural organization working with at-risk groups. She studied medicine at the Free University of Colombia, at Cali, where she graduated as Bachelor of Medicine, Bachelor of Surgery; she latter attended Federal University of Rio de Janeiro, in Brazil, where she specialized in Rheumatology.

Upon returning to Colombia, she was elected councilwoman for the Municipality of Guacarí, and in 1992 she became Mayor of Guacarí post which she occupied until 1994.

In 1996, she married former Senator Julio César Caicedo Zamorano in a religious ceremony officiated in the San Juan Bautista de Guacarí church, that same year she was named Secretary of Health for the Department of Valle del Cauca. Toro inherited the political support once held by the former liberal party leader in Valle del Cauca Carlos Abadía who was jailed as part of the 8000 process scandal, in which members of the Cali Cartel financed the political campaigns of numerous politicians including the presidential campaign of Ernesto Samper who resulted elected.

== Senator of Colombia ==
Toro was first elected to Congress as a Liberal Party candidate in the 2002 Legislative Elections receiving a total of 71,721 votes.

Because of her support for President Álvaro Uribe Vélez and his bid for re-election, Toro was sanctioned by the Liberal Party in 2004, which prompted to join a splinter group of Congresspersons from different parties who joined to form the Social National Unity Party and backed President Uribe.

In 2006 Toro was re-elected senator, and elected by her peers as President of the Senate of Colombia.

=== Presidential band incident ===
During the inauguration ceremony of President Uribe for his second term, as president of the Congress of Colombia, she became the first woman to ever administer the oath of office to the President of Colombia. There was a controversy however, Toro made a mistake and placed the presidential band backwards, with the Colombian flag colors inverted. When Toro was interviewed about this, she explained that "it was to bring good fortune to the new government... ...because you are supposed to wear your panties inverted for good luck".
