= Alexander López Maya =

Colombian politician (born 1967)

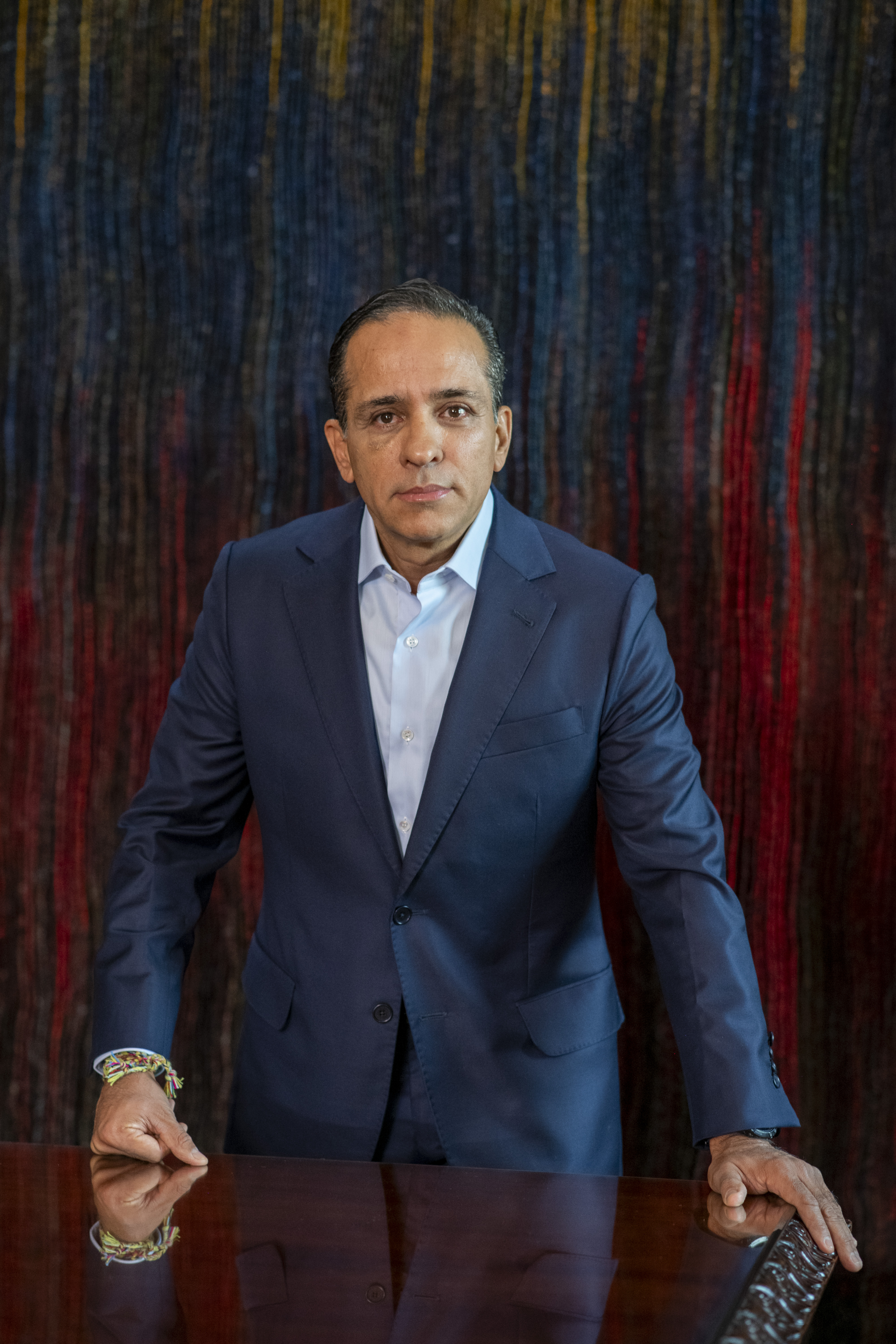
- Official portrait, 2024

General Director of National Planning
- In office 5 March 2024 – 13 February 2025
- President: Gustavo Petro
- Preceded by: Jorge Iván González
- Succeeded by: Natalia Molina

President of the Senate
- In office 6 June 2023 – 20 July 2023
- Preceded by: Roy Barreras
- Succeeded by: Iván Name

President of the Alternative Democratic Pole
- In office 27 March 2021 – 1 March 2024
- Preceded by: Álvaro José Argote
- Succeeded by: Vacant

Senator of Colombia
- In office 20 July 2018 – 1 March 2024

Member of the Chamber of Representatives
- In office 27 October 2011 – 20 July 2018
- Constituency: Cauca Valley

Personal details
- Born: Alexander López Maya; 13 June 1967 (age 59) Cali, Cauca Valley, Colombia
- Party: Colombian Liberal Party (1990-2002); Alternative Democratic Pole
- Other political affiliations: Historic Pact (2022-present)
- Education: Saint Bonaventure University
- Profession: Lawyer; Politician

Alexander López Maya (born 26 June 1967) is a Colombian lawyer and politician who has served as General Director of National Planning since March 5, 2024. López Maya has previously served as Member of the Chamber of Representatives from 2011 to 2018, Senator of Colombia from 2018 to 2014 and President of the Senate from June 6 to July 20, 2023.

Since 4 May 2023, he has served as acting president of the Senate after the previous president, Roy Barreras, was declared double militant, for which he was forced to leave the position of president of the Senate.

Political offices
Preceded by Roy Barreras	President of the Senate; 2023	Succeeded by Iván Name
Preceded by Jorge Iván González	General Director of National Planning; 2024–2025	Succeeded by Natalia Molina
