= Bernardo Guerra Serna =

Colombian politician (1930–2021)

Bernardo Guerra Serna (1 December 1930 – 26 July 2021) was a Colombian politician who served as a Senator.
