= President of the Supreme Court of Justice =

Presiding judge of the Colombia Supreme Court of Justice

President of the Supreme Court of Justice of Colombia
- Seal of the Supreme Court of Justice
- Incumbent; Iván Mauricio Lenis Gómez since January 22, 2026
- Supreme Court of Justice of Colombia
- Style: Mr. Chief Justice (informal); Your Honor (within court); The Honorable (formal)
- Status: Chief justice
- Seat: Supreme Court of Justice of Colombia, Bogotá, D.C.
- Constituting instrument: Constitution of Colombia
- Formation: March 4, 1886 (140 years ago)
- Website: www.cortesuprema.gov.co

The President of the Supreme Court of Justice is the main judge of the Supreme Court of Justice of Colombia and the highest-ranking official of the judiciary of the Republic of Colombia Law 61 of 1886 of the Constitution of Colombia grants plenary power to the president of Colombia to nominate, and with the advice and consent of the Senate of the Republic of Colombia to appoint "Judges of the Supreme Court", who will serve until they resign, retire, be charged and convicted, or die. The existence of a president of the Supreme Court is explicit in the political constitution on August 4, 1886.

== Powers and duties ==
Among the responsibilities of the president of the supreme court are Acting as a court of cassation.

2. Judge the President of the Republic or whoever acts as him and the senior officials referred to in article 174, for any punishable act imputed to them, in accordance with article 175 numerals 2 and 3.

3. Investigate and try members of Congress.

4. Trial, after accusation by the Attorney General of the Nation, the Deputy Attorney General of the Nation or their delegates of the Prosecution Unit before the Supreme Court of Justice, the Ministers of the Office, the Attorney General of the Nation, the Defender of the People, to the agents of the Public Ministry before the Court, before the Council of State and before the courts; the directors of the Administrative Departments, the Comptroller General of the Republic, the Ambassadors and heads of diplomatic or consular missions, the Governors, the Court Magistrates and the Generals and Admirals of the Public Force, for the punishable acts that they are charged.

5. Take cognizance of all the contentious businesses of diplomatic agents accredited before the Government of the Nation, in the cases provided for by International Law.

6. Give yourself your own rules.

7. Other powers indicated by law.
