= Roy Barreras =

Colombian politician

The Honourable Roy Barreras
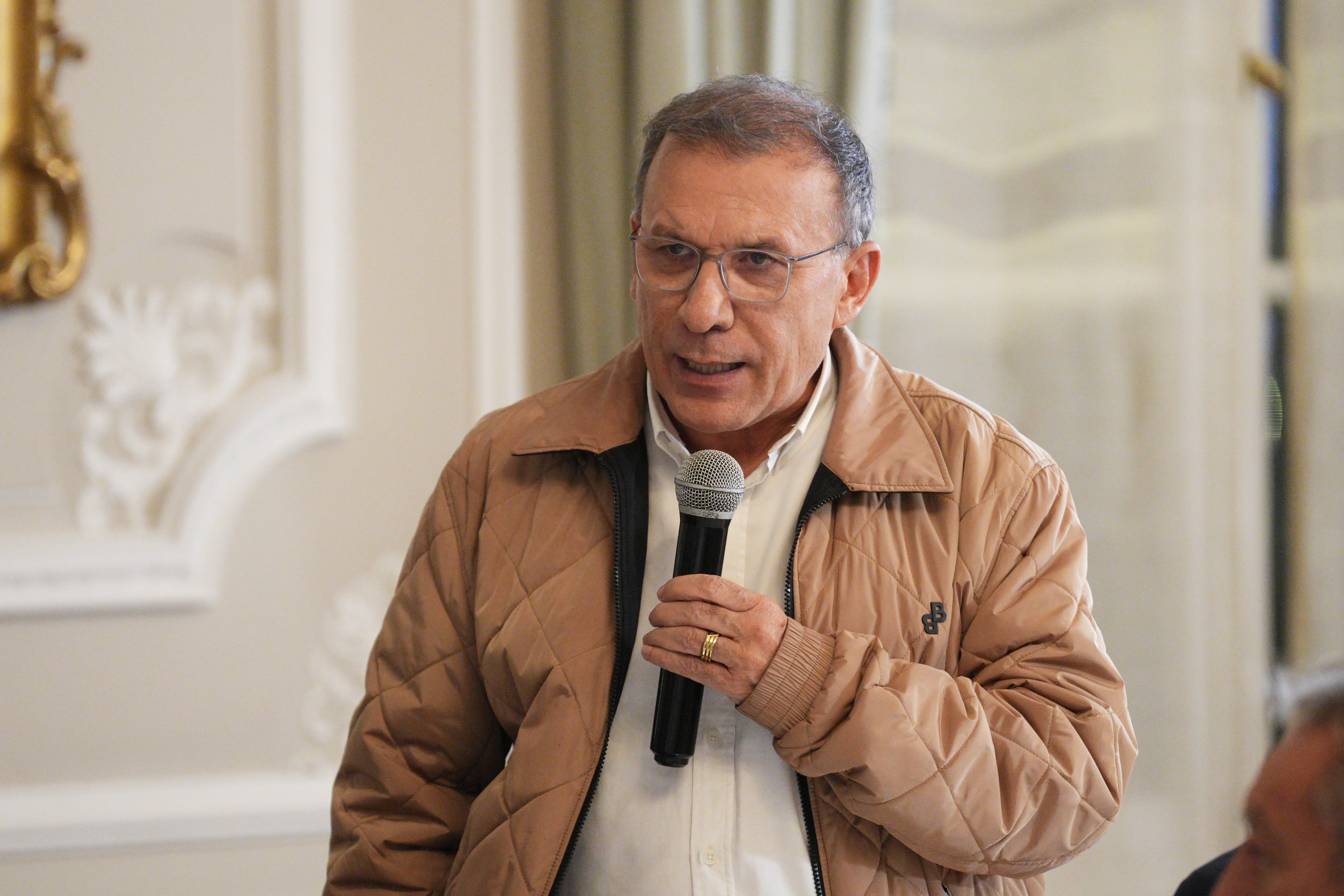
- Barreras in 2025

Colombian Ambassador to the United Kingdom
- In office 7 December 2023 – 29 April 2025
- President: Gustavo Petro
- Preceded by: Álvaro Gómez Jaramillo
- Succeeded by: Laura Sarabia

President of the Senate
- In office 20 July 2022 – 4 May 2023
- Preceded by: Juan Diego Gómez
- Succeeded by: Alexander López Maya
- In office 20 July 2012 – 20 July 2013
- Preceded by: Juan Manuel Corzo
- Succeeded by: Juan Fernando Cristo

Senator of Colombia
- In office 20 July 2010 – 4 May 2023

Member of the Chamber of Representatives
- In office 20 July 2006 – 20 July 2010
- Constituency: Cauca Valley

Personal details
- Born: Roy Leonardo Barreras Montealegre; 27 November 1963 (age 62) Cali, Cauca Valley, Colombia
- Party: Peace Force (since 2022)
- Other political affiliations: Liberal Party (2000–2006); Radical Change (2006–2009); Union Party for the People (2009–2020); Broad Democratic Alliance (2021–2022)
- Spouse: Claudia González (m. 2023)
- Children: 5
- Education: University of Valle; Universidad Nacional de Colombia; Alfonso X El Sabio University
- Profession: Medical doctor Politician

Roy Leonardo Barreras Montealegre (born 27 November 1963) is a Colombian politician and 2018 presidential candidate, he had served as senator from 2010 to 2023 and President of the Senate of Colombia from July 2022 to May 2023. In addition to senator, Barreras served as chairman of former governing party, the Union Party for the People. He entered politics in 2006 when he was elected as a member of the Chamber of Representatives.

== Early life ==
Roy Barreras was born into a humble family in Cali, Colombia. His grandparents were from Spain, and fled to Colombia during the Spanish Civil War. His mother was from the countryside, her own family displaced during the Colombian conflict, and his father a medical doctor who was forced to travel far from home for extended periods as part of his profession. Barreras struggled during his childhood with bullying from his classmates, working odd jobs including as a taxi driver and an assistant in a bakery. He eventually followed in his father's footsteps and became a medical doctor, working for more than two decades in various parts of Colombia.

== Political career ==
Barreras was elected to congress for the first time in 2006, and has succeeded in each of his re-election campaigns since. In 2011, he was elected to head the congressional Peace Commission, and has been a strong proponent of the Colombian peace process. On 14 June 2017, Senator Barreras officially began his 2018 presidential campaign with a letter to constituents that was published in La Semana.

Barreras was a supporter of former Colombian President Juan Manuel Santos, also of the Partido de la U. Senator Barreras is considered a centrist, and his policy positions reflect his complicated upbringing. His reputation as a politician that is tough on crime has endeared him to conservatives (right wing), including tougher sentences for child abusers and stronger laws against drunk driving. He also has the support of liberals (left wing) for his advocacy for LGBT parenting and the rights of LGBT parents to adopt children in Colombia.

However, it is Senator Barreras' ardent support for Colombian peace process and Colombian President Juan Manuel Santos that have been his defining attributes as both a senator and presidential candidate. Barreras has accused those who oppose the peace process of being populists whose rhetoric could do lasting damage to peace in the country. Barreras lost in the first round of the 2022 presidential elections that eventually saw Gustavo Petro of the Historic Pact for Colombia party elected to the presidency.

== Allegations of clientelism at the Escuela Superior de Administración Pública ==
In August 2019, Pedro Medellín, then director of the Escuela Superior de Administración Pública (ESAP), filed a complaint with the Attorney General's Office regarding alleged clientelistic practices between 2016 and 2018. According to Medellín, over 1.2 trillion Colombian pesos were allocated through inter-administrative agreements with possible political influence.

Medellín claimed that Roy Barreras "was involved in ESAP" and that there was a political structure of coordinators operating even from the Tryp Hotel near the Prosecutor's Office bunker. Barreras denied the allegations, and no formal judicial rulings have been made against him.

== Controversies related to Coosalud and the healthcare sector ==
In October and November 2024, various media outlets and public health figures publicly linked Roy Barreras to an alleged corruption network involving the health insurance provider Coosalud, which had been placed under government supervision. The accusations suggested that Barreras used his political influence to benefit affiliated contractors through outsourced healthcare services. In particular, he was allegedly close to physician and entrepreneur Mario Andrés Urán, who was involved in creating provider companies that received inflated or fraudulent payments, diverting public healthcare funds.

According to the complainants, Barreras facilitated or promoted the awarding of contracts to these companies while holding significant political power in Congress. His name was mentioned in several interviews and opinion columns, which alleged political and financial ties between him and some of the individuals involved.

The scandal emerged as part of a broader investigation into Coosalud for the alleged diversion of more than 226 billion pesos to an offshore company in the Cayman Islands. Authorities identified a contracting network that operated through shell companies and financial triangulation schemes to siphon off public funds meant for healthcare services.

In response, in November 2024, Barreras filed a criminal complaint for libel and defamation, arguing that the allegations were false and part of a smear campaign against him. He denied having any employment or contractual relationship with Urán, as well as any direct or indirect involvement in the contracts under investigation. In public statements, he asserted that his name was being politically weaponized without evidentiary support and demanded public retractions from those who had implicated him.

== Investigation into alleged ties to smuggling ==
In March 2025, the Supreme Court of Justice of Colombia opened a formal investigation into Roy Barreras, then serving as Colombia’s ambassador to the United Kingdom, for alleged influence peddling related to appointments in the national tax and customs authority (DIAN). The investigation was triggered by a complaint from former DIAN director Luis Carlos Reyes, who alleged that Barreras submitted résumés found in the home of a known smuggler, alias "Papá Pitufo," and pressured authorities to appoint those individuals to customs posts in Cali and Buenaventura.

Justice Cristina Lombana summoned Barreras to give testimony on May 6, 2025. According to Reyes, Barreras told him, “Imagine how bad it would be if someone broke Messi’s legs,” comparing the DIAN director to the Argentine soccer star as a veiled threat if his recommendations were not followed.

Barreras denied the accusations, called Reyes a “liar” and a “showman,” and announced legal action against him for alleged false testimony.

Political offices
Preceded by Juan Diego Gómez	President of the Senate; 2022–2023	Succeeded by Alexander López Maya
Preceded by Juan Manuel Corzo	President of the Senate; 2012-2013	Succeeded by Juan Fernando Cristo
Order of precedence
Preceded by Cristina Pardo as former President of the Constitutional Court	Order of precedence of Colombia as former President of the Senate	Succeeded by David Racero as former President of the Chamber
