= National Planning Department (Colombia) =

- Departamento Nacional de Planeación

Agency overview
- Formed: 25 November 1958
- Headquarters: Edificio Fonade Calle 26 No. 13-19 Bogotá, Colombia; 04°36′46.43″N 74°04′18.55″W
- Annual budget: COP$209,603,669,881 (2012); COP$436,634,703,385 (2013); COP$343,561,100,800 (2014)
- Agency executive: General Director
- Child agencies: SSP; FNR; FONADE
- Website: www.dnp.gov.co

The National Planning Department (Spanish: Departamento Nacional de Planeación) is the executive administrative agency of Colombia in charge of defining, recommending and promoting public and economic policy.

== Mission ==
The National Planning Department has the mission of defining and promoting the establishment of a strategic vision of the country in the social, economic and environmental sectors through the design, orientation and evaluation of public policies in Colombia, the management and allocation of public investment, the definition of frameworks for the performance of the private sector and the realization of government plans, programs and projects.

== History ==
Chapter I, Article 3 of Law 19 of 1958 created the Administrative Department of Planning and Technical Services (Departamento Administrativo de Planeación y Servicios Técnicos), with the purpose of collecting, preparing, recommending and presenting information to the President to help carry out economic and public policy.

Law 19 also established the National Council on Economic Policy and Planning (Consejo Nacional de Política Económica y Planeación) as a council headed by the Administrative Department of Planning and Technical Services serving under the president to study and discuss the information presented by the Administrative Department, and to present it to the president for approval.

In 1968 structural changes were made to the Council and department, transforming them into the National Council on Economic and Social Policy (Consejo Nacional de Política Económica y Social, CONPES ), and the now National Planning Department. The new changes gave the DNP a more prominent role in the decision-making process and the establishment and direction of national economic plans.

== Presidential Development Plans ==
Starting in the 1970s, the DNP has elaborated economic plans with the purpose of establishment the direction of the National Economy with an emphasis in planning. These plans are made for each Presidential Term, with a clear plan for action in economic policy.

- Economic and Social Development - Alberto Lleras Camargo (1961–1970)
- Plans and Programs for Development - Carlos Lleras Restrepo (1969–1972)
- The Four Strategies – Misael Pastrana Borrero (1970–1974)
- To Close the Gap – Alfonso López Michelsen (1974–1978)
- National Integration – Julio César Turbay Ayala (1978–1982)
- Change with Equity – Belisario Betancur Cuartas (1982–1986)
- Social Economy – Virgilio Barco Vargas (1986–1990)
- The Peaceful Revolution – César Gaviria Trujillo (1990–1994)
- The Social Jump – Ernesto Samper Pizano (1994–1998)
- Change to Build Peace – Andrés Pastrana Arango (1998–2002)
- Towards a Social State – Álvaro Uribe Vélez (2002–2006)
- Social State: Development for All – Álvaro Uribe Vélez (2006–2010)
- Prosperity For All - Juan Manuel Santos Calderón (2010–2014)
