= Governor of Valle del Cauca Department =

Flag of Valle del Cauca.

The governor of Valle del Cauca (Spanish: Gobernador del Valle del Cauca) is the maximum administrative and political authority in the Valle del Cauca Department of Colombia. This political official is elected by popular vote by means of a simple majority system and for a period of four years. The current governor of Valle del Cauca is Dilian Francisca Toro.

Decree number 340 of April 16, 1910 divided the Colombian territory into 13 departments, whereby the former departments of Cartago, Buga and Cali were combined to form a single one with the name of "Valle del Cauca Department". In this same decree the city of Santiago de Cali was appointed the departmental capital.

According to the Constitution of 1991, the exercise of the executive power in this region of the country is vested in one individual, named "Governor of the Valle del Cauca Department", elected by popular vote since 1991 (previously appointed by the President of the Republic), for a period of four years without immediate reelection. Mandate will start every January 1 following the election year.

== Vision ==
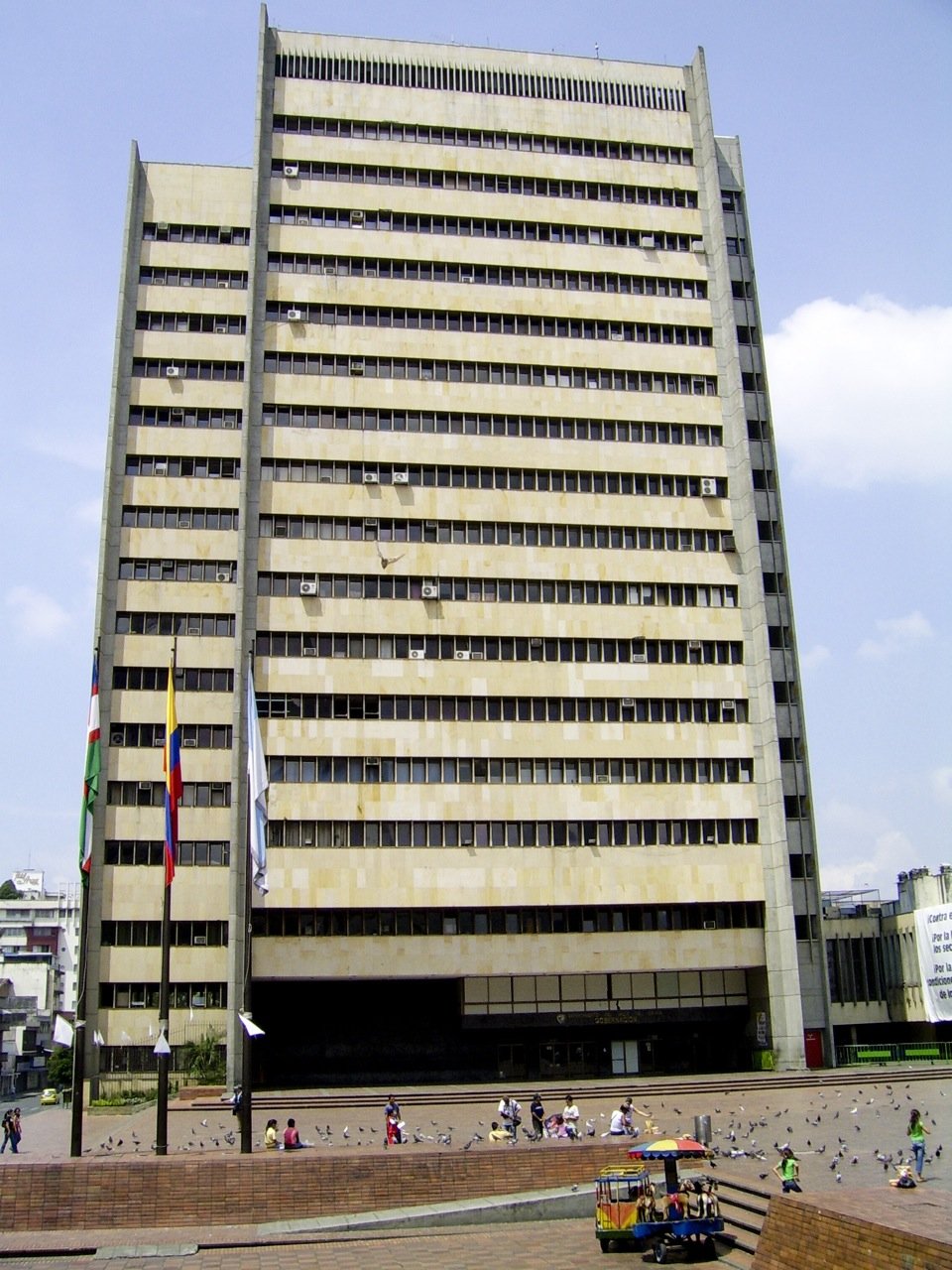
The Palacio de San Francisco is the office of the Governor of Valle del Cauca Department

1. Defend and responsibly and transparently administer the public patrimony and the public management for the common good and service.
2. Acknowledge the differences and respect of diversity as a condition for the development of society.
3. Govern based on dialogue, consultation, participation and the social responsibility with the different sectors of society.
4. Develop solidarity and social justice as fundamental principles of democracy so that human beings are first.
5. Develop a democratic culture, peaceful, of reconciliation and respect for human rights and the environment.
6. Government management focused on contributing to the protection of children and equality of men and women.
7. Govern with municipalities through social agreements that favor the population and institutional recognition to those who help the government improve.
8. Defend and promote historic, cultural legacy and sense of ownership for the Valle del Cauca people.
9. Strengthen the social fabric, industrial and political of Valle del Cauca.
10. Develop and strengthen of the regions; Pacific, mountainous, mountain steps, northern, central and southern of Valle del Cauca.

== See also ==
- List of governors of Valle del Cauca Department
- List of Colombian department governors
