= President of the Senate of Colombia =

Highest-ranking official of the Colombian Senate

- Seal of the Senate

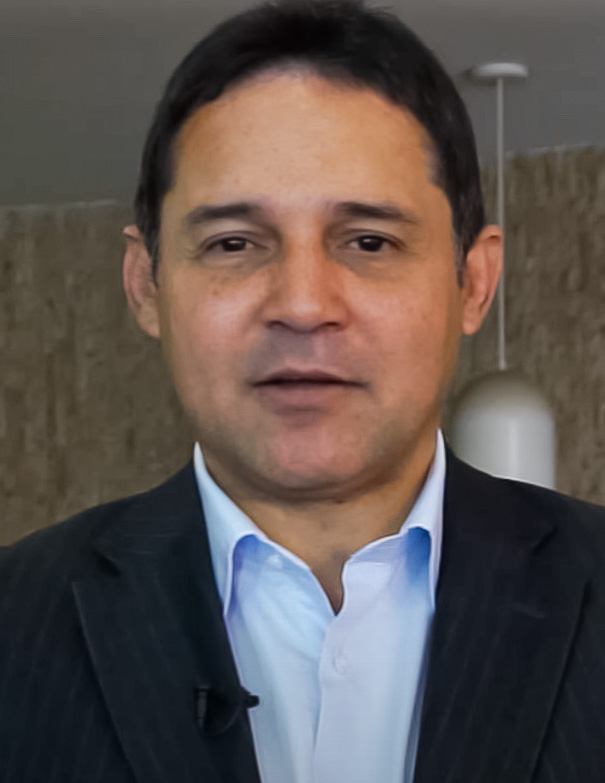
- Incumbent; Honorio Henríquez since July 20, 2026
- Senate of Colombia
- Style: Mr. President (when presiding); The Honorable (formal)
- Seat: Senate chamber, National Capitol, Bogotá, D.C.
- Appointer: Senate of Colombia
- Term length: One year, renewable once
- Constituting instrument: Constitution of Colombia
- Formation: March 4, 1789
- First holder: Francisco Antonio Zea as president of the Congress of Angostura
- Deputy: First Vice President; Second Vice President of the Senate
- Salary: US$193,400 per annum

The President of the Senate of Colombia is the leader of the Senate and the Congress of Colombia. The leadership of the congress is assumed by the person elected as President of the Senate of Colombia by members of the Senate in an election held every year on July 20. The President of the Senate serves a term of one year without a chance for reelection in which they also assume the presidency of Congress.

== Functions ==
=== Powers and leadership ===
As leader of the Senate (and Congress), the powers of the President of the Senate are a combination of procedural, administrative, representative, and institutional responsibilities, often described as the fifth most important position in Colombian politics. The President of the Senate is responsible for presiding over sessions and has the power to convene, open, direct, and close sessions within the Senate and, if necessary, in Congress as a whole. The President can also distribute bills submitted for consideration to the appropriate committees, organize their processing, and ensure that legislation advances through the corresponding stages. The president can institutionally represent the Senate (and Congress) before the other branches of government, foreign states and international organizations, both in diplomatic-parliamentary relations and in public acts.

== See also ==
- President of Colombia
- Vice President of Colombia
- President of the Chamber of Representatives of Colombia
