= María del Mar Pizarro =

Colombian politician (born 1988)

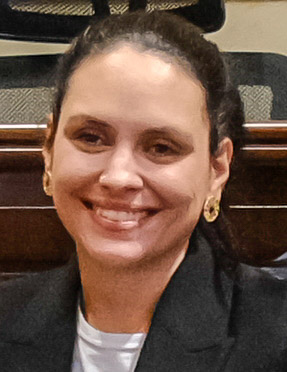
- Pizarro in 2023

Member of the Chamber of Representatives
- Incumbent
- Assumed office 20 July 2022
- Constituency: Bogotá

Personal details
- Born: 1988 (age 37–38)
- Party: Humane Colombia
- Parent: Carlos Pizarro Leongómez (father)
- Relatives: María José Pizarro (half-sister); Juan Antonio Pizarro (grandfather); Eduardo Pizarro Leongómez (uncle); Hernando Pizarro Leongómez (uncle)

María del Mar Pizarro García (born 1988) is a Colombian politician serving as a member of the Chamber of Representatives since 2022. She is the daughter of Carlos Pizarro Leongómez and the half-sister of María José Pizarro.
