= Francisco Mejía (disambiguation) =

Francisco Mejía or Francisco Mejia may refer to:

- Francisco J. Mejía (1869–1919), Honduran politician
- Francisco Mejía (born 1995), Dominican baseball player
- Francisco Mejia (general), Mexican general
- Francisco Mejia-Guinand (born 1964), American architect
