= Javier Delgado =

Javier Delgado may refer to:

- Javier Delgado Barrio (1932–2026), Spanish judge, president of the Supreme Court in 1996–2001
- Javier Delgado (Costa Rican footballer) (born 1968), Costa Rican football manager and former defender
- Javier Delgado (Uruguayan footballer) (born 1975), Uruguayan football midfielder
- Javier Delgado (Modern Family), fictional character on American sitcom Modern Family
- Javier Delgado, nom-de-guerre of José Fedor Rey (1951–2002), Colombian guerrilla leader
