= Action on the Maracaibo Castle =

Painting by José María Espinosa Prieto

Acción del castillo de Maracaibo
- Action on the Maracaibo Castle (English)
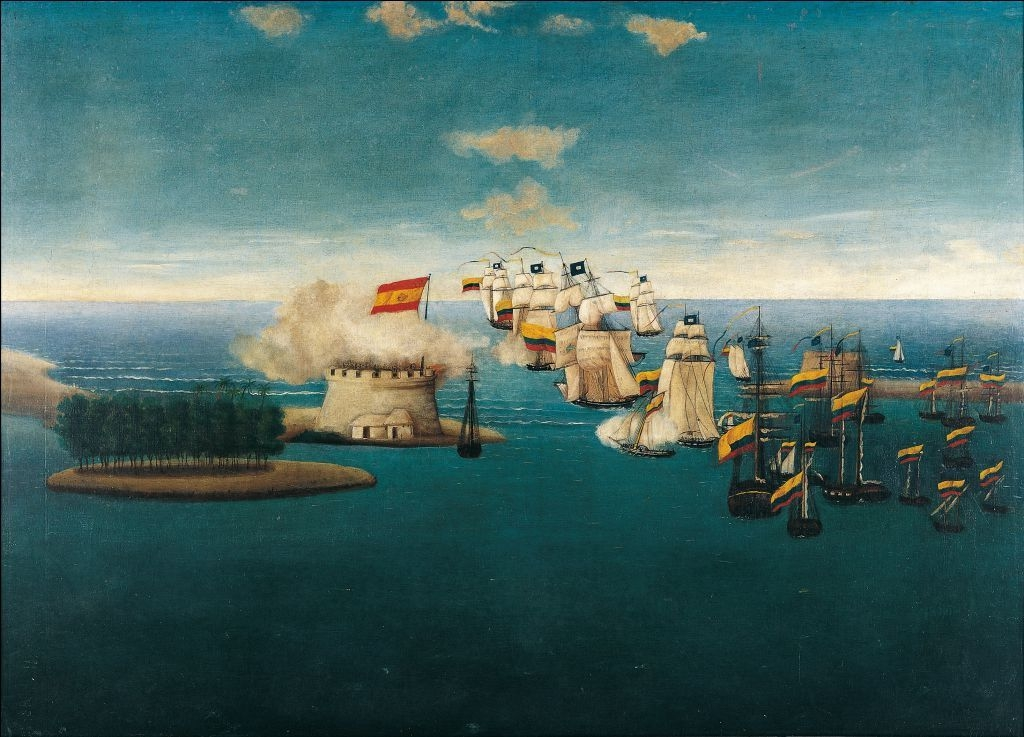
- Artist: José María Espinosa Prieto
- Year: c. 1840
- Medium: Oil on canvas
- Dimensions: 87 cm × 124 cm (34 in × 49 in)
- Location: National Museum of Colombia; Bogotá D.C.
- Owner: Government of Colombia

Action on the Maracaibo Castle (Spanish: Acción del castillo de Maracaibo) is a c. 1840 oil on canvas seascape history painting by Colombian painter Felipe Santiago Gutiérrez. It depicts an attack by a fleet of Gran Colombia Patriots against the Spanish Empire San Carlos Fortress during the Battle of Lake Maracaibo.

The painting is part of the National Museum of Colombia art collection in Bogotá.

== Historical background ==
The painting depicts the Battle of Lake Maracaibo fought between the Patriot government of Gran Colombia and the Royalist Spanish Empire on 24 July 1823. Led by José Prudencio Padilla, a fleet of topsail vessels manned by 1,195 Patriot sailors engaged the Royal Spanish Navy at Lake Maracaibo. The Spanish, who were led by Ángel Laborde, faced a direct front-line attack by the Patriot forces who were able to advance to the San Carlos de la Barra Fortress resulting in a decisive victory for the Patriots.

The battle is considered to be the culminating battle for Gran Colombia's independence as, less than a month later, the Royal Spanish government had departed Gran Colombia.

July 24, the day on which the Battle of Lake Maracaibo took place, is commemorated as Navy Day by both Colombia and Venezuela.

== Description and analysis ==
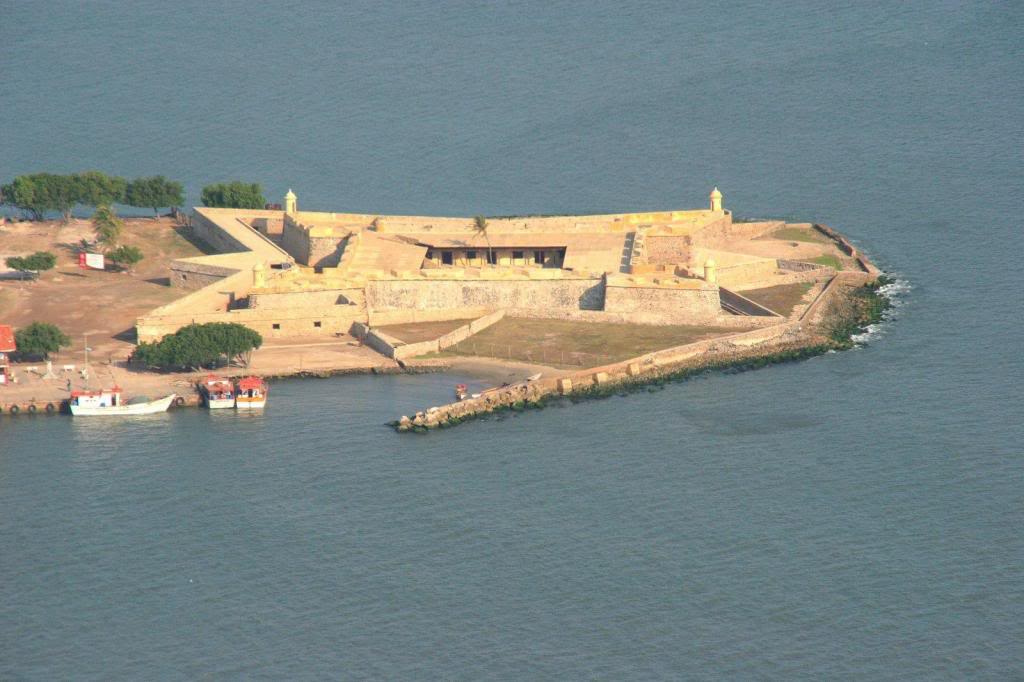
The San Carlos Fortress depicted as the Maracaibo Castle in the painting.

The flag of the Spanish Empire at the time in which the Battle of Maracaibo took place.

The flag of the Gran Colombia with coat of arms detail.

The Action on the Maracaibo Castle depicts the culminating events of the Battle of Lake Maracaibo which took place on 24 July 1823. The painting, which is a seascape history painting, was executed by artist José María Espinosa Prieto c. 1840. Prieto, who despite having participated in the independence battles for the Patriots, was not a direct witness to the events of the battle however he painted the scene from testimonies and geography maps to recreate the scene of the events.

One of the main subjects of the painting is the Maracaibo Castle, which in reality refers to the San Carlos de la Barra Fortress. The fortress, which is a Bastion type fortification, was built in 1623 near the mouth of Lake Maracaibo by the Spanish Empire mainly to fend against piracy in the area.

The other main subjects of the painting are the schooners, and other vessels, of all sizes firing against the fortress. At the time of the battle, Gran Colombia did not have a formal navy and it is assumed that it had commandeered and repurposed vessels to fend against the Spanish in the seas.

While considered to be one of the main naval battles in the war for independence in South America, Espinosa depicts the battle over a calm sea, under clear skies, and with smoke and opposing flags being the only indications of the conflict and thus associating the events of the battle to freedom, peace, and stability.

== Provenance ==
The painting has been recorded in the General Catalog of the National Museum of Colombia since 1917.

== Bibliography ==
- Madueño Galán, José María. EL COMBATE NAVAL DEL LAGO DE MARACAIBO. Madrid: Spanish Navy.
