= Francisco Mejia-Guinand =

American architect (born 1964)

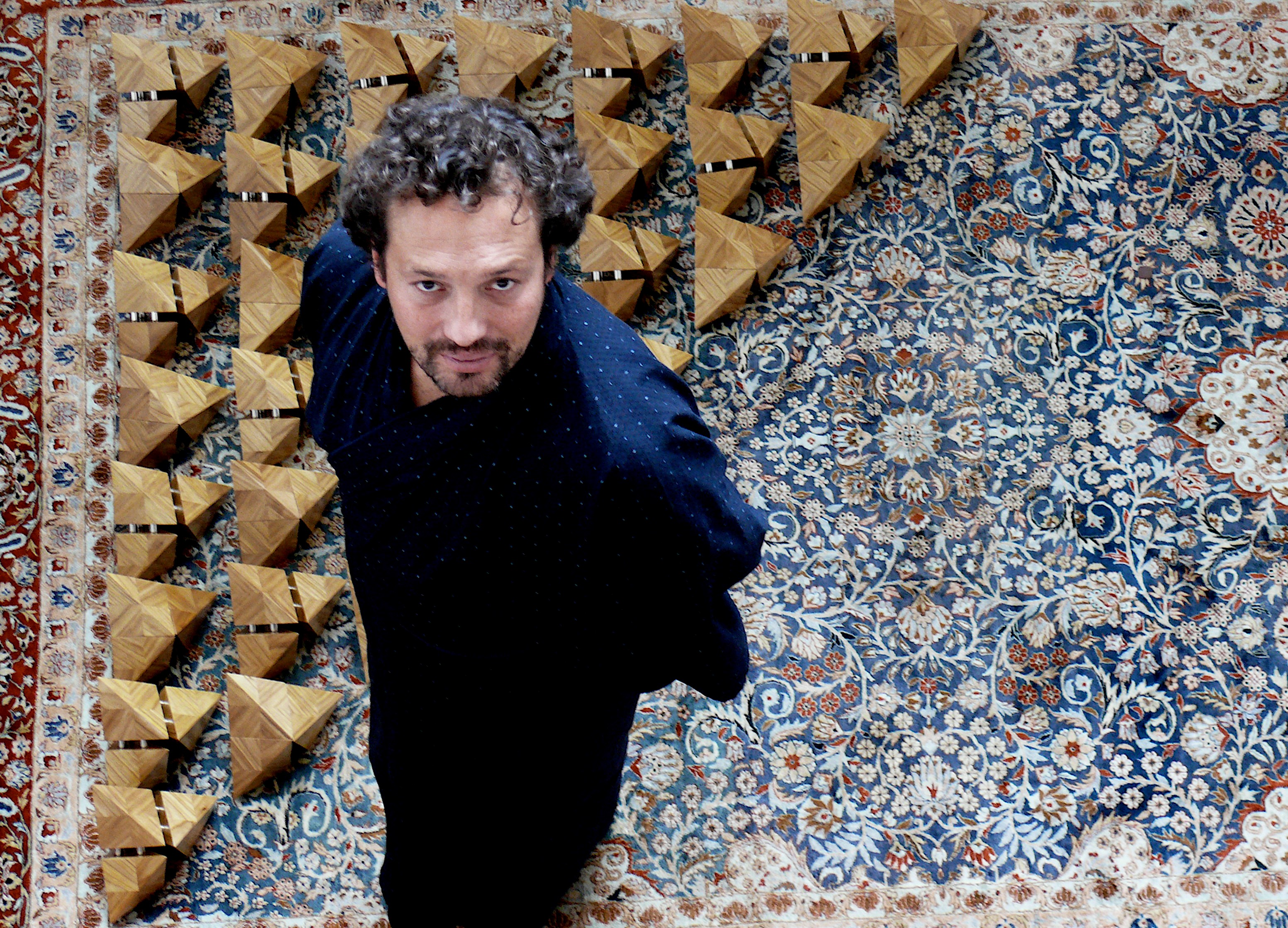
Francisco Mejia-Guinand

Francisco Mejía-Guinand (born 1964 Bogotá, Colombia) is a New York-based architect and visual artist.

Mejía-Guinand gained prominence in the 1990s as an artist who merged architecture with sculpture and painting.

== Background ==
Mejía-Guinand studied Architecture at the Faculty of Architecture and Design of the Pontifical Xavierian University, Bogotá. He received a Degree in Architecture in 1988.

Mejía-Guinand has taught in several Columbian Universities and has lectured at Museo Nacional de Colombia and Biblioteca Virgilio Barco.

Francisco Mejía-Guinand lives and works in New York and Bogotá.

== Career ==
Mejía-Guinand has spent his career examining ideas of abstraction and expanding his spatial and temporal approach to sculpture. In his work, developed in New York, he focuses primarily on arrangements of tetrahedrons systems. This highlight Mejía-Guinand's interest in balance and the contrast between positive and negative fractal space, and explores the mathematical notion of self-similarity and the idea of multidimensional geometry.

Mejía-Guinand is best known for his geometric sculptures based on mathematics, Russian Avant-garde, Sacred Geometry and Origami principles. His work incorporates bronze, aluminum, stainless steel, titanium, brass, copper tubing and cast aluminum and precious metals.

Mejía-Guinand's large-scale densely layered abstract oil painting are built up through layers of oil paint on canvas, then overlaid with mark-making using charcoal. His painting style displays the influences of Willem de Kooning, and Joan Mitchell.

== Exhibits ==
Mejía-Guinand's drawings, collages, paintings, sculptures and architectural models have been exhibited in numerous solo and group shows in Colombia, United States, Europe and Asia.

Mejía-Guinand's first solo museum exhibitions, "Francisco Mejía-Guinand the Order of an Inner World" was held in 2003 at the Art Museum of the Americas, Other Solo exhibitions include:

- "Francisco Mejía-Guinand, The Triumph of the painting" at The Embassy of Colombia at Washington D.C., March 25 April 24, 2015
- "Francisco Mejía-Guinand 's Geometrics Jewelry" at Latin American Art Gallery PROMO-ARTE, in Tokyo,

Mejía-Guinand's paintings are in the permanent collections of:

- Art Museum of Americas
- El fons d'art contemporani del Consell de Mallorca
- Es Baluard Museum, Palma de Mallorca, Spain
- MAMBo, Bogotá, Colombia.
