= María José Pizarro =

Colombian politician (born 1978)

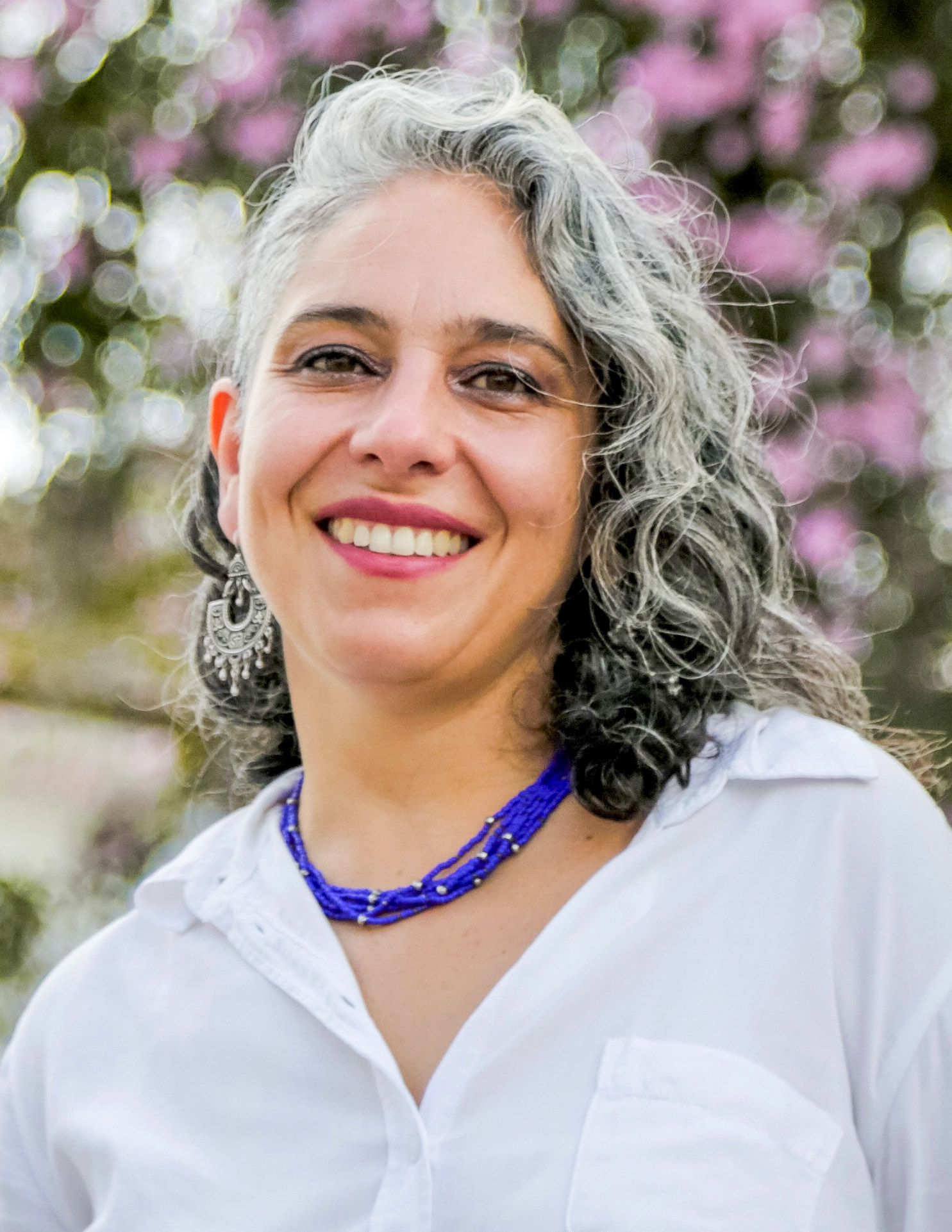

Vice President of the Senate
- In office 20 July 2023 – 20 July 2024 Serving with Didier Lobo
- President: Iván Name
- Preceded by: Miguel Ángel Pinto
- Succeeded by: Jhon Jairo Roldán

Senator of Colombia
- Incumbent
- Assumed office 20 July 2022

Member of the Chamber of Representatives
- In office 20 July 2018 – 20 July 2022
- Constituency: Capital District

Personal details
- Born: María José Pizarro Rodríguez; 30 March 1978 (age 48) Bogotá, D.C., Colombia
- Party: Historic Pact (2025-present); Humane Colombia (2018-2025)
- Other political affiliations: Historic Pact for Colombia (2021-2025)
- Children: 2
- Parents: Carlos Pizarro Leongómez (father); Myriam Rodríguez (mother)
- Occupation: Artist; politician

María José Pizarro Rodríguez (born 30 March 1978) is a Colombian artist, activist, and politician. She was a member of the country's Chamber of Representatives from 2018 to 2022, and has been a senator for the Historic Pact since July 2022.

== Biography ==
María José Pizarro was born in Bogotá on 30 March 1978, the daughter of Myriam Rodríguez and the former guerrilla and leader of the 19th of April Movement, Carlos Pizarro Leongómez; and niece of Hernando Pizarro who carried out the Tacueyó Massacre in Cauca.

During her childhood, she had to live in exile in Ecuador, Nicaragua, and France. She returned to Colombia when her father was a candidate in the 1990 presidential election, and went back into exile after he was assassinated. In 2002, she settled in Spain, studied design in Barcelona, and returned definitively to her home country in 2010.

A plastic artist who works in jewelry and audiovisual presentations, she held an exhibition at the Colombian National Museum titled Ya vuelvo: Carlos Pizarro, una vida por la paz (I'm Back: Carlos Pizarro, A Life for Peace). It was presented in Bogotá, Cali, and Barcelona.

She worked with the Secretariat of Culture, Recreation, and Sports of Bogotá from 2011 to 2013, and the National Center for Historical Memory from 2013 to 2017. She has also been an activist for peace and historical memory, in homage to the victims of the armed conflict in Colombia. She has dedicated much of her work to reconstructing the memory of her father. She compiled his letters and photographs in the 2015 book De su puño y letra.

So that the wars we have experienced are not repeated, we must always keep them in mind. I learned the importance of memory when I began to rescue my father's story.

== Political career ==
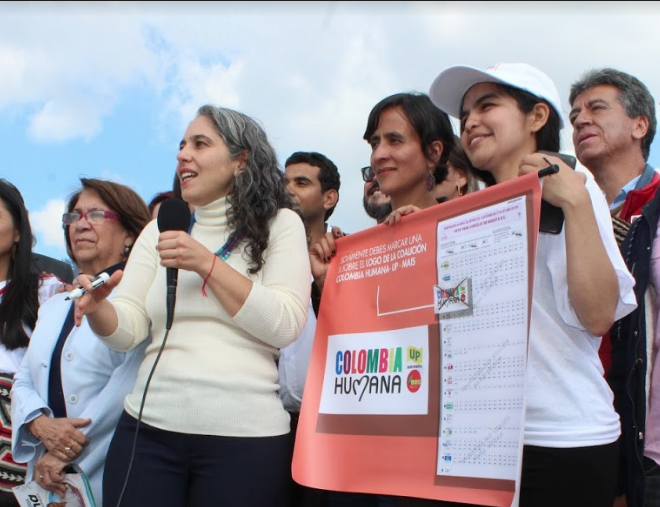
Pizarro supporting Humane Colombia's list for the Bogotá City Council – Susana Muhamad, Aída Avella, and José Cuesta

Pizarro ran for a seat representing Bogotá in the Chamber of Representatives in the 2018 parliamentary election, for the Decency List. She obtained the fourth highest number of votes, with 78,000. She was sworn in on 20 July of the same year.

She ran for senator in the 2022 parliamentary election, for the Historic Pact coalition in a MAIS party quota. She was elected, and took office on 20 July.

On 7 August 2022, in her capacity as a senator, she placed the presidential sash on Gustavo Petro at his inauguration.

Ahead of the 2026 Colombian presidential elections, Pizarro took a leading role in the presidential campaign of Historic Pact candidate Iván Cepeda.

== Works ==
- De su puño y letra (2015), Penguin Random House Grupo Editorial Colombia, ISBN 9789588806884
- Pizarro documental (2015), with Simón Hernández, produced by Señal Colombia

Senate of Colombia
Preceded by Miguel Ángel Pinto	Vice President of the Senate; 2023-2024; Served alongside: Didier Lobo	Succeeded by Jhon Jairo Roldán
