= Ricardo Acevedo Bernal =

Colombian musician and painter (1867–1930)

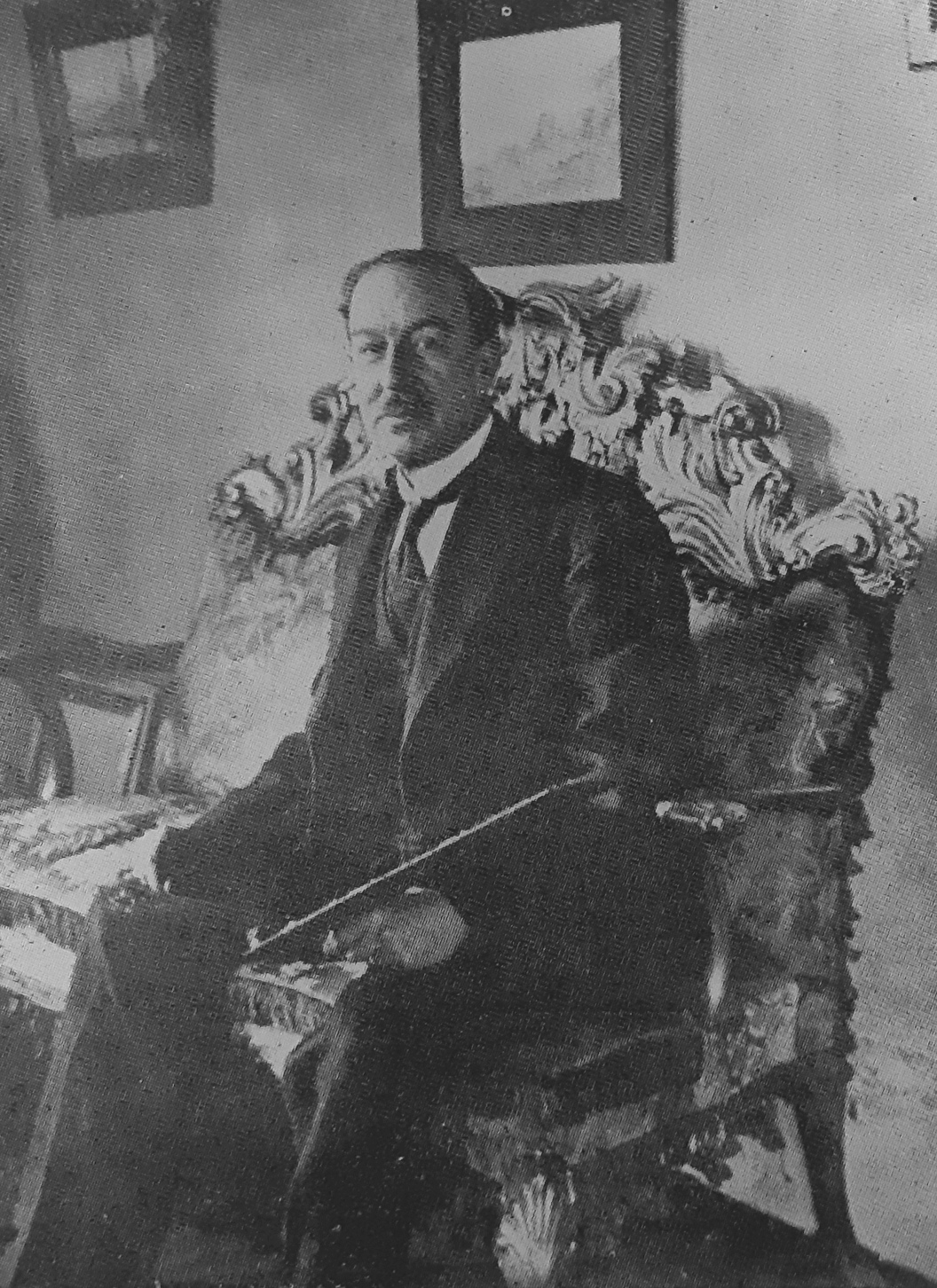
- Pre-1930 photograph of Ricardo Bernal
- Born: Ricardo Acevedo Bernal; 4 May 1867; Bogotá, Colombia
- Died: 7 April 1930 (aged 62); Civitavecchia, Kingdom of Italy
- Known for: Composer; Painter; Photographer
- Spouse: Rosa Biester de Acevedo
- Children: Inés Acevedo Biester: Rosa Acevedo Biester; María Acevedo Biester

Ricardo Acevedo Bernal (4 May 1867 – 7 April 1930) was a Colombian portrait painter, composer and photographer.

== Biography ==
He was born in Bogotá and attended the "Colegio Mayor de San Bartolomé", where he studied with Father Santiago Páramo, SJ (1841-1915), then enrolled at the Academy of Fine Arts of Bogotá, with Pantaleón Mendoza as his teacher. Later, he went to New York and remained for eight years, working at various photography studios. While there, he became a member of the "Art Students League" and worked with William Merritt Chase.

He returned to Colombia in 1898, where he devoted himself to creating religious murals at several churches, became a Professor at the Escuela and established his own art school in 1901.

In 1902, he went to Paris to study at the Académie Julian with Léon Bonnat and Tony Robert-Fleury. Upon his return, he was awarded a medal at an exposition celebrating 100 years of Colombian independence. Between 1911 and 1918, he was the Director of the Escuela Nacional and founded the art gallery at the Museo Nacional de Colombia. In addition to his portraits of historical figures and current notables, he was also a lover of Colombian folk music and composed several pasillos.

In 1928, President Miguel Abadía Méndez honored him by giving him the title "Artista Máximo". The following year, he was appointed as the Colombian consul in Rome. That same year, he held his last showing at the Ibero-American Exposition. He died in Rome. In 1963, his remains and those of his wife were returned to Colombia.

== Selected paintings ==
Rosa Biester de Acevedo , 1905, oil on canvas, National Museum of Colombia, Bogotá

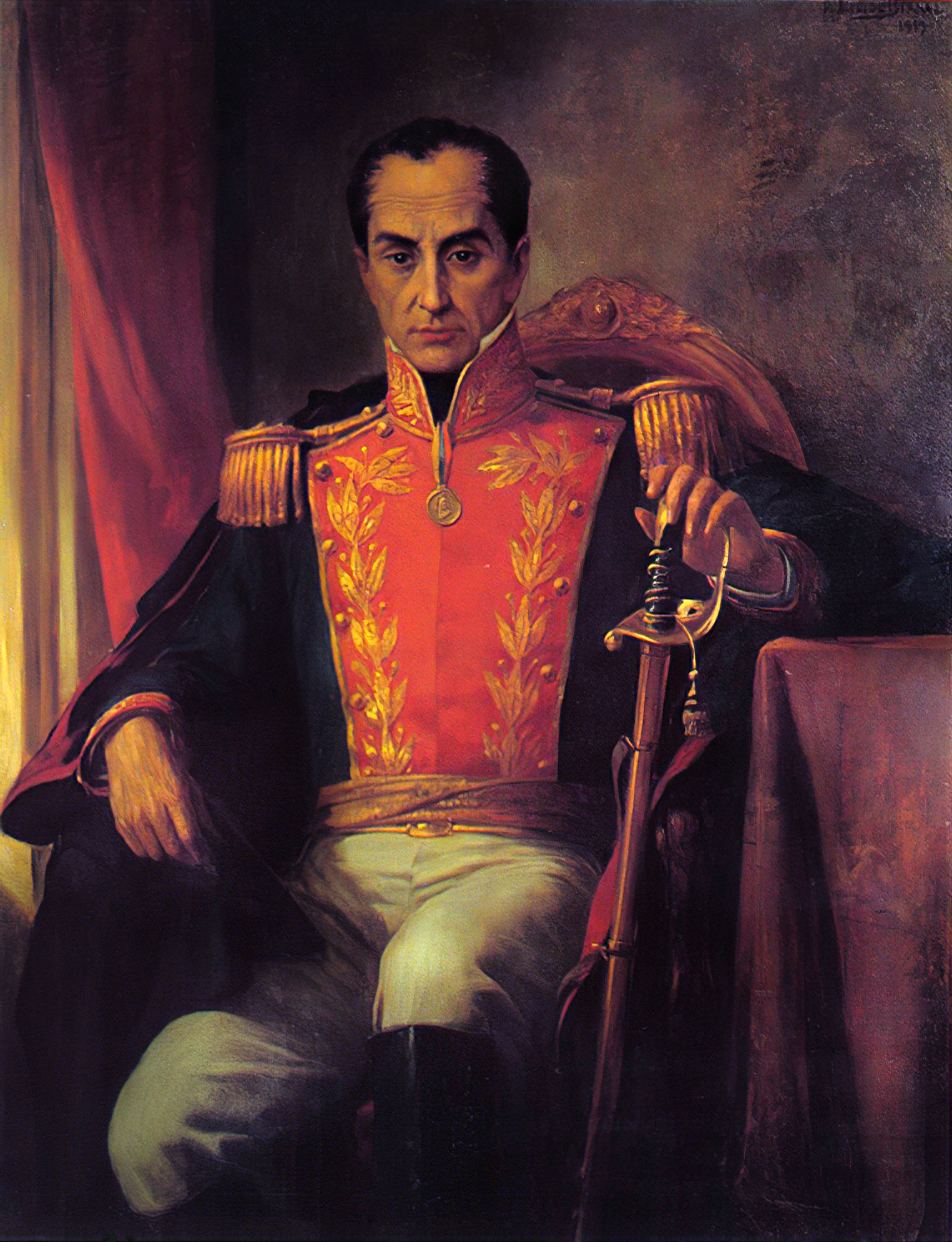
El Libertador Simón Bolívar, 1920, oil on canvas, Casa de Nariño, Bogotá
