= Santa Rosa de Viterbo meteorite =

Meteorite found in Colombia

Aerolito de Santa Rosa de Viterbo
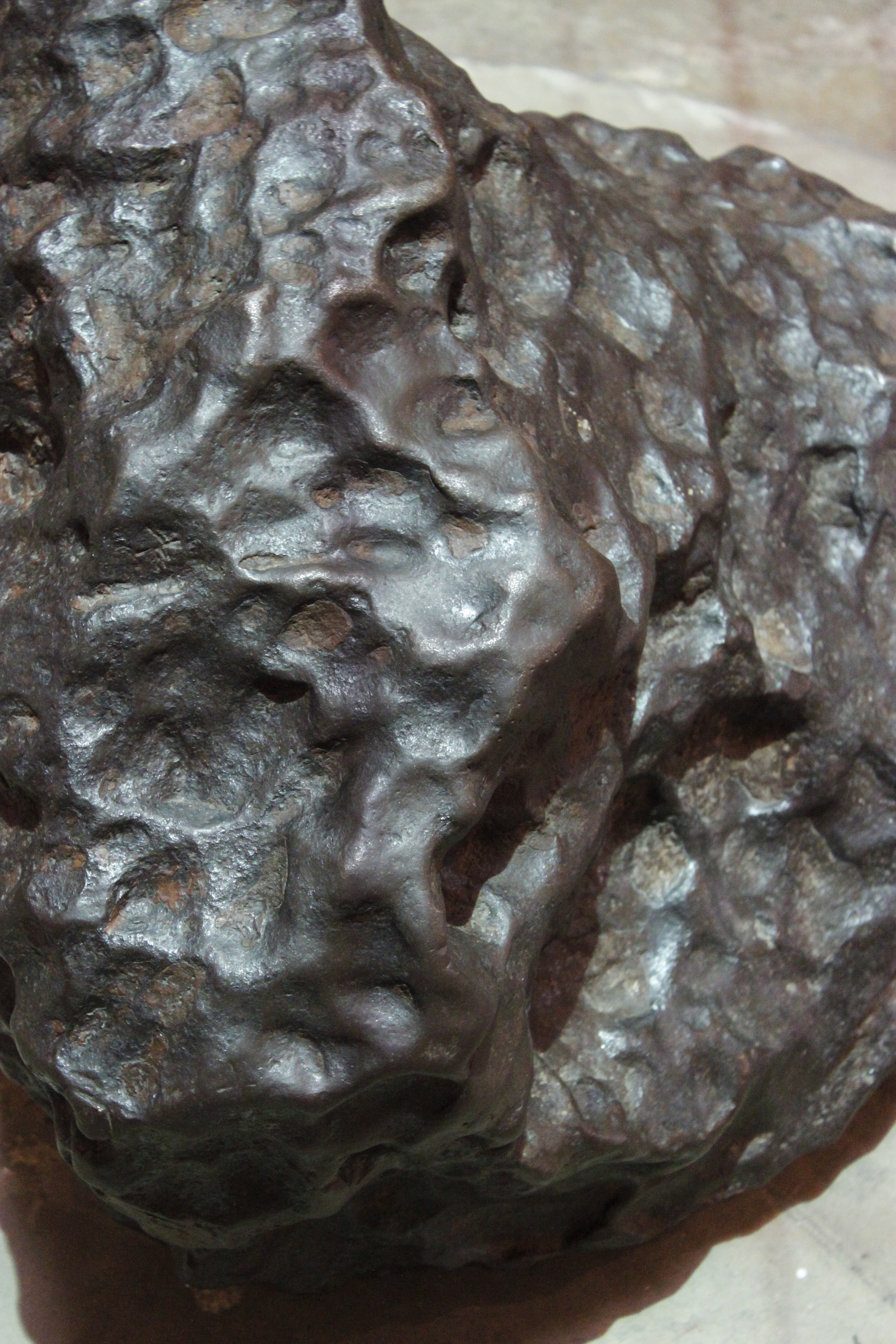
- A 411 kg fragment of the meteorite in the Colombian National Museum
- Country: Colombia
- Region: Boyacá
- Observed fall: No
- Found date: 1810
- TKW: >700 kilograms (1,500 lb)
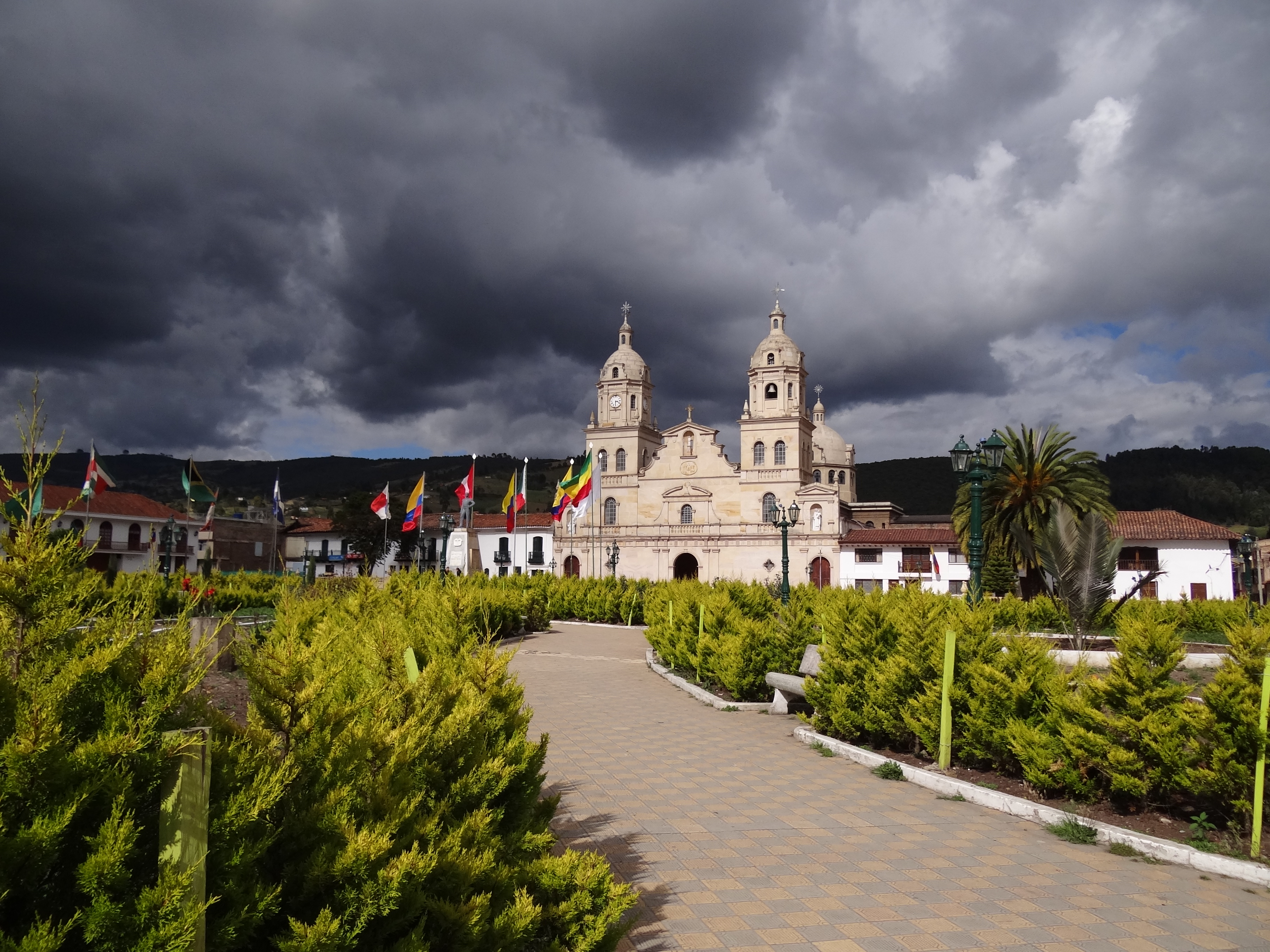
- Santa Rosa de Viterbo in north central Boyacá, the town of the meteorite fall
- Related media on Wikimedia Commons

The Santa Rosa de Viterbo Meteorite was found in 1810, in the Tocavita Hill, near the town that holds the same name in the north central area of Boyacá, Colombia.

== History ==
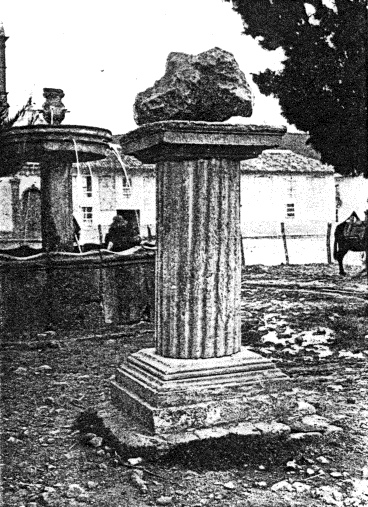
Meteorite being exhibited on the town's central plaza

In early 1810, on a Holy Saturday, a woman named Cecilia Corredor found the meteorite near the town on the Tocavita Hill. It was moved to the urban center of Santa Rosa de Viterbo, where it served as an anvil in the town's iron foundry for a long time.

In 1823, the mass was identified as a meteorite by the Peruvian mineralogist Mariano Eduardo de Rivero y Ustáriz and the French chemist Jean-Baptiste Boussingault, who saw it while traveling through the region.

On 8 September 1877, the town's mayor had the meteorite placed on a stone column and exhibited in the town's central park. During the presidency of Rafael Reyes Prieto, the meteorite was moved to Bogotá and was divided into two pieces; one piece was placed in the National Museum of Colombia and the other in foreign museums. Jesuits later found three more fragments of the same meteorite.

== Specimens ==
When the meteorite was first removed from Santa Rosa de Viterbo's main plaza and taken to Bogotá, it was divided into two pieces. One piece, weighing 411 kilograms, remained in Bogotá and was placed at the National Museum of Colombia, where it remains, while the other was taken abroad to be displayed in other museums. The other fragments found are curated mainly at the Pontifical Xavierian University, the National University of Colombia, and La Salle University.
