= Ricardo Franco Front =

The Ricardo Franco Command, the Ricardo Franco Front or the Commando Ricardo Franco was a Colombian guerrilla group led by José Fedor Rey a.k.a. Javier Delgado and Hernando Pizarro Leongómez. It began in 1983 when 200 hardliners split from the FARC.

Their base of operations was concentrated in southern Cauca in Colombia.

It was the most violent guerrilla group in the country. Its most notorious act was when the leaders order the brutal torture and executions of 164 of their own followers under the suspicion of disloyalty. This massacre led other guerrillas to consider the Ricardo Franco Front as an enemy organization. The two leaders of the group were later assassinated by FARC.
