= Hernando Pizarro Leongómez =

Colombian guerrilla

Hernando Pizarro Leongómez (Cartagena de Indias, 1959 - Bogotá, February 25, 1995), known as "Coroncoro," was a Colombian guerrilla fighter. He was the commander of the Ricardo Franco Command, the first dissident group of the FARC-EP. Together with José Fedor Rey, alias "Javier Delgado" or "The Monster of the Andes," he carried out the Tacueyó Massacre in Cauca. According to judicial investigations, 125 people were killed, although press reports from that time recorded 164 victims. Also known for being the brother of the commander of the 19th of April Movement (M-19) Carlos Pizarro Leongómez and uncle of senator María José Pizarro.

Gustavo Sastoque was condemned for his assassination, but apparently he was utilized as a scapegoat by members of the FARC
