= Carlos Pizarro Leongómez =

Former Colombian guerrilla (1951–1990)

- Carlos Pizarro Leongomez in 1990
- Born: Carlos Pizarro Leongómez; 6 June 1951; Cartagena, Colombia
- Died: 26 April 1990 (aged 38); Bogotá, Colombia
- Occupation: Militant in the FARC (1970-1973) Commander of M-19 Candidate for the presidency of Colombia (1990–1994)
- Successor: Antonio Navarro Wolff
- Political party: AD/M-19
- Children: María José Pizarro; María del Mar Pizarro

Carlos Pizarro Leongómez (6 June 1951 – 26 April 1990) was a Colombian guerrilla leader who headed the 19th of April Movement (M-19). Pizarro accepted the demobilization of M-19 that transformed the insurgents into a political party, the M-19 Democratic Alliance (Alianza Democrática M-19) (AD/M-19), but was assassinated on 26 April 1990 while running for president of Colombia.

He was the brother of Hernando Pizarro Leongómez who carried out the Tacueyó Massacre in 1985, considered one of the most brutal internal purges in the history of Colombian guerrilla movements.

== Early years ==
He was the son of a navy viceadmiral, Juan Antonio Pizarro García and Margot Leongómez Matamoros. Viceadmiral Pizarro García had been appointed general commander of the Colombian Navy during the administration of Gustavo Rojas Pinilla. He was later appointed as military attaché at the Colombian Embassy in the United States and representative to the Inter-American Defense Board, so the whole family moved in 1954 to live in Washington, DC. Upon their return to Colombia, and following the retirement of his father from active duty in 1959, they settled in the city of Cali. Pizarro studied in several high schools and a boarding school in Bogotá, colegio La Salle, where he graduated as Bachelor in 1968.

In 1969 he was admitted in the faculty of Law of the Jesuit Pontifical Xavierian University, a private university where two of his brothers were also studying law. There, Carlos Pizarro started becoming involved in political student activism following the events of May 1968. Pizarro was involved in the organization of the only student strike of the university, and soon joined the Juventud Comunista Colombiana (JUCO, Colombian Communist Youth of the PCC.). As a result of his activism he and his brother Eduardo were expelled from the University at the end of 1969. Later Pizarro-Leongomez entered the National University of Colombia, traying to recruit students for his project of urban "guerrilla" and participated in political left-wing activism with JUCO and PPC.

== The M-19 ==
By this time, the Revolutionary Armed Forces of Colombia (Fuerzas Armadas Revolucionarias de Colombia, FARC guerrilla) had been growing in power and influence and had adopted the communist ideology. The leaders of the FARC started thinking of switching strategies and bringing the armed conflict to the big cities, and members like Jaime Batemán Cayón started working on the organization of an urban guerrilla movement, and to do so started to recruit the members of the JUCO. Pizarro was among those who were contacted. He decided to move to the countryside without completing his studies or degree to engage in political and armed work. He enlisted in the Revolutionary Armed Forces of Colombia (Fuerzas Armadas Revolucionarias de Colombia, FARC) from 1970 to 1973..

During this period Pizarro's epileptic seizures caused by a traumatic birth worsened.

Pizarro and the young members of the urban front started to have differences and confrontations with the leaders of FARC who mostly disregarded them, and did not agree with their views. Following the death by gun squad of a fellow urban guerrilla Luis Alfonso Gil Ospina for contravening the orders of his guerrilla superiors, and the discontent with the hierarchies and political proyect of the FARC, Pizarro decided to desert FARC on September 11, 1973.

Back in the city he reestablished his contacts with Jaime Bateman, Álvaro Fayad "the Turk", Luis Otero Cifuentes, Vera Grabe, Iván Marino Ospina and other "guerrilleros". Bateman had been working towards an urban guerrilla movement since his days at the FARC, and together they decided to found the April 19 Movement (M-19), at the end of 1973.

The M-19 was an urban, nationalistic, Bolivarian guerrilla group. Following a media campaign that involved graffiti and enigmatic messages on newspapers, the M-19 conducted one of their first publicity actions on 17 January 1974, by stealing the sword of Simón Bolívar from the Quinta de Bolívar museum. The sword became the symbol of the guerrillas' war under the slogan of "Bolivar your sword returns to the war".

On January 31, 1991, Antonio Navarro, a leader of the M-19, returned the sword as part of the group's peace negotiations with the government.

== Arrest and amnesty ==
In 1979 Pizarro was arrested in Santander, after a crude attack of the army. He and several companions were taken to a military base where they were imprisoned and tortured.

Soon they were transferred to Bogotá, to "La Picota" detention center where other "guerrilleros" were being held. He remained in prison for three years. He and his companions were freed in 1982 at the beginning of the government of president Belisario Betancur, and after that, full amnesty was granted to them by majority in the Congress.

After the amnesty, Carlos Pizarro Leongómez continued his guerrilla armed activities insisting that the government should establish a dialogue of peace with new and extended benefits.

== Failed peace process ==
On 24 August 1984 the sign of the Agreements of Corinto, after an attack that suffered during an ambush of the army (next to other made its companion Iván Marino Ospina) he got hurt next to its companion. In spite of the intention to lay down the arms, Pizarro ordered new battles against the army after they also attacked his main amnestied heads or in truce and the camping in truce in Yarumales.

At the beginning of 1985 in quality of supreme commander, Pizarro announces defeat the truce and the resumption of operations of the guerrilla. On 6 November of that same year, Alvaro Fayad orders the taking of the Palace of Justice in Bogotá kidnapping to the magistrates of the high courts, the objective of the taking was the judgment of the president to fail to fulfill the Agreements of Corinto. The government ignoring the requests of the group orders the army to attack the building, without surviving the guerrillas nor the hostages who requested ceasefire and the respect to the life.

== M-19 leadership since 1978 ==
=== "America" Battalion and CNG (Coordinadora Nacional Guerrillera) ===
Pizarro became commander of M-19 in 1978, He was already part of the "Comando Superior" when they confirmed the death of Jaime Bateman (July 1983) through a written text with his authoriced and legal firm as part o the "Dirección Nacional" and "Comando Superior".(Darío Villamizar. Jaime Bateman. Bogotá: Planeta, 2002, El M 19 informa a Colombia el 14 de julio de 1983 la muerte de Jaime Bateman Cayón, pág. 430, 431, 432).

In November 1985, the year of the Palacio de Justicia holocaust, Pizarro was the movement's military commander and often credited with moving the group in a more military direction. In January 1986, from the Cauca Andes mountains, Pizarro announced the organization of the "America" Battalion which was composed of fighters from the National Guerrilla Coordinating Group (Coordinadora Nacional Guerrillera) (CNG) and foreign "guerrilleros" and fighters from other Latin American and european countries.

The "America" Battalion was to operate much like the CNG, but on an international level that would include fighters and militants from all over Latin America and the world. The group however, was unable to operate and consolidate due to deportation of suspicious foreigners in the Cauca Department.

=== AD/M-19 formation and death ===
After 19 years in operation, the group, commanded by Pizarro, began negotiating with the Colombian government, in April 1989, for demobilization conditional on certain grounds. The primary request of the group was a full pardon for all prior activities as well as the right to form a political party. M-19 in return agreed to turn over all weapons and not to return to violent activities, the demobilization date was set for mid-December 1989. The accord was signed in the town of Santo Domingo by Jaime Pardo Rueda, adviser to the president, Raul Orejuela Bueno, Minister of Interior and Pizarro, Commander of M-19.

Following the signing of the accord, M-19 announced Pizarro would officially run as the group's presidential nominee in the 1990 elections. He was assassinated shortly thereafter aboard an Avianca Airlines Boeing 727 plane flying from Bogotá to Barranquilla on April 26, 1990, by a young paramilitary member named Gerardo Gutierrez Uribe, aka "Jerry". Gutierrez Uribe himself was shot dead by Pizarro's security detail during the shoot-out. During the 1990 presidential campaign, three candidates were assassinated: Luis Carlos Galán, the leading Liberal candidate, Bernardo Jaramillo Ossa for the political party Unión Patriótica (UP), and Pizarro. Following the assassination, Antonio Navarro Wolff accepted the nomination of AD/M-19; he later finished third with 12.7% of the vote, losing out to César Gaviria who subsequently appointed him health minister.

Chief Prosecutor Alfonso Gomez would later charge Carlos Castaño, former leader of the United Self-Defense Forces of Colombia (Spanish: Autodefensas Unidas de Colombia) (AUC), for the deaths of Jaramillo Ossa and Pizarro on May 24, 1999.

== Personal life ==
Pizarro had a daughter, María José Pizarro, with Myrian Rodríguez in 1978. She compiled his letters and photographs in the 2015 book De su puño y letra, and later became a member of the Colombian Chamber of Representatives and Senate.

== Popular culture ==
- Carlos Pizarro is portrayed by actor Tiberio Cruz in the Colombian TV series Escobar, el patrón del mal as the character Diego Pizano.
- In the TV series Tres Caínes, Pizarro is portrayed by Rashed Steffen as the character César Navarro.

== See also ==
- 19th of April Movement
- History of Colombia
- Palace of Justice siege
- Politics of Colombia
