= San Carlos de la Barra Fortress =

17th-century star fort protecting Lake Maracaibo in Venezuela

Coordinates: 10.98620°N 71.60741°W

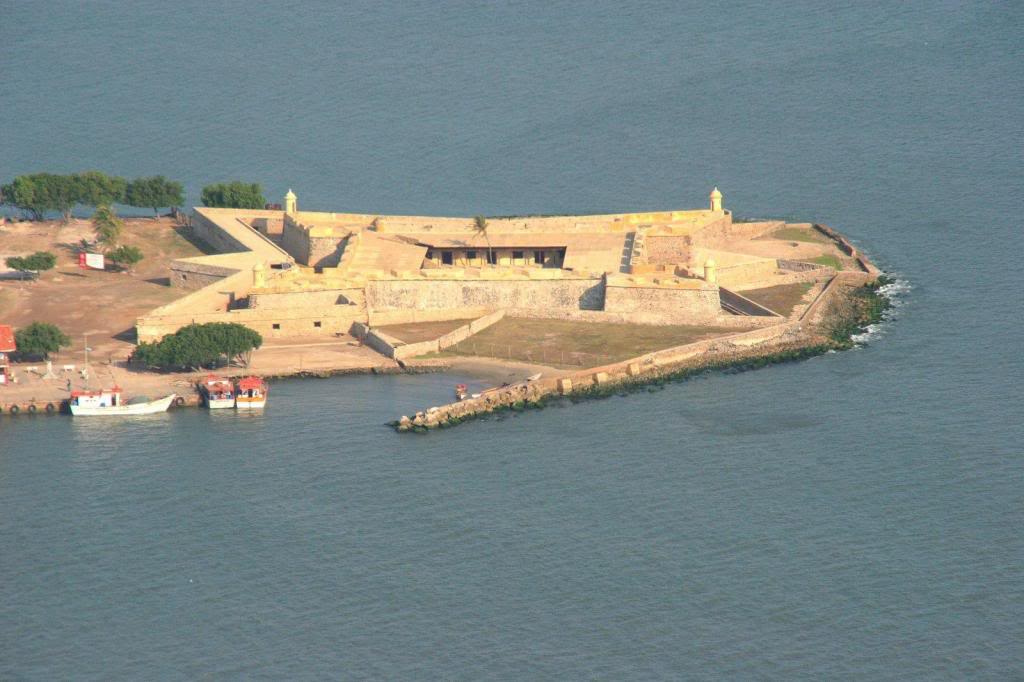
View of San Carlos de la Barra Fortress

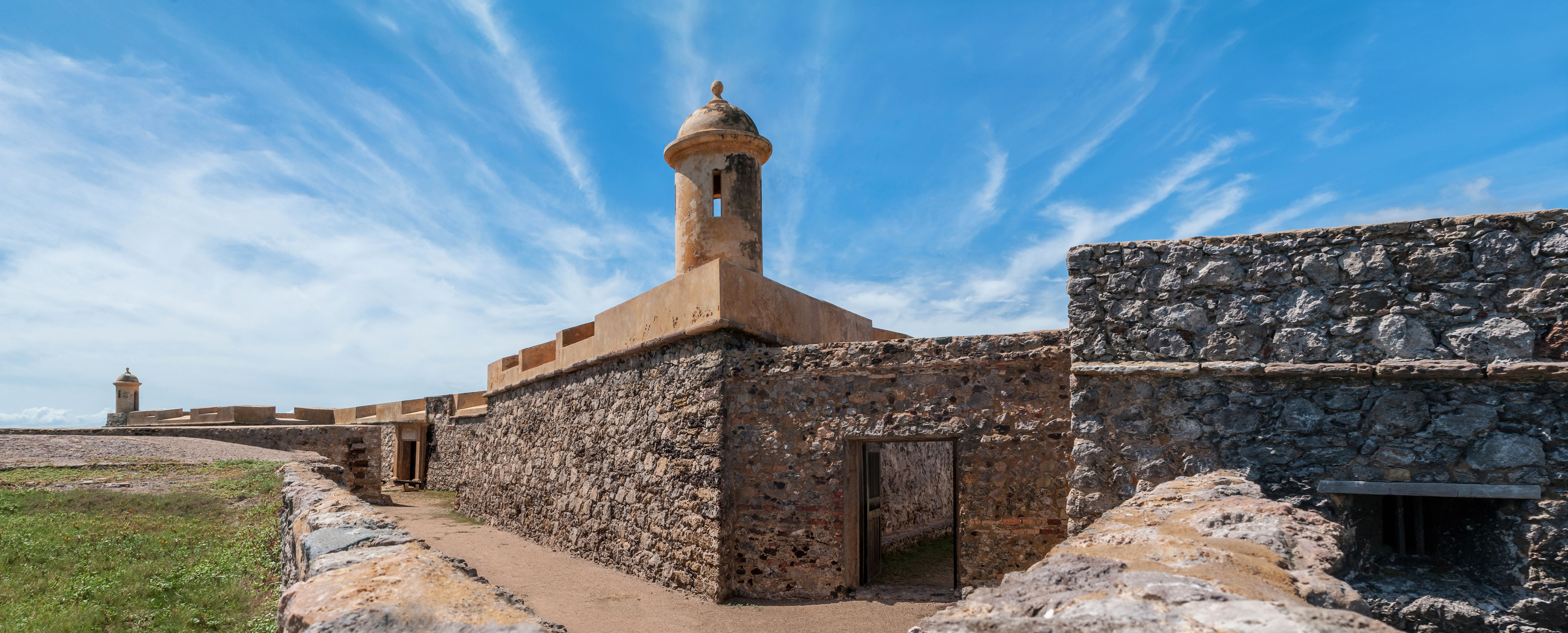
Bartizans

San Carlos de la Barra Fortress is a 17th-century star fort protecting Lake Maracaibo in Venezuela.

The San Carlos de la Barra fort is one of a number of coastal fortifications which the Spanish built in Venezuela in colonial times. It is located in the Peninsula of San Carlos, in Zulia state, Venezuela. It was built in 1623 with limestone rocks, brought from the Island of Toas, at the entrance to the Maracaibo bar. The purpose of the fort was to protect the pass that connects Lake Maracaibo with the Gulf of Venezuela. Prior to the fort being constructed, Maracaibo had been attacked and sacked several times by pirates and the castle was intended to provide a true defense of the town and surrounding area that would prevent incursions by pirates into the mainland.

== History ==
In 1666 the French pirate Jean David Nau El Olonés with a fleet of 8 ships and 650 men entered from the Gulf of Venezuela into the mouth of Lake Maracaibo where the Castle of San Carlos was located armed with 16 guns and attacked the fort. After an exchange of artillery, the pirates captured the fort in less than three hours. In March 1669, the town refugees took shelter in the fort during the sacking of Maracaibo by the British privateer Henry Morgan. Upon learning of the futility of escaping Lake Maracaibo by crossing the castle, Morgan tried to negotiate with the Spaniards by asking a ransom for hostages from the town. In response, Alonso de Espinosa, commanding officer of the castle, was given a large sum of gold and silver plus some cattle in payment, but Espinosa refused categorically to let them go. The next day, Morgan devised a trick to escape by simulating a ground attack on the site at night. The Spanish hurriedly abandoned the fort, while some soldiers remained in the castle attempting to block access back to the sea, without success. Morgan returned to Jamaica on May 14, 1669, under warnings from the English governor Thomas Modyford before claims of the misdeeds they committed were received in London.

In 1823, the fort was attacked and taken by a Venezuelan squadron commanded by Admiral José Prudencio Padilla, in what was known as "The Forcing of the Barra de Maracaibo" which also allowed the Venezuelan ships to enter the lake and attack a Spanish fleet in the Battle of Lake Maracaibo, the last battle in the War of Venezuelan Independence. After Venezuela achieved independence the fort continued to be maintained as part of the country's defences. It saw action in the Bombardment of Fort San Carlos when it was attacked by the Imperial German Navy during the Venezuelan crisis of 1902–03.

It also served as a prison, imprisoning such figures like included the writer Eduardo López Bustamante, who wrote poetry during his captivity.
