= Francisco J. Mejía =

Honduran politician (1869–1919)

Francisco J. Mejía (b. December 3, 1869, Olanchito, d. January 25, 1919, Tegucigalpa) was a Honduran politician.

Mejía studied law at the National University of Honduras. He then moved to Guatemala, where he worked as public notary for a few years. Returning to Honduras, he settled in La Ceiba where he founded the newspapers Pueblo and Patria. He wrote an essay on Honduran history, about the Facción de Olancho.

In 1903 he fought on the side of Manuel Bonilla.

In 1912, under the presidency of Manuel Bonilla, Mejía was named Secretary of State for War and Navy. He retained this post under the presidency of Francisco Bertrand.

Mejía emerged as a potential contender for the presidency of Honduras, but died in the midst of his presidential campaign. His vice-presidential candidate was Dr. Jerónimo J. Reina. At the time of Mejía's death, he held the post as Secretary of State for Governance and Justice.

The largest secondary school of Olanchito is named after Mejía.
