= Battle of Lake Maracaibo =

1823 naval battle of the Venezuelan War of Independence

Coordinates: 9.8158°N 71.5567°W

- Part of the Venezuelan War of Independence
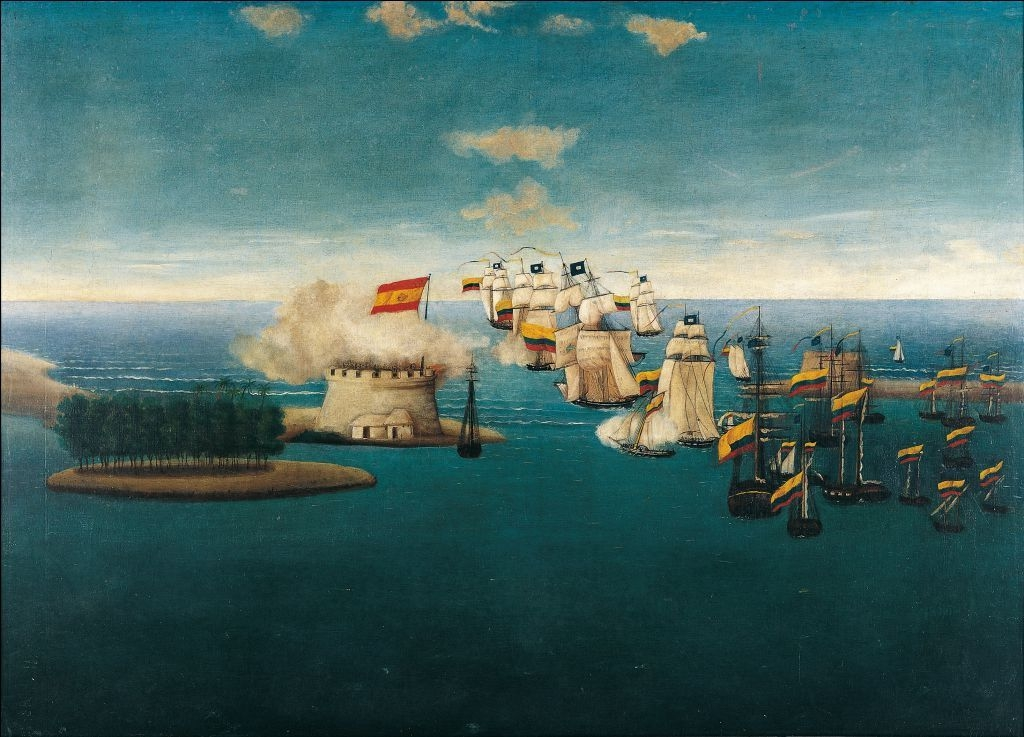
- Action on the Maracaibo Castle by José María Espinosa, c. 1840
Date	24 July 1823
Location	Maracaibo Lake, Venezuela
Result	Colombian victory

Belligerents
Gran Colombia	Spain

Commanders and leaders
(Gran Colombia) José Prudencio Padilla	(Spain) Ángel Laborde

Casualties and losses
44 killed (8 officers); 164 wounded (14 officers)	1 brig-schooner destroyed 437 captured (69 officers)

The Battle of Lake Maracaibo also known as the "Naval Battle of the Lake" was fought on 24 July 1823 on Venezuela's Lake Maracaibo between fleets under the commands of Republican Admiral José Prudencio Padilla and royalist Captain Ángel Laborde.

The engagement was won by the Republican forces, and was the last battle of the Venezuelan War of Independence and the larger Spanish American wars of independence. The Republican ships were part of the armed forces of Gran Colombia led by Simón Bolívar.

The Battle of Carabobo of 1821 is usually seen in the historiography as the culminating battle for Venezuelan independence. However, some historians point out that if the Battle of Lake Maracaibo had been a victory for the Royalist forces, the Spanish Crown might have been able to establish a new front in Western Venezuela from which to attack the Republican forces stationed in Venezuela. As a result of the defeat, the Spanish did not send any reinforcing regiments to Venezuela, and accepted Venezuelan independence as a result of this second decisive Republican victory. Spain did not formally recognise the new nation's independence for more than a decade afterward.

The 24 July is a regional holiday of Zulia State in Venezuela, and as it is the date of the birth of Simón Bolívar, is also marked as Navy Day in both Venezuela and Colombia.

== Battle ==
During this Naval Battle, the Republican squadron was led by Admiral José Prudencio Padilla against the Royalist forces commanded by Ángel Laborde. After three brief encounters with the Spanish squadron, the Republican fleet went to the port of Moporo, where they spent the first half of July without any major activities. On 17 July Royalist commander Laborde sent to Padilla an offer of friendship which was rejected. The following days were spent in feverish war preparations as the two commanders prepared their ships, gathered supplies, and trained their crews in anticipation of the coming combat.

On the afternoon of 23 July the Royalists moved to the west coast of the lake between Captain Chico and Bella Vista (north of Maracaibo) and anchored in line of battle. Meanwhile, the Republicans remained at sail until the evening, and using Los Puertos de Altagracia as background, placed all their ships in a parallel line to the east coast of the lake and subtly advanced toward Punta de Piedra.

At sunrise on 24 July, the Republican ship commanders were called to the brig Independiente where Admiral Padilla gave his final instructions for the battle, making some changes and – still not satisfied – at 10:30, went personally on board all the ships in the squadron, in order to harangue and excite his crews so that when the time came to attack the Royalists they would act with the utmost boldness and enthusiasm.

At 10:40 the wind veered to the northwest, and 10 minutes later the signal was made to prepared to sail, but with a lessening of the southward breeze the decision to raise anchor was postponed until it was affirmed the breeze was favorable, despite everything inviting an immediate attack on the Royalist squadron which was anchored in front in a line parallel to the coast and very close to it.

At 14:00 Padilla ordered the Patriot fleet to sail west to attack the enemy's northern flank. At 14:20, the signal to sail was given and at 14:28 they formed the front line to attack simultaneously all enemy ships head on. As the brig Mars was located on the windward side and the Independent to leeward, were providing the ride so that it is perfectly formed and follow the line of battle for the implementation of the plan that Padilla had been proposed.

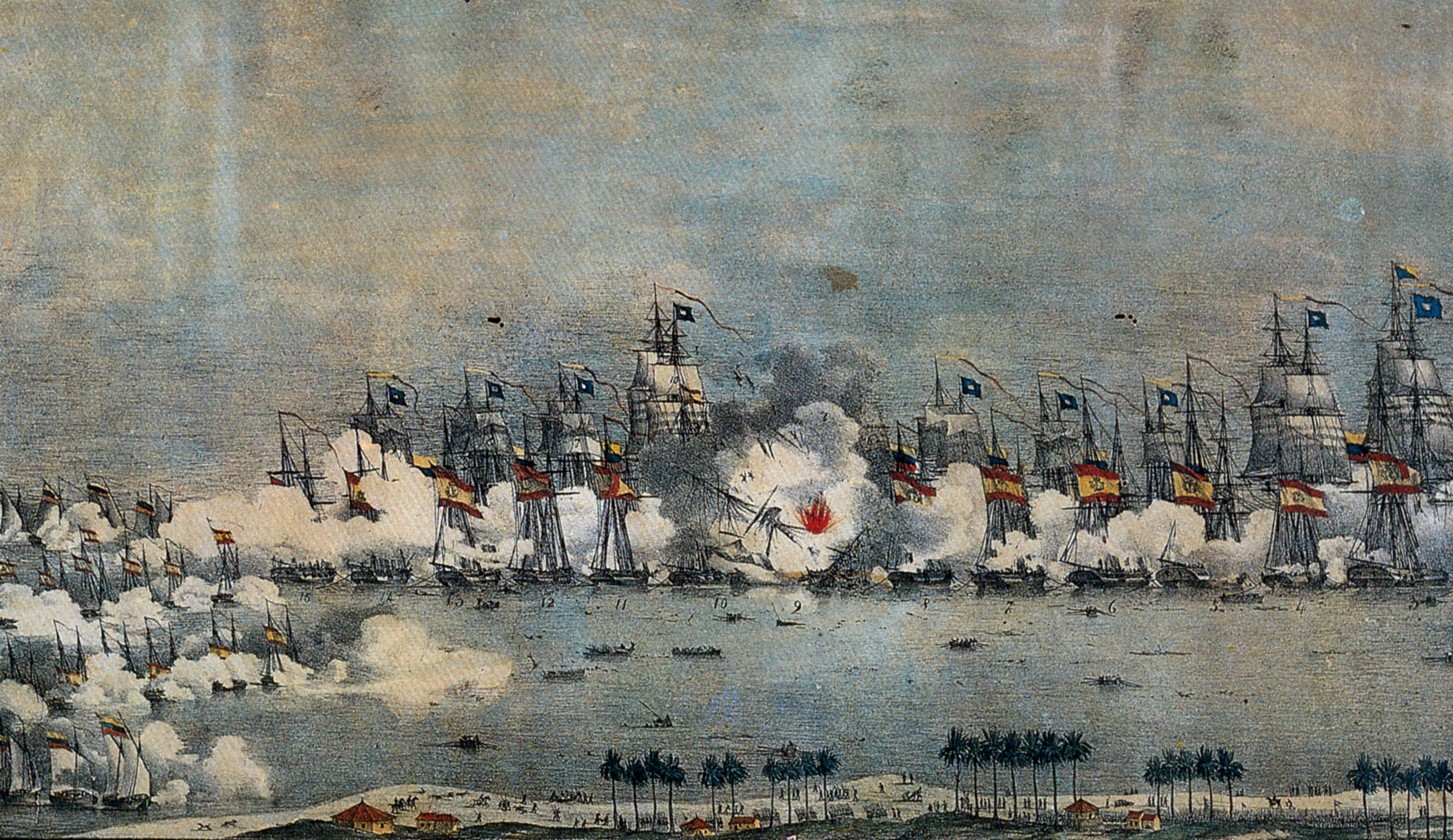
A depiction of the battle from c. 1830.

The Republicans ships moved quickly over the Royalist squadron who remained anchored waiting for the attack, the south wing of the squad carrying Admiral Padilla and the north wing was commanded by Captain Nicholas Joly, cutting off the retreat to the bay. At 15:04, they placed the sign of approaching the opponent, however raised have been answered by all vessels, to show thereby that nothing remained to be done.

At 15:45, Royalist fleet squadrons opened fire on the Patriots. The square of the Grand Colombia fleet continued to advance without firing a shot, until being broken by the cannon fire and musketry. With broken bowsprits the Independent brig, threw themselves over the San Carlos, and began the approach, a phase which decided the victory for Republicans.

As a result of the Republican attack, many Royalist vessels were destroyed and others captured. Some Royalists, in a most desperate situation, cut their anchor cables and tried to set sail and escape, but failed and the larger vessels were captured. Most of the crew of the San Carlos jumped into the water and the same occurred on the other ships. The brig-schooner Esperanza was destroyed by an explosion. Ultimately, only three schooners managed to escape, seeking shelter by the Fort (Castle) of San Carlos. Republican losses included 8 officers and 36 crew killed, with 14 officers and 150 crew wounded. Royalist casualties were higher, with 69 officers and 368 soldiers and sailors taken prisoner.

At days end, Admiral Padilla ordered his squad to make anchor where they had fought. Soon he moved to the Port of Los Puertos de Altagracia to repair the damage to the ships. For his part, Commander Laborde was able to pass by the fort and reach the bar, and after a stop in Puerto Cabello set sail for Cuba.

== Consequences ==
The two hours of fierce combat that decided the battle, paved the way for negotiations between the Republicans and the Spanish Captain General of Venezuela Francisco Tomás Morales. Morales was forced on 3 August to hand over to the Republicans the rest of the Spanish ships, the City of Maracaibo, the Fort of San Carlos, the Fort of San Felipe in Puerto Cabello, and all other sites occupied by the Spanish.
The last Spanish forces left Venezuelan territory on 5 August for good.
