= National Museum of Colombia =

Archeology, art, and history museum in Colombia

- Museo Nacional de Colombia
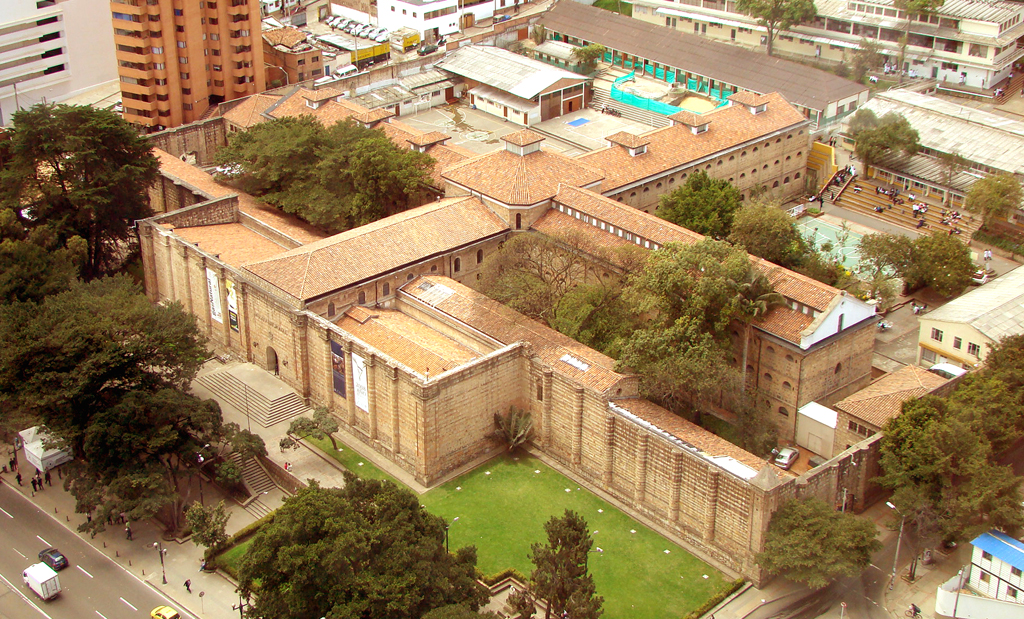
- Logo of the National Museum. Aerial view of the National Museum.
- Established: July 28, 1823; 203 years ago
- Location: Carrera 7 No 28-66; Bogotá, D.C., Colombia 4°36′55.92″N 74°4′8.43″W
- Type: Archeology, art, and history museum
- Public transit access: National Museum (station); Calle 26
- Website: www.museonacional.gov.co

The National Museum of Colombia (Spanish: Museo Nacional de Colombia) is the National Museum of Colombia housing collections on its history, art, culture. Located in the Santa Fe locality of Bogotá, Colombia, it is the largest and oldest museum in Colombia. The National Museum of Colombia is a dependency of the Colombian Ministry of Culture.

The museum houses a collection of over 20,000 pieces including works of art and objects representing different national history periods. Permanent exhibitions present archeology and ethnography samples from Colombian artefacts dating 10,000 years BC, up to twentieth century indigenous and afro- Colombian art and culture. Founders and New Kingdom of Granada room houses Liberators and other Spanish iconography; the round room exhibits a series of oleos from Colombia painting history.

== History ==
Established by an act of Congress on 28 July 1823, the National Museum of Colombia is the oldest museum in the country and one of the oldest in the Americas. The law also created a mining school and provided chairs for both institutions.

The founding staff came from a scientific mission assembled in Europe. In 1822, Simón Bolívar resolved to create a mining school at Bogotá and left recruitment to Francisco Antonio Zea, Gran Colombia's minister in Paris. Peruvian mineralogist Mariano Eduardo de Rivero y Ustáriz was invited to lead the group, which included French chemist Jean-Baptiste Boussingault and several other naturalists. A government decree of March 1824 named Rivero as director of the museum and school of mines.

On 15 October 2026, the Ministry of Culture, Arts and Knowledge removed a group of items from the museum's permanent exhibition, following an instruction from President Abelardo de la Espriella to remove from state public spaces items associated with members of armed groups. Media outlets initially reported the removal of around thirty items, including objects and documents related to LGBT and feminist movements, the political violence of the 1980s and 1990s, the 1991 Constitution, and the 2016 peace agreement.

In its response to a tutela action admitted by the 24th Family Court of Bogotá, the Ministry stated that the measure affected five of the museum's seventeen exhibition rooms (Memoria y Nación, Hacer Sociedad, Tierra como Recurso, Ser y Hacer, and Fuerza, Fe y Sustancia), and that the rooms were not closed. The inventory it submitted lists 63 objects, of which 22 are classified as heritage pieces, and states that they are being stored under technical conservation conditions.

Culture Minister Paola Holguín stated that the museum should not serve as an instrument of "political indoctrination" or a space for the glorification of crime, and that its exhibition rooms are being evaluated and redesigned. Opposition legislators, activist groups, and social media users criticized the removal, describing it as an attempt to erase part of the country's historical memory, while other sectors supported it. Among the arguments raised by critics was that the museum's institutional mission includes recognizing diverse narratives.

On 28 October 2026, the 24th Family Court of Bogotá ordered the Ministry and the museum to return the removed items to their exhibition spaces within 48 hours and to refrain from removing works on the basis of their content or the views they express. The return was ordered to remain in place while the institutions carry out a technical and curatorial assessment of the items. The Ministry complied with the order on 30 October, and the museum reinstalled the 63 items in its exhibition rooms.

On 5 November, it was reported that the National Agency for the Legal Defense of the State (ANDJE) had appealed the first-instance ruling. The Ministry of Culture joined the challenge in a separate filing, arguing, among other points, that the 48-hour deadline did not allow for the conservation assessment required to reinstall fragile items, and that the ruling effectively placed the court in the role of the museum's curator.

== Building ==
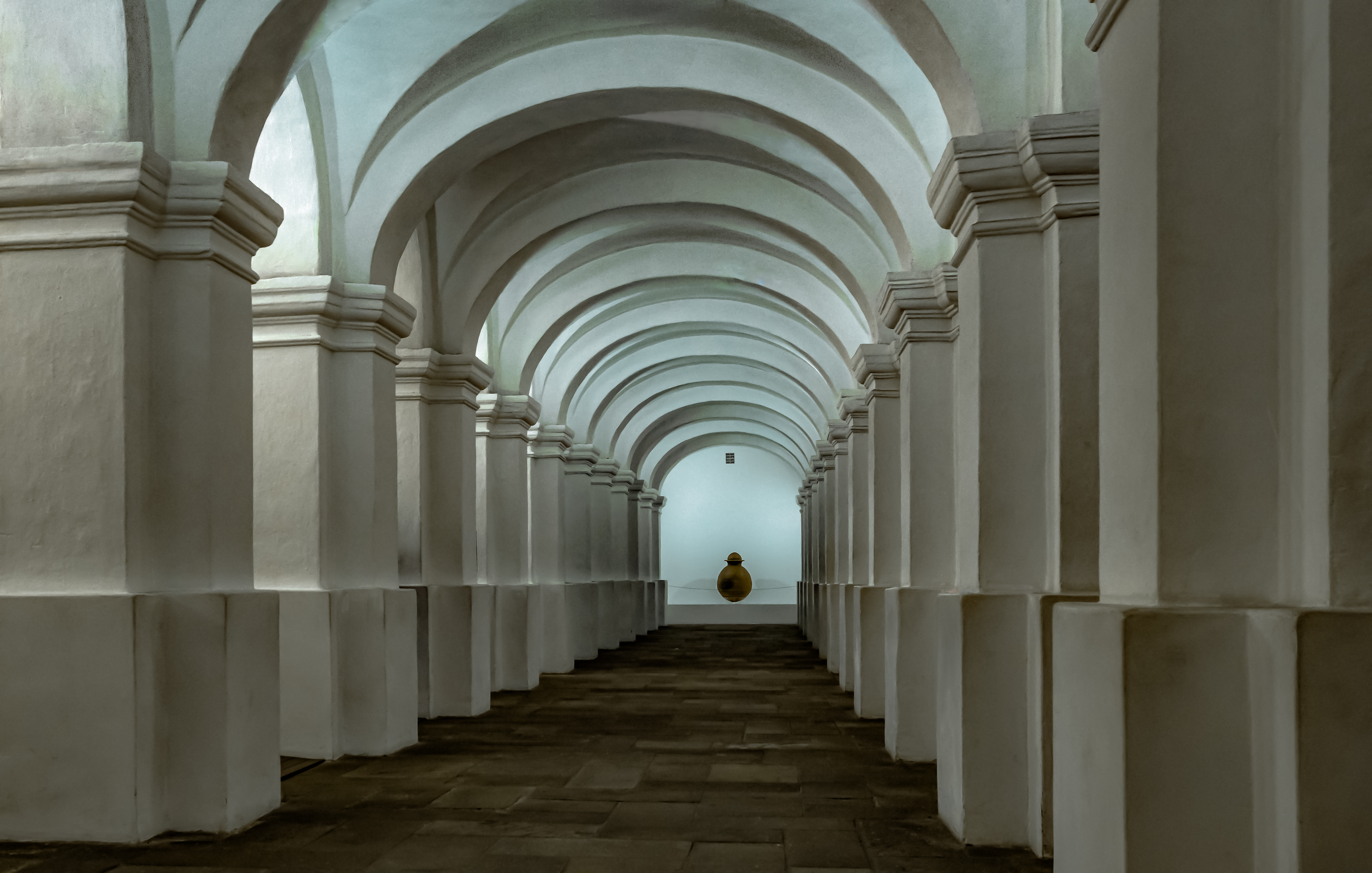
First-floor arcaded corridor, formerly the site of the prison's textile workshops

Designed by Danish architect Thomas Reed in 1850, but constructed in 1872, the Panóptico was Colombia's largest and most important prison until it was replaced by La Picota prison in 1946.

After the last prisoners were transferred to the new facilities, the Panóptico underwent two years of restoration and adapted for museum functions, but the inauguration, scheduled for April 9, 1948, had to be postponed due to the riots that occurred in the city following the assassination of the liberal leader Jorge Eliécer Gaitán. On 2 May 1948, the building was opened to the public with "three national museums": on the first floor the "Archaeological and Ethnographic Museum", on the second the "Historical Museum" and, on the third, the "Museum of Fine Arts".

Between 1976 and 1977, the building was partially restored and the permanent exhibition rooms were restructured with educational criteria and a contemporary museographic design. The same process was followed in 1980 to accommodate the archaeology and ethnography collections.

== Collection ==
Unlike other national museums, the National Museum of Colombia is not divided into different institutions that focus on particular collections. For that reason, the museum divides its collection into four main categories: Archeology, art, ethnography, and social history.

=== Archeology ===
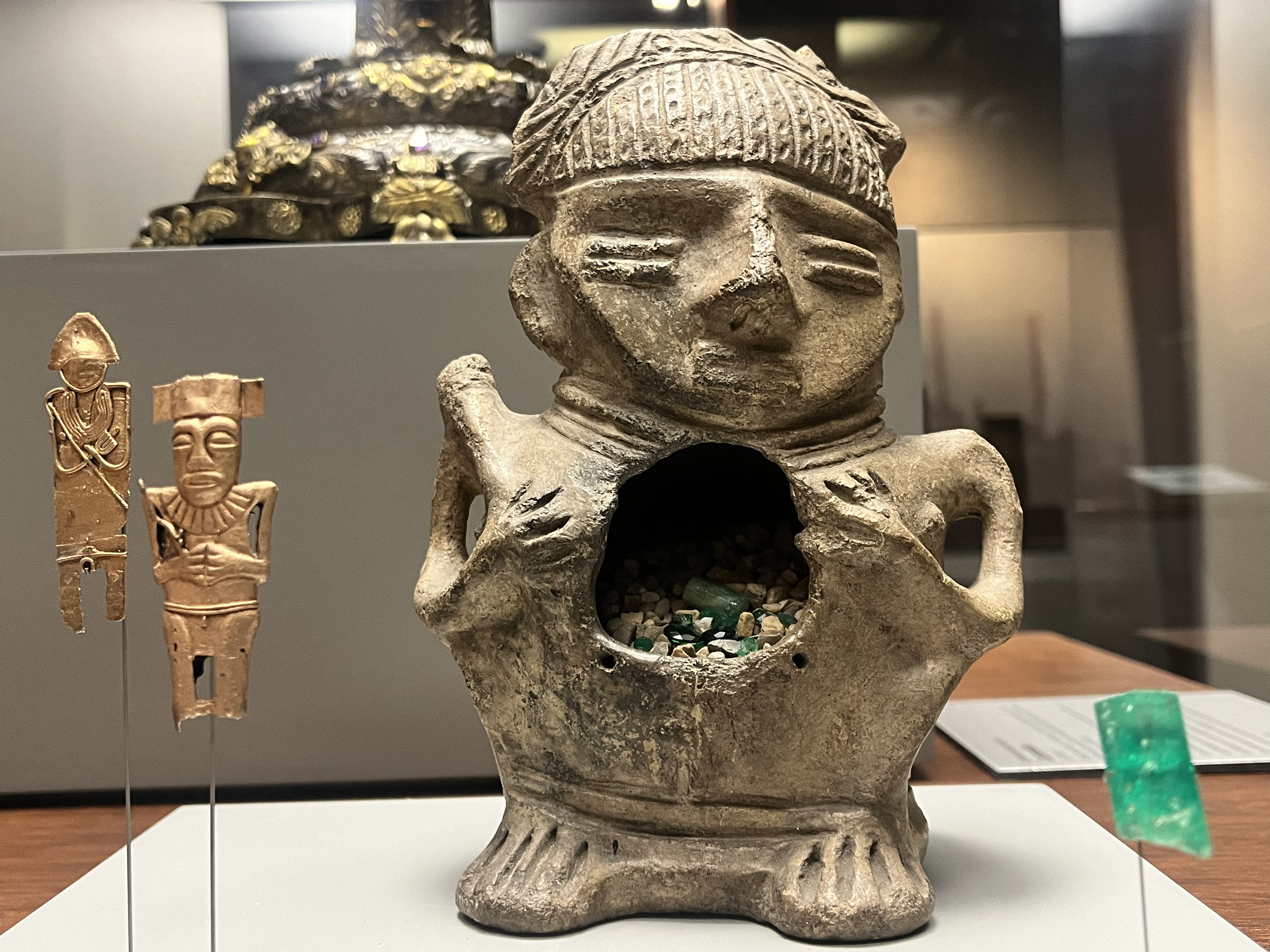
A Muisca ceramic offering vessel with emeralds and tunjos

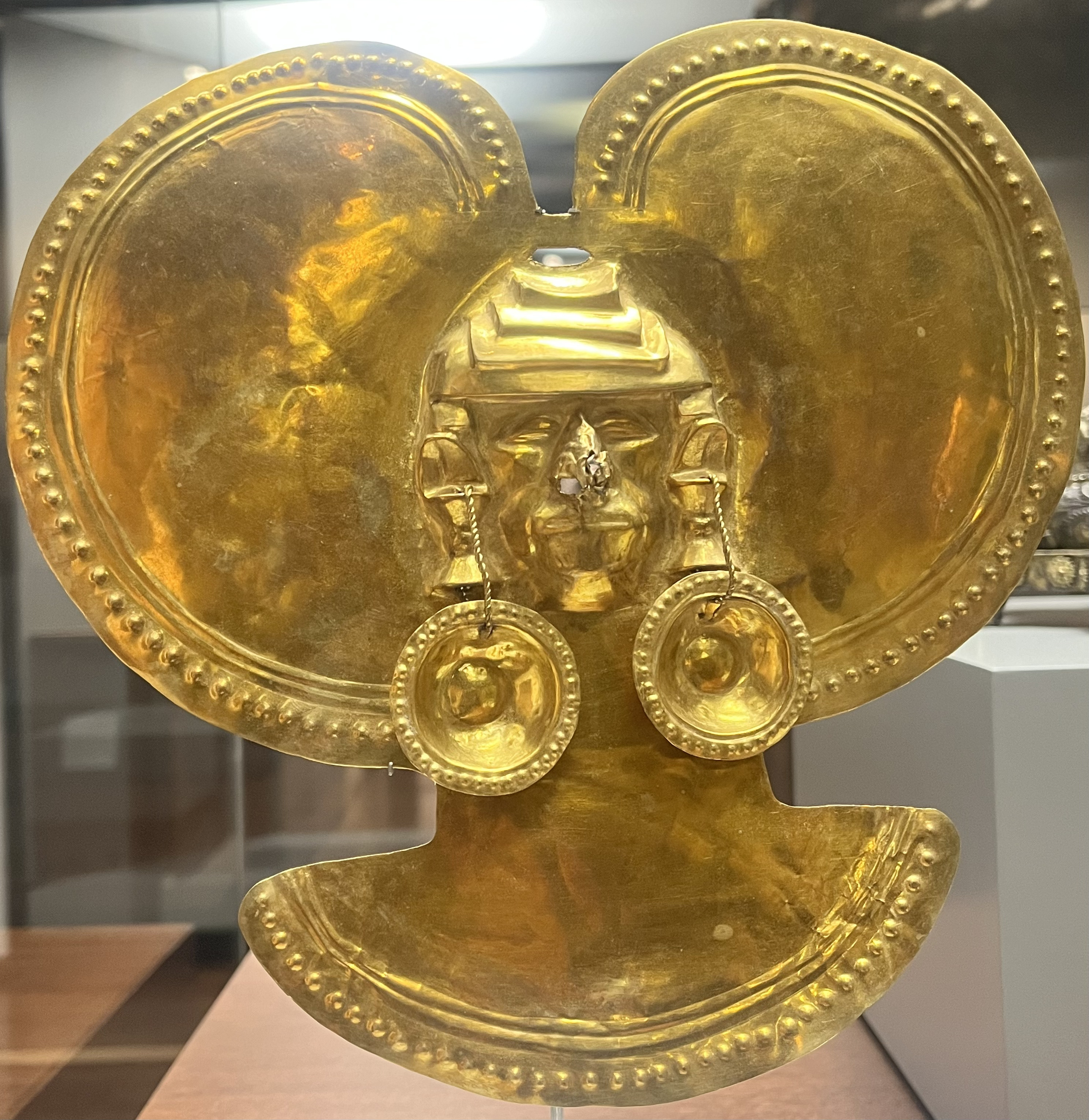
A gold Calima culture pectoral with human figure

Around 10,000 pieces that began to be collected as "curiosities" in the 18th century, as "antiquities" in the 19th century and as a result of systematic research from the first decades of the 20th century, constitute the archaeological collection preserved by the Colombian Institute of Anthropology (ICAN) in the National Museum of Colombia.

When the National Museum was founded in 1823, "large bones of unknown animals" and "a mummy found near Tunja" were part of the collection. Later, during the second half of the 19th century, important studies began to be produced on the "antiquities of the Indians" and in this way objects from the Muisca, Quimbaya and San Agustín cultures were collected.

At the beginning of the 20th century, the first purely archaeological investigations took place, including the excavations carried out by Konrad Theodor Preuss in San Agustín (1913-1914), John Alden Mason in Pueblito and other Tairona areas (1922-1923), and Carlos Cuervo and Gerardo Arrubla in Sogamoso (1924). Important pieces that were exhibited to the public were the product of these excavations.

With the creation of the National Archaeological Service - founded in 1938 by Gregorio Hernández de Alba - and the National Ethnological Institute - founded in 1941 by Paul Rivet - archaeology in Colombia was definitively established and within the department various expeditions were promoted to describe the archaeological areas of the country. In this context, Gregorio Hernández de Alba highlighted the idea of considering objects as revealing documents of the culture of their creators and with this he promoted a new concept in the field of archaeological museums. Towards 1950, stratigraphic excavations, field reports and dating using the Carbon 14 method provided more reliable data on the different cultural areas of the country. It was within this context that such important processes as sedentarization, the emergence of agriculture and ceramics could be duly recorded.

In the 1960s, studies focused on excavations of the first settlers in Colombian territory, under the direction of Gonzalo Correal and Thomas van der Hammen, among others. Numerous objects resulting from these investigations, such as stone tools and bone remains dating from 10,500 to 9,000 BC, were added to the collection. In recent years, emphasis has been placed on research into environmental conditions with important results regarding soils, pollen and bone remains, contributing to further clarifying the panorama of the pre-Hispanic past. Therefore, demographic and settlement patterns, production, exchange and consumption strategies have been accurately established.

Recent research in northern Colombia and the Colombian Amazon has found remains of very early farming villages and hunter-gatherer groups. These finds document the domestication of plants and the emergence of ceramics in these regions.

For the reasons stated above, these collections, in addition to being witnesses to the history of pre-Hispanic societies, are testimony to the formation of anthropology as a discipline in Colombia.

The Archaeology and Heritage Division of the Colombian Institute of Anthropology and History (ICANH) enriches the collections through the research it carries out in the country. Today, the archaeological collections bring together representative pieces from the different periods of settlement of the Colombian territory, ranging from hunter-gatherer groups - approximately 12,000 years ago - to the complex societies that existed upon the arrival of the Spanish. For classification and research, these collections have been divided into ceramic, stone, bone, goldsmith, and textile pieces.

The entire archaeological collection is registered and catalogued in the ISIS program, which allows for faster searches and consultations and contributes to ongoing research. In addition, ICANH is carrying out a project to incorporate the systematized information into a National Archaeology Network that will allow open consultation for students, researchers, and people interested in these collections.

=== Ethnography ===
In the 1940s, interest in the study and support of indigenous communities was consolidated, thanks to the foundation of the Indigenista and Etnológico Nacional Institutes - the latter annex to the Escuela Normal Superior. Under the guidance of Paul Rivet, Gregorio Hernández de Alba, and Justus Wolfran Schottelius, among many other outstanding professors, numerous pioneers carried out expeditions that covered a large part of the national territory. One of the specific objectives was to collect pieces that, in addition to definitively and exceptionally enriching the collections, would reflect the technology and material culture of that time. This fundamental step allowed ethnographic pieces to be considered as "artifacts" and thus separating them from the definitions of relics, antiquities, curiosities or indigenous works of art.

The ethnographic studies documented the diversity of indigenous communities, including their sociocultural organization, oral tradition, and religious practices which are reflected in the collected material culture. Through these efforts, nearly four thousand items were gathered and cataloged- ranging from basketry, everyday and ceremonial clothing, and featherwork to hunting weapons, musical instruments, necklaces, ceramics, and tools-forming the present day ethnographic collection.

During the last decades, multiple studies continue to be developed and the schools of anthropological thought are recognized in monographs that cover the great diversity of existing groups. However, the collection of material culture has ceased to be a fundamental objective and the acquisition of new pieces is increasingly less due, among other causes, to new techniques for recording information - such as audiovisual media and research carried out by and for the community itself - that allow other ways of reviewing in context the objects used by contemporary indigenous and Afro-Colombian communities.

=== Art ===
The Art Department is in charge of the paintings, sculptures, drawings, engravings, photographs and videos in the museum's collection. The investigation of these objects emphasizes artistic narratives about the geography, nature, regions and people of Colombia. Likewise, it reveals the symbolic power of the image in the processes of religious and political domination. The collections reveal the transitions from a classical academic language towards new aesthetic expressions of national art. The interest in beauty, the encounter with plastic expression through bright color and loose brushstrokes, the search for identity in indigenism, the international projection of local artists and the development of conceptual communication accounts for the richness of this collection.

==== Drawing ====
The drawing area includes works by artists and scientists: painters, sculptors, miniaturists, geographers, caricaturists and architects, through techniques such as charcoal, pencil, ink, pastel, watercolor and miniature; The latter is an important section of the collection, made up of 92 pieces. Aware of the specificity of this collection, the National Museum of Colombia created the Cabinet of Drawing and Graphic Arts and the Cabinet of Miniatures, two rooms equipped for the exhibition of this type of works, in which selected works are temporarily exhibited to make them known to the public.

==== Painting ====
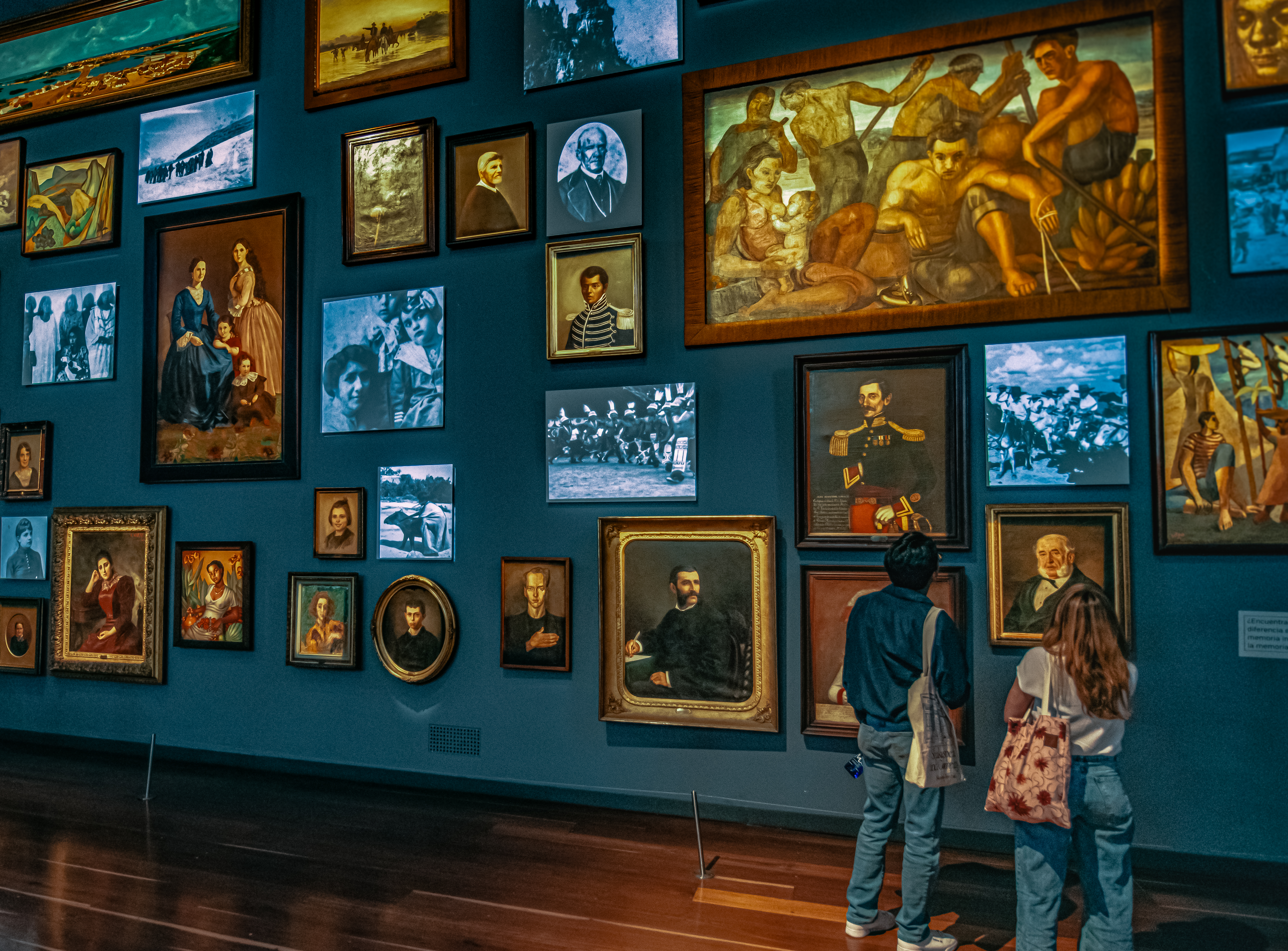
A wall known as El Muro with several paintings

The painting area is made up of easel painting, mural painting, and other formats that bring together almost 900 works.

Although the Museum was created as a complement to the School of Mining, painting had a notable presence from the very beginning. In the first systematic catalogue of the collection, published in 1881, a total of 77 works were recorded. At the beginning of the 20th century, the receipt of legacies allowed the presence of paintings to be consolidated in the collections.

The painting, together with the other pieces of the art collection, passed into the hands of the National University, and until 1948, the year in which they were returned to the National Museum, they formed the collection of the Museum of the School of Fine Arts of Bogotá. During this time, important paintings of international art were acquired. At present, it is characterized by its representation of Colombian artists of the 19th and early 20th centuries.

The collection includes significant groups of works by painters such as José María Espinosa, Epifanio Garay, Ricardo Acevedo Bernal, Andrés de Santa María, Ricardo Borrero Álvarez, Miguel Díaz Vargas, Ignacio Gómez Jaramillo, among others. In recent years, this panorama has been enriched by donations of paintings by Guillermo Wiedemann, Fernando Botero, and Enrique Grau.

The museum houses Escena campesina (1575), a rare panel painting by Flemish painter Marten van Cleve depicting a rural scene.

==== Decorative arts ====
Although the Decorative Arts Area represents a small percentage of the art collections, the objects distributed among furniture, household items, and decorative objects are representative of the development of the national industry with high-quality manufacturing. The collection includes among its most notable pieces the first objects produced by the La Bogotana pottery factory, donated by Francisco de Paula Santander in 1834, and the hand-operated organ for domestic use made by Juan P. Silgado, a craftsman from Sahagún, Bolívar, in 1899.

This collection also shows the trade of luxury objects with countries such as France, England, and Spain, which contextualize the daily life and customs of Colombians in the 18th, 19th, and 20th centuries.

=== History ===
==== Historic documents ====
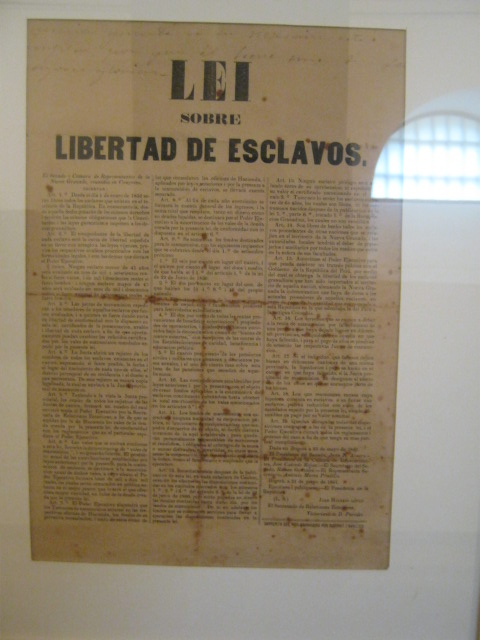
Law abolishing slavery in Colombia

Within the Historical Documents area, there are three types of documents that can be found: photographs, printed material, and manuscripts. To date, 1,347 pieces have been classified as such, including photographs, business cards, books, brochures, maps, atlases, sheet music, official documents, and letters.

There are two important groups: one formed by the donation of former President Eduardo Santos Montejo in 1959, made up of the series of 19th-century travelers' books, photographs, manuscripts, and printed material that illustrate different aspects of the country's history during the 19th and early 20th centuries. The second group corresponds to the acquisition of nearly 100 letters to Juan Antonio Pardo Ospina around 1955, in which there are eight autographed letters from Simón Bolívar, 37 addressed to him, and many others from protagonists of the history of Colombia, Peru, and Venezuela in the first half of the 19th century.

The recent donation by Enrique Mutis Dávila of 15 documents belonging to José Celestino Mutis and some of his descendants, dating from 1793 to 1906, stands out within the area.

==== Numismatic ====
The numismatic collection of the National Museum preserves coins, banknotes, and public debt documents representative of the country's economic history.

From the colonial period, there are outstanding examples of macuquina and cordoncillo coins minted in Potosí, Lima, Bogotá, and Popayán. The collection is also made up by a group of dies that were used in the Bogotá mint to manufacture coins, royal oaths, medals, and seals for public documents from the 18th to the 20th century.

From the 19th century, there are examples of different issues of metallic currency issued from Independence to the Regeneration. An important chapter in the country's monetary history was the Thousand Days' War, as it produced a number of numismatic samples of great interest. The collection also includes bonds, vouchers, and other public debt documents circulated together with banknotes and coins while the country's economy was recovering, until the founding of the Bank of the Republic in the 1920s, from which time on, this institution was in charge of issuing the national currency.

==== Testimonial objects ====
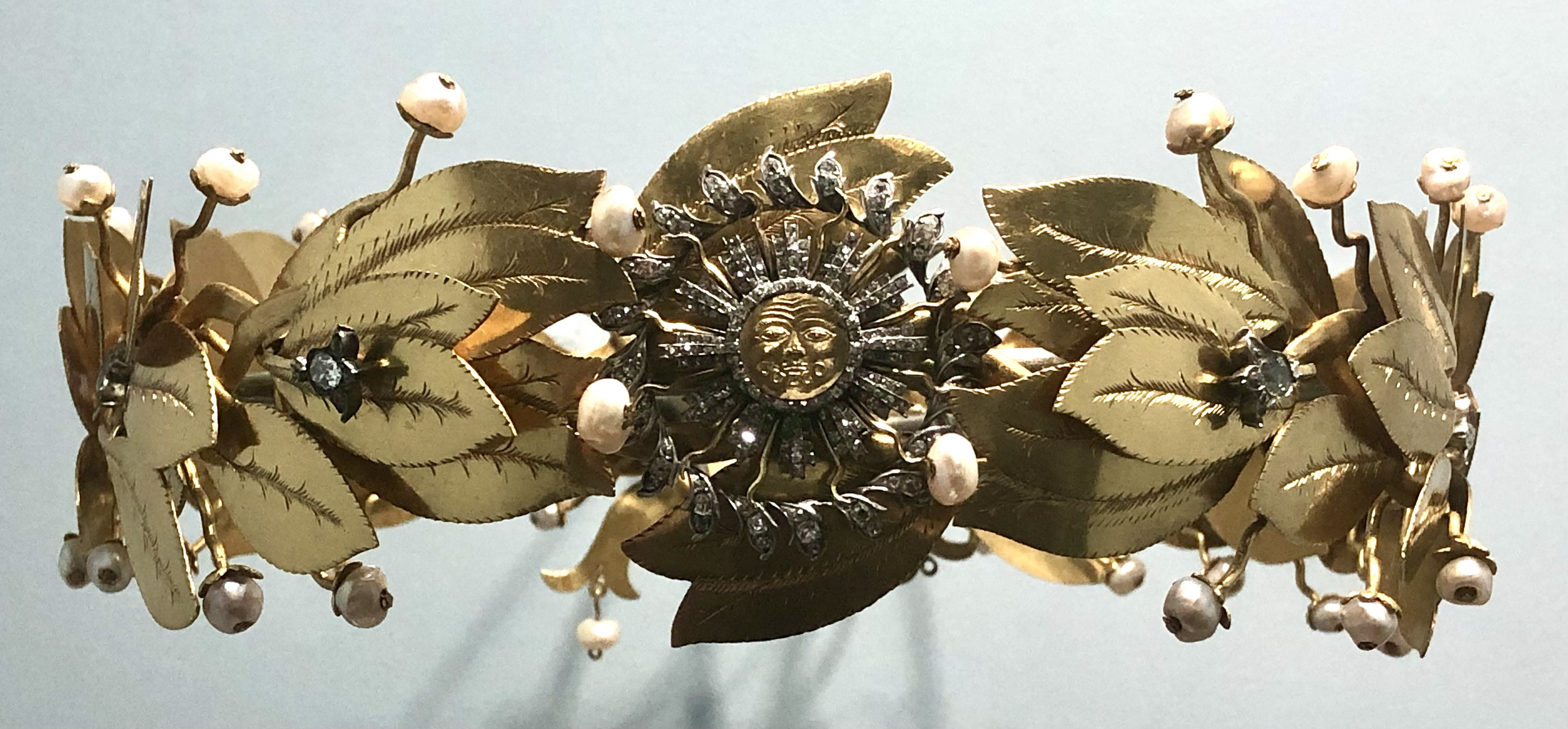
The civic crown gifted to Simón Bolívar by the people of Cusco.

The Testimonial Objects Area includes pieces that are testimony to historical events and relevant figures in the development of the nation's cultural processes.

The first piece was admitted with a decree from Congress, dated February 12, 1825, which deposited in the Museum a silver medal, commemorating the battles of Junín and Ayacucho. Other early pieces that made up this collection are the Royal Standard of Castile, with which Francisco Pizarro conquered Peru in 1531, and captured during the Independence Campaign in 1824 along with four other flags sent by General Antonio José de Sucre to the Government of Colombia. The collection also includes a civic gold garland that the people of Cusco offered to Bolívar in 1825.

The area has around 600 pieces, including a large collection of weapons sent by the Ministry of War in 1958 and others donated by the Beatriz Osorio Foundation from 1950 onwards, uniforms, furniture, decorations, and objects of individuals who were part of national history, many of them donated by their relatives, ranging from the 16th to the 20th century.

==== Scientific objects ====
The National Museum was initially conceived as a museum of natural sciences. The collection included mineralogical samples, zoological collections, herbariums and objects of historical value. Between 1842 and 1945, the Museum's holdings were divided and formed the basis of the different collections and museums of the National University: the botanical samples that formed the herbarium went to the Faculty of Medicine and Natural Sciences; the zoology collection went to the Natural History Museum of the Institute of Natural Sciences and the geology, mineralogy and paleontology collections went to the Geological Museum of the Faculty of Mathematics and Engineering, currently the National Geological Museum of Ingeominas José Royo Gómez.

For this reason, the current National Museum preserves a small sample of instruments and objects related to scientific research, which serve as a reference to this important aspect of Colombian history. Some of these objects became part of the collection from the beginning of the National Museum and were tools used during the Botanical Expedition, the Scientific Mission of 1823 and the Chorographic Commission.

== Selected exhibitions ==
- 13 May 2000 – 11 August 2000: Picasso in Bogotá
- 30 August 2002 – 27 October 20002: Rembrandt in Colombia: Engravings
- 20 June 2003 - 20 July 2003: Francisco Toledo: Killing Luck. Drawings.
- 7 November 2003 – 4 January 20004: Pierre Balmain, a fashion architect (1945-2002)
- 8 April 2005 – 31 July 2005: Egypt: A step towards eternity (4000 BC - 135 AC)
- 16 March 2006 - 14 May 2006: The Édgar Negret Era
- 15 June 2006 – 17 September 2006: The Chinese Terracotta Army: An Immortal Army
- 3 December 2009 – 28 February 2010: Feliza Bursztyn, In Praise of Scrap Metal
- 11 July 2013 – 13 October 2013: Gods, Myths, and Religion of Ancient Greece
- 12 February 2015 – 17 February 2016: Omar Rayo: Vibrant Geometry
- 17 June 2017 – 4 September 2017: Julio Abril, with sculptor's wood
- 4 August 2018 – 28 October 2018: A Young Master. The Early Work of Fernando Botero (1948-1963)
- 13 April 2019 – 16 June 2019: Pedro Nel Gómez, tales of the nation

== In popular culture ==
The museum is featured in Yo soy Betty, la fea with the 2000 Picasso in Bogotá exhibition being the main setting for a number of episodes of the series.

== Gallery ==
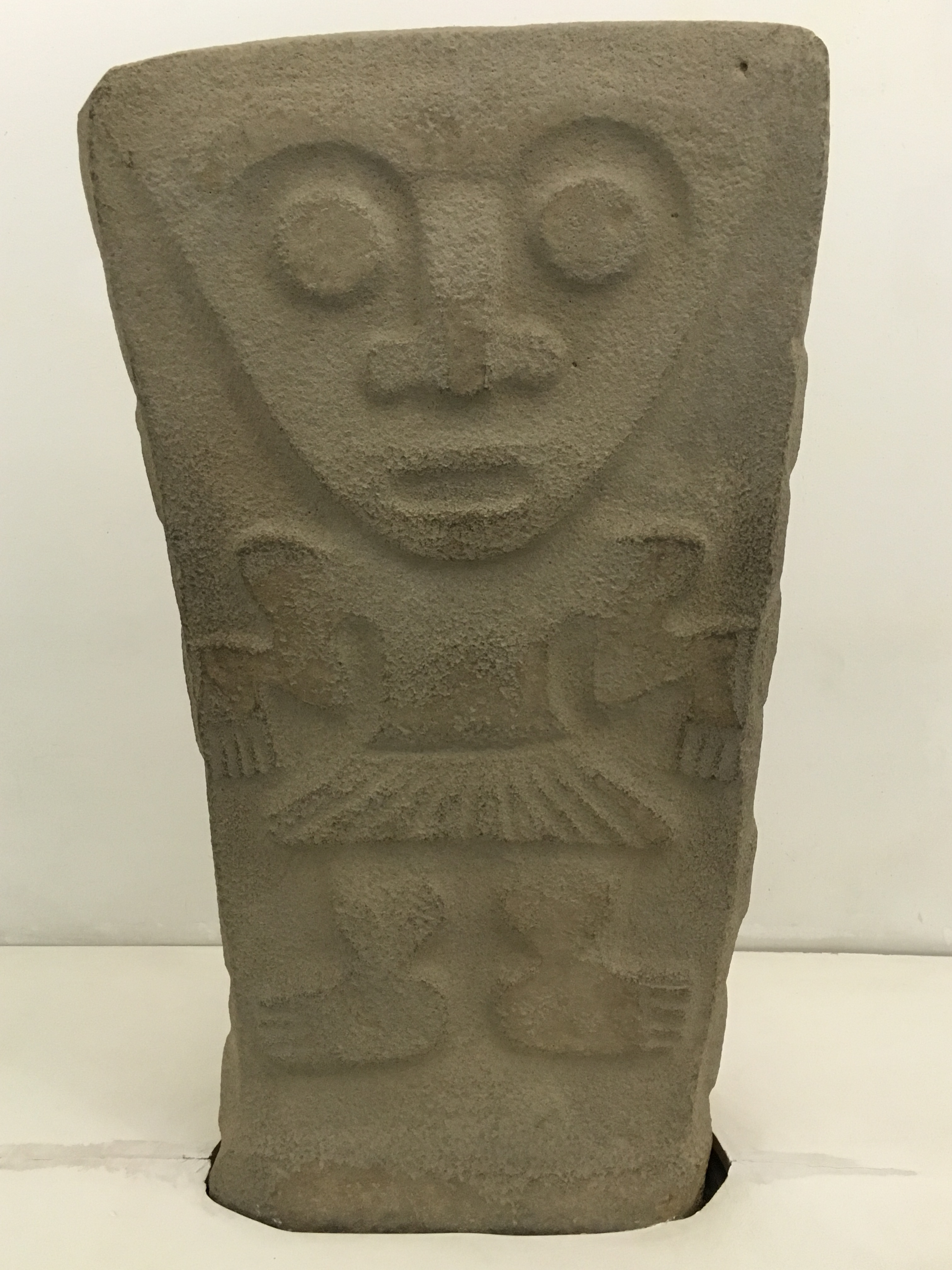
A pre-Columbian stone sculpture from the San Agustín culture

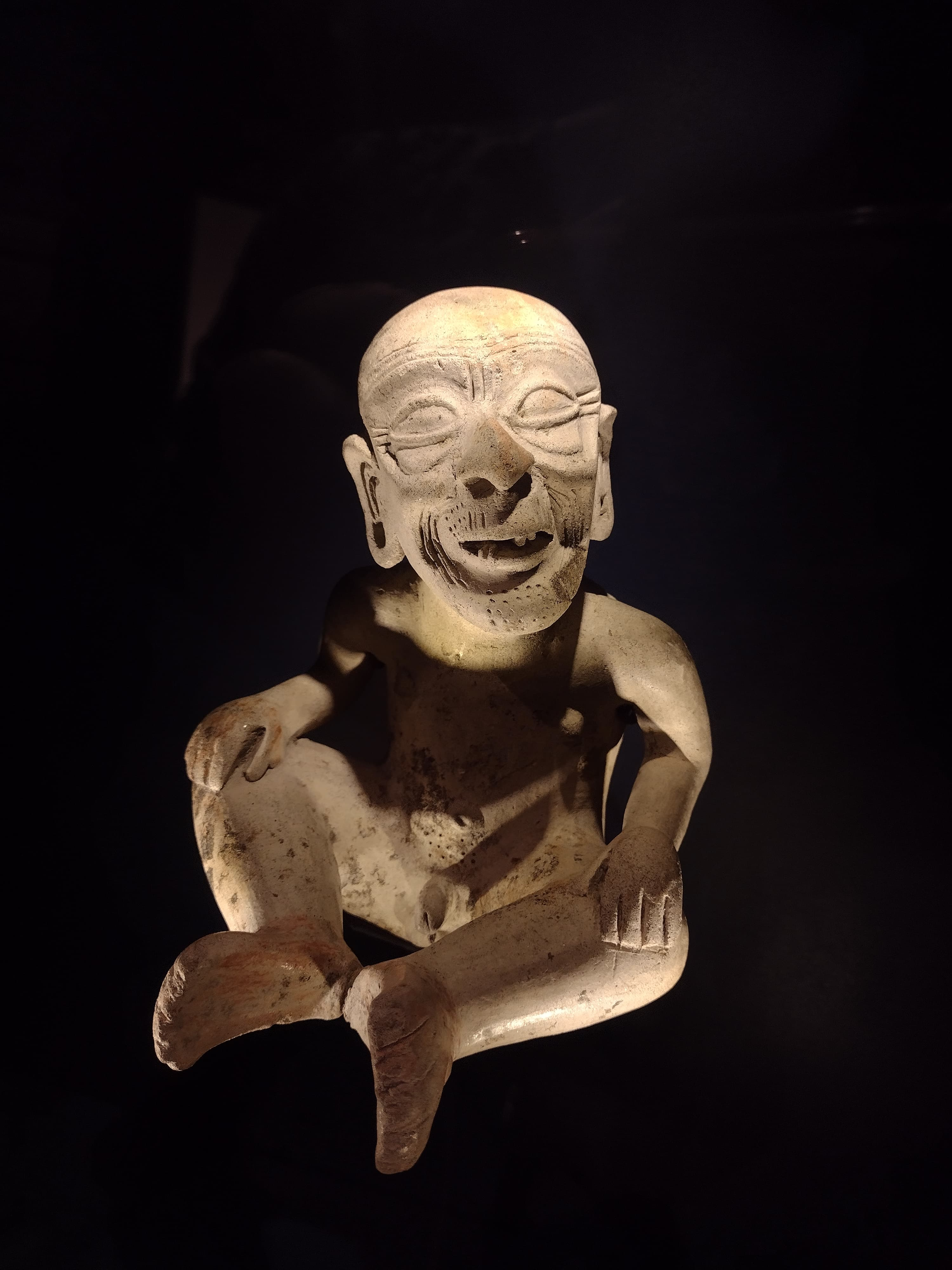
A pre-Columbian Tumaco-La Tolita culture ceramic

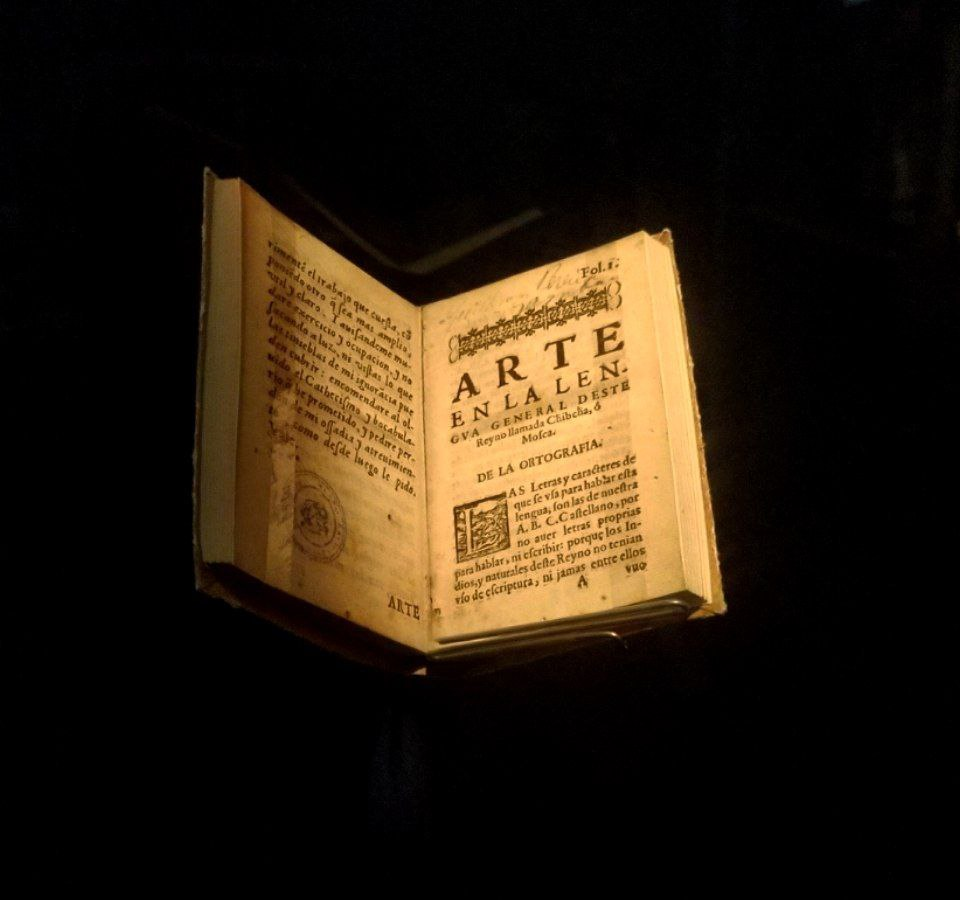
1634 textbook by Bernardo de Lugo documenting the extinct Chibcha language

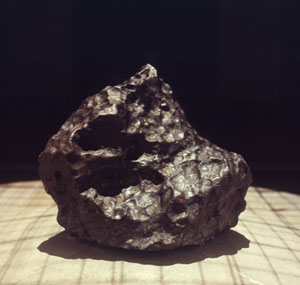
Large fragment of the Santa Rosa de Viterbo meteorite found in 1810

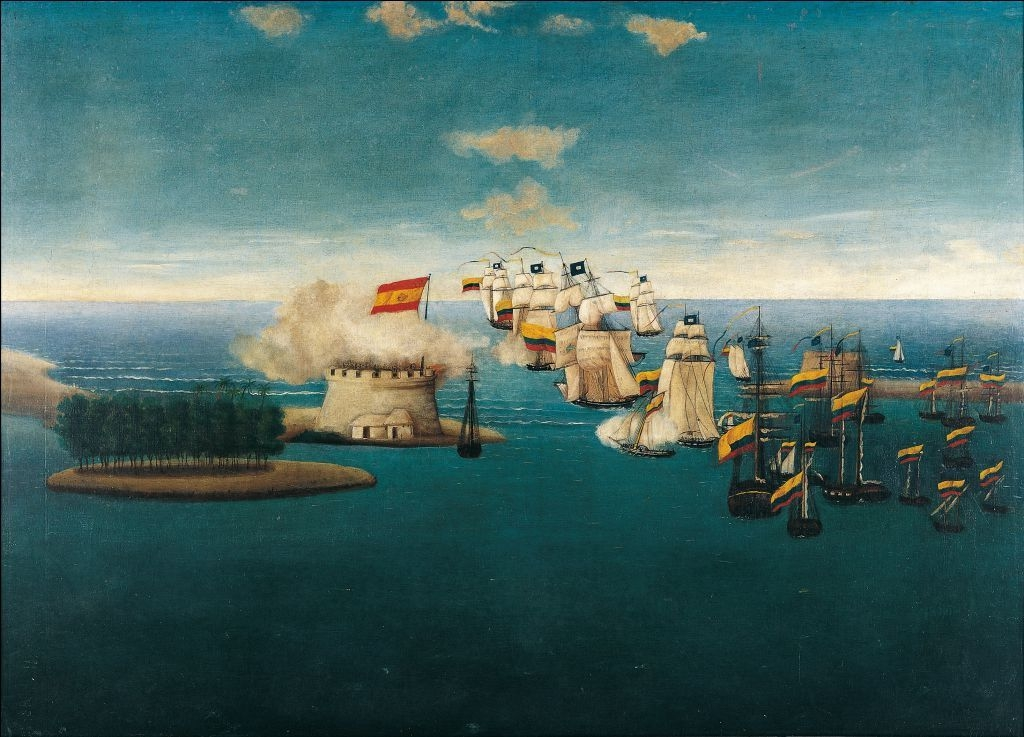
Action on the Maracaibo Castle (1823) by José María Espinosa Prieto

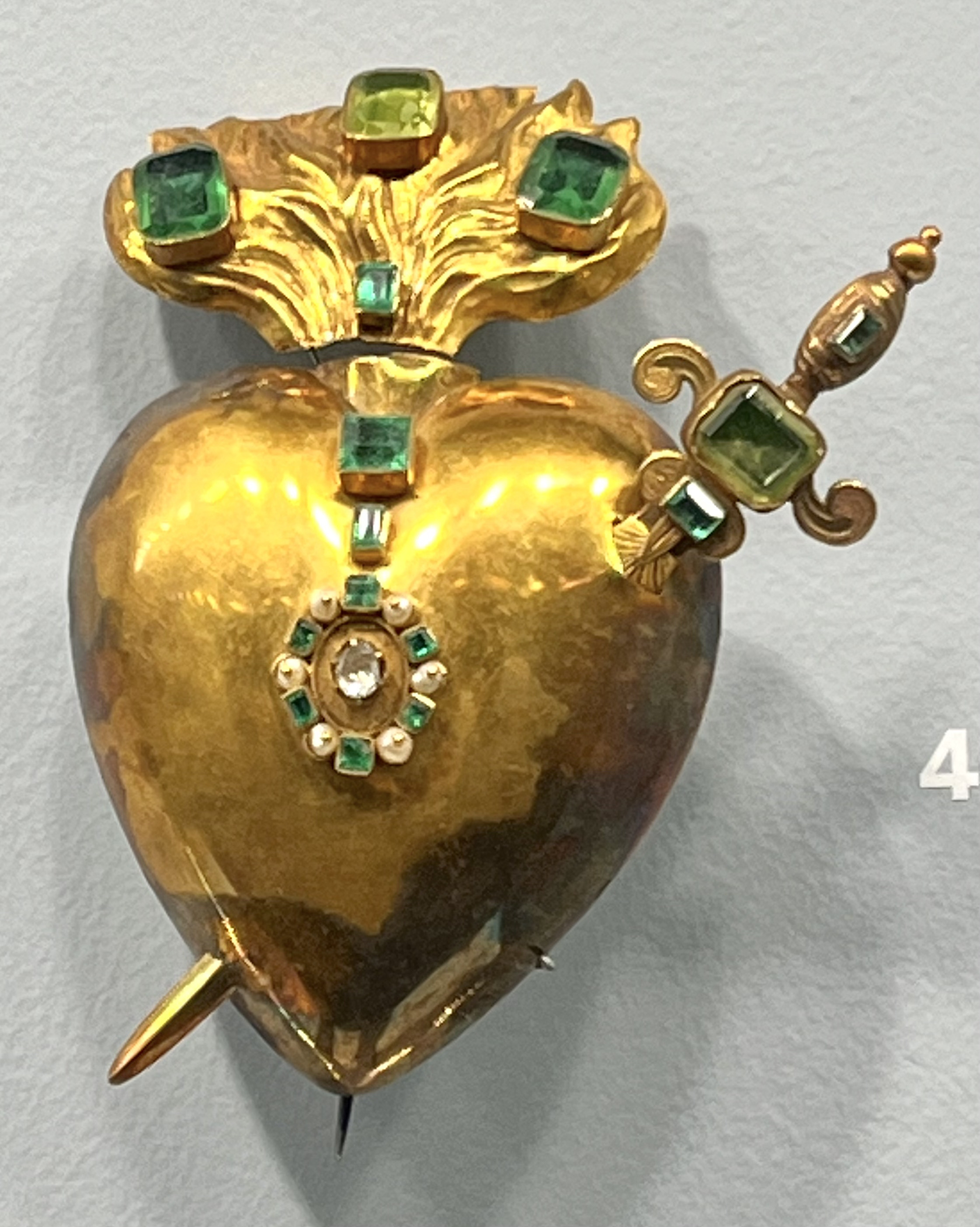
A gold brooch representing the Immaculate Heart of Mary (ca 1874)

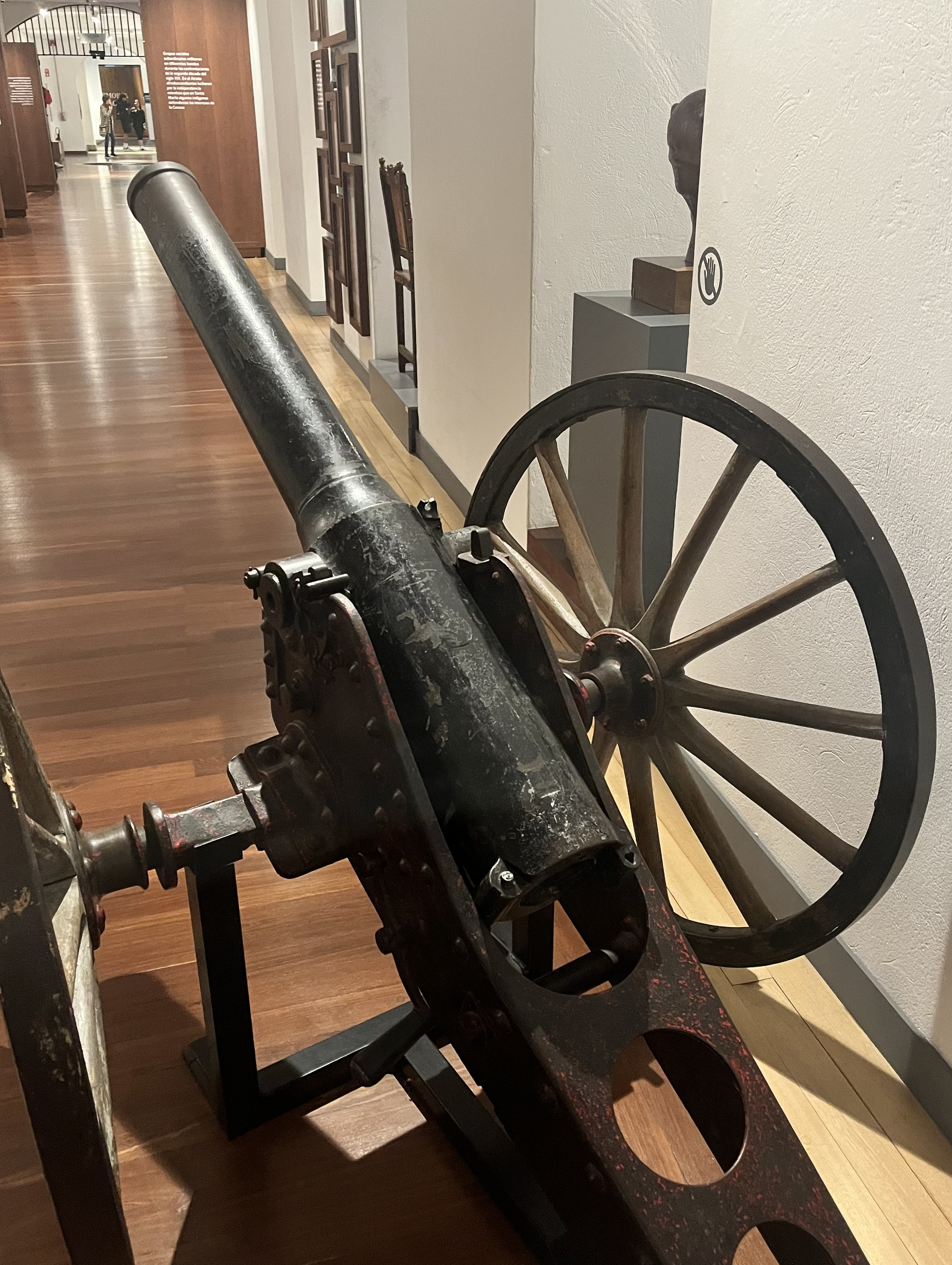
A cannon used in the Thousand Days' War

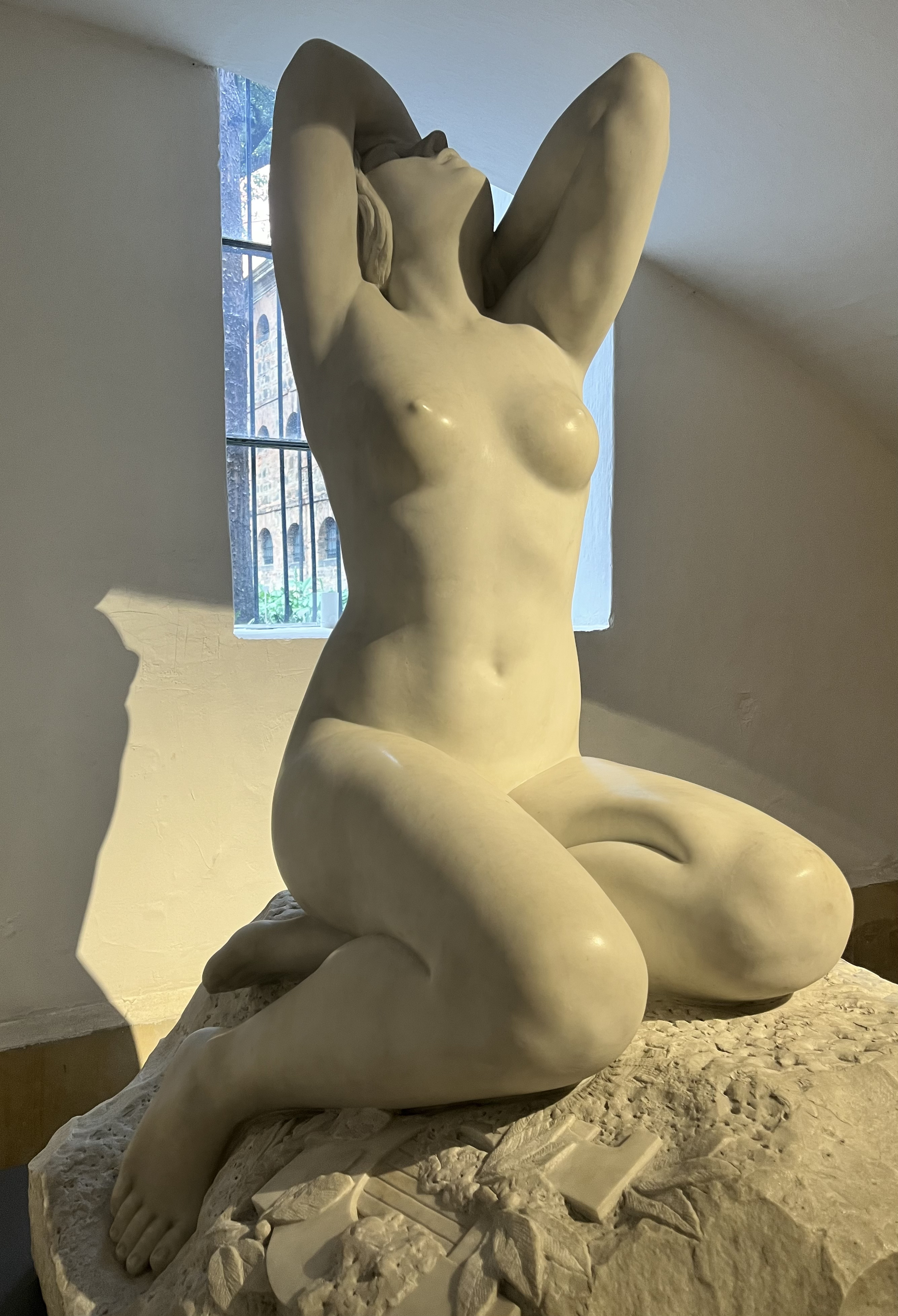
La poesía (ca 1917) by Marco Tobón Mejía

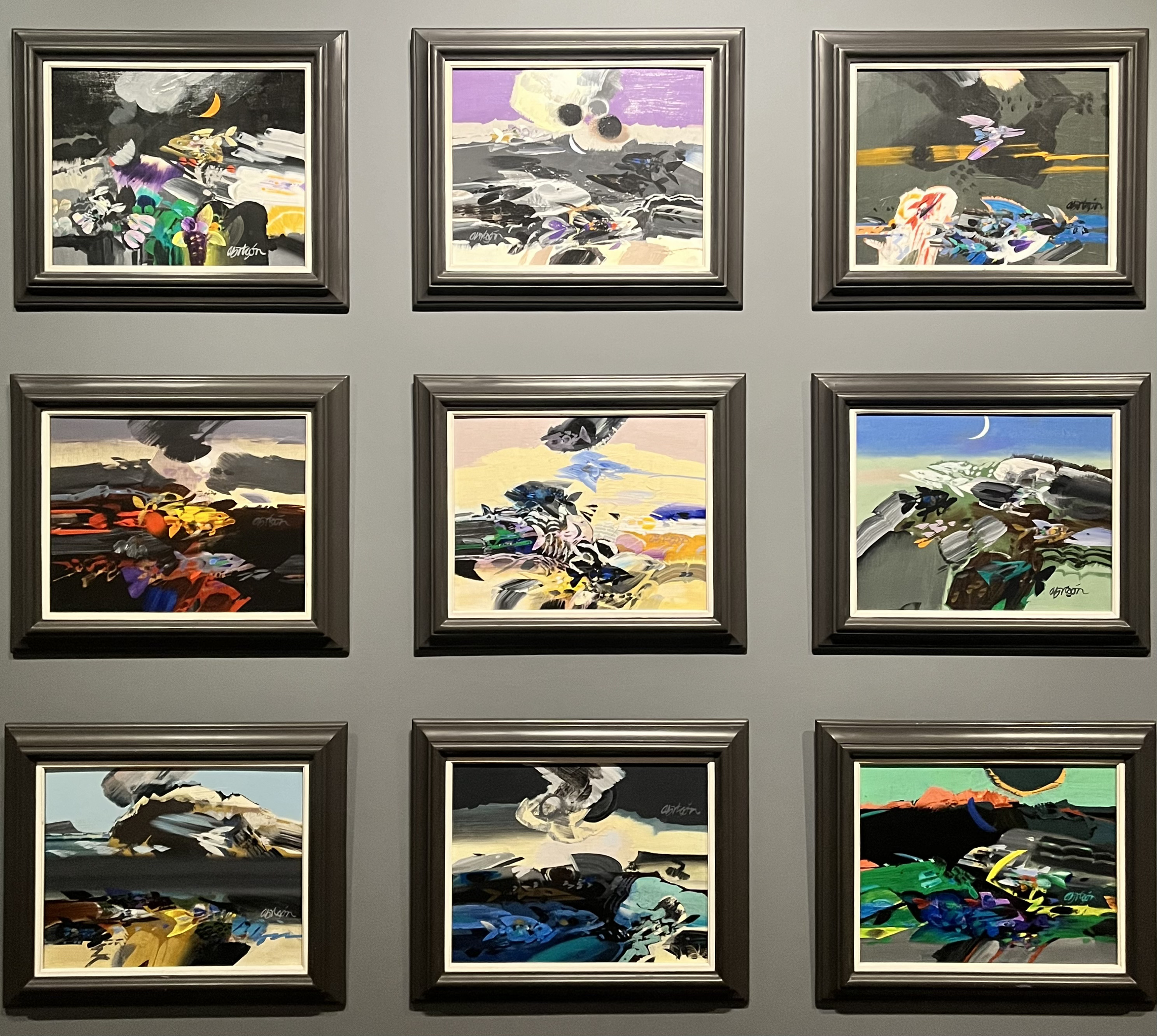
Various paintings by Alejandro Obregón

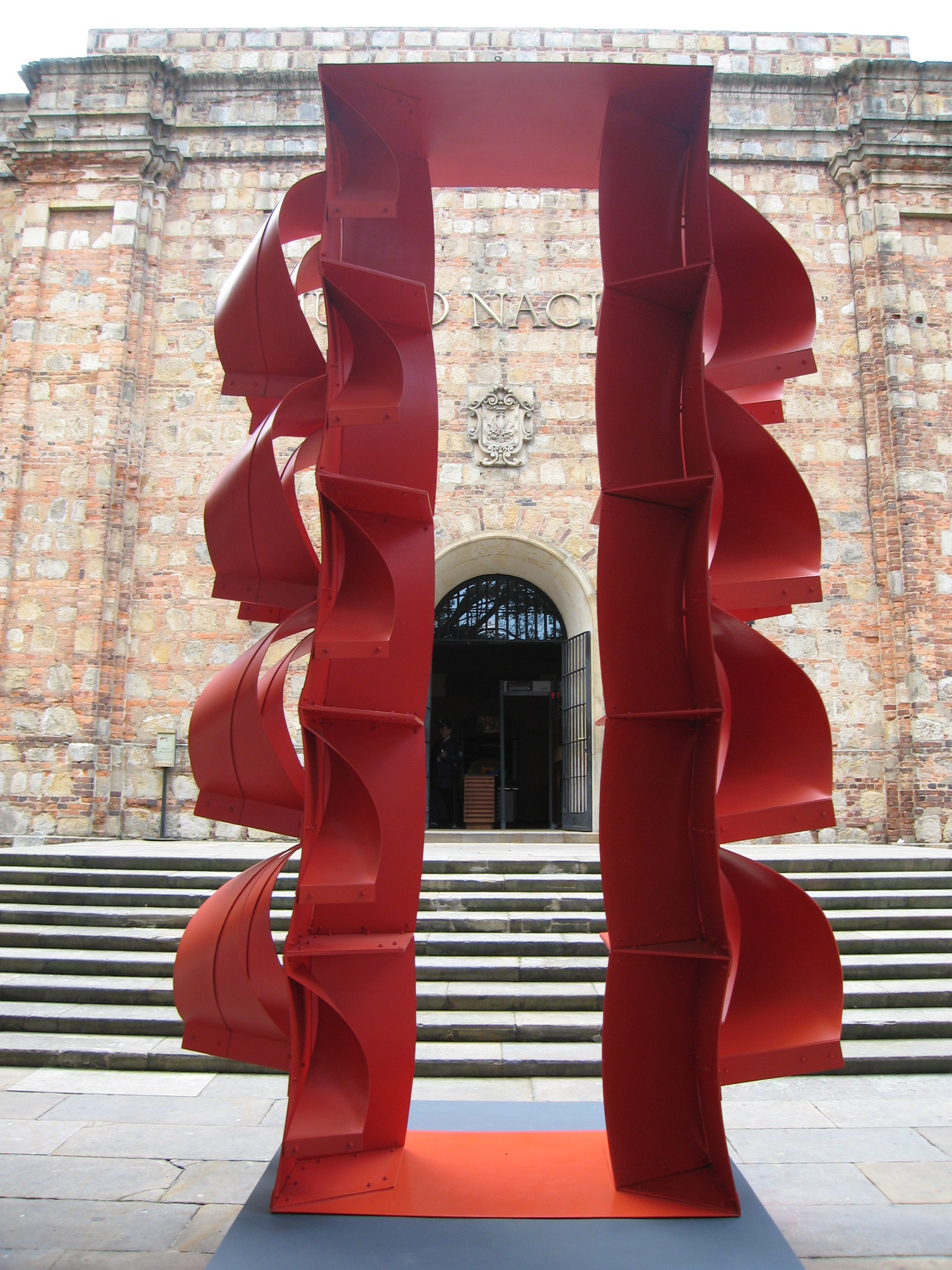
Cascada (1988) by Édgar Negret

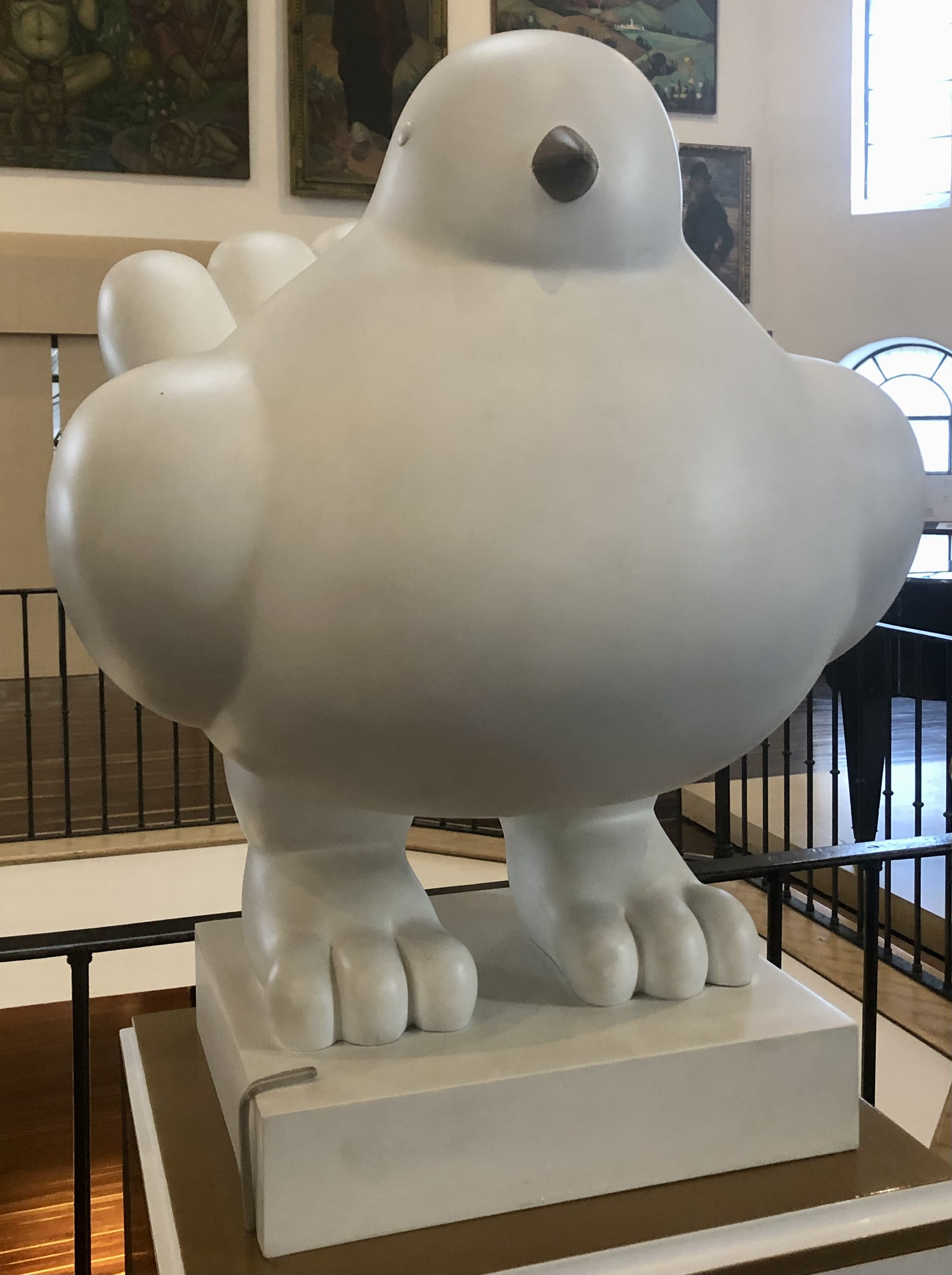
La paloma de la paz (2016) by Fernando Botero

== See also ==
- Fragmentos, an art gallery and memorial managed by the National Museum of Colombia
