= José Fedor Rey =

José Fedor Rey a.k.a. Javier Delgado (1 December 1951 in Cali – 30 June 2002 in Palmira, Valle del Cauca) was a Colombian guerrilla, and leader of the Ricardo Franco Front.
