= List of presidents of the Chamber of Representatives of Colombia =

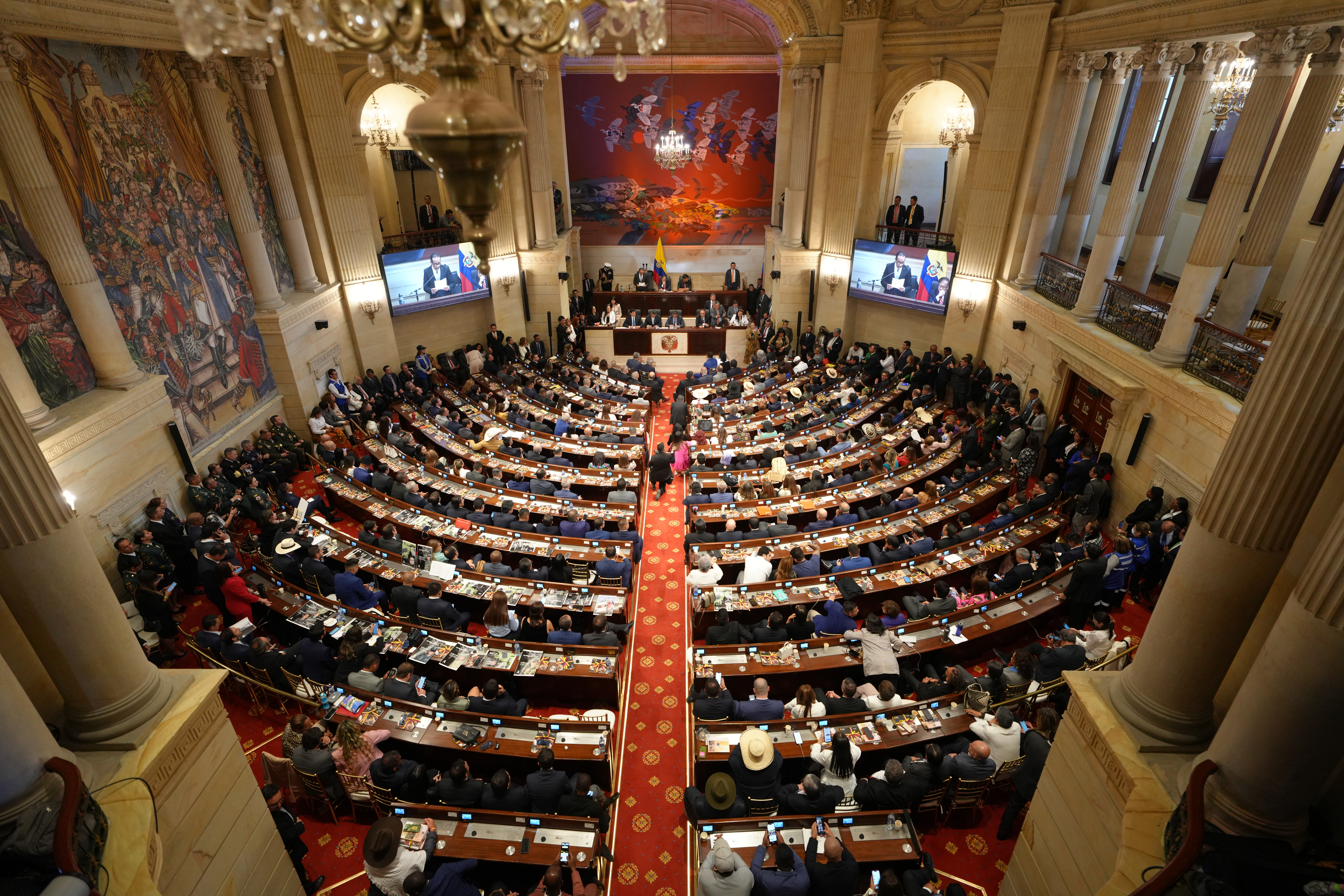
The Chamber of Representatives.

The president of the Chamber of Representatives is the president of the Chamber of Representatives of Colombia. The office was first established in 1882 by Article II, Section 2, of the Cúcuta Constitution. The president is the political and parliamentary leader of the Chamber and is simultaneously the president of the body, the de facto leader of the majority party or political coalition of the body and the administrative head of the institution. Presidents also perform various administrative and procedural functions, in addition to representing their own district in Congress. He occupies fourteenth place in the order of precedence, he is fourteenth behind the President of the Council of State, and ahead of the President of the Superior Council of the Judiciary.

The Chamber elects a new speaker by roll call vote when it meets for the first time after a presidential election, for its one-year term, or when a presidents dies, resigns, or is removed from office during the term. To elect a president, a majority of the votes cast is needed. If no candidate receives a majority of votes, roll call voting is repeated until a president is elected. The Constitution requires that the president be a sitting member of the Chamber, although until now all presidents have been. Since the re-incorporation of the office in 1979, in total, 43 people, from 20 departments, have served as presidents of the Chamber.

== List ==
List of speakers of the Chamber of Representatives of Colombia
Congress	Term	Name	Party	District (Note: The district listed is the district the speaker represented at the time they were in office, which may be different in different Congresses due to redistricting.)
—	July 20, 1979 – July 20, 1980	Adalberto Ovalle	Liberal	Cesar
—	July 20, 1980 – July 20, 1981	Hernando Turbay	Conservative	Caquetá
1st (Note: Following the adoption of the 1991 Constitution, the numbering of the legislature began to be counted from one.)	July 20, 1981 – July 20, 1982	Aurelio Iragorri	Liberal	Cauca
1st	July 20, 1982 – July 20, 1983	Hernando Gómez	Conservative	Boyacá
1st	July 20, 1983 – July 20, 1984	César Gaviria	Liberal	Risaralda
1st	July 20, 1984 – July 20, 1985	Daniel Mazuera	Conservative	Cundinamarca
2nd	July 20, 1985 – July 20, 1986	Miguel Pineda Vidal	Radical Change	Magdalena
2nd	July 20, 1986 – July 20, 1987	Román Gómez Ovalle	Conservative	La Guajira
2nd	July 20, 1987 – July 20, 1989	Francisco Jattin	Liberal	Córdoba
2nd	July 20, 1989 – July 20, 1990	Norberto Morales	Conservative	Santander
3rd	July 20, 1990 – July 20, 1991	Hernán Berdugo	Liberal	Atlántico
3rd	July 20, 1992 – July 20, 1993	César Pérez	Conservative	Antioquia
3rd	July 20, 1993 – July 20, 1994	Francisco Jattin	Liberal	Córdoba
3rd	July 20, 1994 – July 20, 1995	Álvaro Benedetti	Conservative	Bolívar
4th	July 20, 1995 – July 20, 1996	Rodrigo Rivera Salazar	Liberal	Risaralda
4th	July 20, 1996 – July 20, 1997	Giovanni Lamboglia	Conservative	Atlántico
4th	July 20, 1997 – July 20, 1998	Carlos Ardila Ballesteros	Liberal	Santander
4th	July 20, 1998 – July 20, 1999	Emilio Martínez	Conservative	Tolima
5th	May 12, 1999 – July 20, 1999	Armando Pomarico	Liberal	Magdalena
5th	July 20, 1999 – July 20, 2000	Nancy Patricia Gutiérrez	Liberal	Cundinamarca
5th	July 20, 2000 – July 20, 2001	Basilio Villamizar	Liberal	North Santander
5th	July 20, 2001 – July 20, 2002	Guillermo Gaviria	Conservative	Antioquia
6th	July 20, 2002 – July 20, 2003	William Vélez	Liberal	Antioquia
6th	July 20, 2003 – July 20, 2004	Alonso Acosta	Conservative	Atlántico
6th	July 20, 2004 – July 20, 2005	Zulema Jattin	Liberal	Córdoba
6th	July 20, 2005 – July 20, 2006	Julio Gallardo Archbold	Conservative	San Andrés and Providence
7th	July 20, 2006 – July 20, 2007	Alfredo Cuello Baute	Conservative	Cesar
7th	July 20, 2007 – July 20, 2008	Óscar Arboleda Palacio	Conservative	Antioquia
7th	July 20, 2008 – July 20, 2009	Germán Varón Cotrino	Radical Change	Bogotá, D.C.
7th	July 20, 2009 – July 20, 2010	Édgar Gómez Román	Liberal	Santander
8th	July 20, 2010 – July 20, 2011	Carlos Alberto Zuluaga	Conservative	Antoquia
8th	July 20, 2011 – July 20, 2012	Simón Gaviria Muñoz	Liberal	Bogotá, D.C.
8th	July 20, 2012 – July 20, 2013	Augusto Posada	Unionist	Antoquia
8th	July 20, 2013 – July 20, 2014	Hernán Penagos	Unionist	Caldas
9th	July 20, 2014 – July 20, 2015	Fabio Amín	Liberal	Córdoba
9th	July 20, 2015 – July 20, 2016	Alfredo Deluque	Unionist	La Guajira
9th	July 20, 2016 – July 20, 2017	Miguel Ángel Pinto	Liberal	Santander
9th	July 20, 2017 – July 20, 2018	Rodrigo Lara Restrepo	Radical Change	Bogotá, D.C.
10th	July 20, 2018 – July 20, 2019	Alejandro Carlos Chacón	Democratic Centre	North Santander
10th	July 20, 2019 – July 20, 2020	Carlos Cuenca	Radical Change	Guainía
10th	July 20, 2020 – July 20, 2021	Germán Blanco Álvarez	Conservative	Antioquia
10th	July 20, 2021 – July 20, 2022	Jennifer Arias	Democratic Centre	Meta
11st	July 20, 2022 – July 20, 2023	David Racero	Humane Colombia	Bogotá, D.C.
11st	July 20, 2023 – July 20, 2024	Andrés Calle	Liberal	Córdoba
11st	July 20, 2024 – July 20, 2025	Jaime Salamanca	Green Alliance	Boyacá
11st	July 20, 2025 – July 20, 2026	Julián López	Union Party for the People	Cauca Valley
12th	July 20, 2026 – Incumbent	Nicolás Barguil	Conservative	Córdoba

== See also ==
- List of presidents of the Senate of Colombia
- List of vice presidents of Colombia
- List of presidents of Colombia
- List of viceroys of New Granada
