= 10th Congress of Colombia =

10th legislative term of Colombia

←	9th	11th	→
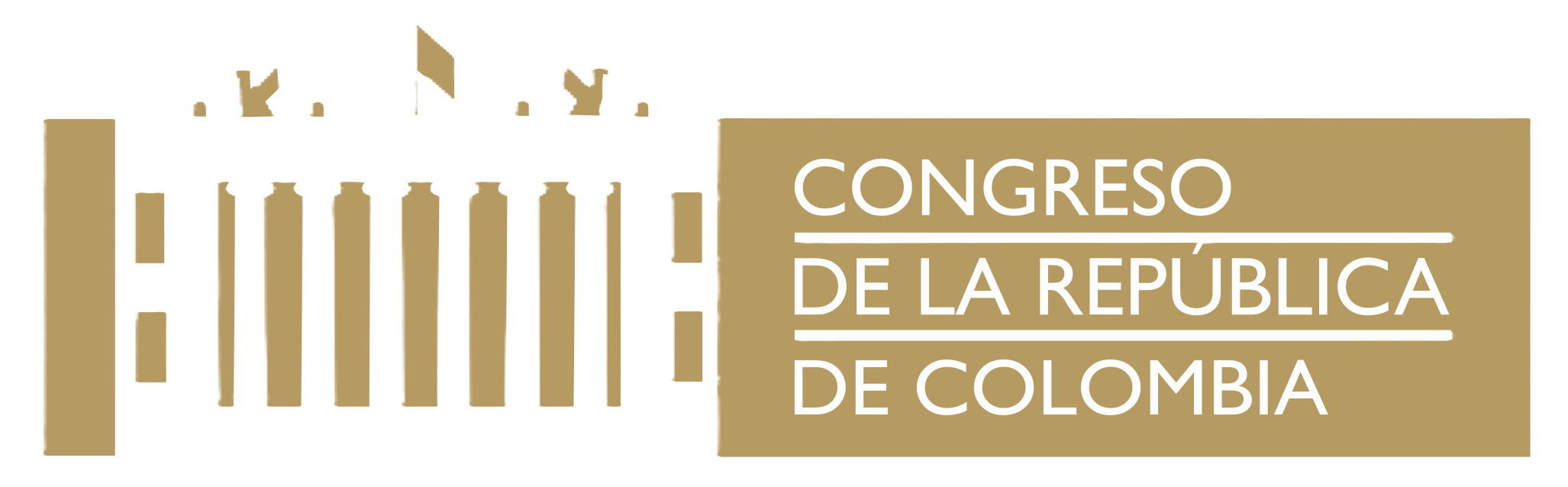

Overview
- Term: July 20, 2026 – July 20, 2030
- President: Abelardo de la Espriella
- Vice President: José Manuel Restrepo

Senate
- Members: 103
- President: Honorio Henríquez
- First Vice President: Manuel Antonio Virgüez
- Second Vice President: Alejandro Ocampo

Chamber of Representatives
- Members: 183
- President: Nicolás Barguil
- First Vice President: Simón Molina
- Second Vice President: Erick Velasco

The 10th Congress of Colombia, composed of the Senate and the Chamber of Representatives, is the current convocation of the legislative branch of the Republic of Colombia. It convened on July 20, 2026 in Bogotá. It will meet through the four-year term of the 36th President of Colombia Abelardo de la Espriella, ending on July 20, 2030. In total, it is composed of 103 senators and 183 representatives.

== Members ==
=== Senate ===
The following are the terms of the senators of this Congress, according to the date of election:

- For senators elected on March 8, 2026: July 20, 2026 – July 20, 2030

Senator	Party	Term	Term ending	Bloc	Registered in
Andrés Forero	Democratic Centre	1	2030	Government	Bogotá, D.C.
Rafael Nieto	Democratic Centre	1	2030	Government	Bogotá, D.C.
Claudia Margarita Zuleta	Democratic Centre	1	2030	Government	César
Hernán Cadavid	Democratic Centre	2	2030	Government	Antioquía
Julia Correa Nuttin	Democratic Centre	1	2030	Government	Antioquía
Carlos Meisel	Democratic Centre	2	2030	Government	Atlántico
Christian Garcés	Democratic Centre	1	2030	Government	Valle del Cauca
María Clara Posada	Democratic Centre	1	2030	Government	Santander
Honorio Henríquez	Democratic Centre	4	2030	Government	Magdalena
Alirio Barrera	Democratic Centre	2	2030	Government	Casanare
Esteban Quintero	Democratic Centre	2	2030	Government	Antioquía
Enrique Cabrales	Democratic Centre	1	2030	Government	Antioquía
Óscar Villamizar	Democratic Centre	2	2030	Government	Santander
Juan Fernando Espinal	Democratic Centre	1	2030	Government	Antioquía
María Angélica Guerra	Democratic Centre	2	2030	Government	Sucre
Juan Fernando Caicedo Callejas	Democratic Centre	2	2030	Government	Tolima
Zandra Bernal	Democratic Centre	2	2030	Government	Cundinamarca
Nadia Blel	Conservative	1	2030	Government	Bolívar
Wadith Manzur	Conservative	1	2030	Government	Córdoba
Daniel Restrepo	Conservative	1	2030	Government	Antioquía
David Barguil	Conservative	2	2030	Government	Córdoba
Miguel Ángel Barreto	Conservative	3	2030	Government	Tolima
Liliana Benavides	Conservative	1	2030	Government	Nariño
Marcos Daniel Pineda	Conservative	2	2030	Government	Córdoba
Luis Eduardo Díaz	Conservative	1	2030	Government	Santander
Juan Carlos García	Conservative	3	2030	Government	Norte de Santander
Santiago Barreto	Conservative	1	2030	Government	Tolima
Johnnatan Tamayo	Conservative	1	2030	Government	Meta
Norma Hurtado	Union Party for the People	2	2030	Government	Valle del Cauca
Juan Carlos Garcés	Union Party for the People	2	2030	Government	Valle del Cauca
Wilmer Carrillo	Union Party for the People	1	2030	Government	Norte de Santander
Alfredo Deluque	Union Party for the People	2	2030	Government	La Guajira
Jhony Besaile	Union Party for the People	2	2030	Government	Córdoba
Ana Paola García	Union Party for the People	1	2030	Government	Córdoba
María Irma Noreña	Union Party for the People	1	2030	Government	Risaralda
Antonio José Correa	Union Party for the People	3	2030	Government	Bolívar
Edgardo Espitia	Radical Change	1	2030	Government	Córdoba
José Gómez	Radical Change	1	2030	Government	Cundinamarca
Selmen Arana	Radical Change	1	2030	Government	Bolívar
Didier Lobo	Radical Change	2	2030	Government	Cesar
Gonzalo Baute	Radical Change	1	2030	Government	Atlántico
Carlos Farelo	Radical Change	2	2030	Government	Magdalena
Nelson López	Radical Change	1	2030	Government	Boyacá
Enrique Gómez Martínez	National Salvation Movement	1	2030	Government	Bogotá, D.C.
Sara Castellanos	National Salvation Movement	1	2030	Government	Bogotá, D.C.
Germán Rodríguez	National Salvation Movement	1	2030	Government	Cundinamarca
Alejandro Bermeo	National Salvation Movement	1	2030	Government	Huila
Ana Paola Agudelo	Independent Movement of Absolute Renovation	3	2030	Government	Tolima
Manuel Antonio Vírguez	Independent Movement of Absolute Renovation	3	2030	Government	Bogotá, D.C.
Carlos Guevara	Independent Movement of Absolute Renovation	2	2030	Government	Bogotá, D.C.
María Villalba	New Liberalism	1	2030	Government	Bogotá, D.C.
Lidio García	Liberal	3	2030	Independent	Bolívar
Yessid Pulgar	Liberal	1	2030	Independent	Atlántico
María Lopera	Liberal	1	2030	Independent	Antioquía
Alix Vargas	Liberal	1	2030	Independent	Norte de Santander
Gersson Vargas	Liberal	1	2030	Independent	Cundinamarca
Camilo Torres	Liberal	1	2030	Independent	Atlántico
Leonardo Gallego	Liberal	1	2030	Independent	Valle del Cauca
Óscar Sánchez	Liberal	1	2030	Independent	Cundinamarca
Héctor Espinosa	Liberal	1	2030	Independent	Sucre
Fabio Amín	Liberal	3	2030	Independent	Córdoba
Eduardo Enríquez	Independent Social Alliance	1	2030	Independent	Nariño
Gustavo Moreno	Independent Social Alliance	2	2030	Independent	Santander
Wilder Escobar	Independent Social Alliance	1	2030	Independent	Caldas
Luis Carlos Rúa	Independent Social Alliance	1	2030	Independent	Antioquía
Carolina Corcho	Historic Pact	1	2030	Opposition	Antioquía
Iván Cepeda (Note: He received the seat as the second-place presidential candidate in the 2026 presidential election)	Historic Pact	3	2030	Opposition	Bogotá, D.C.
Pedro Floréz	Historic Pact	1	2030	Opposition	Santander
Carmen Caicedo	Historic Pact	1	2030	Opposition	Bogotá, D.C.
Wilson Arias	Historic Pact	1	2030	Opposition	Norte de Santander
Laura Ahumada	Historic Pact	1	2030	Opposition	Cundinamarca
Walter "Wally" Rodríguez	Historic Pact	1	2030	Opposition	Bogotá, D.C.
Aída Avella	Historic Pact	3	2030	Opposition	Bogotá, D.C.
Ferney Silva	Historic Pact	1	2030	Opposition	Cundinamarca
Esmeralda Hernández	Historic Pact	2	2030	Opposition	Bogotá, D.C.
Carlos Alberto Benavides	Historic Pact	2	2030	Opposition	Nariño
Sandra Chindoy	Historic Pact	1	2030	Opposition	Putumayo
Jorge Ocampo	Historic Pact	1	2030	Opposition	Valle del Cauca
María Eugenia Londoño	Historic Pact	1	2030	Opposition	Risaralda
Alex Flórez	Historic Pact	2	2030	Opposition	Antioquía
Kamelia Zuluaga	Historic Pact	1	2030	Opposition	Antioquía
Agmeth Escaf	Historic Pact	2	2030	Opposition	Atlántico
Isabel Contreras	Historic Pact	1	2030	Opposition	Sucre
Kevin Gómez Paz	Historic Pact	1	2030	Opposition	Valle del Cauca
Isabel Zuleta	Historic Pact	2	2030	Opposition	Antioquía
Martín Carabalí	Historic Pact	2	2030	Opposition	Cauca
Deisy Johana Osorio	Historic Pact	1	2030	Opposition	La Guajira
David Racero	Historic Pact	2	2030	Opposition	Bogotá, D.C.
Alejandra Omaña	Historic Pact	1	2030	Opposition	Norte de Santander
Orlando De La Hoz	Historic Pact	1	2030	Opposition	Atlántico
Mary Jurado	Historic Pact	1	2030	Opposition	Cauca
Jonathan Pulido	Green Alliance	2	2030	Opposition	Santander
Andrea Padilla	Green Alliance	2	2030	Opposition	Bogotá, D.C.
John Amaya	Green Alliance	1	2030	Opposition	Boyacá
Ariel Ávila	Green Alliance	2	2030	Opposition	Bogotá, D.C.
Duvalier Sánchez	Green Alliance	1	2030	Opposition	Valle del Cauca
Jennifer Pedraza	Dignity and Commitment	1	2030	Opposition	Bogotá, D.C.
José Macea	En Marcha	1	2030	Opposition	Sucre
Luis Mejía	Democratic	1	2030	Opposition	Atlántico
Martha Peralta	Alternative Indigenous and Social Movement	2	2030	Opposition	La Guajira
José Tumbo	Alternative Indigenous and Social Movement	1	2030	Opposition	Cauca

=== Chamber of Representatives ===
Terms of members of the Chamber of Representatives began on July 20, 2026, and will end on July 20, 2030, unless stated otherwise.

Department	Representative	Party	Term	Bloc
Bogotá, D.C.	María Fernanda Carrascal	Historic Pact	2	Opposition
Bogotá, D.C.	Laura Beltrán	Historic Pact	1	Opposition
Bogotá, D.C.	María del Mar Pizarro	Historic Pact	2	Opposition
Bogotá, D.C.	Daniel Monroy	Historic Pact	1	Opposition
Bogotá, D.C.	Heráclito Landinez	Historic Pact	2	Opposition
Bogotá, D.C.	Claudia Romero	Historic Pact	1	Opposition
Bogotá, D.C.	Jairo Vargas	Historic Pact	1	Opposition
Bogotá, D.C.	Gabriel Becerra	Historic Pact	2	Opposition
Bogotá, D.C.	Daniel Briceño	Democratic Center	1	Government
Bogotá, D.C.	José Uscátegui	Democratic Center	2	Government
Bogotá, D.C.	Nelly Mosquera	Democratic Center	1	Government
Bogotá, D.C.	David Cote	Democratic Center	1	Government
Bogotá, D.C.	Luz Gordillo	Democratic Center	1	Government
Bogotá, D.C.	Jesús Lorduy	Democratic Center	1	Government
Bogotá, D.C.	Carlos Osorio	Democratic Center	2	Government
Bogotá, D.C.	Catherine Juvinao	Green Alliance	2	Opposition
Bogotá, D.C.	Mauricio Toro	Green Alliance	2	Opposition
Bogotá, D.C.	Carol Borda	National Salvation Movement	1	Government
Bogotá, D.C.	Bleidy Pérez	Liberal	1	Independent
Amazonas	Mónica Bocanegra	Liberal	2	Independent
Amazonas	Orlando Rayo	La Voz del Amazonas	1	Opposition
Antioquia	Andrés Guerra	Democratic Center	1	Government
Antioquia	José Orjuela	Democratic Center	1	Government
Antioquia	Melissa Orrego	Democratic Center	1	Government
Antioquia	Óscar Pérez	Democratic Center	2	Government
Antioquia	Ana Mora	Democratic Center	1	Government
Antioquia	Juan Zuluaga	Democratic Center	1	Government
Antioquia	Jhon Berrío	Democratic Center	2	Government
Antioquia	Hernán Muriel	Historic Pact	1	Opposition
Antioquia	Verónica Estrada	Historic Pact	1	Opposition
Antioquia	Alejandro Toro	Historic Pact	2	Opposition
Antioquia	Camilo Gómez	Liberal	1	Independent
Antioquia	Diver Franco	Liberal	1	Independent
Antioquia	Luis Patiño	Creemos	1	Government
Antioquia	Simón Molina	Creemos	1	Government
Antioquia	Jaime Cano	Conservative	1	Independent
Antioquia	Luis López	Conservative	2	Independent
Antioquia	Nataly Vélez	Radical Change	1	Independent
Arauca	Germán Rozo	Liberal	2	Opposition
Arauca	Manuel Pérez	Democratic Center	2	Government
Atlántico	Estefanel Gutiérrez	Radical Change	2	Government
Atlántico	Welfran Mendoza	Radical Change	2	Government
Atlántico	Samir Radi	Radical Change	2	Government
Atlántico	Jaime Santamaria	Historic Pact	2	Opposition
Atlántico	Andrea Vargas	Historic Pact	2	Opposition
Atlántico	Jezmi Barraza	Liberal	2	Opposition
Atlántico	Cesar Barrera	Liberal	2	Opposition
Bolívar	Yolanda Wong	Liberal	2	Opposition
Bolívar	Maria Salas	Conservative	2	Government
Bolívar	Juliana Aray	Conservative	2	Government
Bolívar	Andrés Montes	Conservative	2	Government
Bolívar	Amaury Pérez	Historic Pact	2	Opposition
Bolívar	José Ardila	Democratic Center (Note: This candidate also received support from the Independent Movement of Absolute Renovation (MIRA))	2	Government
Boyacá	Yamit Hurtado	Green Alliance	2	Opposition
Boyacá	Jaime Salamanca	Green Alliance	2	Opposition
Boyacá	Jose Bohórquez	Historic Pact	2	Opposition
Boyacá	Eduar Triana	Democratic Center	2	Government
Boyacá	Ingrid Sogamoso	Conservative (Note: This candidate also received support from the National Salvation Movement)	2	Government
Boyacá	Héctor Chaparro	Liberal	2	Opposition
Caldas	Santiago Osorio	Historic Pact (Note: This candidate also received support from the Green Alliance)	2	Opposition
Caldas	José Cardona	Liberal	2	Opposition
Caldas	Manuel Correa	Independent Social Alliance	2	Opposition
Caldas	Juan Londoño	Conservative	2	Government
Caldas	Mateo Hidalgo	Democratic Center (Note: This candidate also received support from the Union Party for the People)	2	Government
Caquetá	Juan Duque	Caquetá Coalition	2	Opposition
Caquetá	José Ramón	Radical Change (Note: This candidate also received support from the Independent Movement of Absolute Renovation (MIRA))	2	Government
Casanare	Arledy Alvarado	Democratic Center	2	Government
Casanare	Diego García	Green Alliance	2	Opposition
Cauca	Jorge Bastidas	Historic Pact	2	Opposition
Cauca	Aida Quilcué (Note: She received the seat as the second-place vice-presidential candidate in the 2026 presidential election.)	Alternative Indigenous and Social Movement	2	Opposition
Cauca	Luz Moncayo	Historic Pact	2	Opposition
Cauca	Edgar Gómez	Liberal	2	Opposition
Cauca	Victor Armero	Cauca Force	2	Opposition
Cesar	Alexandra Pineda	Historic Pact	2	Opposition
Cesar	Mello Castro	Liberal	2	Opposition
Cesar	Carlos Peña	Union Party for the People	2	Government
Cesar	Alfredo Cuello	Conservative	2	Government
Chocó	Omar Vidal	Liberal	2	Opposition
Chocó	Sandra Palacios	Liberal	2	Opposition
Córdoba	Juan Rangel	Reborn Colombia	2	Opposition
Córdoba	Martha Ruiz	Reborn Colombia	2	Opposition
Córdoba	Luis Ballesteros	Historic Pact	2	Opposition
Córdoba	Jose Olivera	Radical Change	2	Government
Córdoba	Nicolás Barguil	Conservative	2	Government
Cundinamarca	Heiner Gaitán	Historic Pact	2	Opposition
Cundinamarca	Francy Moreno	Historic Pact	2	Opposition
Cundinamarca	Yeisson Zapata	Historic Pact	2	Opposition
Cundinamarca	Hilda Gutiérrez	Democratic Center (Note: This candidate also received support from the Independent Movement of Absolute Renovation (MIRA))	2	Government
Cundinamarca	Dania Álvarez	Democratic Center (Note: This candidate also received support from the Independent Movement of Absolute Renovation (MIRA))	2	Government
Cundinamarca	Julio Salazar	Conservative	2	Government
Cundinamarca	Daniel Bernal	Democratic	2	Opposition
Guainía	Jhonn Molina	Union Party for the People	2	Government
Guainía	Carlos Cuenca	Radical Change	2	Government
Guaviare	Jorge Quevedo	Conservative	2	Government
Guaviare	Alexander Bermudez	Liberal	2	Opposition
Huila	Flora Perdomo	Liberal	2	Opposition
Huila	Lucy Bravo	Liberal	2	Opposition
Huila	Lourdes Mateus	Historic Pact	2	Opposition
Huila	Julio Triana	Radical Change	2	Government
La Guajira	Jorge Figueroa	Union Party for the People	2	Government
La Guajira	Juan Gómez	Conservative	2	Government
Magdalena	Kelyn González	Liberal	2	Opposition
Magdalena	Chadan Rosado	Democratic Center	2	Government
Magdalena	José Hernández	Historic Pact	2	Opposition
Magdalena	Elizabeth Molina	Broad Democratic Coalition for Peace	2	Opposition
Magdalena	Franklin Lozano	Conservative	2	Government
Meta	Daruin Castellanos	Democratic Center	2	Government
Meta	María Mayusa	Historic Pact	2	Opposition
Meta	Milton Carreño	Union Party for the People	2	Government
Nariño	Erick Velasco	Historic Pact	2	Opposition
Nariño	Rosita Guevara	Historic Pact	2	Opposition
Nariño	Christian Palacios	Historic Pact	2	Opposition
Nariño	Carlos Pantoja	Conservative	2	Government
Nariño	Julio Álvarez	Liberal	2	Opposition
Nariño	Alejandra Abasolo	Let's Move Forward Nariño	2	Opposition
Norte de Santander	José Duarte	Conservative	2	Government
Norte de Santander	Diana Riveros	Union Party for the People	2	Government
Norte de Santander	Luis Rodríguez	Liberal	2	Opposition
Norte de Santander	Juan Corzo	Democratic Center	2	Government
Norte de Santander	Eimy Suarez	Radical Change	2	Government
Putumayo	Miguel Rubio	Historic Pact (Note: This candidate also received support from the Green Alliance)	2	Opposition
Putumayo	Diego Zambrano	Conservative	2	Opposition
Quindío	Jesús Bedoya	Democratic Center (Note: This candidate also received support from the Conservative Party)	2	Government
Quindío	Miguel Grisales	Historic Pact	2	Opposition
Quindío	John Pérez	Radical Change	2	Government
Risaralda	Fernando Arias	Historic Pact	2	Opposition
Risaralda	Franyela Bermúdez	Radical Change (Note: This candidate also received support from the Union Party for the People)	2	Government
Risaralda	José Espinosa	Democratic Center (Note: This candidate also received support from the Independent Movement of Absolute Renovation (MIRA))	2	Government
Risaralda	José Arias	Liberal	2	Opposition
San Andrés and Providencia	Elizabeth Jay-Pang	Liberal	2	Opposition
San Andrés and Providencia	Jorge Méndez	Radical Change	2	Government
Santander	Camilo Torres	Historic Pact	2	Opposition
Santander	Yolanda Silva	Historic Pact	2	Opposition
Santander	Jonathan Pineda	Democratic Center	2	Government
Santander	Miguel Pinto	Democratic Center	2	Government
Santander	Diego Ariza	Union Party for the People	2	Government
Santander	Guillermo Blanco	Conservative	2	Government
Santander	Mario Carvajal	Liberal	2	Opposition
Sucre	Pedro Paternina	Liberal	2	Opposition
Sucre	Alejandro De la Ossa	The Force Party	2	Opposition
Sucre	Milene Jarava	Union Party for the People	2	Government
Tolima	Guillermo Alvira	Conservative	2	Government
Tolima	Delcy Isaza	Conservative	2	Government
Tolima	José Martínez	Conservative	2	Government
Tolima	Marco Hincapié	Historic Pact (Note: This candidate also received support from "Green Alliance")	2	Opposition
Tolima	Renzo García	Historic Pact (Note: This candidate also received support from "Green Alliance")	2	Opposition
Tolima	Carlos Osorio	Democratic Center	2	Government
Valle del Cauca	Alfredo Mondragón	Historic Pact	2	Opposition
Valle del Cauca	Ana Erazo	Historic Pact	2	Opposition
Valle del Cauca	Jorge Palacio	Historic Pact	2	Opposition
Valle del Cauca	Laura Vera	Historic Pact	2	Opposition
Valle del Cauca	Carlos Arizabaleta	Historic Pact	2	Opposition
Valle del Cauca	Paola Quiñones	Historic Pact	2	Opposition
Valle del Cauca	Víctor Salcedo	Union Party for the People	2	Government
Valle del Cauca	Luis Chávez	Union Party for the People	2	Government
Valle del Cauca	Santiago Castro	Democratic Center	2	Government
Valle del Cauca	Jaime Arizabaleta	Democratic Center	2	Government
Valle del Cauca	David Pinilla	Liberal	2	Opposition
Valle del Cauca	Hernando González	League of Rulers	2	Opposition
Valle del Cauca	Juan Rojas	Now Colombia	2	Opposition
Vaupés	Camilo Ávila	Union Party for the People	2	Government
Vaupés	Oscar Espinosa	Independent Social Alliance	2	Opposition
Vichada	Luis Álvarez	Liberal	2	Opposition
Vichada	Juan Londoño	Union Party for the People	2	Government
Citizens abroad	Pedro Alejandro Murcia Lamprea	Democratic Center	2	Government
Afro-Colombians	Benildo Estupiñan	Colombian Ecologist Party	2	Opposition
Afro-Colombians	Omar Bonilla	Expresión Afroambiental	2	Opposition
Indigenous peoples	Linderman Andrada	Alternative Indigenous and Social Movement	2	Opposition
Indigenous peoples	Carlos Calvo	Alternative Indigenous and Social Movement	2	Opposition
Raizal	Elizabeth Jay-Pang Díaz	Liberal	2	Opposition
