= List of current members of the Senate of Colombia =

This is a list of the current members of the Senate of Colombia for the 2022–2026 legislative period. Their term runs from 20 July 2022 to 19 July 2026.

The 9th Congress of the Republic of Colombia represents the legislative branch of the Republic of Colombia, it is bicameral comprising the Senate and the Chamber of Representatives, which meet in the country's capital of Bogotá. The Congress is composed of 108 senators and 187 representatives.

Article 144 of the Colombian Constitution of 1991 establishes the Congress to be the highest representative power in the Legislative body of the nation. According to this Article, the duties of this Congress include reforming the Constitution, writing and developing new laws, and enforcing political control upon the Government and its administration.

== 2022 Colombian parliamentary election ==
The most recent parliamentary elections in Colombia were held on 13 March 2022, where 289 members of the congress were elected.

== Leadership ==
The Board of Directors of the Senate is composed of a President and two Vice Presidents, nominated and elected separately by their peers for a period of one legislative year each, beginning on 20 July of each calendar year. The current leadership will end their tenure on 19 July 2023.

Office	Officer	Party
President of the Senate	Roy Barreras	Historic Pact for Colombia
First Vice President	Miguel Ángel Pinto	Liberal Party
Second Vice President	Honorio Henríquez	Democratic Center

== Senate of the Republic of Colombia ==
The elected 108 members of the Senate were distributed by party as per the following list. As per Organic Law 1921 of 2018, the runner-up for the final Presidential election is given an automatic seat into the Senate and its running mate into the Chamber of Representatives:

Senate of Colombia
Parties or Coalitions	Total votes	%	Seats
National List
Historic Pact for Colombia	2,800,730	17.35	20
Partido Conservador Colombiano	2,223,061	14.18	15
Partido Liberal Colombiano	2,100,083	13.39	14
Hope Center Coalition/ Alianza Verde	1,954,792	12.28	13
Centro Democrático	1,917,153	12.08	13
Partido Cambio Radical	1,610,651	10.22	11
Partido de la U	1,508,031	9.63	10
Comunes	24,862	0.19	5
Coalición MIRA / Colombia Justa Libres	578,195	3.64	4
Indigenous List
Movimiento Alternativo Indígena Social (MAIS)	85,795	25.09	1
Autoridades Indígenas de Colombia	61,913	18.10	1
Status as Presidential Opposition
Presidential Runner-up			1
Total seats			108
Sourceː Consejo Nacional Electoral

=== Party lists ===
Party or Coalition	#	Photo	Titular	Commission
Pacto Histórico (PH)	1		Gustavo Bolívar Moreno	President of the Third Commission
Pacto Histórico (PH)	2		María José Pizarro Rodríguez	First
Pacto Histórico (PH)	3		Alexander López Maya	First
Pacto Histórico (PH)	4		Aída Yolanda Avella Esquivel	Fourth
Pacto Histórico (PH)	5		Roy Leonardo Barreras Montealegre	First; President of the Senate and Congress (2022-2023)
Pacto Histórico (PH)	6		Martha Isabel Peralta Epieyú	Seventh
Pacto Histórico (PH)	7		Iván Cepeda Castro	Second
Pacto Histórico (PH)	8		Piedad Esneda Córdoba Ruíz	Seventh
Pacto Histórico (PH)	9		Pedro Hernando Flórez Porras	Sixth
Pacto Histórico (PH)	10		Isabel Cristina Zuleta López	Vice-president of the Fifth Commission
Pacto Histórico (PH)	11		Alex Xavier Flórez Hernandez	Sixth
Pacto Histórico (PH)	12		Clara Eugenia López Obregón	Third
Pacto Histórico (PH)	13		Robert Daza Guevara	Sixth
Pacto Histórico (PH)	14		Yuly Esmeralda Hernández Silva	Fifth
Pacto Histórico (PH)	15		Wilson Neber Arias Castillo	Fourth
Pacto Histórico (PH)	16		Gloria Inés Flórez Schneider	President of the Second Commission
Pacto Histórico (PH)	17		César Augusto Pachón Achury	Fifth
Pacto Histórico (PH)	18		Sandra Yaneth Jaimes Cruz	Vice-president of the Sixth Commission
Pacto Histórico (PH)	19		Paulino Riascos Riascos	President of the Fourth Commission
Pacto Histórico (PH)	20		Jahel Quiroga Carrillo	Second
Partido Conservador Colombiano (PC)	1		Nadia Georgette Blel Scaff	Seventh
Partido Conservador Colombiano (PC)	2		Carlos Andrés Trujillo González	President of the Sixth Commission
Partido Conservador Colombiano (PC)	3		Marcos Daniel Pineda García	Fifth
Partido Conservador Colombiano (PC)	4		Efraín José Cepeda Sarabia	Third
Partido Conservador Colombiano (PC)	5		Liliana Esther Bittar Castilla	President of the Third Commission
Partido Conservador Colombiano (PC)	6		Óscar Barreto Quiroga	First
Partido Conservador Colombiano (PC)	7		Diela Liliana Benavides Solarte	Fourth
Partido Conservador Colombiano (PC)	8		Óscar Mauricio Giraldo Hernández	Second
Partido Conservador Colombiano (PC)	9		Nicolás Albeiro Echeverry Alvarán	Second
Partido Conservador Colombiano (PC)	10		Juan Samy Merheg Marún	Fourth
Partido Conservador Colombiano (PC)	11		Germán Alcides Blanco Álvarez	First
Partido Conservador Colombiano (PC)	12		Juan Carlos García Gómez	First
Partido Conservador Colombiano (PC)	13		José Alfredo Marín Lozano	Seventh
Partido Conservador Colombiano (PC)	14		Miguel Ángel Barreto Castillo	Fifth
Partido Conservador Colombiano (PC)	15		Soledad Tamayo Tamayo	Sixth
Partido Liberal Colombiano (L)	1		Lidio Arturo García Turbay	Second
Partido Liberal Colombiano (L)	2		Juan Pablo Gallo Maya	Third
Partido Liberal Colombiano (L)	3		Karina Espinosa Oliver	Third
Partido Liberal Colombiano (L)	4		Alejandro Carlos Chacón Camargo	First
Partido Liberal Colombiano (L)	5		Fabio Raúl Amín Saleme	President of the First Commission
Partido Liberal Colombiano (L)	6		Miguel Ángel Pinto Hernández	Seventh; First Vice-president of the Senate (2022-2023)
Partido Liberal Colombiano (L)	7		Claudia María Pérez Giraldo	Fourth
Partido Liberal Colombiano (L)	8		Alejandro Alberto Vega Pérez	First
Partido Liberal Colombiano (L)	9		Juan Diego Echavarría Sánchez	Third
Partido Liberal Colombiano (L)	10		Jaime Enrique Durán Barrera	Fifth
Partido Liberal Colombiano (L)	11		John Jairo Roldán Avendaño	Fourth
Partido Liberal Colombiano (L)	12		Mauricio Gómez Amín	Third
Partido Liberal Colombiano (L)	13		Mario Alberto Castaño Pérez	Arrested and divested. Outcomes on the seat to be defined.
Partido Liberal Colombiano (L)	14		Laura Esther Fortich Sánchez	Vice-president of the Fourth Commission
sinmarco Coalición Alianza Verde-ASI	1		Jonathan Ferney Pulido Hernández	First
sinmarco Coalición Alianza Verde-ASI	2		Humberto de la Calle Lombana	First
sinmarco Coalición Alianza Verde-ASI	3		Ariel Ávila	First
sinmarco Coalición Alianza Verde-ASI	4		Angélica Lisbeth Lozano Correa	Fourth
sinmarco Coalición Alianza Verde-ASI	5		Inti Asprilla	President of the Fifth Commission
sinmarco Coalición Alianza Verde-ASI	6		Jairo Alberto Castellanos Serrano	Third
sinmarco Coalición Alianza Verde-ASI	7		Ana Carolina Espitia Pérez	Third
sinmarco Coalición Alianza Verde-ASI	8		Guido Echeverri Piedrahita	Sixth
sinmarco Coalición Alianza Verde-ASI	9		Andrea Padilla Villarraga	Fifth
sinmarco Coalición Alianza Verde-ASI	10		Edwing Fabián Díaz Plata	Vice-president of the Seventh Commission
sinmarco Coalición Alianza Verde-ASI	11		Gustavo Adolfo Moreno Hurtado	Sixth
sinmarco Coalición Alianza Verde-ASI	12		Sor Berenice Bedoya Pérez	Seventh
sinmarco Coalición Alianza Verde-ASI	13		Iván Leonidas Name Vásquez	Second
sinmarco Centro Democrático (CD)	2		María Fernanda Cabal Molina	First
sinmarco Centro Democrático (CD)	3		Josué Alirio Barrera	Seventh
sinmarco Centro Democrático (CD)	4		Andrés Guerra	Fifth
sinmarco Centro Democrático (CD)	5		Esteban Quintero Cardona	Sixth
sinmarco Centro Democrático (CD)	6		Paola Andrea Holguín Moreno	Second
sinmarco Centro Democrático (CD)	7		Paloma Susana Valencia Laserna	First
sinmarco Centro Democrático (CD)	8		Enrique Cabrales Baquero	Fourth
sinmarco Centro Democrático (CD)	9		Carlos Manuel Mesiel Vergara	Fourth
sinmarco Centro Democrático (CD)	10		Ciro Alejandro Ramírez Cortés	Third
sinmarco Centro Democrático (CD)	11		José Vicente Carreño Castro	Second
sinmarco Centro Democrático (CD)	12		Honorio Henríquez	Seventh; Second Vice-president of the Senate (2022-2023)
sinmarco Centro Democrático (CD)	13		Yenny Esperanza Rozo Zambrano	Fifth
sinmarco Cambio Radical (CR)	1		David Andrés Luna Sánchez	First
sinmarco Cambio Radical (CR)	2		Arturo Char Chaljub	Third
sinmarco Cambio Radical (CR)	3		Antonio Luis Zabaraín Guevara	Third
sinmarco Cambio Radical (CR)	4		Carlos Abraham Jiménez López	Fourth
sinmarco Cambio Radical (CR)	5		Edgar Jesús Díaz Contreras	Fifth
sinmarco Cambio Radical (CR)	6		Carlos Mario Farelo Daza	Fourth
sinmarco Cambio Radical (CR)	7		Jorge Enrique Benedetti Martelo	First
sinmarco Cambio Radical (CR)	8		Ana María Castañeda Gómez	Sixth
sinmarco Cambio Radical (CR)	9		Carlos Fernando Motoa Solarte	First
sinmarco Cambio Radical (CR)	10		José Luis Pérez Oyuela	Second
sinmarco Cambio Radical (CR)	11		Didier Lobo Chinchilla	Fifth
sinmarco Partido de la U (U)	1		Juan Carlos Garcés Rojas	Third
sinmarco Partido de la U (U)	2		Jhon Moisés Besaile Fayad	Fourth
sinmarco Partido de la U (U)	3		Norma Hurtado	President of the Seventh Commission
sinmarco Partido de la U (U)	4		José David Name Cardozo	Fifth
sinmarco Partido de la U (U)	5		Juan Felipe Lemos Uribe	Fourth
sinmarco Partido de la U (U)	6		Julio Elías Chagüi Florez	Sixth
sinmarco Partido de la U (U)	7		Alfredo Rafael Deluque Zuleta	First
sinmarco Partido de la U (U)	8		Brener León Zambrano Eraso	First
sinmarco Partido de la U (U)	9		José Alfredo Gnecco Zuleta	Third
sinmarco Partido de la U (U)	10		Antonio José Correa Jiménez	Second
sinmarco Comunes(FR)	1		Julián Gallo Cubillos	First
sinmarco Comunes(FR)	2		Sandra Ramírez Lobo Silva	Sixth
sinmarco Comunes(FR)	3		Pablo Catatumbo Torres Victoria	Fifth
sinmarco Comunes(FR)	4		Imelda Daza	Third
sinmarco Comunes(FR)	5		Omar de Jesús Restrepo Correa	Seventh
sinmarco sinmarco Nos Une Colombia (Colombia Justa Libres; MIRA)	1		Beatriz Lorena Ríos Cuéllar	Seventh
sinmarco sinmarco Nos Une Colombia (Colombia Justa Libres; MIRA)	2		Carlos Eduardo Guevara Villabón	Sixth
sinmarco sinmarco Nos Une Colombia (Colombia Justa Libres; MIRA)	3		Ana Paola Agudelo García	Seventh
sinmarco sinmarco Nos Une Colombia (Colombia Justa Libres; MIRA)	4		Manuel Antonio Virgüez Piraquive	Second
sinmarco Movimiento Alternativo Indígena y Social (MAIS) (Indigenous seat)	1		Aída Marina Quilcué Vivas	Vice-president of the First Commission
Autoridades Indígenas de Colombia (AICO) (Indigenous Seat)	1		Polivio Leandro Rosales Cadena	Seventh
sinmarco Liga de Gobernantes Anticorrupción (Presidential runner-up seat)	1		Rodolfo Hernández Suárez	First

== See also ==
- List of presidents of Colombia
- List of vice presidents of Colombia
