= Quiroga =

Quiroga may refer to:

== Places ==
- Quiroga, Bogotá, a neighborhood of Bogotá, Colombia
  - Quiroga (TransMilenio), a bus station
- Quiroga, Michoacán, Mexico
- Quiroga (comarca), Lugo province, Galicia, Spain
- Quiroga, Galicia, a municipality in Lugo province, Galicia, Spain
- Quiroga Ridge, Antarctica

== People ==
- Quiroga (surname)
