= Rodrigo Lara Restrepo =

Colombian politician (born 1975)

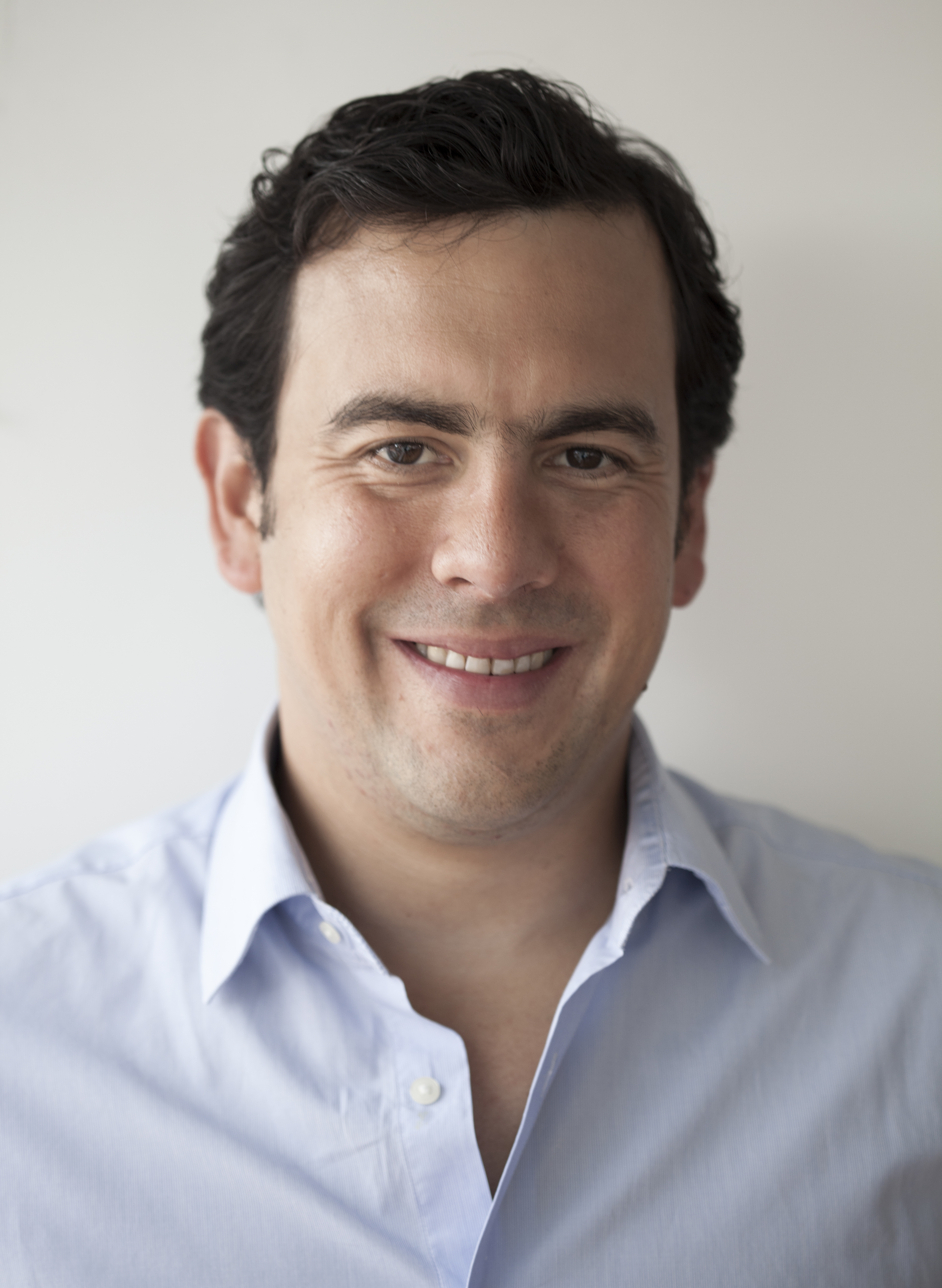
- Lara Restrepo in 2013

Minister of the Interior
- In office 7 August 2026 – 22 October 2026
- President: Abelardo de la Espriella
- Preceded by: Armando Benedetti
- Succeeded by: Alejandro Ordóñez

Director of the National Protection Unit
- Acting
- In office 11 August 2026 – 19 August 2026
- President: Abelardo de la Espriella
- Preceded by: Augusto Rodríguez
- Succeeded by: Didier Blanco

President of the Chamber of Representatives of Colombia
- In office 20 July 2017 – 20 July 2018
- Preceded by: Miguel Ángel Pinto
- Succeeded by: Alejandro Carlos Chacón

President of Radical Change
- In office 17 June 2015 – 17 March 2017
- Preceded by: Carlos Fernando Galán
- Succeeded by: Jorge Enrique Vélez

Senator of Colombia
- In office 20 July 2018 – 28 June 2022
- In office 21 August 2007 – 20 July 2010

Member of the Chamber of Representatives of Colombia
- In office 20 July 2014 – 20 July 2018
- Constituency: Bogotá

Director of the Presidential Program for Modernization, Efficiency, Transparency, and the Fight Against Corruption
- In office 24 March 2006 – 11 December 2007
- President: Álvaro Uribe
- Preceded by: Mauricio Cortes de los Ríos
- Succeeded by: Óscar Ortiz Gonzáles

Personal details
- Born: Rodrigo Lara Restrepo; 12 May 1975 (age 51) Neiva, Huila, Colombia
- Party: Radical Change (2006–2022)
- Spouse: María José Valenzuela
- Children: 1
- Parent: Rodrigo Lara Bonilla (father)
- Relatives: Rodrigo Lara Sánchez (brother)
- Education: Universidad Externado de Colombia; Sciences Po
- Occupation: Lawyer • Politician

Rodrigo Lara Restrepo (born 12 May 1975) is a Colombian lawyer and politician. A member of the Radical Change political party, he was President of the Chamber of Representatives between 2017 and 2018. In 2026, he was appointed Minister of the Interior by President Abelardo de la Espriella.

He is the son of Rodrigo Lara Bonilla, President Belisario Betancur's minister of justice who was assassinated in 1984.
