= Aurelio Iragorri =

Aurelio Iragorri is the name of:

- Aurelio Iragorri Hormaza, Colombian politician, father
- Aurelio Iragorri Valencia, Colombian politician, son
