= Jennifer Arias =

Colombian politician (born 1987)

President of the Chamber of Representatives
- In office 20 July 2021 – 20 July 2022
- Preceded by: Germán Blanco
- Succeeded by: David Racero

Member of the Chamber of Representatives
- In office 20 July 2015 – 20 July 2022
- Constituency: Meta

Personal details
- Born: Jennifer Kristin Arias Falla; 13 January 1987 (age 39) New York City, U.S.
- Party: Democratic Center
- Occupation: Politician

Jennifer Kristin Arias Falla (born 13 January 1987) is a Colombian politician who was President of the country's House of Representatives in 2021–2022.

== Early life and education ==
Arias was born in New York City, United States, on 13 January 1987 to contractor Luis Eduardo Arias Castellanos and Laura Falla Londoño. The names "Jennifer Kristin" were given by the nurse who attended her mother's Caesarean section. She has six brothers; her father was convicted of murder in 1993. A construction worker and cattle rancher, he was a victim of extortion and displacement by FARC when Arias was 14.

Arias studied industrial engineering at the University of Los Andes and has a master's degree in Government and Public Policy from the Universidad Externado de Colombia. On 2 November 2021, following a report of plagiarism by the website Plagio S.O.S. in her master's thesis, Universidad Externado opened an investigation. Later, on 22 November 2021 the university confirmed plagiarism in her dissertation . The university stated that it will pursue the annulation of the aforementioned degree, and sent the relevant documentation to the criminal chamber of the Supreme Court of Justice of Colombia and the Office of the Attorney General of Colombia.

Arias was "Miss Meta" at the Miss Colombia 2007 pageant.

== Career ==
Arias worked as an advisor to the Secretary of Agriculture in Meta and social manager of Aguas de Bogota. She has also been a lobbyist for the aviation industry.

Arias has a member of the Democratic Center Party since its founding and was its director in Meta. She was a candidate for Mayor of Villavicencio in the 2015 regional elections. She was a member of a consortium who had a 214 million peso contract for the construction of various public spaces in the capital of Meta which had been extended until December 2014, and ran for mayor despite a law that establishes candidates cannot have a contract with the state for one year prior to an election.

Arias worked for Iván Duque Márquez's campaign during the 2018 presidential election, leading his campaigns in the departments of Vaupes and Guaviare. She was elected to the House of Representatives in 2018, representing Meta. In 2019, when former rebel Jesús Santrich was sworn into the house, Arias left the chamber in protest after talking about a member of her family being killed during the conflict.

Under political agreements made in 2018 as part of the Colombian peace process, the Democratic Center Party would hold the presidency of the House of Representatives from 2021 to 2022. Arias was selected as the party's candidate by party leader and former President Álvaro Uribe, who she describes as her mentor.

In July 2021, her election as President of the House of Representatives was ratified, making her the third woman to hold the role. She is also Vice President of the Congress of the Republic. Her appointment was criticized by members of the opposition because her brother is imprisoned in the United States for drug trafficking and allegations that she had ties to drug trafficking and money laundering while working as Duque's campaign manager. After her election, journalist Maria Jimena Duzan published an image of Arias posing with a gun; her press team said it was a "Halloween prank". Arias later said it was an example of women in Colombian politics being stigmatized because of their appearance.

In September 2021, fellow party member and representative Gabriel Santos put "Wanted posters" of Arias throughout Congress after she had delayed signing legislation to cut vacations of members of congress for its work to progress.

== Personal life ==
Arias is a committed Catholic.
