= List of the Colombian representatives from Córdoba =

The following is an alphabetical list of the members of the Chamber of Representatives of Colombia from the department of Córdoba. The name list should be complete, but other data may be incomplete.

== Current representatives ==
- Andrés Calle (L) (since 2018)
- Wadith Manzur (C) (since 2018)
- Nicolás Barguil (C) (since 2022)
- Saray Robayo (U) (since 2022)
- Ana Paola García (U) (since 2022)

== List of members ==
Member	Years	Party
Manzur Wadith	July 20, 2018 – July 20, 2026	Conservative
Calle Andrés	July 20, 2018 – May 7, 2025	Liberal
Robayo Saray	July 20, 2022 – July 20, 2026	Unionist
Ana Paola García	July 20, 2022 – July 20, 2026	Unionist
David Barguil	July 20, 2010 – July 20, 2018	Conservative
Fabio Amín	July 20, 2006 – July 20, 2014	Liberal
Sara Piedrahíta Lyons	July 20, 2014 – July 20, 2022	Unionist
Dumith Nader	July 20, 2006 – July 20, 2010	Liberal
Musa Besayle	July 20, 2006 – July 20, 2010	Liberal
Bernardo Elías	July 20, 2006 – July 20, 2010	Unionist
José de los Santos Negrete	July 20, 2006 – July 20, 2010	Conservative
Elías Méndez	July 20, 2010 – July 20, 2014	Unionist
Nicolás Jimenéz	July 20, 2010 – July 20, 2014	Unionist
Raymundo Mendez	July 20, 2014 – July 20, 2018	Unionist
Eduardo José Tous	July 20, 2014 – July 20, 2018	Unionist
Jorge Burgos	July 20, 2018 – July 20, 2022	Unionist
Erasmo Zuleta	July 20, 2018 – July 20, 2022	Unionist
Zulema Jattin Corrales	July 20, 1998 – July 20, 2006	Unionist
Alfonso de la Espriella	July 20, 1994 – July 20, 2002	Liberal
Francisco Jattin	July 20, 1982 – July 20, 1994	Liberal
Julio Manzur	July 20, 1991 – July 20, 1994	Conservative
Edmundo López	July 20, 1974 – July 20, 1990	Liberal

== See also ==
- Congress of Colombia
- Chamber of Representatives of Colombia
