= Wadith Manzur =

Colombian politician (born 1993)

The Honourable Wadith Manzur

Senator-elect of Colombia
- Incumbent
- Assumed office July 20, 2026

Member of the Chamber of Representatives
- In office July 20, 2018 – July 20, 2026
- Constituency: Córdoba

Personal details
- Born: Wadith Alberto Manzur Imbett; October 15, 1986 (age 39) Montería, Córdoba, Colombia
- Party: Conservative (2018-present)
- Parent(s): Julio Manzur (father); Carmen Imbett (mother)
- Education: University of the Andes (BIE); Universidad Externado de Colombia (BPM)
- Website: Chamber website

Wadith Alberto Manzur Imbett (born October 15, 1986) is a Colombian politician and industrial engineer. Under arrest by order of the Colombian Supreme Court of Justice since March 11, 2026 for bribery. Has been a representative for Córdoba in the Chamber of Representatives of Colombia since July 20, 2018.

== Life ==
Manzur Imbett was born on October 15, 1985, in Montería, Colombia. This father is former senator Julio Manzur. He attained his master's degree at Universidad Externado de Colombia and his postgraduate degree at Universidad Camilo José in Madrid, Spain

== Arrest ==
Colombian Supreme Court of Justice ordered Wadith Manzur arrest on March 11, 2026 for bribery in the scandal of Unidad Nacional de Gestión de Riesgo. (UNGRD). The evidence that the court has indicates that Manzur would have accepted bribes in exchange for his positive vote on the public credit commission. Corte Suprema pide capturar a cinco congresistas por el caso de la UNGRD.
