= Germán Blanco Álvarez =

Colombian politician

President of the Chamber of Representatives
- In office July 20, 2020 – July 19, 2021
- Preceded by: Carlos Alberto Cuenca
- Succeeded by: Jennifer Arias

Member of the Chamber of Representatives
- Incumbent
- Assumed office July 20, 2010
- Constituency: Antioquia

Personal details
- Born: Germán Blanco Álvarez; November 6, 1965 (age 60) Medellín, Antioquia, Colombia
- Party: Conservative
- Occupation: Politician and Lawyer

Germán Blanco Álvarez (born November 6, 1965) is a Colombian politician, lawyer and professor. He is a member of the Chamber of Representatives of Colombia representing Antioquia. Álvarez was President of the Chamber of Representatives of Colombia from 2020 to 2021.

== Biography ==
Blanco Álvarez was born on November 6, 1965. He grew up in the Boyacá Las Brisas neighborhood of Medellín. Álvarez attended the Universidad Autónoma Latinoamericana and studied law. He subsequently graduated with an LL.B in Law. He also attended the University of Medellín and studied Government and Public Relations. Álvarez has a Diploma in Democracy and Leadership from Israel.

German Álvarez started his career as an official at the Medellín judicial branch between 1988 and 1991. Subsequently, after serving in the judiciary he was appointed Secretary of Government in Támesis between 1992 and 1993. In 2001, he was the Deputy in the Assembly of Antioquia till 2007. In 2010, he was elected into the Chamber of Representatives of Colombia. He was appointed the First Vice President of the Chamber in 2013. During his two terms in the House of Representatives, he has presented 29 Bills, of which 23 are Co-authored and 6 Authorship. He has cited 5 group discussions and 5 on a private initiative.
