= Jaime Salamanca =

Colombian politician (born 1979)

The Honourable Jaime Salamanca
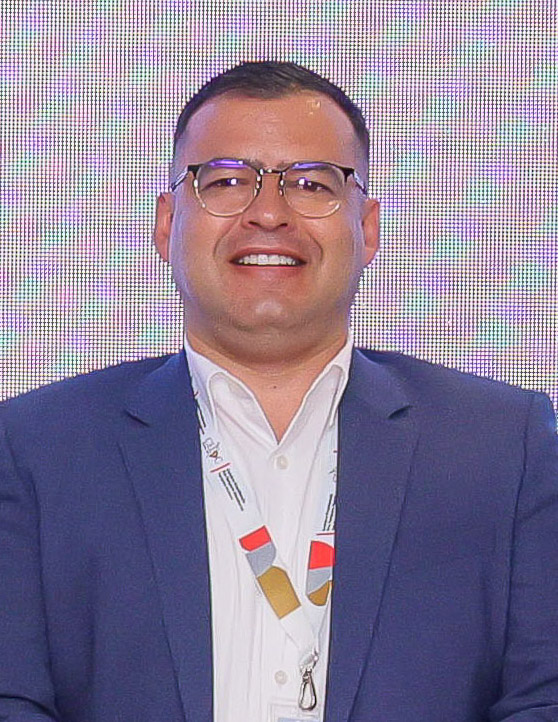

President of the Chamber of Representatives of Colombia
- In office 20 July 2024 – 20 July 2025
- Preceded by: Andrés Calle
- Succeeded by: Julián David López

Member of the Chamber of Representatives of Colombia
- Incumbent
- Assumed office 20 July 2022
- Constituency: Boyacá

Personal details
- Born: Jaime Raúl Salamanca Torres; December 15, 1979 (age 46) Sotaquirá, Boyacá, Colombia
- Party: Green Alliance
- Education: Pedagogical and Technological University of Colombia; University of Santo Tomas; University of the Andes
- Website: Chamber website

Jaime Raúl Salamanca Torres (born 15 December 1979) is a Colombian politician who has been President of the Chamber of Representatives of Colombia since 2024, and in the chamber as a member of the Green Alliance since 2022. Prior to his tenure in the chamber he was a member of the Boyacá Assembly.

== Early life and education ==
Jaime Raúl Salamanca Torres was born in Sotaquirá, Colombia, on 15 December 1979. He graduated from the Pedagogical and Technological University of Colombia with a degree in public accounting, from the University of Santo Tomas with a degree in government and territorial management, and from the University of the Andes with a degree in regional development management.

== Career ==
At the Technological Pedagogical University of Colombia Salamanca was a student leader and was elected to the Academic Council. He ran for the governorship in the 2019 election, but the Green Alliance selected Ramiro Barragán instead.

In the 2011 election Salamanca won a seat in the Boyacá Assembly and was the only member of the opposition. He spent 65 million pesos on his reelection campaign in 2015 using money that solely came from him, his partner, and his brother. He was reelected in 2018 after spending almost 300 million pesos, with over 200 million pesos coming from private donors and the remainder coming from the Green Alliance.

In the 2022 election Salamanca was elected to the Chamber of Representatives of Colombia. On 20 July 2024, Salamanca defeated Katherine Miranda to become President of the chamber by a vote of 114 to 69.

== Works cited ==
=== News ===
- "Jaime Raúl Salamanca". La Silla Vacía. 20 July 2024. Archived from the original on 1 July 2025.

=== Web ===
- "Colombia". Inter-Parliamentary Union. Archived from the original on 1 July 2025.
- "Jaime Raúl Salamanca Torres". Chamber of Representatives of Colombia. Archived from the original on 1 July 2025.

Political offices
Preceded by Andrés Calle	President of the Chamber of Representatives; 2024–2025	Succeeded by Julián David López
Order of precedence
Preceded by Jaime Rodríguez as President of the Council of State	Order of precedence of Colombia as President of the Chamber of Representatives since July 20, 2024	Succeeded by Aurelio Rodríguez as President of the Superior Council of Judicature
