= Alfredo Deluque =

Colombian politician (born 1977)

The Honourable Alfredo Deluque
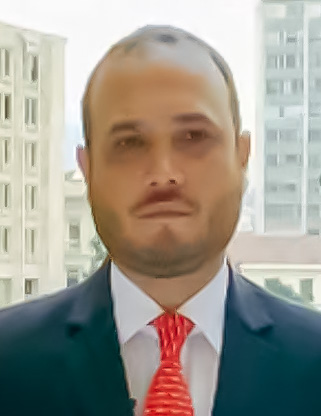
- Deluque in 2023.

Senator of Colombia
- Incumbent
- Assumed office July 20, 2022

President of the Chamber of Representatives
- In office July 20, 2015 – July 20, 2016
- Preceded by: Fabio Amín
- Succeeded by: Miguel Ángel Pinto

Member of the Chamber of Representatives
- In office July 20, 2010 – July 20, 2022
- Constituency: La Guajira

Personal details
- Born: Alfredo Rafael Deluque Zuleta; February 21, 1977 (age 49) Riohacha, La Guajira, Colombia
- Party: Union Party for the People (2010-present)
- Spouse: Vanessa Spath (m. 2016)
- Education: Universidad Externado de Colombia (LLB)

Alfredo Rafael Deluque Zuleta (born February 21, 1977) is a Colombian lawyer and politician who has served as Senator of Colombia since 2022. A member of the Union Party for the People, Deluque previously served as President of the Chamber of Representatives.

Born in Riohacha, La Guajira, he holds a law degree from Universidad Externado de Colombia. In 2010, he was elected to the Chamber of Representatives, a position he held until 2022. He was elected senator in 2022 and re-elected in 2026.

== Early life and career ==
Alfredo Rafael Deluque Zuleta was born on February 21, 1977, in Riohacha, La Guajira. He completed his secondary education at the Gimnasio Cerromar school in Riohacha.

He later moved to Bogotá, D.C., where he began studying law at the Universidad Externado de Colombia. He graduated as a lawyer in 2000. In 2001, he began a specialization in Telecommunications Law.

Deluque holds a Master's degree in Economic Law with an emphasis on International Law, which he obtained in 2022 while serving as representative for La Guajira in the Chamber of Representatives.

Political offices
Preceded by Fabio Amín	President of the Chamber of Representatives; 2015-2016	Succeeded by Miguel Ángel Pinto
