= Alejandra Omaña =

Colombian senator (born 1992)

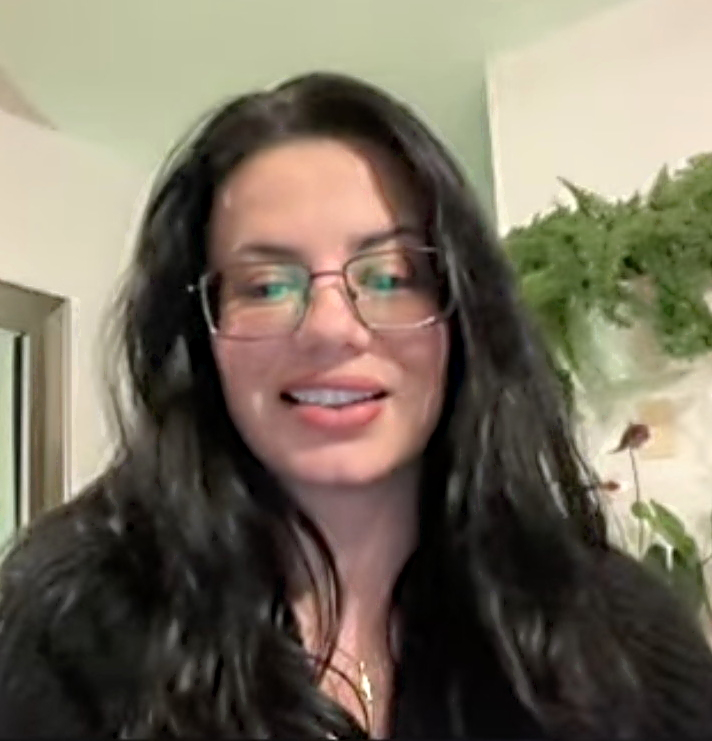
- Omaña in 2025

Senator of Colombia
- Incumbent
- Assumed office July 20, 2026
- Constituency: Norte de Santander

Personal details
- Born: September 4, 1992 (age 34) Cúcuta, Norte de Santander, Colombia
- Party: Historic Pact
- Spouse: David Ortiz (m. 2021)
- Occupation: Politician, activist
- Other names: Amaranta Hank

Deyci Alejandra Omaña Ortiz (born September 4, 1992), also known as Amaranta Hank, is a Colombian politician and former adult film actress. She began serving as a member of the Senate of Colombia in the 10th Congress of Colombia on July 20, 2026.

== Life and career ==
Deyci Alejandra Omaña Ortiz was born in Cúcuta on September 4, 1992. She took a post as a sports journalist covering soccer before attracting fame in 2015 after pledging to pose for a nude photo spread if Cúcuta Deportivo were promoted from Categoría Primera B to Liga DIMAYOR. She then worked as a porn star between 2017 and 2019 under the name Amaranta Hank. While in the industry, she pledged to film a gangbang if Gustavo Petro won the 2018 Colombian presidential election, though this was won by Ivan Duque Marquez.

In early 2019, an unverified rumor regarding the health of a co-worker prompted Omaña to receive large amounts of abuse and attempt suicide. She then started teaching pornography classes at a Medellín adult entertainment club. In September 2020, she accused a journalist of sexually harassing her in 2017, though he was acquitted in March 2024 after the judge applied in dubio pro reo. Omaña married David Ortiz, the son of actor and director Alfonso Ortiz, in January 2021.

After spending several months serving as a deputy minister of Colombia's Ministry of Equality under President Gustavo Petro, Omaña was the 23rd of 25 Historic Pact coalition candidates to secure a Senate seat in the March 2026 parliamentary elections, having used her campaign to campaign against whorephobia. She was officially sworn into office on July 20, 2026, representing the Norte de Santander department for the 2026–2030 parliamentary term.

== Works ==
- Relatos de frontera (2017) ISBN 978-958-562436-8
- "Tierra húmeda" in Cuerpos: veinte formas de habitar el mundo (2019) ISBN 978-958-427797-8
