= Quiroga (surname) =

Quiroga is a Galician surname; it originates from the valley and locality of Quiroga in the province of Lugo in the Galician region of Spain. Legend has it that in the year 715, a powerful knight defended the entrance to Galicia through the Valley of Quiroga from invasion by the Moors. As weapons, he used iron-tipped stakes which are the basis for the Quiroga coat-of-arms; five silver stakes (spears) positioned vertically on a green (sinople) background.

The first recorded name of the Quiroga lineage is that of Vasco De Quiroga born in the year 1218 during the reign of Ferdinand III of Castile, in the Valley of Quiroga. Branches from the house of Vasco De Quiroga extended through the districts of Monforte, Mondoñedo, Chantada, Quiroga, Lugo, and Sarria. New houses were established in these areas and also in the municipalities of Panton, Lancara, and Cesuras; the parishes of Espasantes, Carballedo, and Lamela; and extending through the regions of A Coruña and León in northern Spain.

Some students of Judaism in Galicia point out that the name Quiroga originated from the flower in Galicia that's called Queiroga by Sephardic Jews to avoid persecution during the Inquisition.

== Notable Quirogas ==
- Fray Alvaro de Quiroga, Abbot of the Monastery of Samos
- Elena Quiroga (1921–1995), writer, winner of Premio Nadal
- Facundo Hernán Quiroga, Argentine professional footballer
- Gaspar Rodríguez de Quiroga, Archbishop of Toledo, advisor to King Philip II of Spain and Grand Chancellor of Spain
- Helen de Quiroga (born 1964), Spanish singer and actress
- Horacio Quiroga (1878–1937), author of The Decapitated Chicken, The Exile, and others
- Jahel Quiroga
- Jorge Quiroga Ramírez, Bolivian politician and former Vice-President and then President of Bolivia.
- Juan Facundo Quiroga (1790–1835), Argentine leader of the Andean provinces
- Luis Ortiz Quiroga (1934–2025), Chilean lawyer
- Manuel Quiroga (violinist) (1892–1961), Spanish (Galician) violinist, composer and artist
- Manuel Quiroga (composer) (1899–1988), pianist, composer and author
- Raúl Quiroga, Argentine volleyball player who won the bronze medal at the 1988 Summer Olympics
- Ramon Quiroga, Argentine-Peruvian footballer, 1978 Peruvian World Cup player
- Robert Quiroga (1969–2004), American boxer
- Robert Quiroga (gridiron football) (born 1982), American player of gridiron football
- Rodrigo Quiroga, Argentine volleyball player, national team captain
- Rodrigo de Quiroga, Captain General, Governor, Mayor of Chile
- Rodrigo Lopez de Quiroga, governor of Milan
- Sebastián Quiroga Manríquez, constructor, Talca, Chile.(Nacido 1990).
- Ruy Vázquez de Quiroga, Grand Master of the Order of Alcántara
- Vasco de Quiroga, First Bishop of Michoacán (Mexico)
- Arantza Quiroga
- Yolanda Quiroga, Bogotá, Colombia
- Yvette Quiroga, first female Latina mayor of Mendota
- Raymunda Torres y Quiroga, 19th-century Argentine writer and women's rights activist

== Quirogas and the New World ==
A notable Quiroga in the history of New Spain was Bishop Vasco de Quiroga (1470–1565). He was famous for his personal crusade to aid the conquered peoples of Mexico.

Rodrigo De Quiroga Lopez De Sober (1512) traveled to Chile in an expedition of conquest in the year 1540. He became one of the founders of the city of Santiago. He served the role of Mayor of Santiago in 1548, 1558, and 1560. He Founded the Convent of Merced as a burial site for his future descendants and families. Rodrigo held many titles throughout his later years and died on February 25, 1580. He had an illegitimate daughter by the name of Isabel De Quiroga. He later married the mother Inés Suarez who was the first Spanish woman to arrive in Chile. Inés had been the faithful companion of Pedro Valdivia who led the expedition to Chile in 1540.

Several Quirogas traveled to Chile in expeditions and later the house of Quiroga expanded through Chile as many of those travelers settled and created new branches. The most well known was Rodrigo De Quiroga, Mayor of Santiago in the late 16th century. Many Quirogas in Chile followed in his footsteps and became mayors of other cities throughout Chile in the 17th century.

In 1557 Juan De Losada y Quiroga traveled to Chile and became Governor of Ciudad De Los Confines (1560–1563), Constable Major of Santiago (1566). He was knighted to Knight of the Order of Santiago. As a general, he commanded the 500 reinforcements in the Battle of Arauco (1574) and died on May 19, 1575, aboard the ship Angel Gabriel in the gulf of the Island of Santo Domingo en route to Chile.

His nephew Nicolás De Quiroga was on that expedition of 1575. Nicolás was promoted to the rank of captain in 1579, 2nd lieutenant major in 1580, and later served as a High Justice. He was married in 1581 to Ana Farra Ferris De Gamboa, and the two of them helped to propagate the Quiroga name throughout Chile. Nicolás was also a patron to the Convent of Merced.

Another notable Quiroga was born in 1878 in the river town of Salto, Uruguay; his name was Horacio Quiroga. By the year 1900, the 22-year-old was already published in various literary journals. Horacio published many stories, including the following English translated anthologies The Decapitated Chicken and Other Stories, South American Jungle Tales, and The Exile and Other Stories. Horacio was operated for prostate cancer in late 1936 and committed suicide a few months later.
