= Francisco Jattin =

Colombian politician and diplomat

Senator of Colombia
- In office 20 July 1994 – 14 May 1996

Member of the Chamber of Representatives
- In office 1 December 1991 – 20 July 1994
- Constituency: Córdoba
- In office 20 July 1982 – 8 March 1991
- Constituency: Córdoba

President of the Chamber of Representatives
- In office 20 July 1993 – 20 July 1994
- Preceded by: César Pérez García
- Succeeded by: Álvaro Benedetti Vargas
- In office 20 July 1987 – 20 July 1989
- Preceded by: Román Gómez Ovalle
- Succeeded by: Norberto Morales Ballesteros

Colombia Ambassador to Panama
- In office 8 March 1991 – 14 June 1991
- President: César Gaviria
- Preceded by: Jaime Hernández López
- Succeeded by: Alfonso Araújo Cotes

Mayor of Lorica
- In office 1970–1971

Personal details
- Born: Francisco José Jattin Safar Lorica, Córdoba, Colombia
- Died: 15 May 2009 Lorica, Córdoba, Colombia
- Party: Liberal
- Spouse: Ema Corrales
- Children: Zulema; Francisco

Francisco José Jattin Safar (died May 15, 2009) was a Colombian politician and diplomat. He was Senator of Colombia from 1994 to 1996, when he lost his seat in Congress for his connection to the proceso 8000. Jattin also served as Chamber Representative for Córdoba, where he was President of the Chamber for three terms.
