= Saray Robayo =

Colombian politician (born 1993)

The Honourable Saray Robayo

Member of the Chamber of Representatives
- Incumbent
- Assumed office July 20, 2022
- Constituency: Córdoba

Personal details
- Born: Saray Elena Robayo Bechara; November 24, 1993 (age 32) Montería, Córdoba, Colombia
- Party: Union Party for the People (2015-present)
- Relatives: Elías Bechara Zainúm (grandfather); Erasmo Zuleta (cousin)
- Education: Sinú University
- Website: Chamber website

Saray Elena Robayo Bechara (born November 24, 1993) is a Colombian former beauty queen, politician, lawyer and specialist in Constitutional Law. Has been a representative for Córdoba in the Chamber of Representatives since July 20, 2022.
