= Andrés Calle =

Colombian politician (born 1991)

The Honourable Andrés Calle
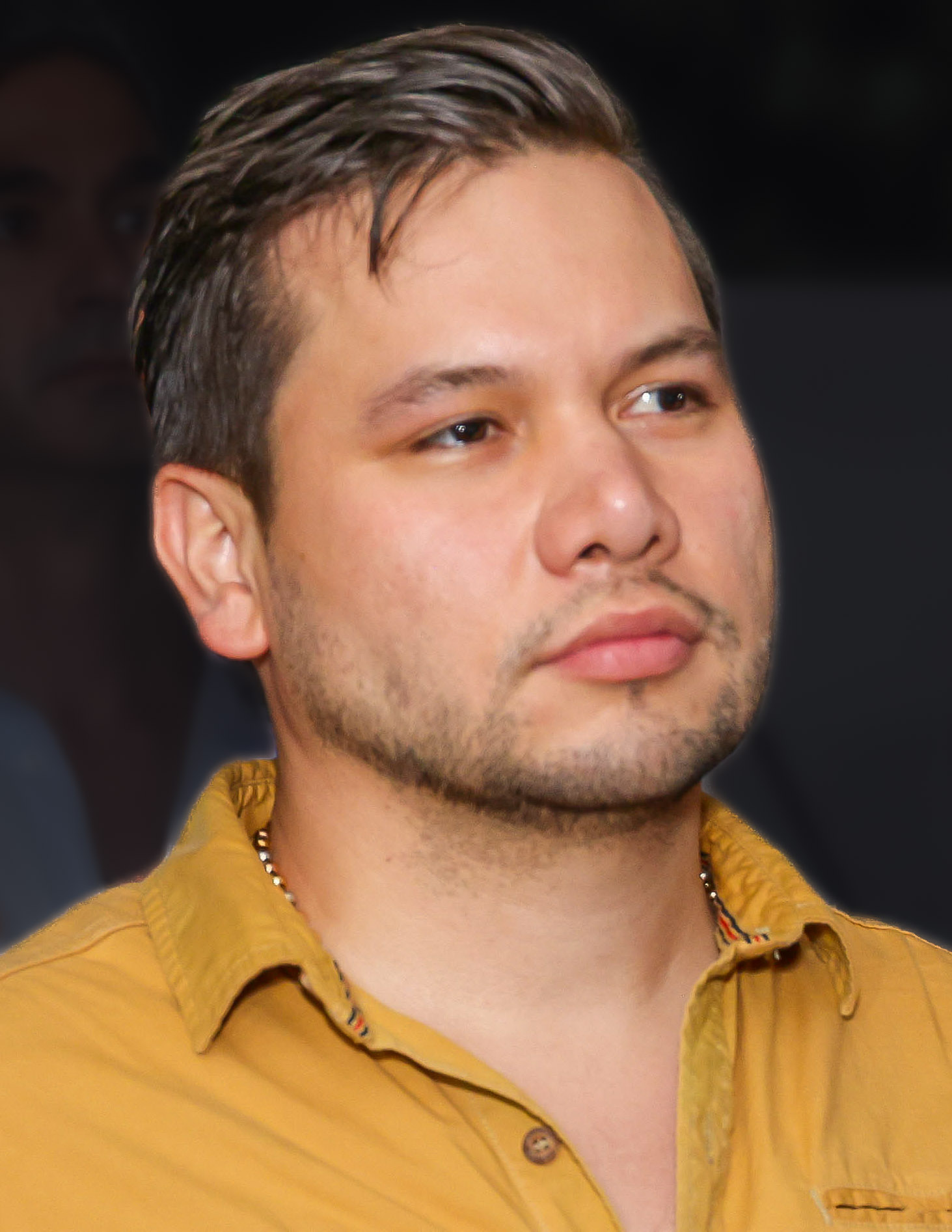
- Calle in c. March 2024

President of the Chamber of Representatives
- In office July 20, 2023 – July 20, 2024
- Preceded by: David Racero
- Succeeded by: Jaime Salamanca

Member of the Chamber of Representatives
- Incumbent
- Assumed office July 20, 2018
- Constituency: Córdoba

Personal details
- Born: Andrés David Calle Aguas; October 27, 1991 (age 34) Montelíbano, Córdoba, Colombia
- Party: Liberal
- Education: Autonomous University of Colombia
- Website: Chamber website

Andrés David Calle Aguas (born November 27, 1991) is a Colombian politician and lawyer who served as President of the Chamber of Representatives from 2023 to 2024. A member of the Liberal Party, Calle studied law at the Pontifical Bolivarian University.

Born in Montelíbano, Córdoba, he holds a specialization in public contracting from the Universidad Externado de Colombia and a master's degree in territorial planning from the University of Barcelona.

Political offices
Preceded by David Racero	President of the Chamber of Representatives; 2023–2024	Succeeded by Jaime Salamanca
