= Julián López (politician) =

Colombian politician (born 1984)

The Honourable Julián López
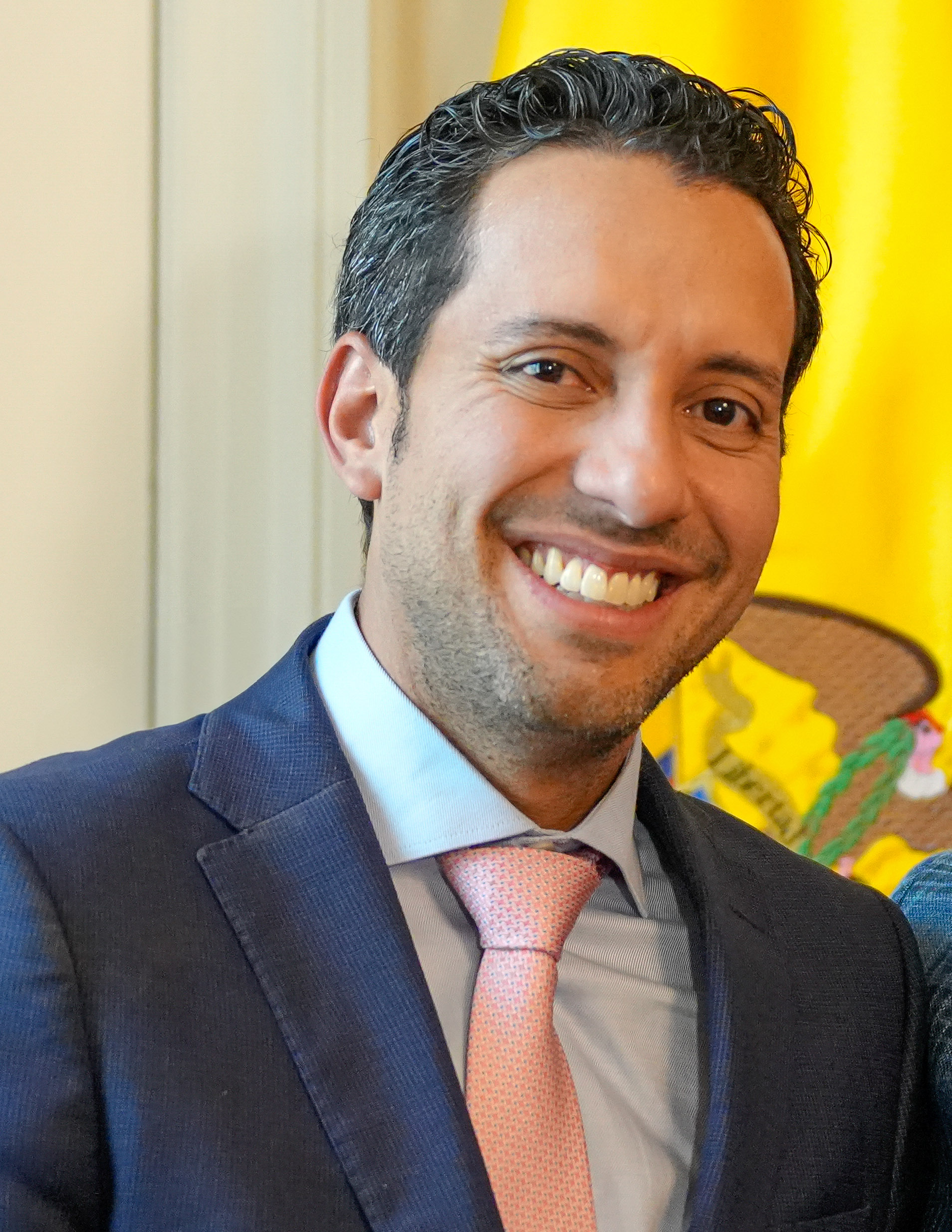
- López in 2025

President of the Chamber of Representatives
- In office 20 July 2025 – 20 July 2026
- Preceded by: Jaime Salamanca
- Succeeded by: Nicolás Barguil

Member of the Chamber of Representatives
- Incumbent
- Assumed office 20 July 2022
- Constituency: Cauca Valley

Personal details
- Born: Julián David López Tenorio; 12 February 1984 (age 42) Palmira, Cauca Valley, Colombia
- Party: Union Party for the People (2022-present)
- Education: Pontificia Universidad Javeriana

Julián David López Tenorio (born 12 February 1984) is a Colombian business administrator and politician who served as President of the Chamber of Representatives from 2025 to 2026. He has served as advisor to the Ministry of the Interior, general director of the National Aquaculture and Fisheries Authority, secretary general of Coldeportes, and deputy director of the National Federation of Departments.

A member of the Union Party for the People party, López studied business administration at the Pontificia Universidad Javeriana. He holds a specialization in government, management, and public affairs and a master's degree in government and public policy from the Universidad Externado de Colombia.

== Notes ==
=== References ===
- "H.R. Julián David López Tenorio". Chamber of Representatives (in Spanish). 20 July 2025.
- Sánchez Cristo, Julio (22 July 2025). "Julián López, nuevo presidente de la Cámara: "No soy un títere del Gobierno"" [Julián López, new Speaker of the House: "I am not a puppet of the government."]. Cambio (in Spanish).
- "Julián López, de la U, es el virtual nuevo presidente de la Cámara" [Julián López, from the U, is the virtual new president of the Chamber]. La Silla Vacía (in Spanish). 16 July 2025.
- "Él es Julián López, nuevo presidente de la Cámara que recibió apoyo del Pacto Histórico" [He is Julián López, the new president of the Chamber who received support from the Historic Pact.]. El Colombiano (in Spanish). 21 July 2025.
- González Duarte, María Alejandra (18 July 2025). "¿Quién es Julián David López, el nuevo presidente de la Cámara de Representantes cercano al gobierno de Gustavo Petro?" [Who is Julián David López, the new Speaker of the House of Representatives, close to Gustavo Petro's government?]. El Tiempo (in Spanish).
- Salazar, Carol (20 July 2025). "Julián López es el nuevo presidente de la Cámara de Representantes: este es su perfil" [Julián López is the new Speaker of the House of Representatives: this is his profile]. Infobae (in Spanish).
- "¿Quién es Julián López, el nuevo presidente de la Cámara de Representantes?" [Who is Julián López, the new President of the Chamber of Representatives?]. RTVC Noticias (in Spanish). 21 July 2025.
- Pineda, María Paula (20 July 2025). "Julián López fue elegido como el nuevo presidente de la Cámara de Representantes: perfil y más" [Julián López was elected as the new speaker of the House of Representatives: profile and more]. Caracol Radio (in Spanish).

Political offices
Preceded by Jaime Salamanca	President of the Chamber of Representatives; 2025-2026	Succeeded by Nicolás Barguil
