= Carol Borda =

Colombian politician (born 1995)

Member of the Chamber of Representatives
- Incumbent
- Assumed office 20 July 2026
- Constituency: Bogotá

Personal details
- Born: 8 March 1995 (age 31)
- Party: National Salvation Movement

Carol Stefanny Borda Acevedo (born 8 March 1995) is a Colombian politician serving as a member of the Chamber of Representatives since 2026. She previously worked at the Directorate of Human Rights of the Ministry of the Interior and as an advisor to the Bogotá City Council.
