= Julio Manzur (politician) =

Colombian politician (born 1947)

Senator of Colombia
- In office July 20, 1994 – May 15, 2009
- In office July 1, 1982 – July 19, 1990

Member of the Chamber of Representatives
- In office July 1, 1991 – July 19, 1994
- Constituency: Córdoba

Member of the Departmental Assembly of Córdoba
- In office January 1, 1980 – July 1, 1982

Personal details
- Born: Julio Alberto Manzur Abdala; October 29, 1947 (age 78) Cereté, Córdoba, Colombia
- Party: Conservative
- Spouse: Carmen Imbett
- Children: 2
- Education: National University of Colombia
- Website: Chamber website

Julio Alberto Manzur Abdala (born October 29, 1947) is a Colombian agronomist, politician and member of the Conservative party.

Manzur has served as a congressman, serving as a Senator of Colombia on two occasions. the first time from July 1, 1982, to July 19, 1990, he would later serve as a Member of the Chamber of Representatives between July 1, 1991, to July 19, 1994, later he would serve as Senator again from July 20, 1994, to May 15, 2009.
