= Soledad Tamayo Tamayo =

Colombian politician

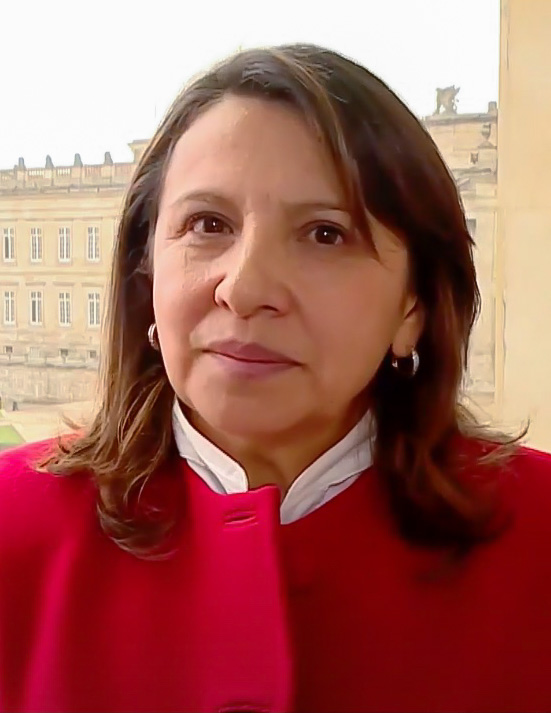

Senator of the Republic of Colombia
- Incumbent
- Assumed office July 20, 2022
- In office April 14, 2021 – July 2022

Personal details
- Born: March 20, 1958 (age 68) Palermo, Colombia
- Education: Saint Thomas Aquinas University
- Occupation: Politician, lawyer

Soledad Tamayo Tamayo (March 20, 1958, Palermo, Paipa, Colombia) is a Colombian lawyer and politician.

== Biography ==
Born in Palermo, Paipa, Boyacá, she is the sister of politicians Fernando Tamayo Tamayo and Helio Rafael Tamayo Tamayo. She joined the Conservative Party at a very young age. She studied law at the Universidad Santo Tomás and specialized in social policy at the Pontificia Universidad Javeriana.

Her career as a politician began as a police inspector in Bogotá between 1983 and 1985. Between 1986 and 1994 she was advisor of the district cadastre in the mayor's office of Andrés Pastrana. In 1995 she was councilor of Bogotá until 2011 where she was president of the Council in 2009–2010. In 2018 she aspired to be senator of the republic in 2018, in which she was not elected. She was substitute senator in two periods: 2018 and 2021–2022 for the deaths of Fernando Tamayo Tamayo Tamayo and Eduardo Enríquez Maya. In 2022 she was elected by popular vote.
