= Sandra Ramírez =

Combatant of FARC

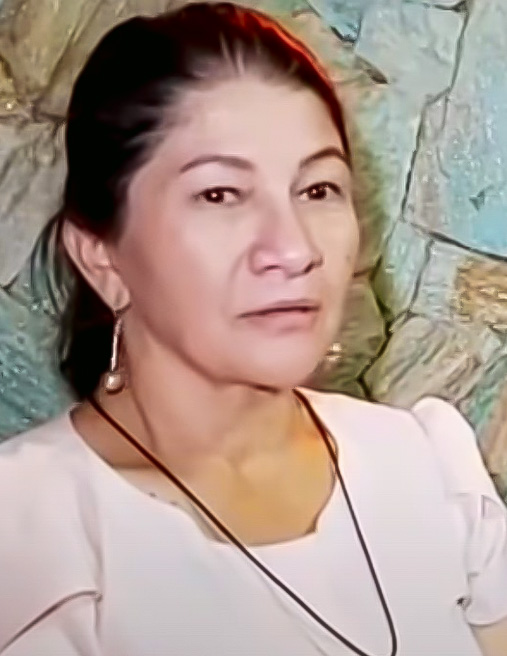

Member of the Senate of Colombia
- Incumbent
- Assumed office 20 July 2018

Personal details
- Born: Griselda Lobo Silva; 1964 or 1965 (age 60–61) La Paz, Colombia
- Party: Commons
- Domestic partner: Manuel Marulanda (d. 2008)
- Occupation: Militant, politician

Sandra Ramírez Lobo Silva (née Griselda Lobo Silva; born 1964/1965) was a combatant in the Revolutionary Armed Forces of Colombia (FARC) from 1981 until the signing of the peace treaty in 2016. In 2018, she was granted a chair to the Senate of Colombia for the Commons party.

== Early life ==
Griselda Lobo Silva was born in La Paz, Santander in 1964 or 1965. She grew up in Santa Helena del Opón, and began Baccalaureate studies in Bucaramanga, but when her mother became ill, she had to drop out of school to help raise her 17 brothers and sisters. It was during this period when she observed FARC members passing through their farm, taking inspiration from one of their commanders who was a woman giving orders to men.

== FARC militancy ==
She joined the FARC in 1981 as a combat nurse and took the nom de guerre of Sandra. Two years later she was transferred to Cundinamarca Department and promoted to guard of the secretariat of the central general staff, which was in peace talks with the government of Belisario Betancur. During this time, her image became public. She later became the radio operator for Manuel Marulanda, a member of the FARC national secretariat, whom she met in November 1983. The two began a romantic partnership, and she helped raise five children he had from a previous relationship.

She was appointed delegate of the FARC in dialogues with the Colombian government in Havana in 2012. At this time she adopted the surname Ramírez, which she chose arbitrarily. The talks led to the signing of a peace treaty where the insurgent group would become a political party, the Common Alternative Revolutionary Force (Commons). It was granted five seats in each chamber of the Colombian Congress as of 20 July 2018. One of these Senate seats was occupied by Ramírez for the term 2018–2022.

== Commons party ==
With the creation of the new Commons party, Ramírez was elected as a member of its national directorate, acting as its spokesperson several times, alongside its president, Rodrigo Londoño. She was elected second vice president of the Senate in 2020.

In 2021, she legally changed her name to Sandra Ramírez Lobo Silva.
