= David Racero =

Colombian politician (born 1986)

The Honourable David Racero
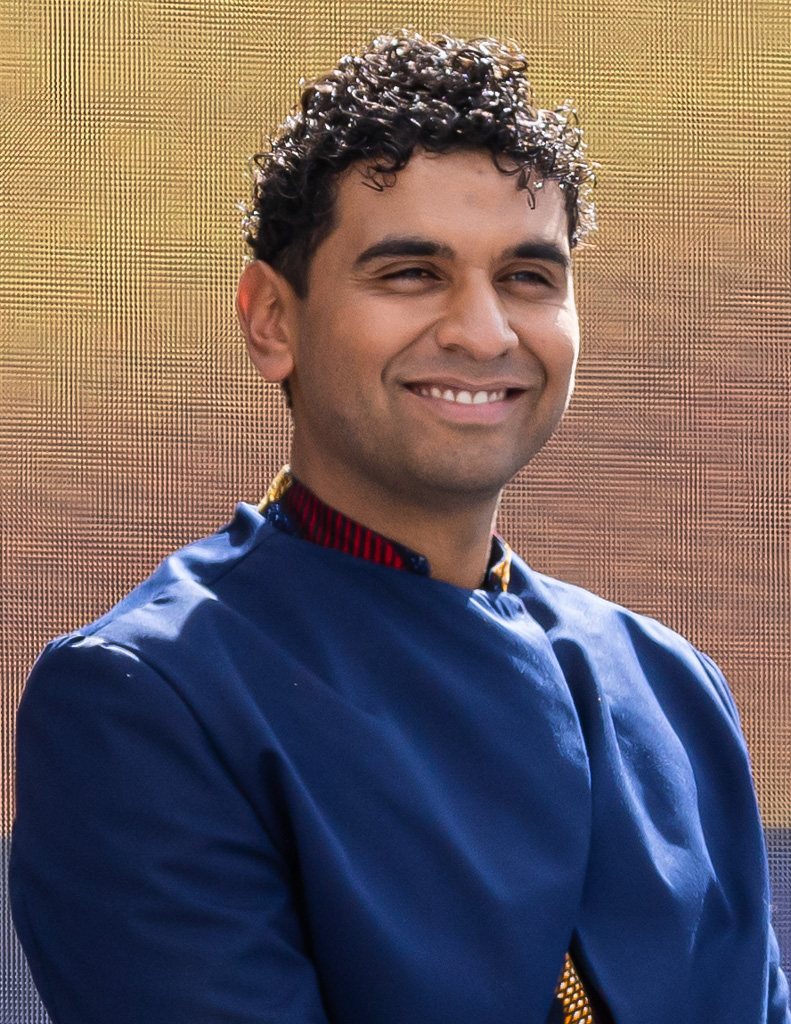
- Racero in 7 August 2022

President of the Chamber of Representatives
- In office 20 July 2022 – 20 July 2023
- Preceded by: Jennifer Arias
- Succeeded by: Andrés Calle

Member of the Chamber of Representatives
- Incumbent
- Assumed office 20 July 2018
- Constituency: Capital District

Personal details
- Born: David Ricardo Racero Mayorca; 11 October 1986 (age 39) Bogotá, D.C., Colombia
- Party: Humane Colombia
- Education: National University
- Website: Chamber website

David Ricardo Racero Mayorca (born 11 October 1986) is a Colombian politician, he holds a B.A. in philosophy. He has been elected as the representative for Bogotá in the Chamber of Representatives of Colombia for the periods 2018–2022 and 2022–2026. Since 20 July 2022, he has been the president of the Chamber.

He has a master's degree in Economic Sciences from the National University of Colombia and finished a PhD in Political Studies and International Relations at the same university.

== Controversies ==
Between 2024 and 2025, journalist Daniel Coronell published investigations suggesting that Racero was involved in clientelist practices and the possible crime of influence peddling, allegedly benefiting himself and his uncle José Luis Mayorca. The Supreme Court of Justice subsequently opened an investigation against him.

On 23 May 2025, the Office of the Attorney General of the Nation ordered a preliminary inquiry against David Racero Mayorca and Jorge Eduardo Londoño Ulloa, the director of the SENA, for alleged irregularities in public contracting. The inquiry focused on claims of a potentially rigged process that may have benefited a relative of Representative Racero, allegedly harming the rights of other public servants.

Political offices
| Preceded by Jennifer Arias | President of the Chamber of Representatives; 2022–2023 | Succeeded by Andrés Calle |
