= Alejandro Bermeo =

Colombian politician

Member of the Senate
- Incumbent
- Assumed office 20 July 2022

Personal details
- Party: National Salvation Movement

TikTok information
- Page: Alejandro Bermeo
- Years active: 2024–present
- Followers: 244.9 thousand

YouTube information
- Channel: Alejandro Bermeo
- Years active: 2019–present
- Genre: Politics
- Subscribers: 298 thousand
- Views: 40.7 million
- Last updated: 5 August 2026

John Alejandro Bermeo Rodriguez is a Colombian politician and internet personality serving as a member of the Senate since 2026. As of 2026, he has 250 thousand followers on YouTube.
