= Quiroga, Bogotá =

Quiroga
- Barrio
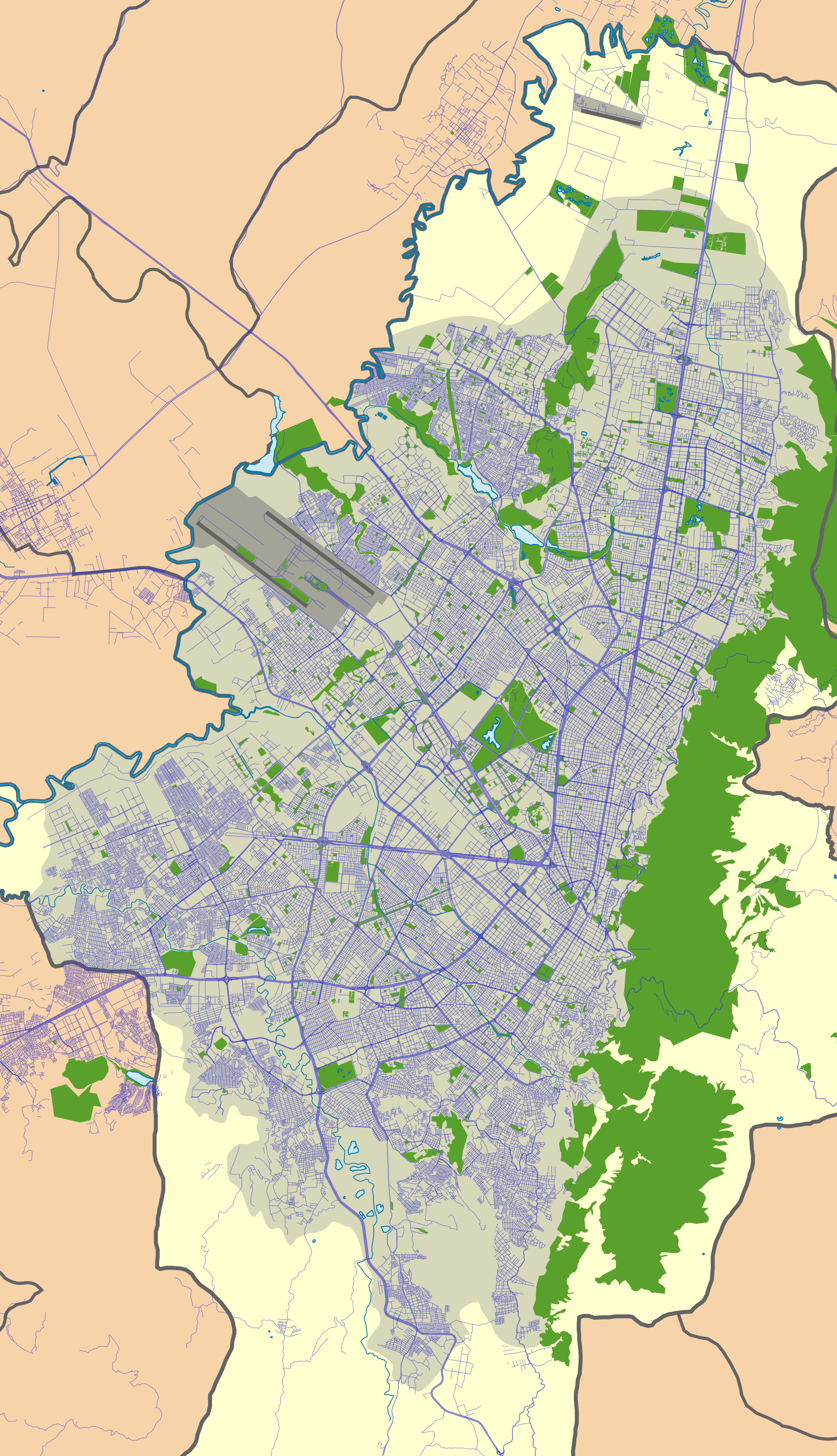
- Location within Bogotá
- Coordinates: 4.5812°N 74.1101°W
- Country: Colombia
- Department: Distrito Capital
- City: Bogotá

Quiroga is a neighbourhood (barrio) of Bogotá, Colombia, located in the Rafael Uribe Uribe locality.
