= Aurelio Iragorri Hormaza =

Colombian politician (1937–2020)

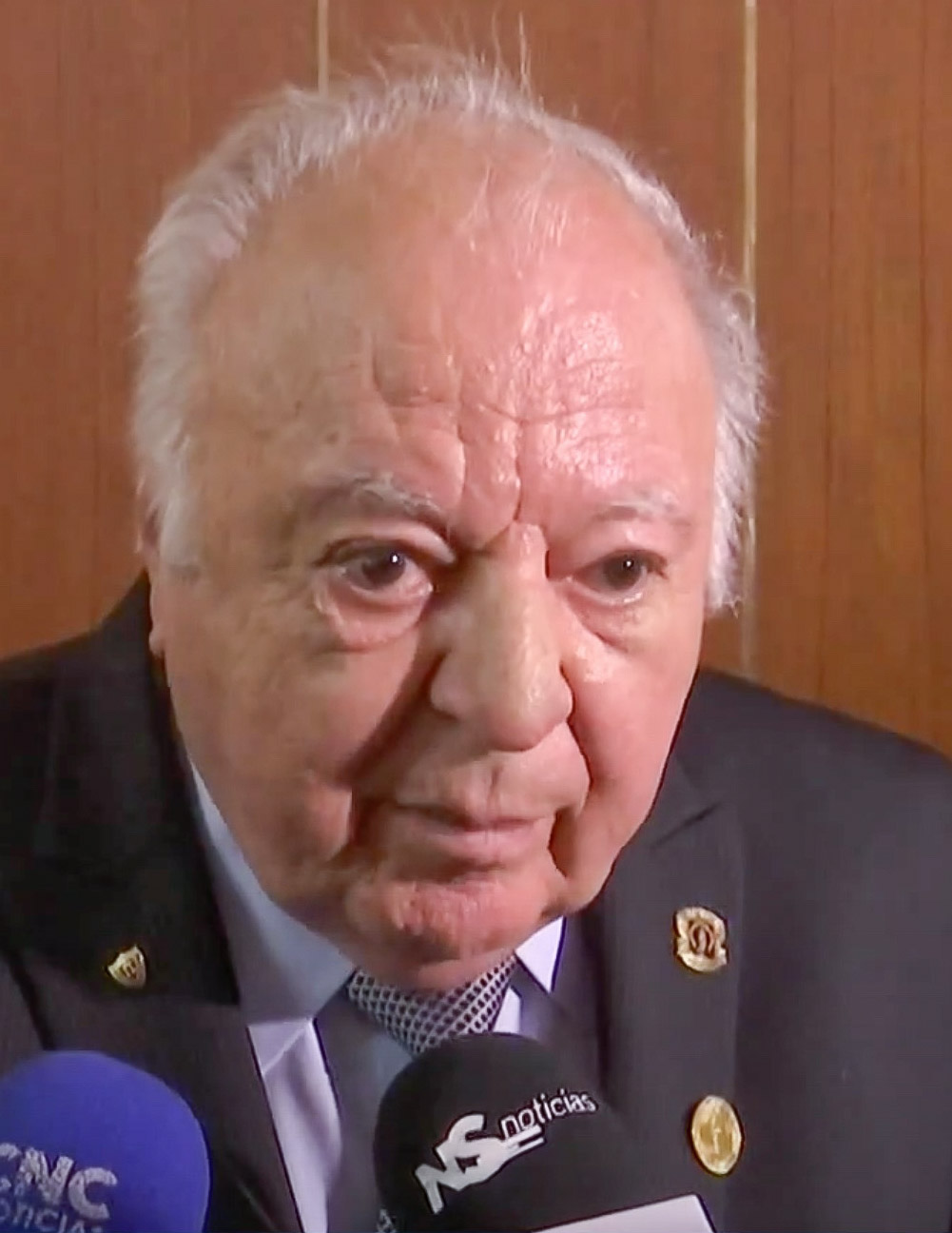

President of the Union Party for the People
- In office December 12, 2012 – November 15, 2013
- Preceded by: Roy Barreras
- Succeeded by: Sergio Díaz-Granados Guida

President of the Senate
- In office July 20, 1990 – February 5, 1991
- Preceded by: Luis Guillermo Giraldo
- Succeeded by: José Blackburn

Senator of Colombia
- In office December 12, 1991 – July 20, 2014

President of the Chamber of Representatives
- In office July 20, 1981 – July 20, 1982
- Preceded by: Hernando Turbay Turbay
- Succeeded by: Hernando Gómez Otálora

Member of the Chamber of Representatives
- In office July 20, 1978 – July 20, 1982
- Constituency: Cauca

Personal details
- Born: Aurelio Iragorri Hormaza; April 28, 1937; Popayán, Cauca, Colombia
- Died: September 7, 2020 (aged 83); Bogotá, D.C., Colombia
- Education: University of Cauca

Aurelio Iragorri Hormaza (28 April 1937 – 7 September 2020) was a Colombian politician who served as the President of the Chamber of Representatives and a Senator.

Iragorri died from complications of COVID-19 on 7 September 2020, at the age of 83 during the COVID-19 pandemic in Colombia.
