= Alfredo Cuello Baute =

Colombian politician

The Honorable Alfredo Cuello Baute

Member of the Chamber of Representatives for Cesar
- Incumbent
- Assumed office July 20, 2014

Member of the Chamber of Representatives
- In office July 20, 2002 – July 20, 2010

Personal details
- Born: July 23, 1973 (age 52) Valledupar, Cesar
- Party: Colombian Conservative Party
- Education: Sergio Arboleda University

Alfredo Cuello Baute better known as "Ape Cuello" is a Colombian politician and business administrator. He has served as a member in the House Representative of Colombia. He represented the Cesar Department with the endorsement of the Colombian Conservative Party since 2002. During the 2014 legislative elections he was elected with 32,119 votes and in the 2018 legislative elections he obtained 55,615 this being the largest vote for the House of Representatives in the history of the Department of Cesar.

== Biography ==
Alfredo Cuello Baute is the son of conservative politician Alfredo Cuello Dávila and Marta Dolores Baute Uhía. He is the grandson of the conservative patriarch Manuel Germán Cuello. Cuello Baute is married to Lina María Baute Hinojosa. Cuello Baute attended his elementary and high school at Valledupar Bilingual College. He is a graduate of Business Administration from Sergio Arboleda University. He also has a Master's in Business Administration from Xavier University.

== Career ==
=== Chamber of Representatives of Colombia ===
Cuello inherited a political wealth that lasted for three generations. His grandfather Manuel Germán Cuello, was governor of the Department of Cesar. His father Alfredo Cuello Dávila was a congressman on several occasions for the conservative party, in alliances with the Gnecco Cerchar Clan, linked to the Liberal Party. In the 2002 legislative elections, with the singer Jorge Oñate as the second runner, he was elected Representative to Cesar in the chamber with 26,894 votes, in 2006 he was reelected with 28,704 votes.

=== Links with paramilitarism ===
Cuello Baute was investigated by the Supreme Court of Justice for possible links with paramilitaries of the United Self-Defense Forces of Colombia (AUC), in particular with the commander Rodrigo Tovar Pupo, but the investigation was abruptly ended. Cuello Baute acknowledged knowing Rodigo Tovar Pupo in the cause of the investigation. On September 26, 2007 representatives Cuello Baute and Alvaro Cuello Morón were formally indicted on Criminal charges in the Supreme Court of Justice on grounds of interference by the paramilitary United Self-Defense Forces of Colombia during the campaigns. Following a full investigation, on February 10, 2010 the Supreme Court ruled out the investigation against him for paramilitarism.
