= Quiroga (TransMilenio) =

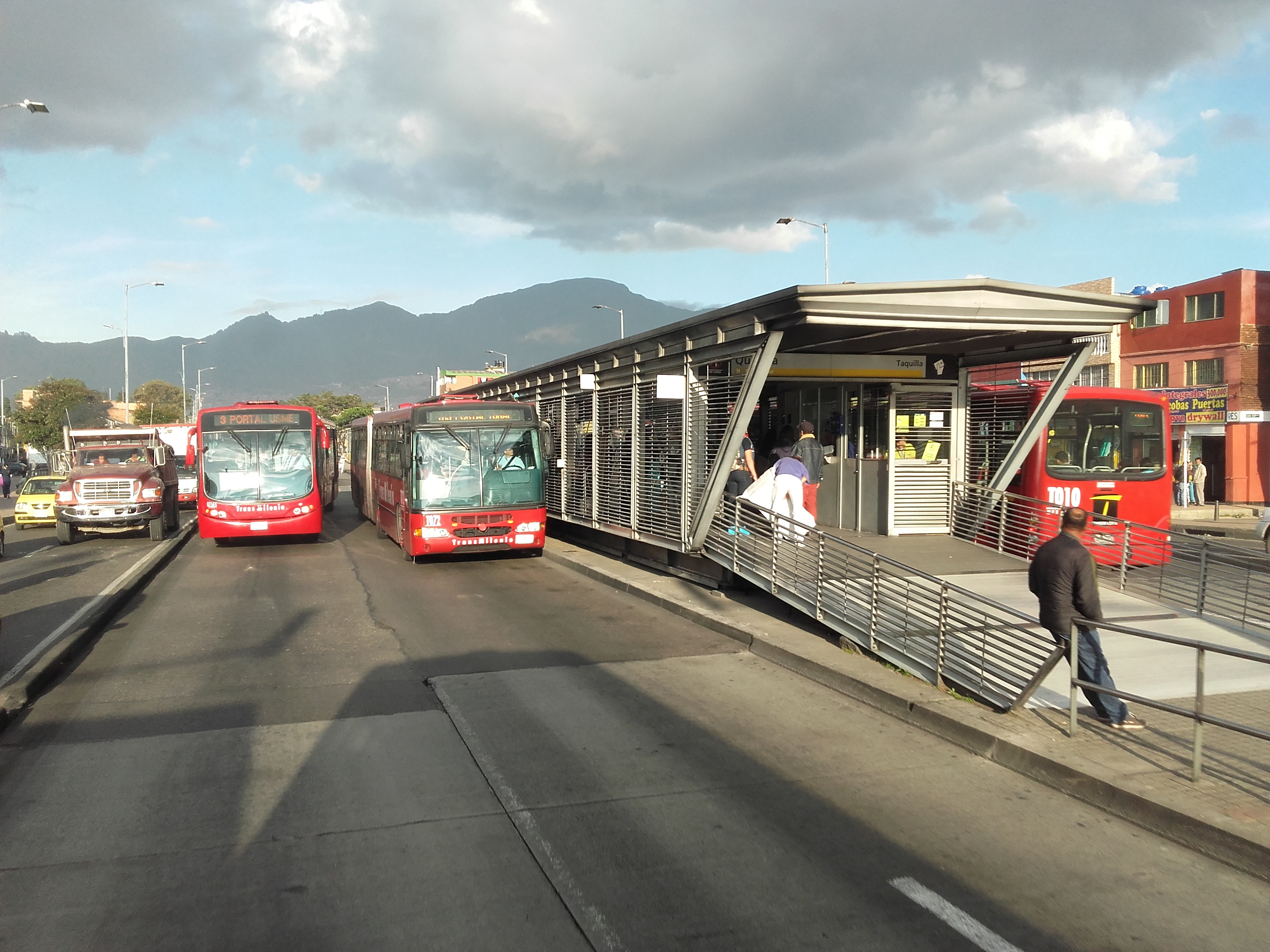

General information
- Location: Avenida Caracas with Calles 32 sur and 33 sur Rafael Uribe Uribe
- Line: Caracas Sur
- Platforms: 2

History
- Opened: June 9, 2001

Services
Preceding station	TransMilenio	Following station
Olaya towards Tercer Milenio	H	Calle 40 Sur towards Portal de Usme or Portal del Tunal
Location

The simple station Quiroga is part of the TransMilenio mass-transit system of Bogotá, Colombia, opened in 2000.

== Location ==
The station is located in southern Bogotá, specifically on Avenida Caracas with Calles 32 and 33 sur.

== History ==
At the beginning of 2001, the second phase of the Caracas line of the system was opened from Tercer Milenio to the intermediate station Calle 40 Sur. A few months later, service was extended south to Portal de Usme.

The station is named Quiroga due to its proximity to the neighborhood of Quiroga .

In 2004, two passengers died and two others injured by an explosion of four kilograms of ammonal.

== Station Services ==
=== Old trunk services ===
Services rendered until April 29, 2006
Kind	Routes	Frequency
Current	2 Portal Norte 3 Portal Norte	Every 3 minutes on average

=== Main line service ===
Service as of April 29, 2006
Type	Northern Routes	Southern Routes
Local	3	3
Express Monday through Saturday; All day	B13 / C17	H13 / H17

=== Feeder routes ===
This station does not have connections to feeder routes.

=== Inter-city service ===
This station does not have inter-city service.

== See also ==
- Bogotá
- TransMilenio
- List of TransMilenio Stations
