= María Fernanda Carrascal =

Colombian politician (born 1990)

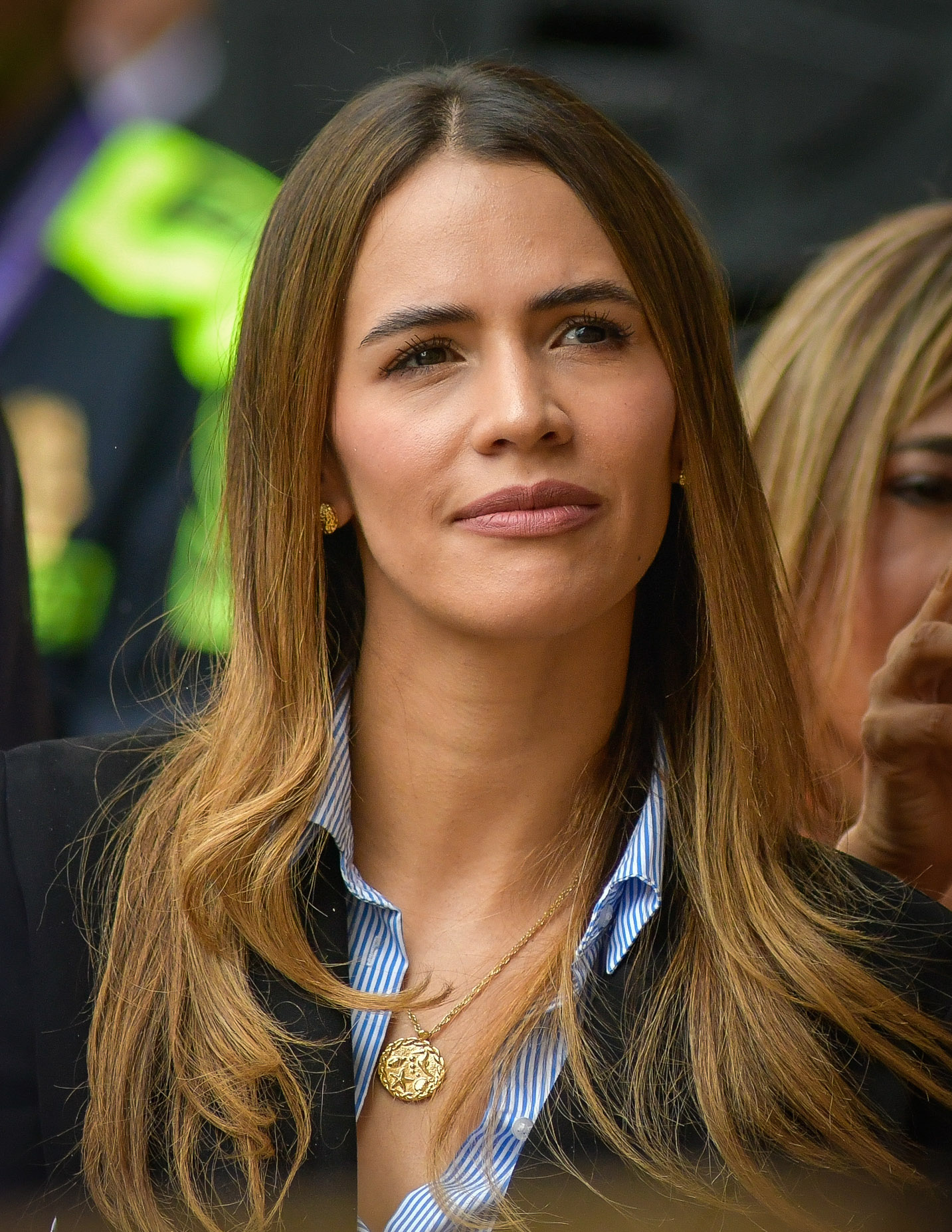
- Carrascal in 2025

Member of the Chamber of Representatives
- Incumbent
- Assumed office 20 July 2022
- Constituency: Bogotá

Personal details
- Born: 10 January 1990 (age 36)
- Party: Historic Pact

María Fernanda Carrascal Rojas (born 10 January 1990) is a Colombian politician serving as a member of the Chamber of Representatives since 2022. She has served as co-group leader of the Historic Pact since 2026.
