= Miguel Ángel Pinto =

Colombian politician (born 1961)

The Honourable Miguel Ángel Pinto
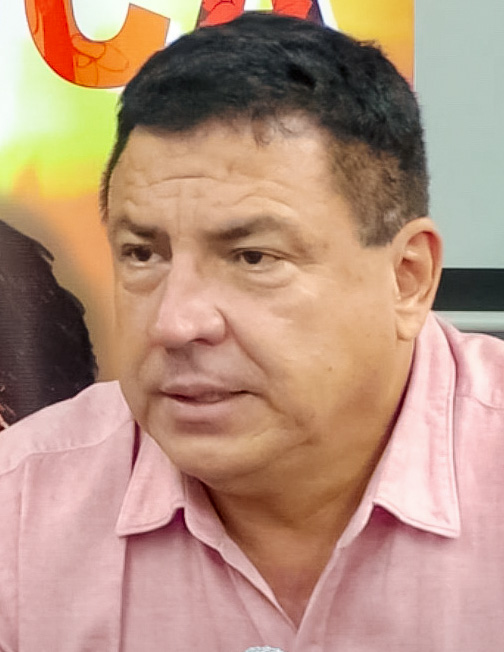

President of the Senate
- Acting
- In office 4 May 2023 – 6 July 2023
- Preceded by: Roy Barreras
- Succeeded by: Alexander López Maya

Vice President of the Senate
- In office 20 July 2022 – 20 July 2023 Serving with Honorio Henríquez
- President: Roy Barreras
- Preceded by: Maritza Martínez
- Succeeded by: María José Pizarro

Senator of Colombia
- In office 20 July 2018 – 20 July 2026

President of the Chamber of Representatives
- In office 20 July 2016 – 20 July 2017
- Preceded by: Alfredo Deluque
- Succeeded by: Rodrigo Lara Restrepo

Member of the Chamber of Representatives
- In office 27 October 2011 – 20 July 2018
- Constituency: Santander

Personal details
- Born: Miguel Ángel Pinto Hernández; November 14, 1961 (age 64) Bucaramanga, Colombia
- Party: Liberal (2000-present)
- Education: Autonomous University of Bucaramanga
- Profession: Medical doctor Politician

Miguel Ángel Pinto Hernández (born November 14, 1961) is a Colombian politician, lawyer and specialist in administrative law, member of the Liberal party.

Pinto has served as a Colombian Congressman, having served as a member of the Chamber of Representatives between 2011 and 2018, representing the department of Santander, in 2016 he was elected as president of the Chamber of Representatives, a position he served until July 20, 2017, in 2018 he became elected Senator, during the 2018 Parliamentary election, later he would be re-elected again, during the 2022 Parliamentary election on July 20, 2022, he would be elected as vice president of the Senate, a position that he shared with Senator Honorio Henríquez, Later on May 4, 2023, he would act as acting president of the Senate, after the removal of his predecessor Roy Barreras when he was found in double militancy, a position in which he would serve until June 6, when Alexander López Maya was elected as his successor.

== Chamber of Representatives ==
Pinto arrived at the Chamber of Representatives in October 2011, replacing Jesús Arenas, who lost the investiture of Congressman, after being found in double militancy, by the Supreme Court of Justice. Pinto, who had not obtained enough votes in the 2010 Parliamentary election, was later re-elected in 2014, as an electoral partner of Senator Horacio Serpa, thanks to his popularity in Congress, he was later elected as president of the First constitutional commission of the Chamber of Representatives, and then president of the Chamber of Representatives.

In 2018 after his election as senator with a vote of 90 thousand votes, which allowed him to be elected president of the Senate Ethics Commission and then President of the First Commission. He was re-elected during the 2022 Parliamentary election on July 20, 2022, he would be elected vice president of the Senate, a position he shared with Senator Honorio Henríquez, later on May 4, 2023, he would act as acting president of the Senate, after the dismissal. of his predecessor Roy Barreras found in double militancy, a position in which he would serve until June 6, when Alexander López Maya was chosen as his successor.

Chamber of Representatives of Colombia
| Preceded by Alfredo Deluque | President of the Chamber of Representatives; 2016-2017 | Succeeded by Rodrigo Lara Restrepo |
Senate of Colombia
| Preceded by Maritza Martínez | Vice President of the Senate; 2022-2023; Served alongside: Honorio Henríquez | Succeeded by María José Pizarro |
