= University of Medellín Theater =

Coordinates: 6.233104°N 75.610407°W

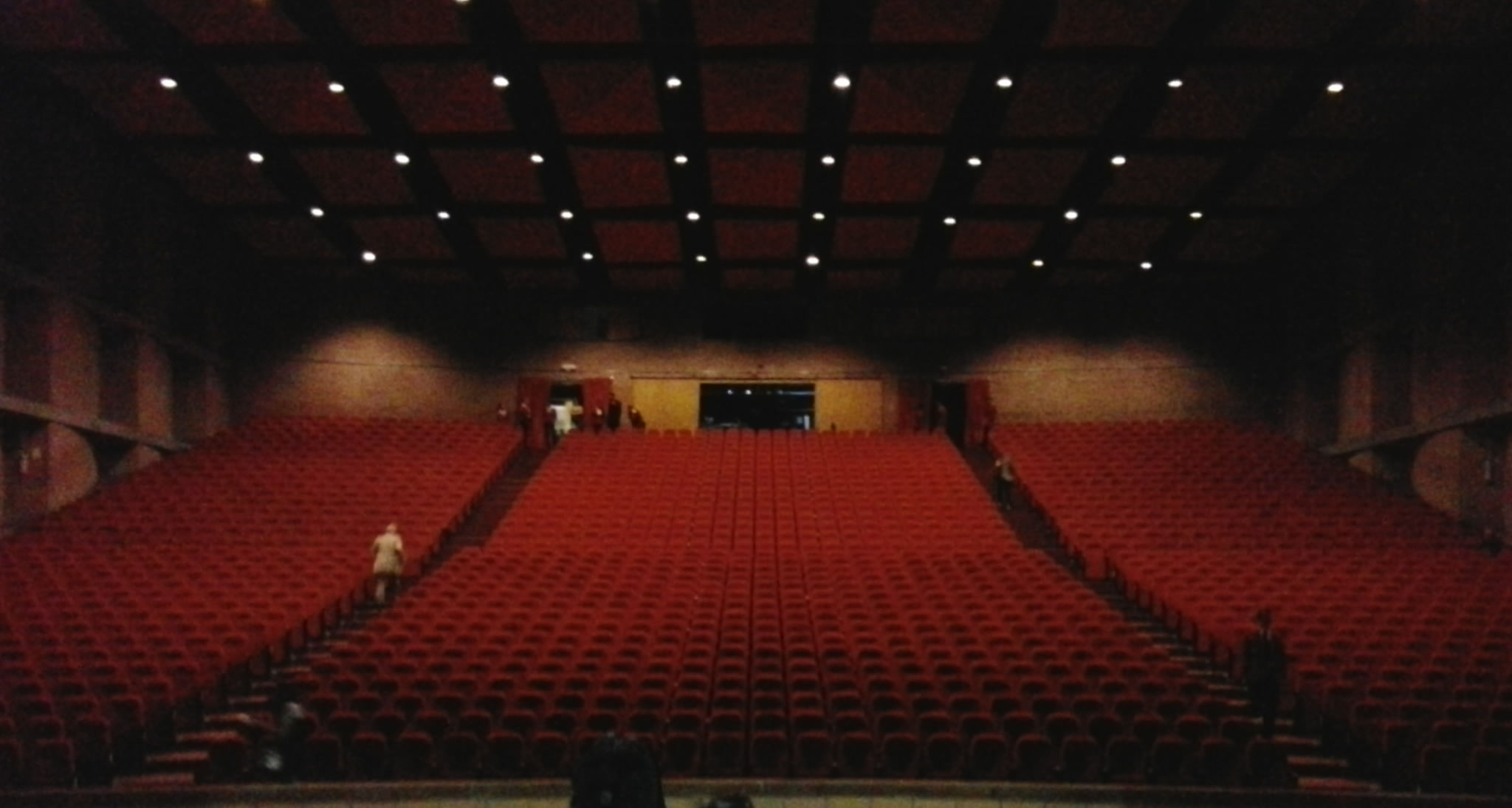
- Interactive map of University of Medellín Theater
- Address: Carrera 87 N° 30 - 65, Build 17th Universidad de Medellín; Medellín; Colombia
- Owner: Universidad de Medellín
- Capacity: 1,702

Construction
- Opened: September 26, 1985

The University of Medellín Theater is a 1,702-seat theater, the largest in Medellín, Colombia. It has hosted national and international plays and shows. Entertainers such as Cats, Chespirito, Mayumaná, Emma Shapplin, Los Vivancos, Raphael, José Luis Perales, Paloma San Basilio, and Bajofondo have performed there.

== History ==
The Theatre opened on 26 September 1985. In tribute to the originator of the project, the theater was baptized "Gabriel Botero Obregón" in 1988. Initially, the theater was for exclusive use by the University, but as it became larger, the school made it available for public performances.

== External links (Spanish) ==
- Página oficial Universidad de Medellín
- Página del Teatro
