= Jahel Quiroga =

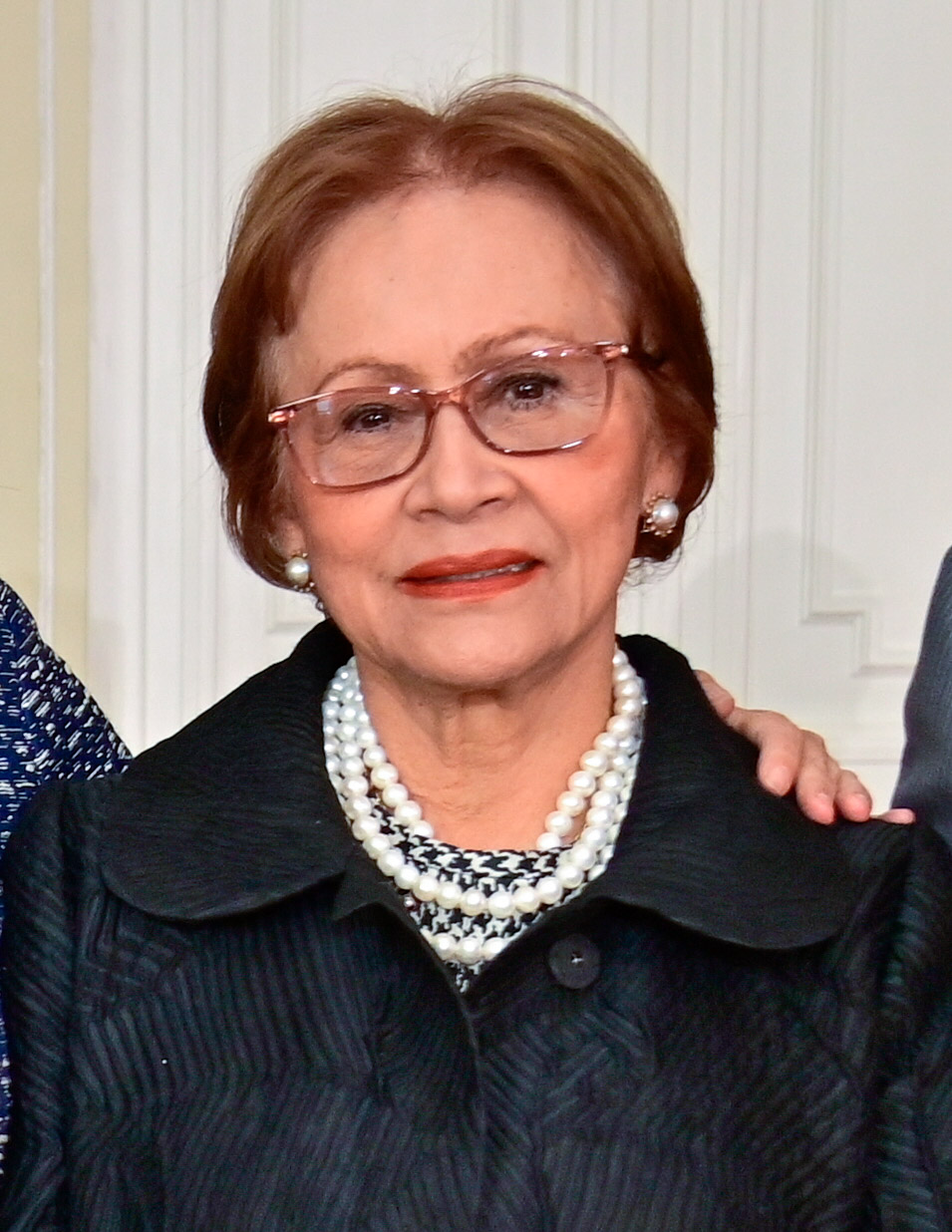

Member of the Senate of Colombia
- Incumbent
- Assumed office 20 July 2022

Personal details
- Born: Jahel Quiroga Carrillo; Chaparral, Colombia
- Political party: Patriotic Union
- Education: Francisco José de Caldas District University
- Occupation: Industrial engineer, politician

Jahel Quiroga Carrillo is a Colombian industrial engineer, human rights activist, and politician of the Patriotic Union party (UP). She is a survivor of an extermination effort against members of the organization in the 1980s.

She has been a member of the Senate of Colombia since July 2022.

== Biography ==
Jahel Quiroga was born in Chaparral, Tolima. She studied industrial engineering at Francisco José de Caldas District University in Bogotá.

She was elected councilor of Barrancabermeja in 1988. Jorge Orlando Higuita Rojas, her benchmate on the council, was assassinated in 1989.

In 1992, she was again elected to the Barrancabermeja council, but could not finish her term due to threats against her life. She went into exile in the United States for a year.

In 1993, Quiroga founded the non-governmental organization Reiniciar together with Aída Avella and other surviving members of the UP, with the purpose of assisting victims of human rights violations and documenting the extermination of her political group. After receiving threats, she went into exile in Europe. That December, she took the UP's case to the Inter-American Commission on Human Rights because judicial investigations were not advancing in Colombia.

She has been part of the international board of directors of the World Organisation Against Torture, and is a member of its general assembly.

In 2012, Quiroga received the Order of the Colombian Congress in the degree of Knight for her contribution to the defense of the human rights of the victims of attacks against the Patriotic Union.

In the 2022 parliamentary election, she was chosen senator by the closed list of the political coalition known as the Historic Pact.
