= Marcos Daniel Pineda =

Colombian politician (born 1977)

The Honourable Marcos Daniel Pineda

Senator of Colombia
- Incumbent
- Assumed office July 20, 2022

Mayor of Montería
- In office January 1, 2016 – December 31, 2019
- Preceded by: Carlos Eduardo Correa
- Succeeded by: Carlos Ordosgoitia
- In office January 1, 2008 – December 31, 2011
- Preceded by: León Fidel Ojeda
- Succeeded by: Carlos Eduardo Correa

Personal details
- Born: Marcos Daniel Pineda García; May 5, 1977 (age 49) Montería, Córdoba, Colombia
- Party: Conservative (2008-present)
- Education: Sergio Arboleda University; George Washington University
- Website: Senate website

Marcos Daniel Pineda García (born June 5, 1977) is a Colombian business administrator, politician and Senator of Colombia who previously served as Mayor of Montería twice from 2008 to 2011 and again from 2016 to 2019. A member of the Conservative Party, Pineda received the third-highest vote in 2022.

Born in Montería, Córdoba, Pineda graduated from Sergio Arboleda University in Bogotá, D.C. He began his political career as Mayor of Montería, elected in 2007 and re-elected in 2015.

Political offices
Preceded by León Fidel Ojeda	Mayor of Montería; 2008–2011	Succeeded by Carlos Eduardo Correa
Preceded by Carlos Eduardo Correa	Mayor of Montería; 2016-2019	Succeeded by Carlos Ordosgoitia
