= Alejandro Carlos Chacón =

Colombian politician (born 1972)

Member of the Senate
- Incumbent
- Assumed office 20 July 2022

Personal details
- Born: 2 October 1972 (age 53)
- Party: Liberal Party

Alejandro Carlos Chacón Camargo (born 2 October 1972) is a Colombian politician serving as a member of the Senate since 2022. He was a member of the Chamber of Representatives from 2010 to 2022, and served as president of the chamber from 2018 to 2019.
