= Fabio Amín =

Colombian politician (born 1976)

The Honourable Fabio Amín

Senator of Colombia
- Incumbent
- Assumed office July 20, 2018

Vice Chairman of the 1st Commission of the Senate
- In office July 20, 2019 – July 20, 2020
- Preceded by: Temístocles Ortega
- Succeeded by: Paloma Valencia

President of the Chamber of Representatives
- In office July 20, 2014 – July 20, 2015
- Preceded by: Hernán Penagos
- Succeeded by: Alfredo Deluque

Member of the Chamber of Representatives
- In office July 20, 2006 – July 20, 2018
- Constituency: Córdoba

Member of the Departmental Assembly of Córdoba
- In office January 1, 2004 – May 6, 2005
- Constituency: Liberal

Personal details
- Born: Fabio Raúl Amín Saleme; October 15, 1976 (age 49) Lorica, Córdoba, Colombia
- Party: Liberal (2004-present)
- Education: Pontificia Universidad Javeriana (BBE)
- Website: Chamber website

Fabio Raúl Amín Saleme (born October 15, 1976) is a Colombian economist, politician, and senator. A member of the Liberal Party, he has held his seat since 2018.

Born in Lorica, Córdoba, Amín graduated from the Pontificia Universidad Javeriana in Bogotá, D.C. He began his career as a Member of the Departmental Assembly of Córdoba in 2004. Amín was elected to the Chamber of Representatives in 2006 where he held his seat for twelve years. In 2014, he was elected President of the Chamber of Representatives, a position he held until 2015. He was subsequently elected as a Senator in 2018.

Senate of Colombia
Preceded by Temístocles Ortega	Vice Chairman of the 1st Commission of the Senate; 2019-2020	Succeeded by Paloma Valencia
Political offices
Preceded by Hernán Penagos	President of the Chamber of Representatives; 2014–2015	Succeeded by Alfredo Deluque
