= Nicolás Barguil =

Colombian politician (born 1984)

- Barguil in 2018

President of the Chamber of Representatives
- Incumbent
- Assumed office 20 July 2026
- Preceded by: Julián López

Personal details
- Born: 2 February 1984 (age 42)
- Party: Colombian Conservative Party

Nicolás Antonio Barguil Cubillos (born 2 February 1984) is a Colombian politician serving as a member of the Chamber of Representatives since 2022. He has served as president of the Chamber since 2026.
