= President of the Chamber of Representatives of Colombia =

Leader of the lower house of the Colombian congress

President of the Chamber of Representatives
- Seal of the Chamber of Representatives
- Incumbent; Nicolás Barguil since 20 July 2026
- Chamber of Representatives of Colombia
- Style: Mr. President (informal); The Honorable (formal)
- Status: Presiding officer
- Seat: National Capitol, Bogotá
- Nominator: Major parties (normally)
- Appointer: Chamber of Representatives
- Term length: One legislative year
- Constituting instrument: Constitution of Colombia
- Formation: 20 July 1882; 144 years ago
- First holder: Pedro Gual Escandon
- Deputy: First Vice President; Second Vice President

The president of the Chamber of Representatives of Colombia commonly known as the president of the Chamber is the highest authority of the Chamber of Representatives of Colombia. The office was established in 1811 by the First National Congress of Colombia.

It is third on the presidential line of succession after the vice president and the president of the senate.

The office is currently held by Nicolás Barguil of the Colombian Conservative Party. He was elected on 20 July 2026.

== See also ==
- Congress of Colombia
- President of the Senate of Colombia
