= Inauguration of Andrés Pastrana =

1998 Colombian presidential inauguration

Presidential inauguration of Andrés Pastrana
- Date: August 7, 1998; 27 years ago
- Time: 2:00 pm (COST)
- Location: National Capitol Bogotá, D.C.
- Participants: Andrés Pastrana; 30th president of Colombia — Assuming office Gustavo Bell; 7th vice president of Colombia — Assuming office Fabio Valencia; President of the Senate — Administering oath Ernesto Samper; 29th president of Colombia — Leaving office

Andrés Pastrana's inauguration as the 30th President of Colombia took place on Friday, August 7, 1998, marking the start of Andrés Pastrana's four-year term as president and Gustavo Bell as vice president. The 26th presidential inauguration took place as usual in the central front of the National Capitol in Bogotá, D.C. Pastrana was sworn in as presidential oath, after which Bell was sworn in as vice president.

== Schedule ==
Andrés Pastrana attended a lunch held at the San Carlos Palace hours before the Ceremony. At 2:00 p.m. he left accompanied by his wife Nohra and his children Santiago, Laura and Valentina. During his walk towards the Plaza de Bolívar. The elect-president and his family watched a small performance by the misis choir. Later, the Pastrana family entered the Church of San Ignacio, where their father, the 23rd President Misael Pastrana, was buried in 1997. The elect-president and his family held a small prayer in front of Misael Pastrana's tomb and later continued with their walk. The band of the Military Cadet School José María Córdoba performed military honors and later sang the National Anthem of Colombia in front of the Palace of Justice, officially starting the inauguration ceremony.

Upon Pastrana's arrival, he received the oath and the presidential sash from the president of the Senate, Fabio Valencia Cossio. Fifteen salutes were fired by the Colombian Military Forces from the Boyacá Bridge to greet the new president. And then Pastrana administered the oath to Gustavo Bell, as vice president of Colombia. After the vice-presidential oath, Pastrana continued with his inaugural speech which lasted 30 minutes and 20 seconds. The president and his family were escorted by the generals of the Colombian Military Forces, the Chief of the Joint Chiefs of Staff, the National Army, the National Navy, the Air Force and the National Police. Who were followed by 12 Navy pipers. Upon arrival, the Presidential Guard received the president and his family with military honors. And then the president and his family prepared to greet former president Ernesto Samper, his wife Jacquin and their children, Miguel, Felipe and Andrés. Later, former President Samper and his family left the Casa de Nariño and continued their exit through Plaza Núñez.

== Assistants ==
=== Foreign leaders ===
- Carlos Ruckauf, Vice President of Argentina
- Jaime Fernández, Vice President of Dominican Republic
- Marco Maciel, Vice President of Brazil
- Miguel Ángel Rodríguez, President of Costa Rica
- Hugo Banzer Suárez, President of Bolivia
- Abelardo Colomé, Vice President of Cuba
- Abdalá Bucaram, President of Ecuador
  - Jamil Mahuad, Elect-President of Ecuador
- Sam Hinds, Prime Minister of Guyana
- Carlos Roberto Reina, President of Honduras
- Álvaro Arzú, President of Guatemala
- Ricardo Márquez Flores, Vice President of Peru
- Ernesto Pérez Balladares, President of Panama
  - (Spain) The Prince of Asturias (representing Juan Carlos I)
- Rafael Caldera, President of Venezuela

=== Local leaders ===
- Andrés González Díaz, Governor of Cundinamarca
- Antanas Mockus, Mayor of Bogotá

=== Former presidents ===
- Former President Julio César Turbay Ayala
- Former President Belisario Betancur and Rosa Helena Álvarez
- Former President Virgilio Barco and Carolina Isakson
- Former President César Gaviria and Ana Milena Muñoz de Gaviria
  - Former First lady María Cristina Arango

== See also ==
- 1998 Colombian presidential election
