= First inauguration of Álvaro Uribe =

2002 Colombian presidential inaugurtation

First presidential inauguration of Álvaro Uribe
- Date: 7 August 2002; 23 years ago
- Time: 3:00 pm (COST)
- Location: National Capitol Bogotá, D.C.
- Participants: Álvaro Uribe; 31st president of Colombia — Assuming office Francisco Santos; 8th vice president of Colombia — Assuming office Luis Alfredo Ramos; President of the Senate — Administering oath Andrés Pastrana; 30th president of Colombia — Leaving office

Álvaro Uribe's first inauguration as the 31st President of Colombia took place on Saturday, August 7, 2002, marking the beginning of the first four-year term of Álvaro Uribe as president and Francisco Santos as vice president. The 27th presidential inauguration did not take place in the central front of the National Capitol in Bogotá, D.C. As had been customary until 2002. Uribe was sworn in as presidential oath, after which Santos was sworn in as vice president.

After the victory and his arduous presidential campaign, Uribe became the first president of Colombia in 50 years of history not to belong to any of the traditional political streams that had been running the nation, they are the Liberal Party and the Conservative Party.

== Schedule ==
Álvaro Uribe left the San Carlos Palace at 3:30 accompanied by his wife Lina, his children Tomas and Jeronimo, Francisco Santos and his wife María Victoria. Escorted by the Generals of the Military Forces, the Joint General Staff, the Army, the Navy, the Air Force and the National Police. To the National Capitol. Uribe received the oath and the presidential sash from the president of the Senate, Dilian Francisca Toro, fifteen salutes were fired from the Bridge of Boyacá to greet the new president. Uribe administered the vice presidential oath to Francisco Santos and continued with his 30 minute and 40 second inaugural speech. For this occasion, the outgoing president and his wife did not welcome the new president and his family, a tradition that was thirty years old. The inauguration of Cabinet members took place the following day instead of on the same day of the inauguration as had been customary until then.

== See also ==
- 2002 Colombian presidential election
- Álvaro Uribe
- Francisco Santos
- First inauguration of Juan Manuel Santos
