= Colombian presidential inauguration =

Ceremony marking the start of a new Colombian presidential term

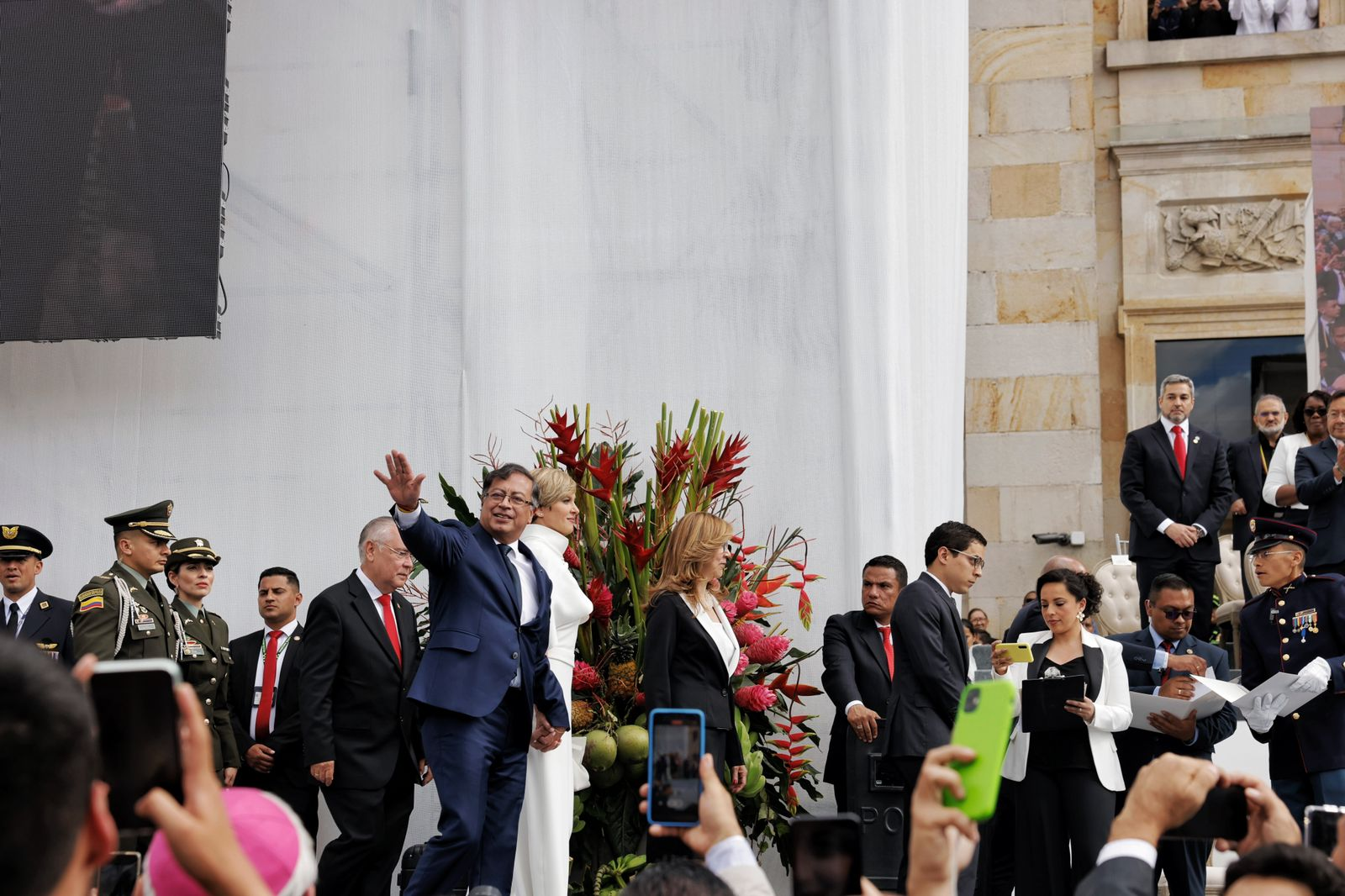
Inauguration of Gustavo Petro, August 7, 2022, in the Plaza de Bolívar

After forty-nine days after the presidential election, the president-elect of Colombia is inaugurated as president through the presidential oath.

The first inauguration of Rafael Núñez took place on June 4, 1887. The rest of the presidential inaugurations have taken place on August 7, starting in 1898. In order to preserve the symbolism between August 7 and the change in the presidential administration, this takes place obligatorily without discretion of the day.

The recitation of the presidential oath is included in Article 192 of the Constitution. Although it is not a constitutional requirement, the president of the Senate is the one who administers the presidential oath. The inauguration ceremony takes place at the central front of the National Capitol, depending on the needs of the president-elect. Some presidents have had their inaugurations in the Elliptical Hall.

Over the years various traditions have arisen and disappeared, shaping the style of the ceremony today. The ceremony itself is broadcast live on Colombia's major commercial cable news and television networks; several of them also broadcast it live on their websites.

== Inauguration ceremonies ==
=== Dates ===
The first inauguration of Rafael Núñez took place on June 4, 1898 after Núñez's death on September 18, 1894, Vice President Miguel Antonio Caro would take office on the same day, Caro's successor, Manuel Antonio Sanclemente would be the second president to be sworn in on August 7, previously Carlos Holguín Mallarino would have been sworn in as president following Núñez's resignation on August 7, 1888, marking a tradition later established in the Constitution of 1886. In 1953, following the resignation of Laureano Gómez and the opposition of Roberto Urdaneta to succeed him, Gustavo Rojas Pinilla was inaugurated as president on June 13, 1953. This made him the first and only president in 55 years to take office on a different date. Four years later, Alberto Lleras Camargo took office for his second term on August 7, 1958, reestablishing the tradition that continues to this day.

August 7 is not regulated in any official document as Inauguration Day, but by virtue of the tradition and symbolism of this day with the Independence of Colombia, all presidents from 1898 to 1953 and since 1958 have held their presidential inaugurations on this day.

=== Locations ===
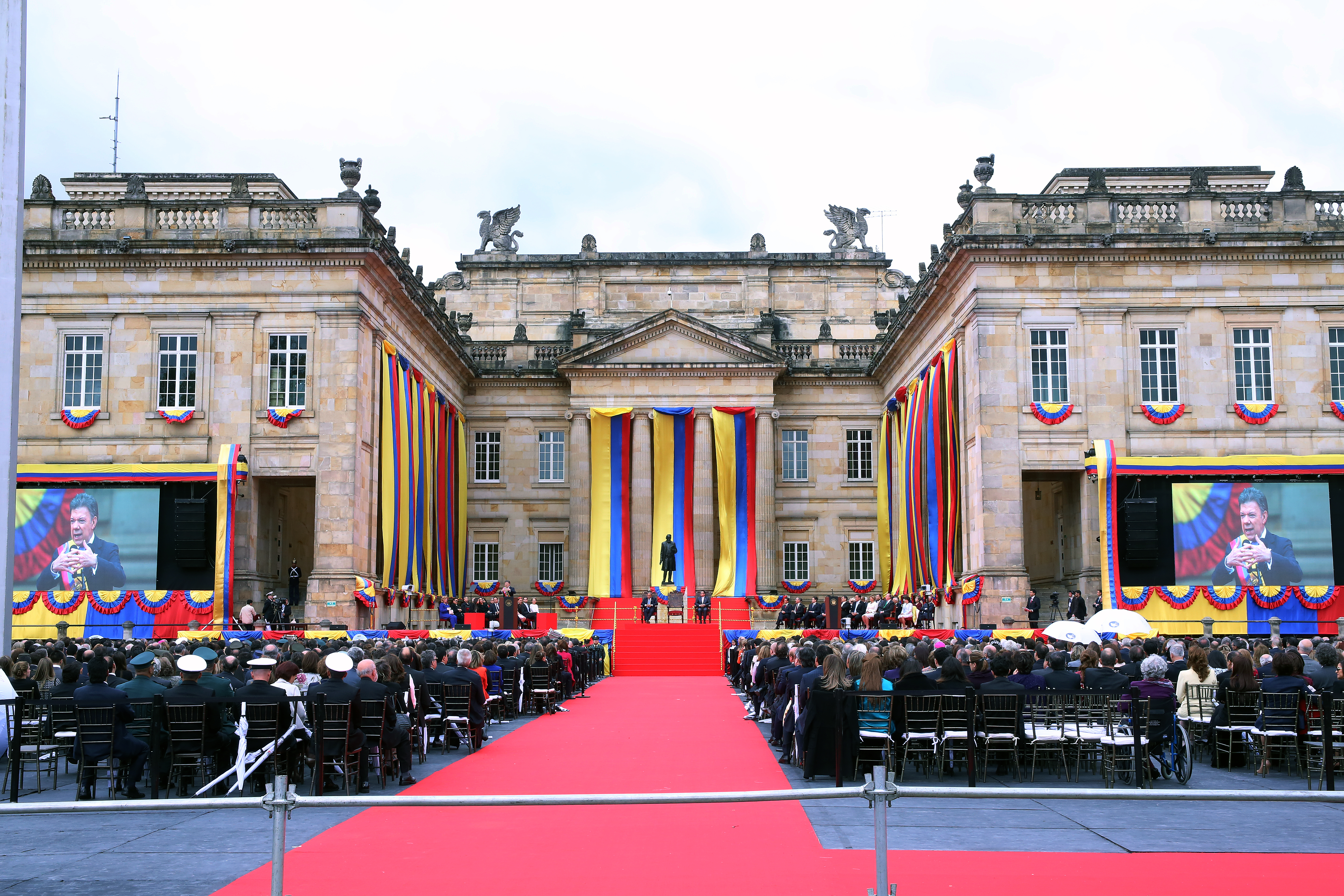
Presidential inauguration at the rear front of the National Capitol – Juan Manuel Santos, August 7, 2014

Most presidential inaugurations have taken place in the Elliptical Hall of the Senate. Since 1990, the inaugurations of all presidents have taken place in the central front with the exception of Álvaro Uribe in 2002 and 2006. In 2014 the second inauguration of Juan Manuel Santos took place in the rear front of the National Capitol.

=== Attendees ===
In addition to the public, inauguration attendees generally include members of Congress, high-ranking military officers, mayors, governors, former presidents, former vice presidents, and foreign political leaders. Cermonially, the outgoing president does not attend the immediate inauguration at the end of his presidential administration, only one president has broken with this tradition, Álvaro Uribe being the only outgoing president since 1990 to attend the inauguration of the incoming president.

== Ceremonial aspects ==
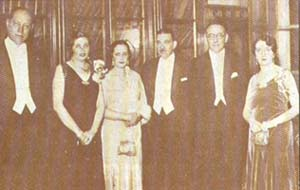
First ladies and presidents (from left to right) Clemencia Holguín de Urdaneta, Alfonso López Pumarejo, Roberto Urdaneta, María Teresa Londoño de Olaya, María Michelsen de López and Enrique Olaya Herrera at the Jockey Club during the Inaugural Ball on August 7, 1934

The inauguration procedure is governed by tradition rather than the Constitution, with the only constitutionally required procedure being the presidential oath. Traditionally, the president-elect and his family take a tour to the Plaza de Bolívar that begins at the San Carlos Palace. After the presidential oath, the president goes to the Casa de Nariño where he is greeted by the outgoing president, who subsequently says goodbye to him. Usually then the president takes over some of the members of his cabinet.

=== Parade ===
The parade begins at the San Carlos Palace, where the president-elect, accompanied by his family and escorted by twelve pipers from the Navy, walks along Tenth Street to the National Capitol. Some presidents have preferred not to hold this parade and simply go to the Capitol from the Casa de Nariño.

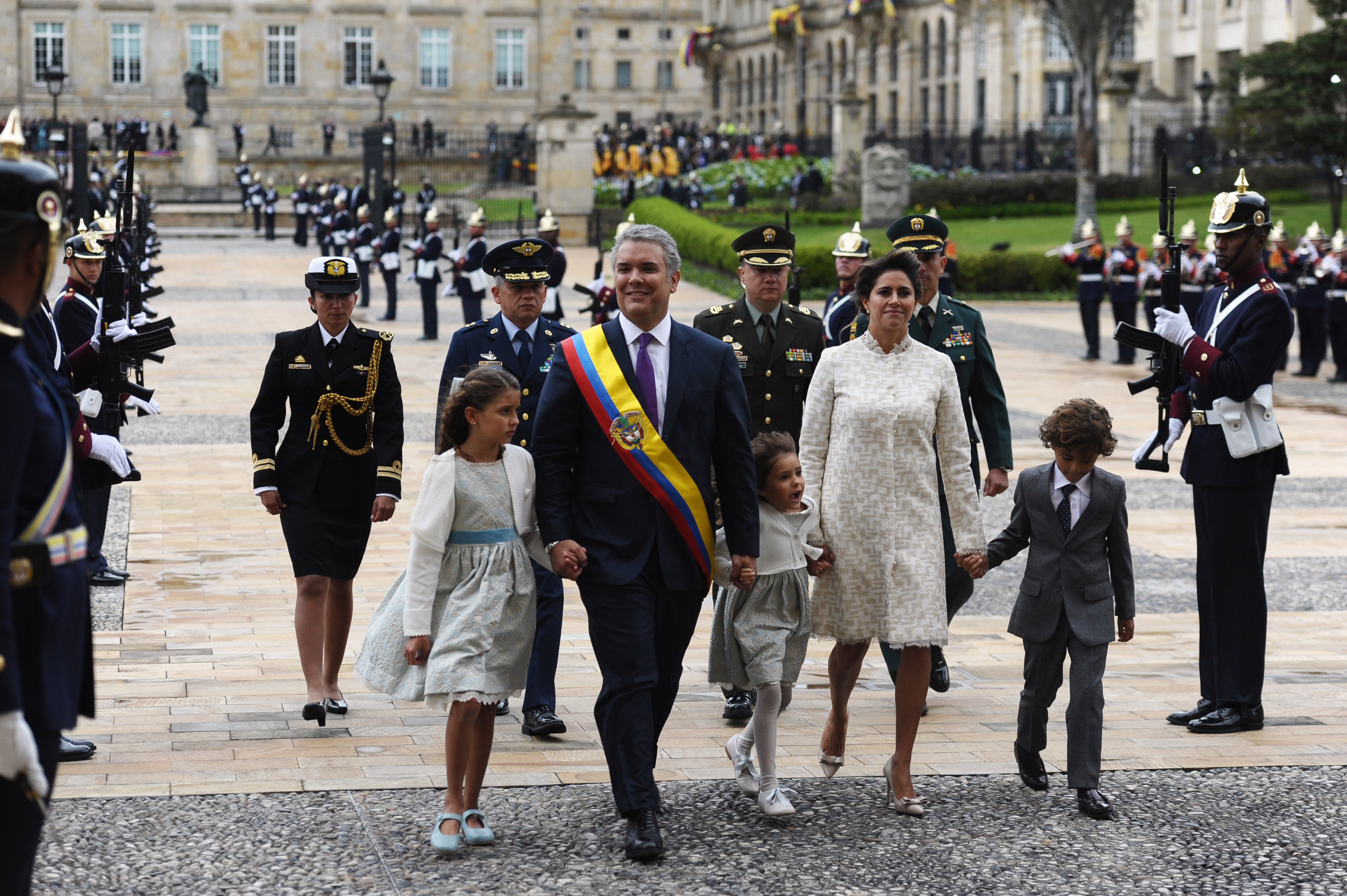
President Iván Duque with First Lady María Juliana Ruiz and their children Matías, Luciana and Eloísa during their arrive to the Casa de Nariño – August 7, 2018.

=== Oaths of office ===
The vice president takes office in the same ceremony as the president. The oath is first administered to the president. Immediately after the vice president, the Military Forces will immediately perform the official salute from the Boyacá Bridge. The current form, which is also recited by senators, representatives and other government officials, has been in use since 1991:

The oath begins with the person who administers it lying down. Invoking the protection of God, you swear before this corporation that represents the people of Colombia, to faithfully and legally fulfill the duties that the position of President of the Republic or Vice President of the Republic imposes on you in accordance with the Constitution and the laws.

I swear to God and promise to the people to faithfully comply with the constitution and laws of Colombia.

Some presidents and vice presidents often add a personal phrase at the end of the oath. In 2022, during the 32nd presidential inauguration, Francia Márquez added the phrase Until Dignity Becomes Customary.

=== Military honors ===
The military honors to the president begin immediately upon his arrival at the Casa de Nariño, on some occasions the honors are given in the Plaza de Bolívar. The generals of the Army, the Air Force, the Navy, the National Police, the Military Forces and the General of the Joint Chiefs of Staff surround the president to review the troops. The musical bands of the Military Forces sing together the Salute to the Flag. Since the Inauguration of Iván Duque in 2018, the review of troops usually ends with a minute of silence in honor of all soldiers who died in combat.

== Other elements ==
Over the years various traditions have been eliminated or simply not included again. Between 1930 and 1950, the inauguration used to be an event of social relevance among the upper classes of Bogotá. However, on some occasions, whether due to the preferences of the new president or other restrictive circumstances, significant events have been removed from the ceremony. In 1994 during the presidential inauguration of Ernesto Samper due to the adoption of the 1991 Constitution, the passage through the Minor Basilica of the Sacred Heart of Jesus of Bogotá was omitted. Twenty-two presidents passed through the Cathedral during their respective inaugurations.
