= First inauguration of Juan Manuel Santos =

2010 Colombian presidential inaugurtation

First presidential inauguration of Juan Manuel Santos
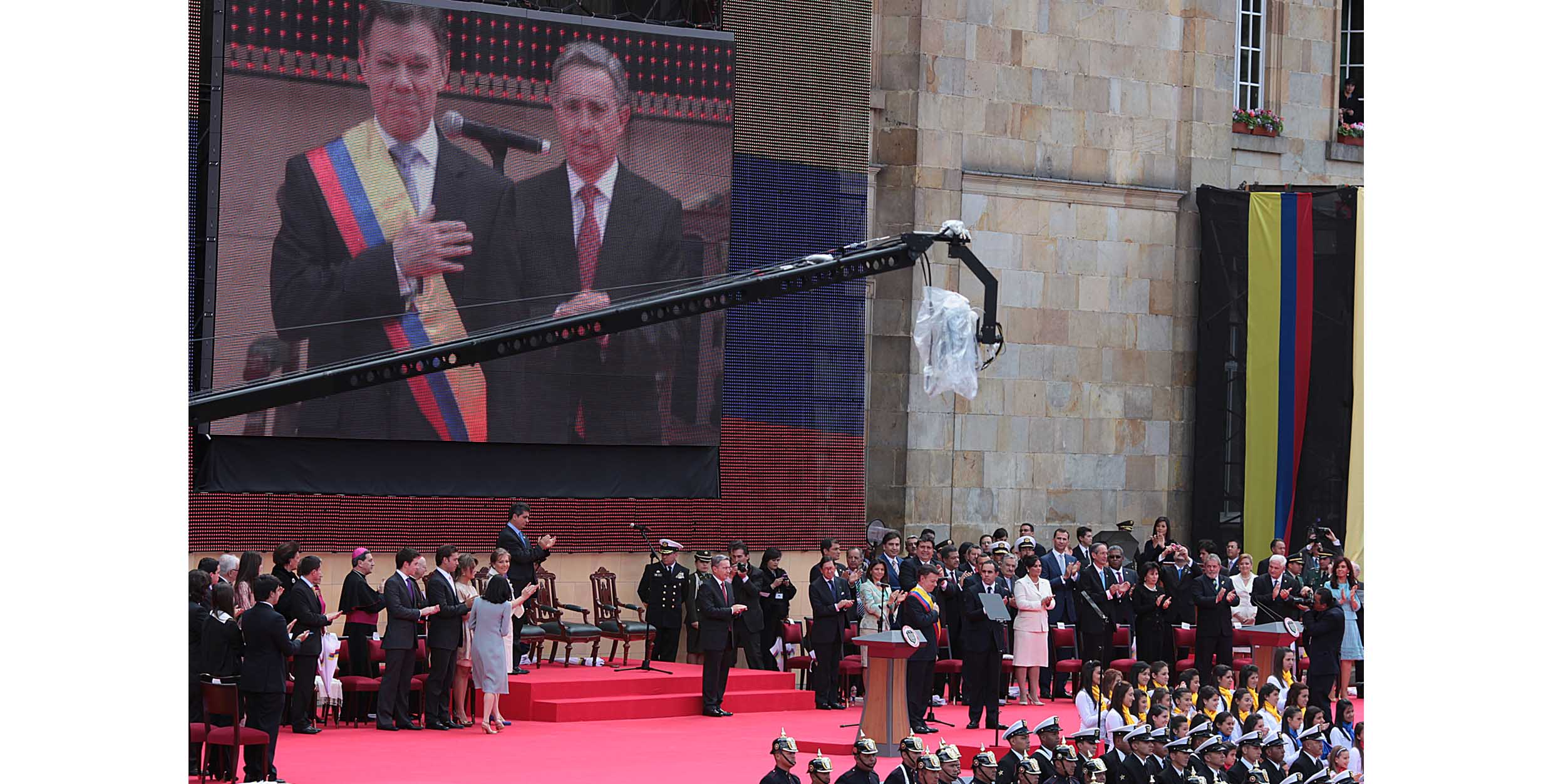
- First Inauguration of Juan Manuel Santos
- Date: 7 August 2010; 15 years ago
- Time: 3:00 pm (COST)
- Location: National Capitol Bogotá, D.C.
- Participants: Juan Manuel Santos; 32nd president of Colombia — Assuming office Angelino Garzón; 9th vice president of Colombia — Assuming office Armando Benedetti; President of Congress — Administering oath Álvaro Uribe; 31st president of Colombia — Leaving office

Juan Manuel Santos's first inauguration as the 32th President of Colombia took place on Saturday, August 7, 2010, marking the start of Juan Manuel Santos's first four-year term as president and Angelino Garzón as vice president. The 29th presidential inauguration took place as usual in the central front of the National Capitol in Bogotá, D.C. Santos was sworn in as presidential oath, after which Garzón was sworn in as vice president

The ceremony took place in the midst of the attacks carried out by the FARC, days after the inauguration ceremony. For the first time in history, a president received a staff of office and an indigenous ceremony by the indigenous Arhuacos. Days before the inauguration. On Thursday, August 5, in the Sierra Nevada de Santa Marta.

== Schedule ==
Juan Manuel Santos left the San Carlos Palace at 3:30 accompanied by his wife María Clemencia and his children Martín, María Antonia and Esteban. They were escorted by the Generals of the Colombian Military Forces, the Chief of the Joint Chiefs of Staff, the National Army, the National Navy, the Air Force and the National Police, who were followed by thirty members of Congress. During his walk to the Plaza de Bolívar, the band of the José María Córdoba Military Cadet School performed honors, officially starting the opening ceremony. Upon their arrival, the President-elect and his family were met by President Uribe. Santos received the oath and the presidential sash from the president of the Senate, Armando Benedetti, 15 salutes were fired from the Bridge of Boyacá, by the Colombian Military Forces to greet the new president, and then Santos administered the vice presidential oath to Angelino Garzón. After the vice-presidential oath, Santos continued with his inaugural speech of 32 minutes and 42 seconds. The president and his family were escorted again by the seven generals of the Military Forces, who were followed by twelve Navy Pipers. Upon arrival, the president and his family received military honors from the Presidential Guard, and then the President and his family prepared to greet former President Álvaro Uribe, his wife Lina, his children Tomas and Jeronimo, former Vice President Francisco Santos, his wife María Victoria and their children Benjamín, Gabriel, Carmen and Pedro. Then former President Uribe and former Vice President Santos and their families left the Casa de Nariño and continued their exit through the Plaza de Núñez.

== Assistants ==
=== Foreign leaders ===
Foreign leaders who attended were;

- Cristina Fernández de Kirchner, President of Argentina
- Luiz Inácio Lula da Silva, President of Brazil
- Laura Chinchilla, President of Costa Rica
- Leonel Fernández, President of Dominican Republic
- Rafael Correa, President of Ecuador
- Mauricio Funes, President of El Salvador
- (Georgia (country)) Mikheil Saakashvili, President of Georgia
- Álvaro Colom, President of Guatemala
- Jean-Max Bellerive, Prime Minister of Haiti
- Xiomara Castro, First Lady of Honduras (representing President Manuel Zelaya)
- Bruce Golding, Prime Minister of Jamaica
- Felipe Calderón, President of Mexico
- Ricardo Martinelli, President of Panama
- Alan García, President of Peru
- (Spain) The Prince of Asturias (representing Juan Carlos I)

=== Former presidents ===
- Former President César Gaviria and Ana Milena Muñoz de Gaviria
- Former President Ernesto Samper and Jacquin Strouss de Samper
- Former President Andrés Pastrana and Nohra Puyana de Pastrana

== See also ==
- 2010 Colombian presidential election
- Juan Manuel Santos
- Angelino Garzón
- Second inauguration of Juan Manuel Santos
