= Inauguration of Iván Duque =

2018 Colombian presidential inaugurtation

Presidential inauguration of Iván Duque
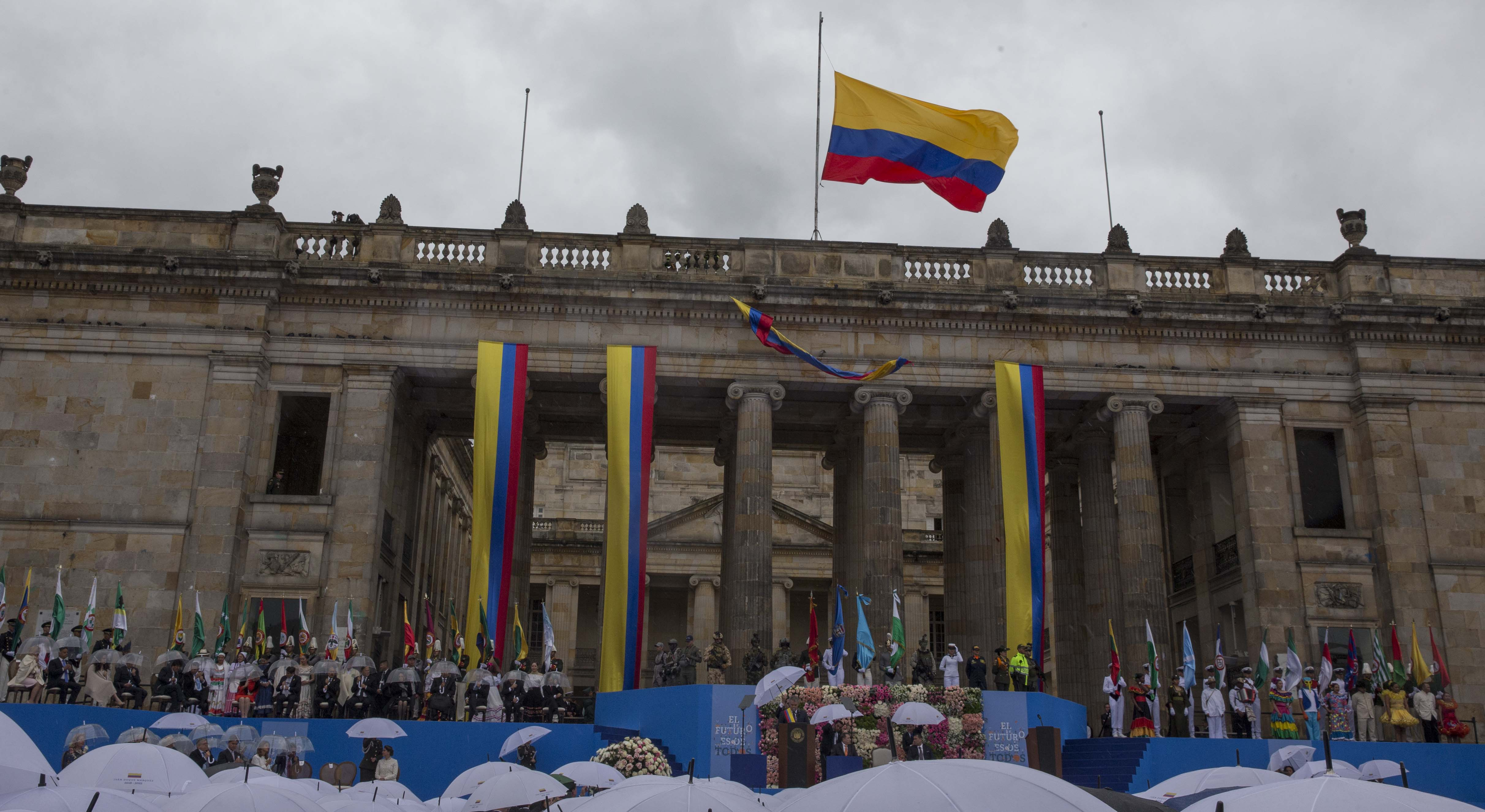
- Presidential Inauguration of Iván Duque
- Date: 7 August 2018; 7 years ago
- Time: 2:00 pm (COST)
- Location: National Capitol Bogotá, D.C.
- Participants: Iván Duque; 33rd president of Colombia — Assuming office Marta Lucía Ramírez; 12th vice president of Colombia — Assuming office Ernesto Macías; President of the Senate — Administering oath Juan Manuel Santos; 32nd president of Colombia — Leaving office

Iván Duque's inauguration as the 33rd President of Colombia took place on Tuesday, August 7, 2018, marking the start of Iván Duque's four-year term as president and Marta Lucía Ramírez as vice president. The 31st presidential inauguration took place as usual in the central front of the National Capitol in Bogotá, D.C. Duque was sworn in as presidential oath, after which Ramírez was sworn in as vice president.

== Schedule ==
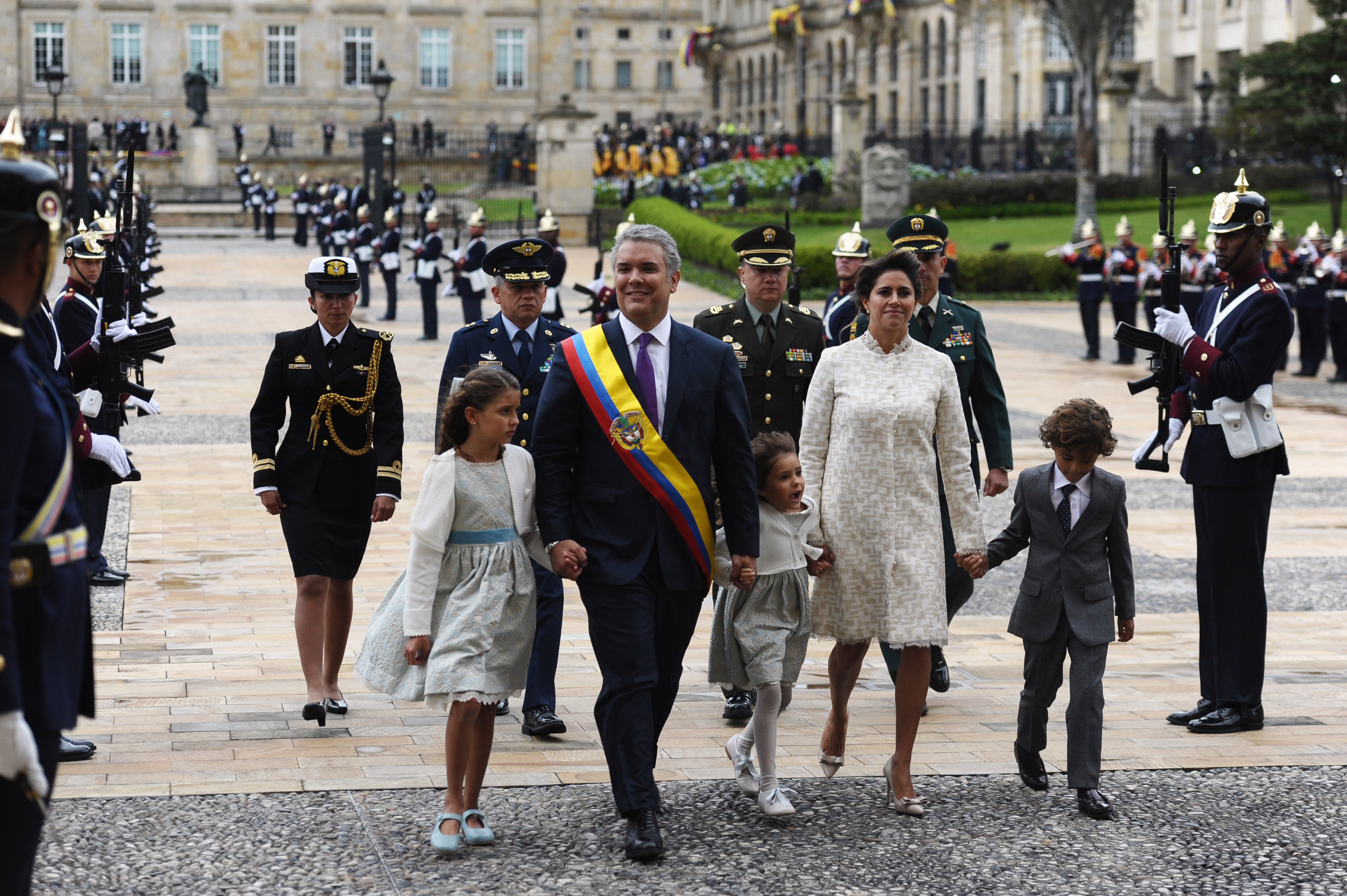
Duque and his family arriving at the Casa de Nariño.

Iván Duque left the San Carlos Palace at 2:00 p.m accompanied by his wife María Juliana and his children Matías, Luciana and Eloísa escorted by twelve Navy Pipers during his walk to the Plaza de Bolívar. The band of the José María Córdoba Military Cadet School performed the honors, officially starting the opening ceremony. Upon his arrival, Duque received the oath and the presidential sash from the president of the Senate, Ernesto Macías, 15 salutes were fired from the Bridge of Boyacá by the Colombian Military Forces to greet the new president, and Duque administered the vice presidential oath to Marta Lucía Ramírez as vice president of Colombia. After the vice presidential oath, Duque made his inaugural speech of 35 minutes and 40 seconds.

Duque received military honors from the Colombian Military Forces and passed the review in the company of the Generals of the Military Forces, the Chief of the Joint Chiefs of Staff, the National Army, the National Navy, the Air Force and the National Police. They then held a minute of silence for the soldiers who fell in combat. Five Kfir aircraft flew overhead to salute. The president and his family were escorted by four Admirals of the National Army, the National Navy, the Air Force and the National Police, where they were received by a street of honor carried out by the Presidential Guard. Then the president and his family prepared to greet former President Juan Manuel Santos, his wife María Clemencia, his children Esteban, María Antonia and his son-in-law Sebastian. Former President Santos and his family left the Casa de Nariño and continued with their exit through the Plaza de Núñez.

== Inaugural address ==
During his inauguration speech, he stated that he comes with the idea of uniting Colombians, after the polarization in which he has been immersed in recent years.

As president of Colombians, he mentioned, during the first part of his speech, the bicentennial of Colombia's independence, which will be celebrated next year, with which he invited Colombians to "leave their egos to forge a common purpose".

He also pointed out that "when we unite as a people, nothing stops us. When we all contribute, we are capable of realizing our own feats that not even magical realism is capable of imagining", which is why he stressed that the history of Colombia makes it clear that we are a brave, hard-working nation that does not give up at the first sound.

"Today from this majestic square that bears the name of our Liberator Simón Bolívar, I want to thank God and the Colombian people for giving me the honor of leading the destinies of the Homeland."

— Iván Duque, Inaugural speech 2018

== Assistants ==
=== Foreign leaders ===
Foreign leaders who attended were;

- Mauricio Macri, President of Argentina
- Evo Morales, President of Bolivia
- Sebastián Piñera, President of Chile
- Epsy Campbell, First Vice President of Costa Rica
- Danilo Medina, President of Dominican Republic
- Lenín Moreno, President of Ecuador
- Felipe González, Former Prime Minister of Spain
- Jimmy Morales, President of Guatemala
- Juan Orlando Hernández, President of Honduras
- Juan Carlos Varela, President of Panama
- Alicia Pucheta, Vice President of Paraguay
- Enrique Peña Nieto, President of Mexico
- Nikki Haley, United States Ambassador to the United Nations

=== Former presidents ===
- Former President César Gaviria and Ana Milena Muñoz de Gaviria
- Former President Ernesto Samper and Jacquin Strouss
- Former President Andrés Pastrana and Nohra Puyana de Pastrana
- Former President Álvaro Uribe and Lina Moreno de Uribe

== See also ==
- 2018 Colombian presidential election
- Iván Duque
- Marta Lucía Ramírez
- Inauguration of Gustavo Petro
