= Inauguration of Gustavo Petro =

2022 Colombian presidential inauguration

Presidential inauguration of Gustavo Petro
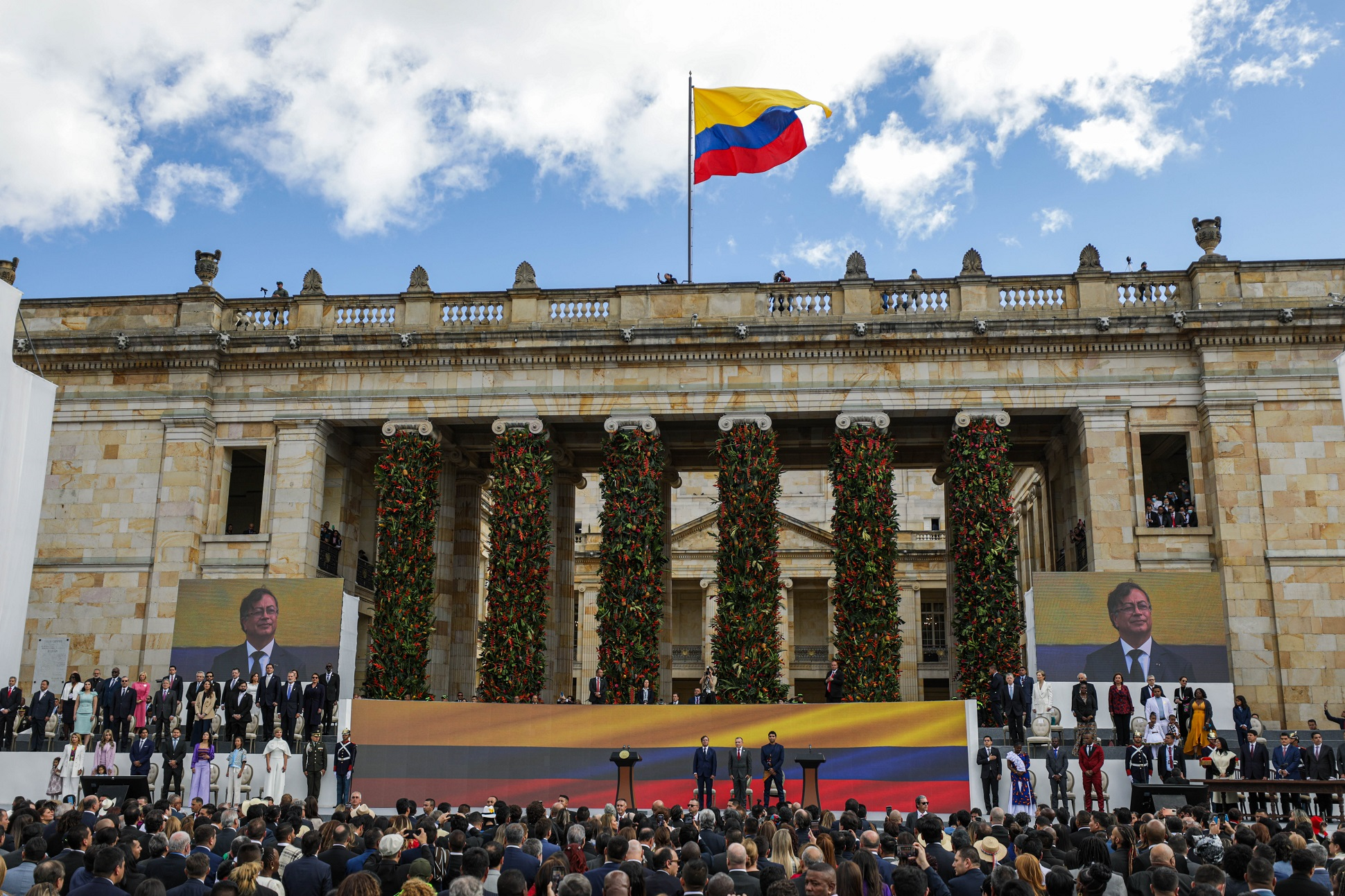
- Presidential inauguration ceremony
- Date: August 7, 2022; 4 years ago
- Time: 2:00 pm (COST)
- Location: National Capitol Bogotá, D.C.
- Participants: Gustavo Petro; 37th president of Colombia — Assuming office Francia Márquez; 13th vice president of Colombia — Assuming office Roy Barreras; President of the Senate — Administering oath Iván Duque; 36th president of Colombia — Leaving office

Gustavo Petro's inauguration as the 37th President of Colombia took place on Sunday, August 7, 2022, marking the start of Gustavo Petro's four-year term as President and Francia Márquez as vice president. The 36th presidential inauguration took place as usual in the central front of the National Capitol in Bogotá, D.C. Petro was sworn in as presidential oath, after which Márquez was sworn in as Vice President.

The inauguration took place amid the political polarization experienced during the 2022 Colombian presidential election, the festivities featured a wide variety of demonstrations by fans. The live audience was almost unlimited, being the first time that the event was almost exclusively for the public, marking a milestone in presidential inauguration events by being generally a private event; Members of Congress as well as the people to the full attended the event, which resembles a speech from a united Colombia.

== Context ==
The inauguration marked the formal culmination of the presidential transition of Gustavo Petro, who had become president-elect after defeating Rodolfo Hernández on June 19, 2022. The victory of Petro and his running mate, Francia Márquez, was formalized by the certification of the National Electoral Council on June 23, 2022. In a message to the nation, Duque congratulated the Colombian people on their election.

After his inauguration, Petro became the president with the highest voter turnout in history. He also became the first president of Córdoba, the first leftist, and the third former mayor of Bogotá to be elected president after Andrés Pastrana. Márquez became the second woman to hold national elected office and the first Afro-Colombian vice president.

== Planning ==
The ceremony set a record for being the first in history with the largest audience. For the first time in twenty years, no carpets were used along the path to the center stage in the Plaza de Bolívar.

=== Ceremony ===
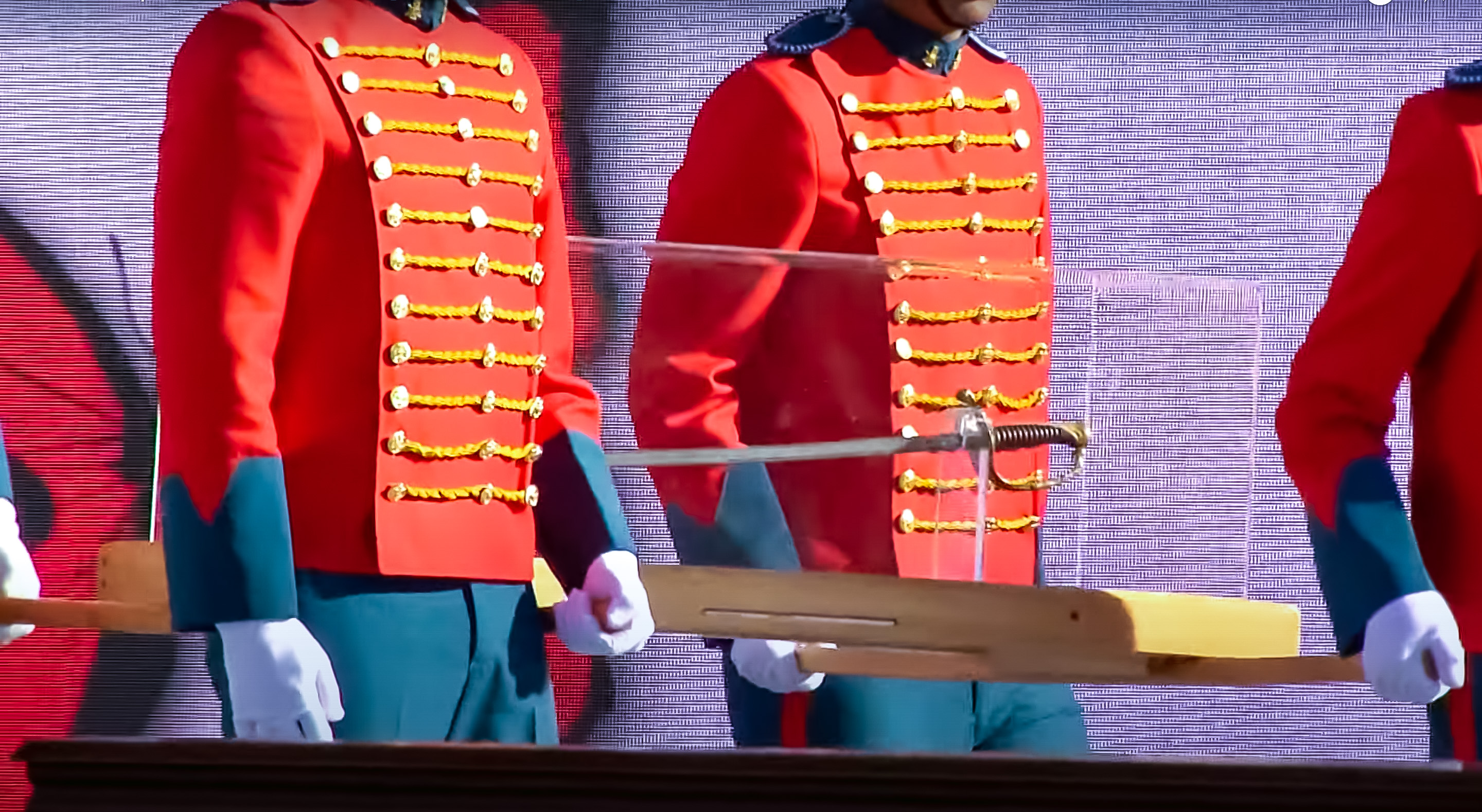
Members of the Honor Guard of the Casa de Nariño escorting the Sword of Bolívar.

The presidential inauguration ceremony began at 3:00 p.m. when Gustavo Petro made his way from the San Carlos Palace to Plaza de Bolívar via Carrera Decima. Senate Secretary General Gregorio Eljach opened the session by reading the Agenda. The Bogotá Philharmonic Orchestra played the National Anthem of Colombia. Pianist Teresita Gómez performed Frédéric Chopin's Second Nocturne, Op. 9, during the arrival of the Sword of Bolívar. The Military Forces Bands sang the Salute to the Flag as a farewell to Iván Duque. Senate President Roy Barreras opened the ceremony with a brief speech. Petro took the oath of office and received the presidential sash from Senator María José Pizarro. Márquez was sworn in as the first Afro-Colombian to take office.

For the first time in the history of a presidential inauguration ceremony, the Sword of Bolivar was displayed. It was escorted by members of the Honor Guard of the 37th Infantry Presidential Guard Battalion. The organizing committee had requested permission from the Duque administration to display it on the platform during the inauguration, a request that failed to materialize by the morning of August 7. Petro had expressed interest in having the sword at his side during his inaugural address. His first request to the Military House of the Casa de Nariño was to display and transport it to the platform, thus marking his first executive order as president.

=== Attendees ===
Gustavo Petro's inauguration marked the first inauguration with unlimited public attendance as well as the first for a leftist president in Colombian history.

Former presidents César Gaviria, Ernesto Samper and Juan Manuel Santos (Petro's former opponent in 2010) attended the inauguration. Former first ladies Ana Milena Muñoz de Gaviria, Jacquin Strouss de Samper and María Clemencia de Santos also attended. While former presidents Andrés Pastrana and Álvaro Uribe were absent. Argentine President Alberto Fernández, Bolivian President Luis Arce, Chilean President Gabriel Boric and First Lady Irina Karamanos, Costa Rican President Rodrigo Chaves, Dominican President Luis Abinader, Ecuatorian President Guillermo Lasso, Honduran President Xiomara Castro, Paraguayan President Mario Abdo Benítez and Spanish King Felipe VI. Also present Vice President of El Salvador Félix Ulloa, Vice President of Iran Mohammad Hossein Adeli, Vice President of Peru Dina Boluarte, Vice President of Panama José Gabriel Carrizo, Vice President of Uruguay Beatriz Argimón, the First Lady of Mexico Beatriz Gutiérrez Müller represented President Andrés Manuel López Obrador. Also present were the Ministers of Foreign Affairs, Carlos Alberto França of Brazil, Antonia Urrejola of Chile, Bruno Rodríguez Parrilla of Cuba, Riyad al-Maliki of Palestine, Erika Mouynes of Panama, João Gomes Cravinho of Portugal and Nikola Selaković of Serbia. The Prime Minister of Curazao Gilmar Pisas, Prime Minister of Guyana Mark Philips and Mignon Bowen-Phillips, Secretary of Foreign Affairs of Mexico Marcelo Ebrard, President of the Algerian Parliament Ibrahim Boughali, the Administrator of the United States Agency for International Development Samantha Power, Member of the Japanese Parliament Shunichi Yamaguchi and Member of the Korean Parliament Park Duk-hyum.

=== Oaths of office ===
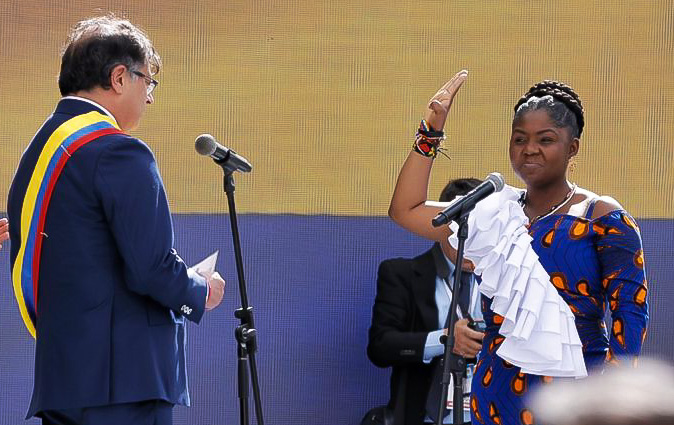
Márquez takes the oath of office, administered by President Gustavo Petro.

President of the Senate, Roy Barreras administered Petro's oath of office at 3:30 p.m., with 10 minutes remaining in Duque's term. Petro recited the following, as prescribed by the Constitution:

I swear to God and promise to the people to faithfully comply with the constitution and laws of Colombia.

After completing the oath, the 37th Infantry Presidential Guard Battalion fired a 21-gun cannon salute from the José María Córdova Military School.

President Gustavo Petro then administered the oath of office to Márquez at 3:35 p.m., with 20 minutes remaining until Ramírez's term ended. Márquez recited the following, as prescribed by the Constitution:

I swear to God and to the people to faithfully comply with the constitution and laws of Colombia, I also swear before my ancestors and ancestress, until dignity becomes a custom.

=== Post-ceremony events ===
Following the inauguration ceremony, the Petro family was greeted by former President Iván Duque and former First Lady María Juliana Ruiz at a farewell ceremony at the Casa de Nariño. The Petros exchanged goodbyes with the Duques on the steps, where their greeting was described by the press as "cold". Meanwhile, some members of Iván Duque's cabinet accompanied him as he left through the main square. After the Duques' departure, President Petro swore in some of the previously announced members of his cabinet.

== Television broadcast ==
=== Colombian broadcasters coverage ===
The coverage began early at 9:00 in the morning, the main television and radio networks in the country settled in a press room and exclusive boxes for the official broadcast.

Media such as Caracol Television, RCN, Red Mas and Señal Colombia carried out exclusive coverage of the presidential inauguration minute by minute, with the analysis of each symbology and an interpretation of the long-awaited opening speech by Gustavo Petro.

== See also ==
- 2022 Colombian presidential election
- Gustavo Petro 2022 presidential campaign
- Presidency of Gustavo Petro
- Gustavo Petro
- Francia Márquez
