= Second inauguration of Álvaro Uribe =

2006 Colombian presidential inaugurtation

Second presidential inauguration of Álvaro Uribe
- Date: 7 August 2006; 19 years ago
- Time: 3:00 pm (COST)
- Location: National Capitol Bogotá, D.C.
- Participants: Álvaro Uribe; 31st president of Colombia — Assuming office Francisco Santos; 9th vice president of Colombia — Assuming office Dilian Francisca Toro; President of the Senate — Administering oath

The second inauguration of Álvaro Uribe as the 31st president of Colombia and Francisco Santos 9th vice president marked the beginning of his second term in the Chamber of Nariño as Álvaro Uribe's head of state, being the fourth president of Colombia to be reelected for a second term, since the last one was Alfonso López Pumarejo in 1946.

The event was the 44th presidential inauguration. Held in Bogotá, D.C., as of August 7, 2006, the inaugural acts such as the oath and the speech in the open square were suppressed to take place in the senate facilities.

== Ceremony ==
The ceremony took place in the facilities of the National Capitol, in the middle of a wide security ring, after a series of attacks prior to the inauguration ceremony attributed to the FARC, one of the main opponents of Uribe's election.

The ceremony began as usual at 3:00 p.m. standard hours, the President and Vice President in the company of their wives entered the National Capitol in the company of their respective families, after said act Dilian Francisca Toro, president of the Senate and leader A natural member of Congress, he prepared to take the oath of office to Álvaro Uribe as the 31st president of Colombia for a second consecutive term and immediately afterwards he prepared to impose the presidential sash, which was supplied by him incorrectly, which was corrected at instant.

== See also ==
- 2006 Colombian presidential election
- Álvaro Uribe
- Francisco Santos
- Inauguration of Gustavo Petro
