= Second inauguration of Juan Manuel Santos =

2014 Colombian presidential inaugurtation

Second presidential inauguration of Juan Manuel Santos
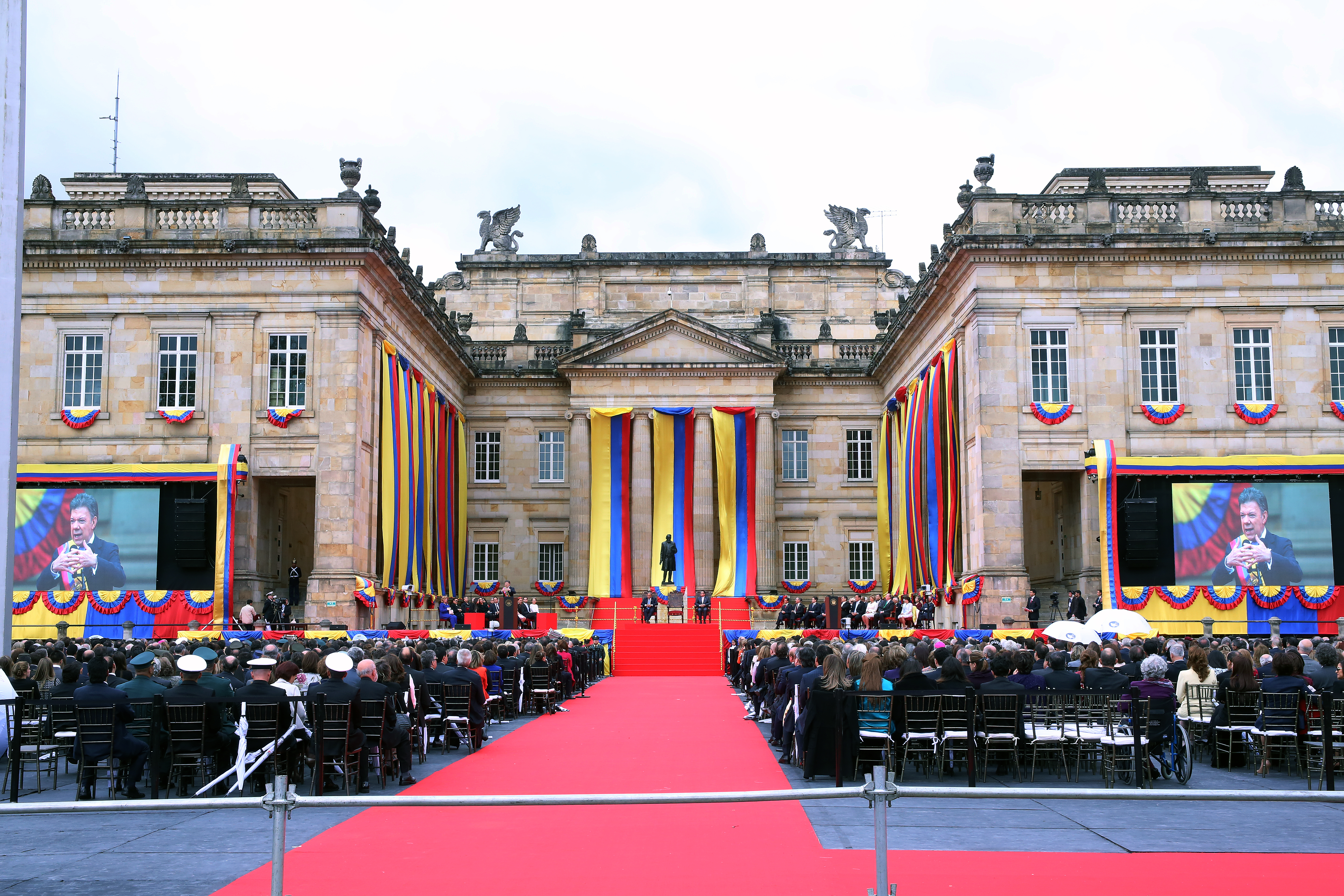
- Second Inauguration of Juan Manuel Santos
- Date: 7 August 2014; 11 years ago
- Time: 3:30 pm (COST)
- Location: National Capitol Bogotá, D.C.
- Participants: Juan Manuel Santos; 32nd president of Colombia — Assuming office Germán Vargas Lleras; 10th vice president of Colombia — Assuming office Ernesto Macías; President of the Senate — Administering oath

Juan Manuel Santos's second inauguration as the 32th President of Colombia took place on Thursday, August 7, 2014, marking the start of his second four-year term as president. The 30th presidential inauguration took place in the rear front of the National Capitol in Bogotá, D.C. Santos was sworn in with the presidential oath, after which Germán Vargas Lleras was sworn in as vice president.

== Schedule ==
Juan Manuel Santos left the Casa de Nariño at 3:30 p.m. accompanied by his wife María Clemencia and his children Martín, María Antonia and Esteban. The presidential family was followed by twenty children dressed in white to Plaza Núñez. Upon his arrival, Santos and his family greeted thirty members of Congress who were waiting for him in the gallery. The band of the José María Córdoba Military Cadet School performed honors, officially starting the ceremony. The philharmonics of the National Army, the National Navy, the Air Force and a Youth Choir of thirty children performed the National Anthem of Colombia. Santos received the oath and the presidential sash from the president of the Senate, José David Name. 20 salutes were fired by the forces of the Presidential Guard, from the Bridge of Boyacá, to greet the president, after which Santos administered the vice presidential oath to Germán Vargas Lleras as vice president of Colombia.

José David Name, President of the Senate, made a small intervention. Santos continued with his inaugural speech of 35 minutes and 32 seconds. The president reviewed the troops accompanied by the Minister of Justice Juan Carlos Pinzon and the Generals of the Military Forces, the Joint Chiefs of Staff, the National Army, the National Navy, the Air Force and the National Police, where he received Military Honors from the Presidential Guard. Six Kfir aircraft flew over to greet the president and his family. A minute of silence was held in honor of the soldiers who fell in combat and immediately afterwards the president and his family walked to the Casa de Nariño escorted by nine Navy Pipers.

== Assistants ==
=== Foreign leaders ===
Foreign leaders who attended were;

- Enrique Peña Nieto, President of Mexico
- Danilo Medina, President of Dominican Republic
- Juan Orlando Hernández, President of Honduras and Ana García Carías, First Lady of Honduras
- Juan Carlos Varela, President of Panama and Lorena Castillo, First Lady of Panama
- Horacio Cartes, President of Paraguay and Sara Cartes
- Rafael Correa, President of Ecuador
- Ollanta Humala, President of Peru
- Otto Pérez, President of Guatemala
- Donald Ramotar, President of Guyana
- King Juan Carlos I of Spain
- Laurent Lamothe, Prime Minister of Haiti
- (Curaçao) Ivar Asjes Prime Minister of Curazao
- Helio Fallas Venegas, First Vice President of Costa Rica and Núria Más de Fallas
- Óscar Ortiz, Vice President of El Salvador
- Omar Halleslevens, Vice President of Nicaragua
- Michel Temer, Vice President of Brazil
- Danilo Astori, Vice President of Uruguay
- Amado Boudou, Vice President of Argentina
- Paulo Portas, Vice President of Portugal
- Gladys Benjarano, Vice President of the Council of State of Cuba
- Isabella Allende, President of the Senate of Chile
- (Morocco) Rachid Talbi Alami, Speaker of House of Representatives of Marocco
- (European Union) Herman Van Rompuy, President of European Council and Geertrui Windels

=== International organizations ===
- José Miguel Insulza, General Secretary of the OEA
- Rebeca Grynspan, Ibero-American General Secretary
- Luis Alberto Moreno, President of IADB
- Enrique García, President of the CAF

=== Local leaders ===
- Luis Erenesto Vargas, President of the Constitutional Court
- Leonidas Bustos, President of the Supreme Court of Justice
- María Claudia Rojas, President of the Council of State
- Francisco Ricaute, President of the Superior Council of the Judiciary
- Pablo Gil de la Hoz, President of the National Electoral Council
- Eduardo Montealegre, Attorney General of the Nation and Tatiana Hérnandez
- Alejandro Ordoñéz, General Procuror Prosecutro General of the Nation and Beatriz Hérnandez
- Sandra Morelli, Comptroller General of the Nation
- Carlos Ariel Sánchez, National Registrar
- Jorge Armando Otalora, Ombudsman
- Gustavo Petro, Superior Mayor of Bogotá

=== Others ===
- Cecilia Paz de Mosquera

=== Former presidents ===
- Former President Belisario Betancur and Dalita Navarro
- Former President César Gaviria and Ana Milena Muñoz de Gaviria
- Former President Ernesto Samper and Jacquin Strouss

=== Former vice presidents ===
- Former Vice President Humberto de la Calle
- Former Vice President Gustavo Bell and María Mercedes de la Espriella
- Former Vice President Angelino Garzón and Montserrat Muñoz de Garzón
  - Former Second lady Marta Blanco de Lemos

== See also ==
- 2014 Colombian presidential election
- Juan Manuel Santos
- Germán Vargas Lleras
- Inauguration of Iván Duque
