= Inauguration of Juan Manuel Santos =

Inauguration of Juan Manuel Santos may refer to:

- First inauguration of Juan Manuel Santos, 2010
- Second inauguration of Juan Manuel Santos, 2014
