= Inauguration of Álvaro Uribe =

Inauguration of Álvaro Uribe may refer to:

- First inauguration of Álvaro Uribe, 2002
- Second inauguration of Álvaro Uribe, 2006
