= Thomas Reed (architect) =

Danish architect

Thomas Reed (1817–1878), was a Danish architect born in the 19th century in the Saint Croix Island (at the time when it was a dependent territory of the Kingdom of Denmark).

He studied in Germany and England, and arrived in the Republic of New Granada in 1847. In Bogotá he was contracted to build the New Granada National Capitol by the president Tomás Cipriano de Mosquera. He also designed the Panopticon prison which was adapted in 1975 for the Colombian National Museum.

Later he travelled to Ecuador and became the government architect under the presidency of Gabriel García Moreno. In this work he built the house of García Moreno, the Prison García Moreno and some bridges. He also planned the reconstruction of the town of Babahoyo, destroyed by several fires.

He died in Guayaquil in 1878.

== Books ==
- Saldarriaga Roa, Alberto; Ortíz Crespo, Alfonso; Pinzón Rivera, José (2005). En busca de Thomas Reed: arquitectura y política del siglo XIX. Bogotá: Panamericana Formas e Impresos.
- Hernández Sánchez-Barba, Mario (1989). Reformismo y progreso en América (1840–1905). Madrid: Ediciones Rialp.
