= Teresita Gómez =

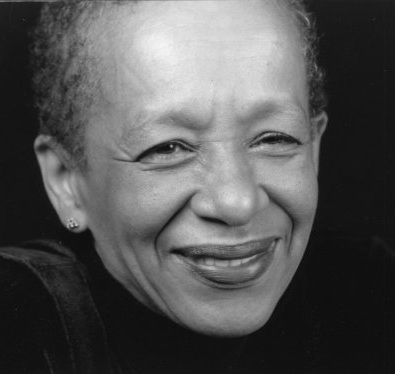

Background information
- Born: María Teresa Gómez Arteaga; May 9, 1943 (age 83); Medellín, Colombia
- Genres: Classical, Salsa
- Occupations: Pianist, teacher
- Instrument: Piano

María Teresa Gómez Arteaga, also known as Teresa Gómez and Teresita Gómez, is a Colombian pianist and music educator.

== Early life and education ==
Teresita Gómez was born on 9 May 1943 in Medellín, Colombia. Her biological mother left her as a baby for Hospital Universitario San Vicente de Paul workers to care of. Before her first birthday, she was adopted by white janitors at the Medellín Palacio de Bellas Artes, Valerio Gómez and Teresa Artega. At the age of three, a teacher at the institute let her watch young white students receive piano lessons at a distance, and Gómez carefully watched their movements. She would then accompany her father while he performed his nightly rounds to play on the classroom pianos. One night, while playing a lullaby on a piano, the piano instructor María Teresa del Castillo walked in and declared, "The Black girl is playing piano!" She began her piano training at the age of 4 with the teachers Marta Agudelo de Maya and Anna María Penella in the Institute of Fine Arts of Medellín, where she gave her first solo concert when she was only 10 years old.

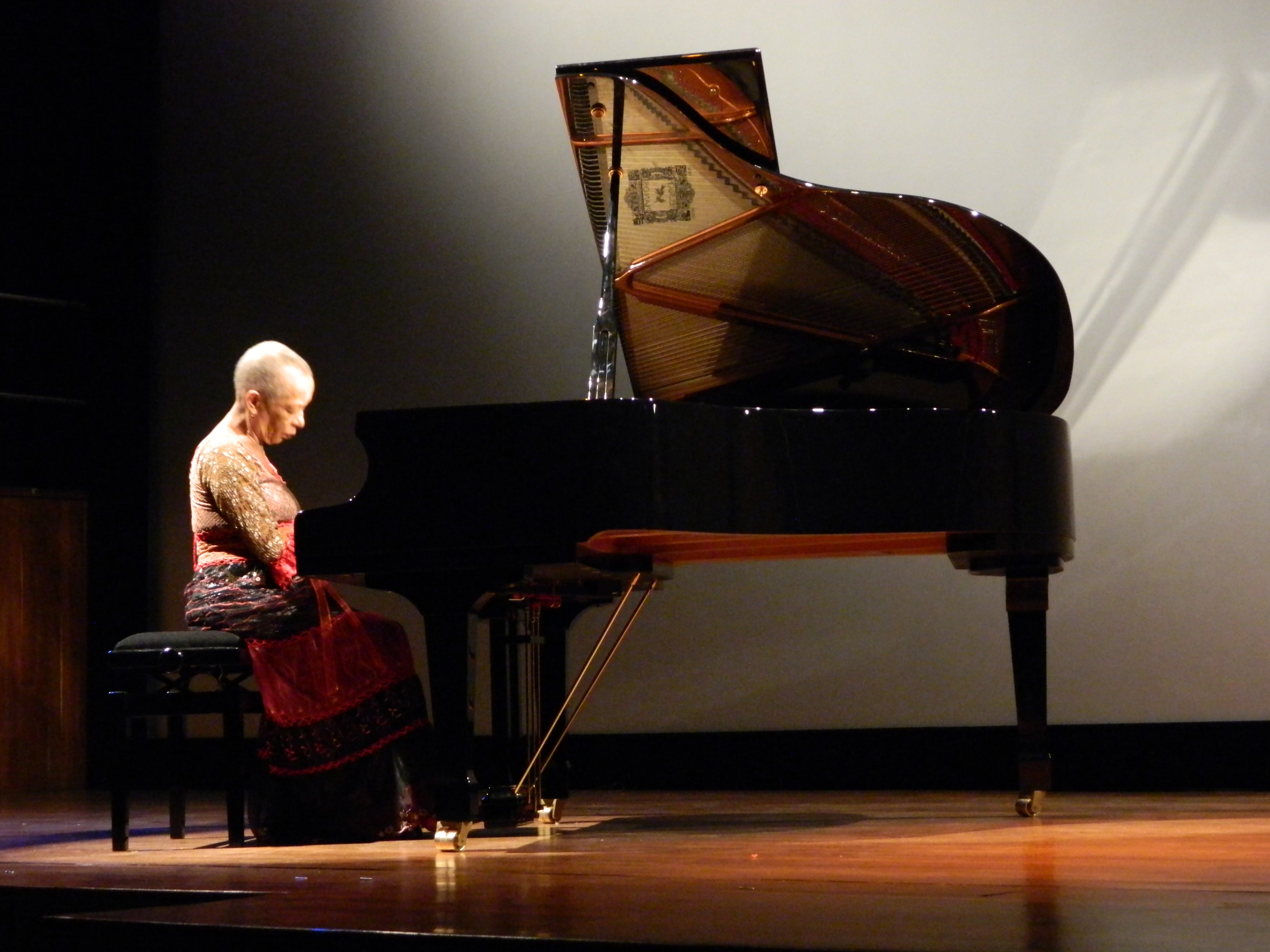
Teresita Gómez in Medellín in 2013

Teresita studied piano at the National University of Colombia with the Russian pianist Tatiana Goncharova and the German pianist Hilde Adler between 1959 and 1962. Later on she was a student of the Colombian-Dutch pianist Harold Martina at the University of Antioquia between 1964 and 1966, where she graduated summa cum laude as Concertmaster and Piano Teacher.

Among her mentors are Barbara Hesse (Varsovia, 1985), Jakob Lateiner (Weimar 1986) and Klaus Bässler (Berlin, 1986–87).

== Awards ==
In 2005, the government of Colombia granted Gómez her the Cross of the Cross of Boyacá at the grade of Commander for her artistic career, contribution to musical culture, and honorable representation of Colombia abroad.

In 2017, the Governor of Antioquia awarded Gómez the golden Juan del Corral, for her musical contributions over 60 years as a professional pianist.

== Festivals and venues ==
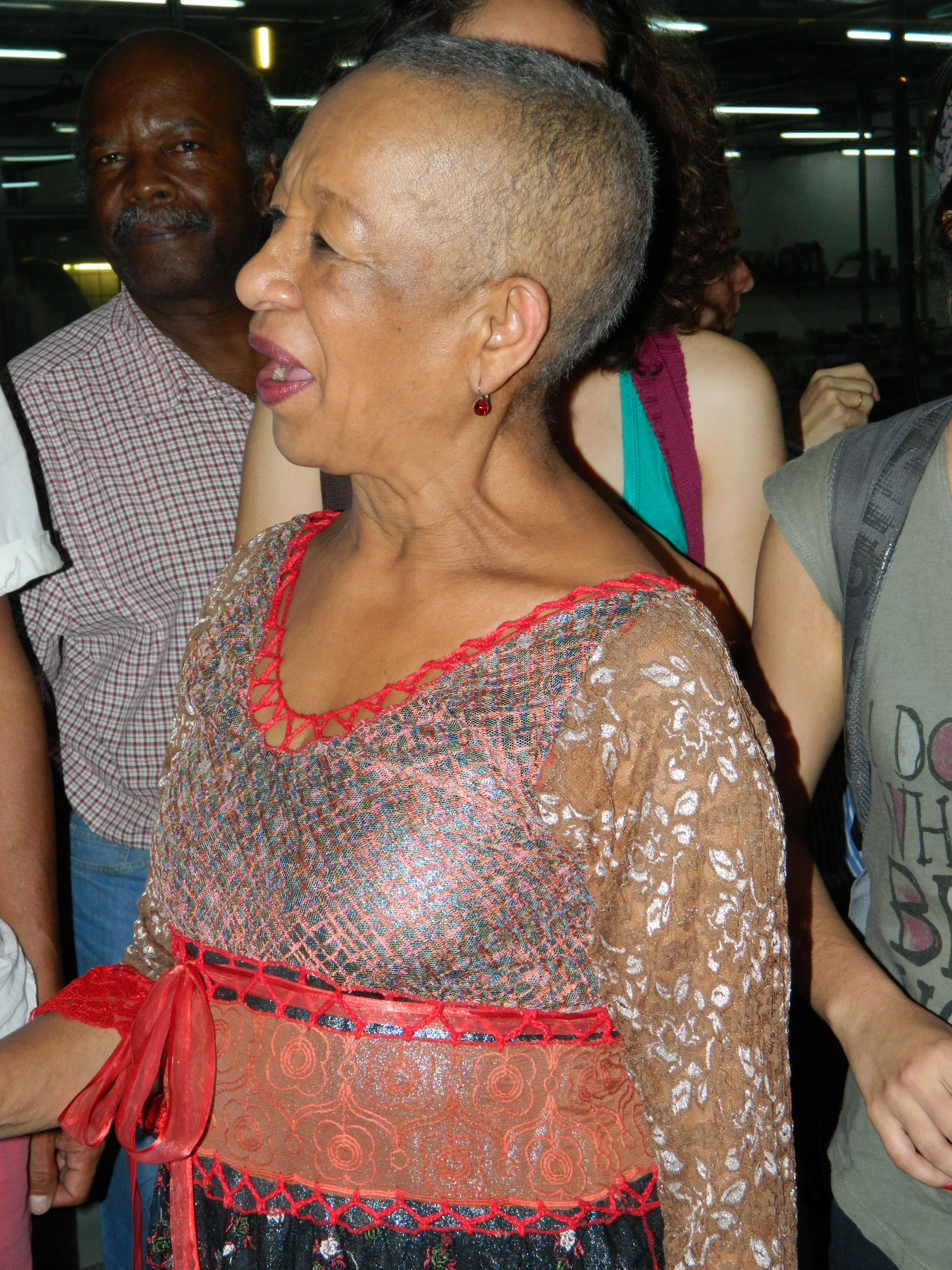
Teresita Gómez in 2013.

- Quinteto de Bogotá
- Frank Preuss Trio
- Conjunto Colombiano de Música Contemporánea
- Medellín Opera
- Colombian Opera
- Bogotá and Medellín Bach Festivals
- Festival de Música Religiosa de Popayán
- Jeleniej Górze Symphonic Orchestra (Poland)
- Professor at Instituto de Bellas Artes de Medellín, Universidad de Antioquia, Universidad de Caldas, Universidad del Cauca and Los Andes University
- Cultural Attaché at the Colombian Embassy in (Germany) (1983–87)

== Discography ==
- Teresa Gómez a Colombia (1983, RTI/Discos Orbe)
- Para Recordar Compositores Colombianos (2000, Discos Fuentes/Universidad de Antioquia)
- Intimo (2006, Alcaldía de Medellín/Universidad de Antioquia)
- Antología I (2007, ColMusica)
