= Colombian presidential sash =

Sash of the Colombian President

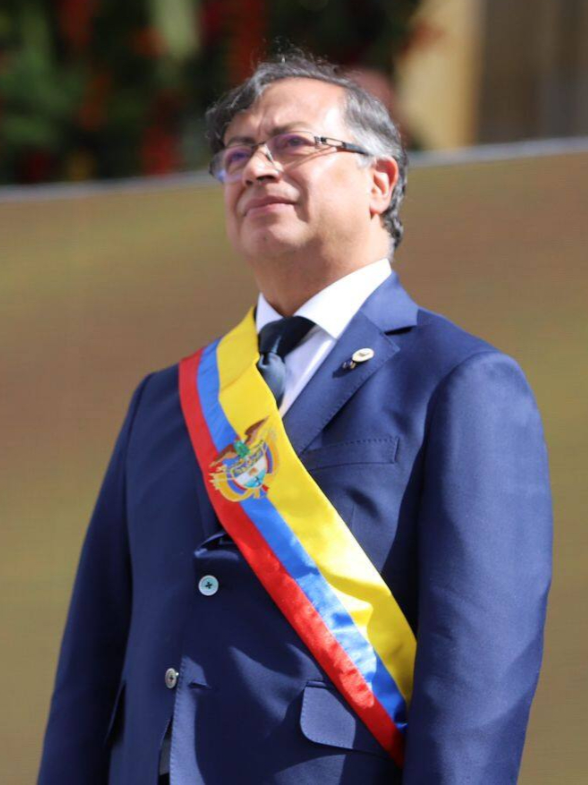
President Gustavo Petro with the Presidential sash

The Colombian presidential sash (Presidential Sash) is the official sash of the President of Colombia.

Presidents of Colombia have used a presidential sash as a distinctive ornament since the 18th century, when President Rafael Núñez first used it for his second term as president of the then United States of Colombia. With the birth of Colombia and the 1886 Constitution, the presidential sash was designed based on the flag. The design was eventually altered to be designed at the discretion of each president. In 1950, for his inauguration, President Laureano Gómez used a sash with the war coat of arms and the year his term began. The use of the presidential sash is regulated in section 4 of article 192, which specifies its proportions.

The president retains the presidential sash presented to him during the inauguration, so a new sash is made for the next inauguration.
