= Plaza de Bolívar =

Main square of Bogotá, Colombia

Bolívar Square
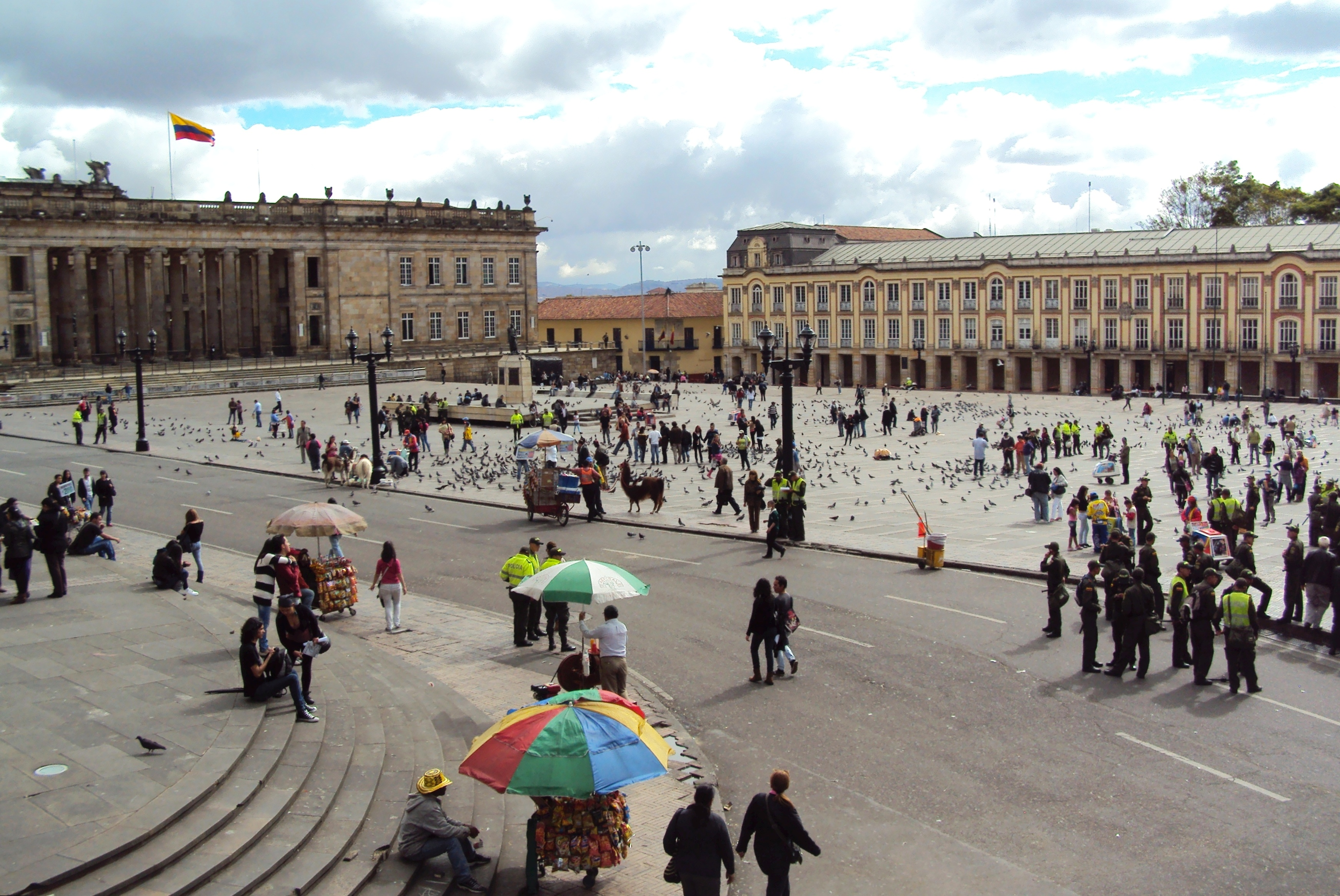
- View of Bolívar Square

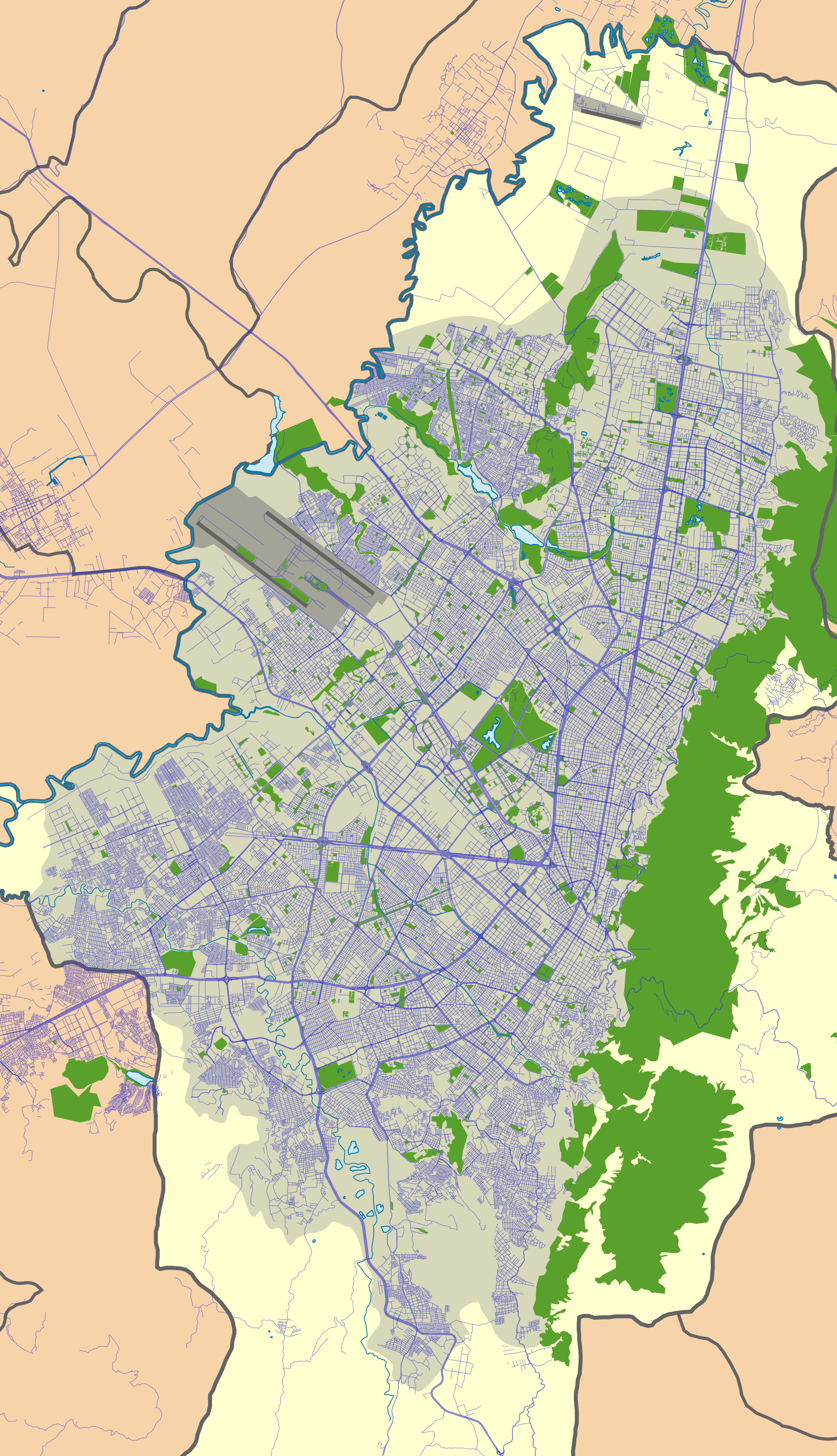
- Location within Bogotá
- Native name: Plaza Bolívar (Spanish)
- Former names: Plaza Mayor (1539–1821); Plaza de la Constitución (1821–1846)
- Namesake: Simón Bolívar
- Area: 1.3903 ha (3.436 acres)
- Location: La Candelaria, Bogotá; Colombia
- Coordinates: 4°35′53″N 74°4′34″W
- North: Calle 11
- East: Carrera 7
- South: Calle 10
- West: Carrera 8

Construction
- Construction start: 27 April 1539
- Inauguration: 20 July 1846

Other
- Status: National monument (19 October 1995)

The Bolívar Square (Spanish: Plaza de Bolívar or Plaza Bolívar) is the main square of the Colombian capital Bogotá. The square, previously called Plaza Mayor until 1821 and Plaza de la Constitución, is located in the heart of the historical area of the city and hosts a statue of Simón Bolívar, sculpted in 1846 by the Italian Pietro Tenerani, which was the first public monument in the city.

The history of Bolívar Square dates back to the pre-Columbian era, when the site was part of the Muisca Confederation. The first building on the square, a primitive cathedral, was constructed in 1539, a year after the foundation of the Colombian capital. During the Spanish colonial period, Bolívar Square was the stage for circus acts, public markets and bullfights. The square is surrounded by historical buildings; the Palace of Justice is located on the northern edge and the National Capitol borders the square in the south. The Primary Cathedral of Bogotá, next to the Archiepiscopal Palace with the monumental door cast by Ferdinando Marinelli Artistic Foundry and the Liévano Palace, seat of the mayor of Bogotá, are situated on the eastern and western side respectively.

Bolívar Square is a main tourist attraction in La Candelaria of Bogotá and the site for various manifestations and protests.

== Description ==
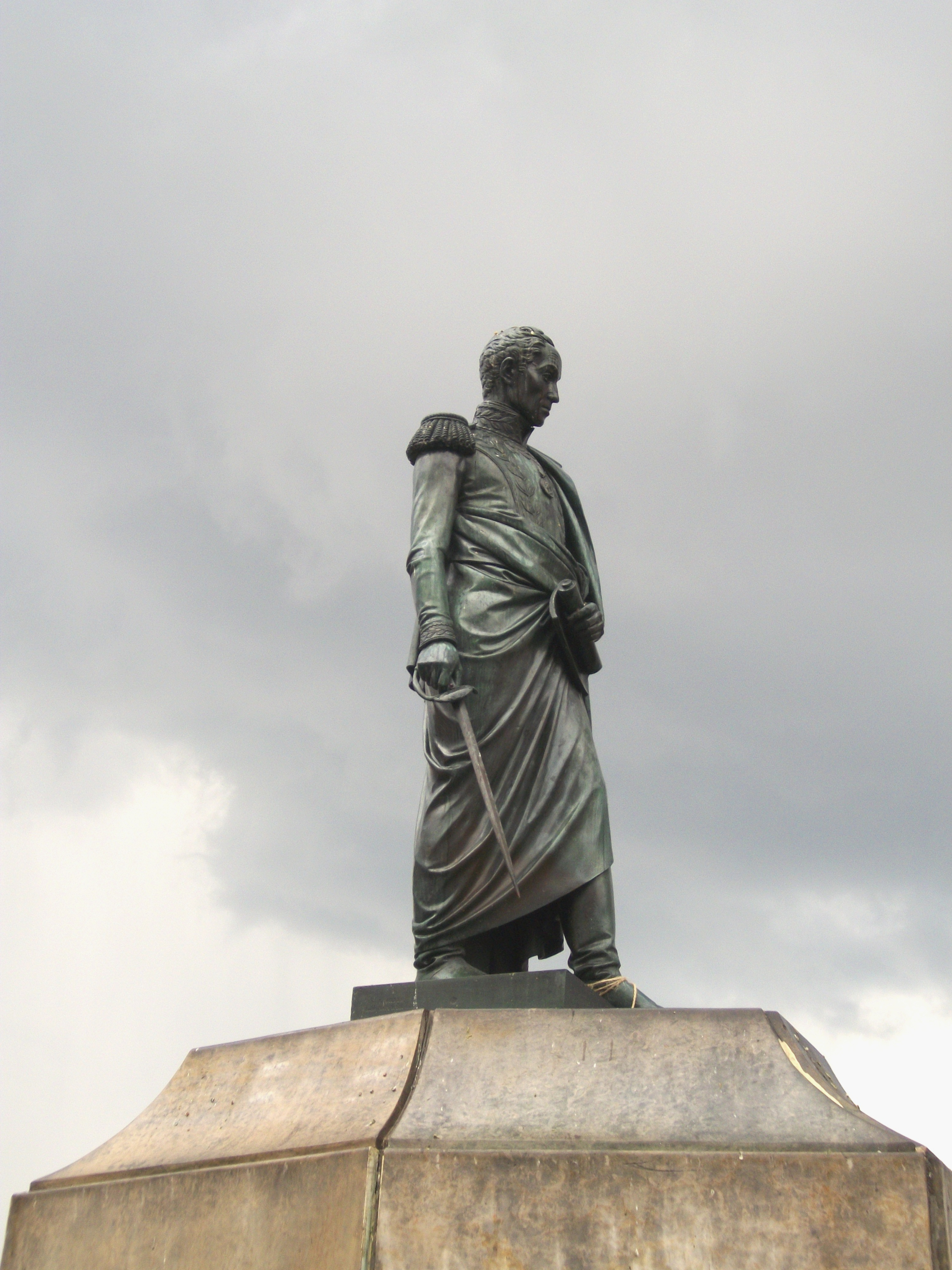
Statue of Simón Bolívar on the square

Bolívar Square is bordered by the streets Calle 10 in the south and Calle 11 in the north and Carrera 7 and Carrera 8 in the east and west respectively. The area is approximately 13,903 square metres (149,650 sq ft).

=== Buildings ===
| Edge | Building | Function | Constructed | Image |
|---|---|---|---|---|
| North | Palace of Justice | Seat of the Judiciary of Colombia | 1998 | |
| West | Liévano Palace | City Hall of Bogotá | 1902–1905 | |
| South | National Capitol | Seat of the Colombian Congress | 1846–1926 | |
| East | Primary Cathedral of Bogotá | Seat of the Archbishop of Bogotá and Primate of Colombia | completed in 1823 | |

== History ==
=== Pre-Columbian history ===
Animation of Sué rising at the solstices and equinoxes above the Eastern Hills, as seen from Bolívar Square

The history of Bolívar Square goes back to pre-Columbian times, when the area was inhabited by the Muisca. The indigenous Muisca, one of the four grand civilisations in the Americas, (together with the Inca, Aztec, Mayan, and Olmec civilizations) had an advanced knowledge of the solar and lunar cycles, represented in their complex lunisolar Muisca calendar. At various locations throughout their Muisca Confederation, the people constructed temples honouring their main deities; Sué, the Sun, and his consort Chía, the Moon.

Studies published about the Muisca astronomy in 2011 and 2017 by Julio Bonilla Romero, revealed that the Sun seen from the northeastern corner of Bolívar Square, at the June solstice rises exactly above Monserrate and at the December solstice above Guadalupe Hill. At the equinoxes of March and September, Sué rises from the valley between these two landmarks in the Eastern Hills of the city.

=== Colonial history ===
Conquistador Gonzalo Jiménez de Quesada, after defeating the last zipa of the southern Muisca Tisquesusa in 1537, founded the city of Bogotá on 6 August 1538. Two other main expeditions reached the newly founded capital of the New Kingdom of Granada in 1539; led by Nikolaus Federmann from the east and Sebastián de Belalcázar from the south. The Spanish conquistadors established the first cathedral of the city on the northeastern corner of the Plaza Mayor.

From the city's founding, the square was the site of a pillory, "La Picota," where public punishments were conducted for nearly a half-century. It was replaced by a public water source in 1583.

During the early colonial period, the Plaza Mayor was a market square, where circus acts, civil, religious and cultural events, and until 1681 bullfights were held. In the same year, a fountain was built on the square. The first buildings were the primitive cathedral on the eastern side, followed by a three-story building constructed in 1545, two-story buildings on the northern and western edges for the principal merchants of the city in 1570, and between 1578 and 1582 the Real Audiencia building in the southwestern corner was built. In the southeastern corner of the square, the Mayor School of San Bartolomé, a secondary school institution, originally a university, was established by the Jesuits in 1604. The Holy Chapel was built at the end of the 17th century and the Viceroyalty Palace on the southeastern corner started construction in 1719 and was inaugurated in 1724. The Palace was completely burned down in 1776.

The present-day Primary Cathedral on the eastern side dates from the early 19th century; construction was started in 1807 by Domingo de Petres and finished in 1823.

=== Republican period ===
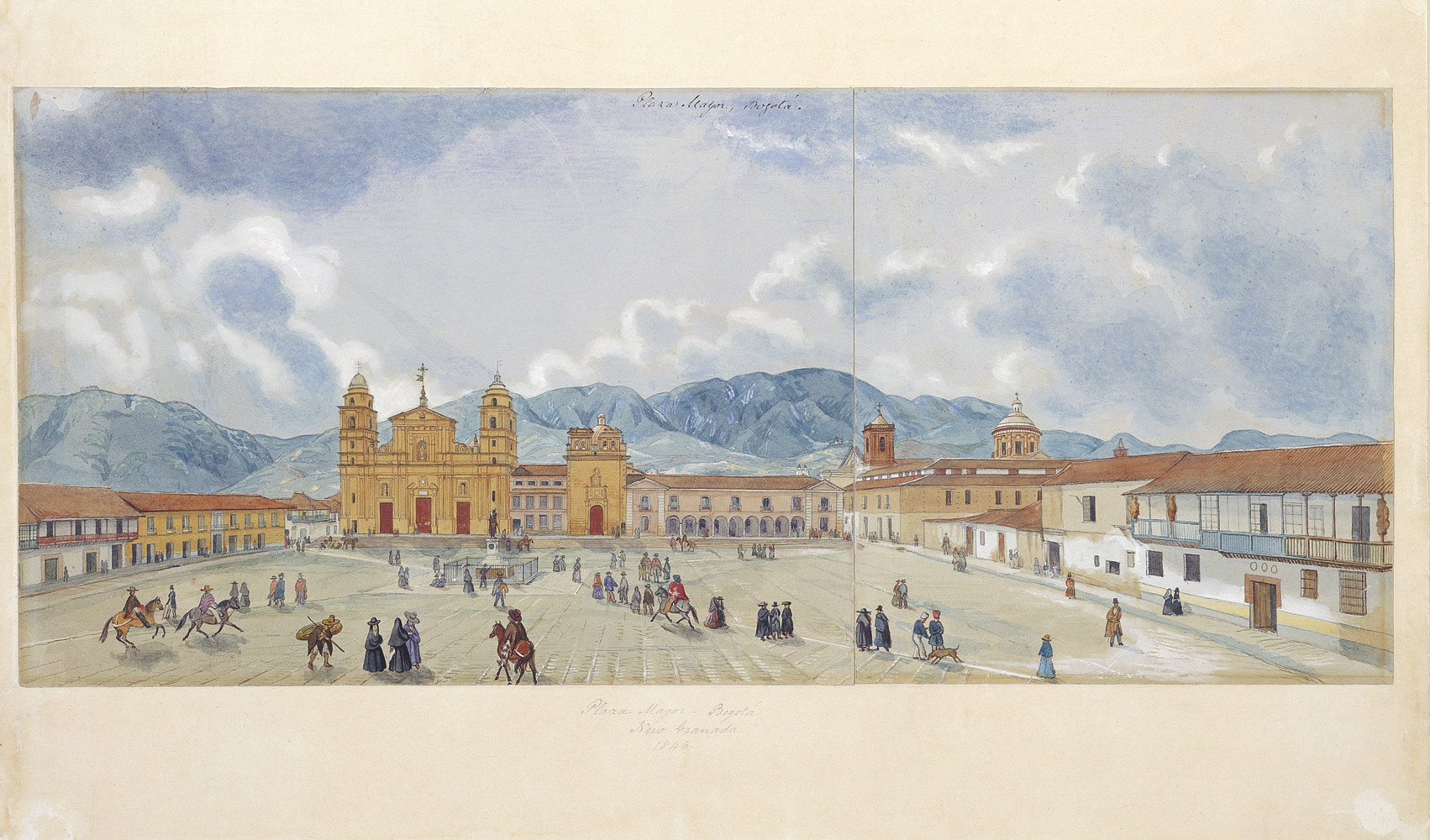
Bolívar Square in 1846

In the Vase House on the northeastern corner, now also known as the Museum of the 20th July, occurred the Call for Independence on 20 July 1810, the first independence attempt from the Spanish rule in Colombia. Camilo Torres Tenorio was executed on the square in 1816. The Bolívar Square was called Plaza de la Constitución (Constitution Square) from 1821 onwards, until the placement of the statue honouring Simon Bolívar in 1846. The National Capitol on the southern side, the seat of the Colombian Congress, was initiated in 1846 but due to the political instability of the country it was not finished until 1926. The French-style building located on the western side of the square known as the Liévano Palace, was constructed between 1902 and 1905. As of 1974 it is the seat for the Mayor of Bogotá.

=== Modern history ===
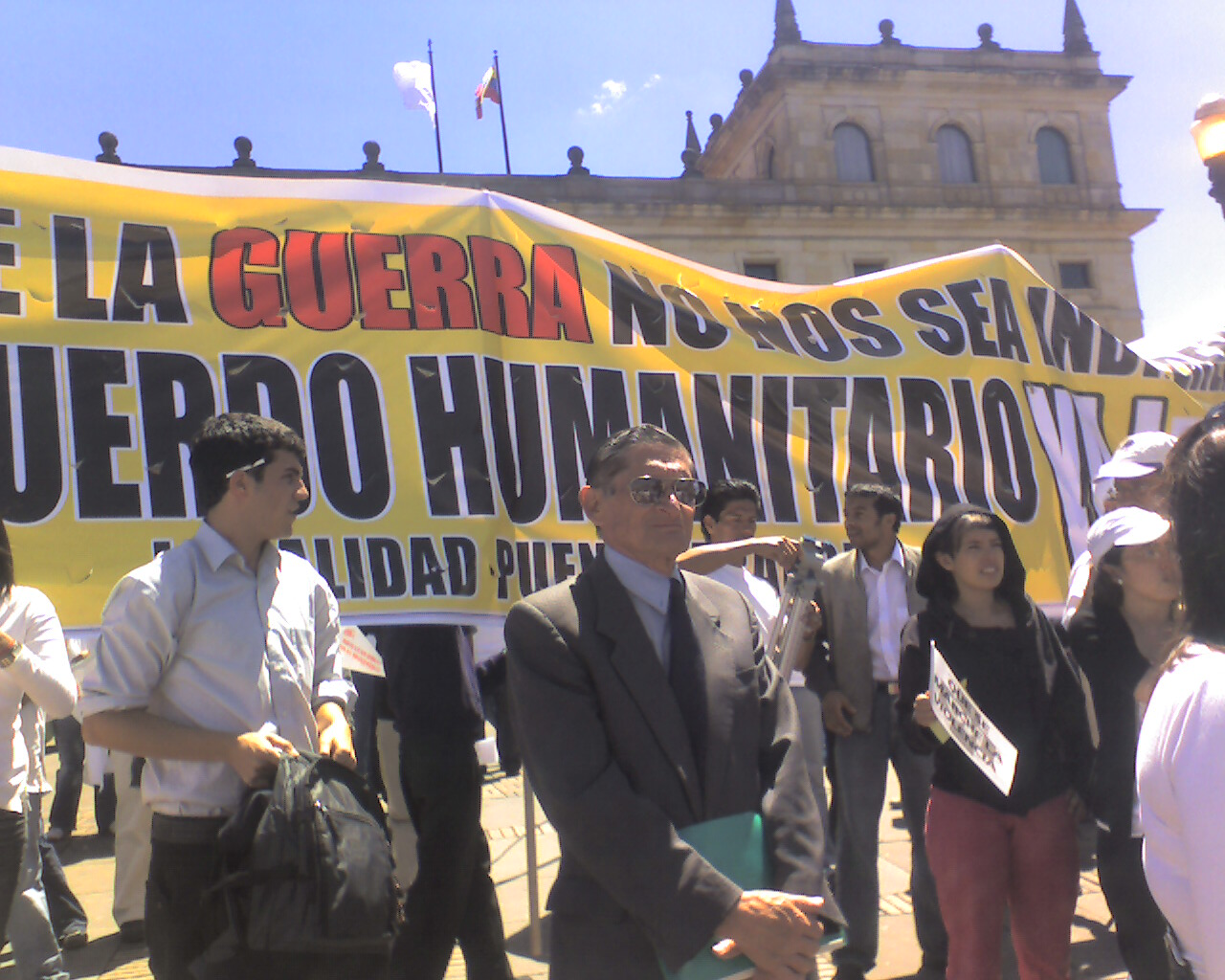
Protests on Bolívar Square, 2008

The Palace of Justice, a large international style building where the Supreme Court is housed, was first built in 1921 but was destroyed by a fire during the Bogotazo after the murder of Jorge Eliécer Gaitán in April 1948. A new palace was built on the north side of the Bolívar Square, but was destroyed again in November 1985 during the "Palace of Justice Siege", by both the guerrilla movement M-19 and the Colombian Army. The ruins of the building were kept untouched until 1989, when the government decided to construct a third (and current) building on the location, of which construction started in 1998.

Bolívar Square was proposed as a national monument on 26 October 1994 and received that status on 19 October 1995.

Bolívar Square has a long history as site for various protests. In July 1947, more than 100,000 people protested during the night. During a protest in 2016, students camped on the square.

== Panoramas ==
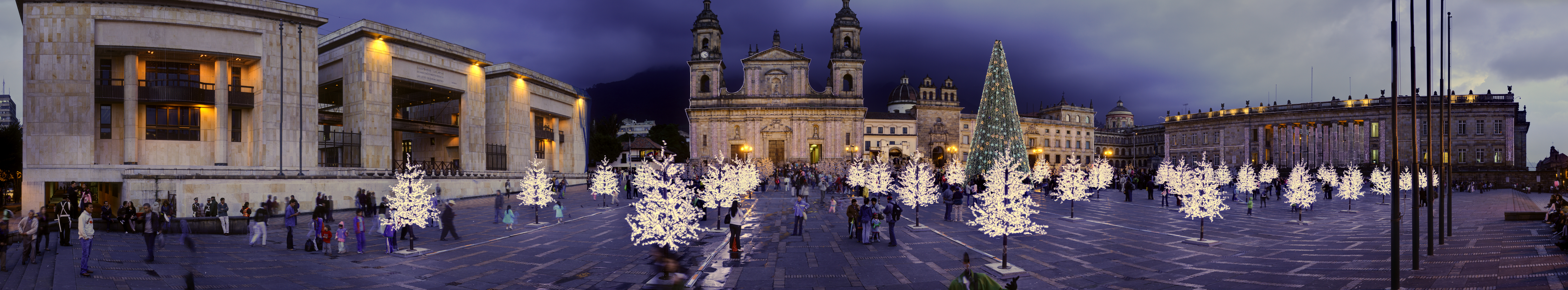
Christmas decorations at Bolívar Square
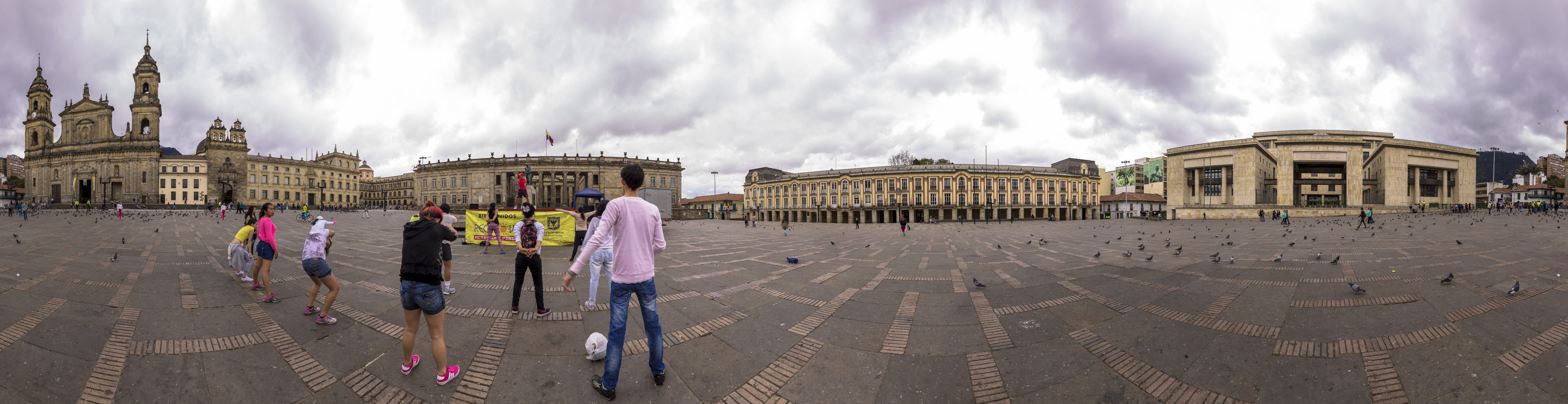
Bolívar Square in 2016

== See also ==
- Primary Cathedral of Bogota
