= Palacio de San Carlos, Bogotá =

16th-century Neoclassical mansion in Bogotá, Colombia

San Carlos Palace
- Palacio de San Carlos
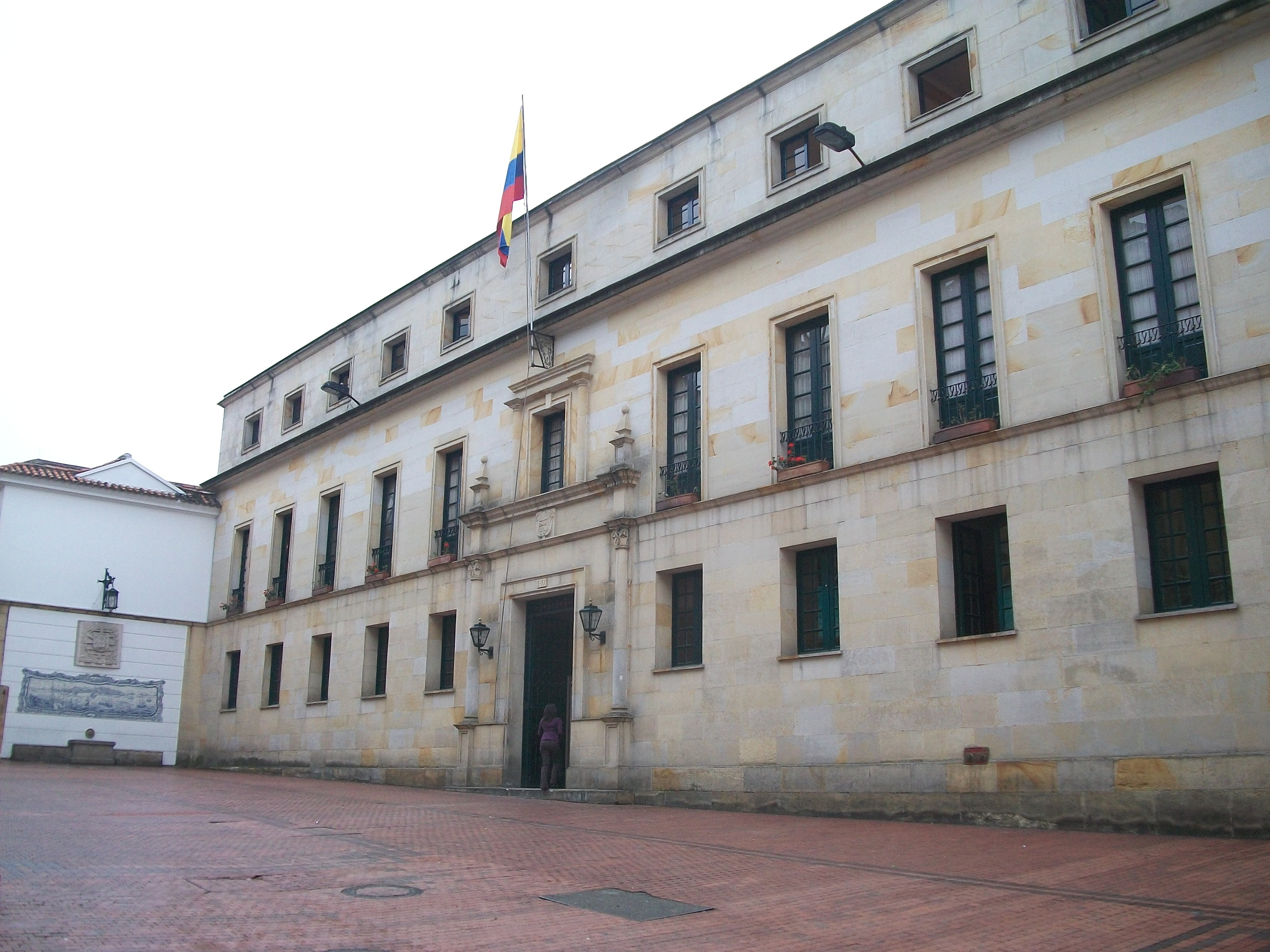
- Interactive map of the San Carlos Palace area
- Former names: Colegio Seminario de San Bartolomé

General information
- Architectural style: Neoclassical
- Location: Calle 10 № 5-51, Bogotá, D.C., Colombia
- Coordinates: 04°35′47.20″N 074°04′28.43″W
- Current tenants: Ministry of Foreign Affairs
- Completed: c. 1580
- Owner: Government of Colombia

Technical details
- Floor count: 3

The San Carlos Palace (Spanish: Palacio de San Carlos; previously Colegio Seminario de San Bartolomé), is a 16th-century Neoclassical mansion in Bogotá, Colombia. Located on the corner of Calle 10 and Carrera 5, the historic building has been the site of various political, social and academic events. Since December 1993, it has been home to the Ministry of Foreign Affairs.

== History ==
The history of the building goes back to the end of the 16th century when it was built by Archdeacon Francisco Porras Mejia, in 1585. At the time Santa Fe de Bogotá was the capital of New Kingdom of Granada, part of the Viceroyalty of Peru. It was occupied by the archdeacon's family until 1605 when it was sold to Archbishop Bartolomé Lobo Guerrero who used it as a Jesuit seminary known as the Colegio Seminario de San Bartolomé. In 1739, the first printing press of Santa Fe was also established here. In 1767, after the Jesuits were expelled from New Granada by Francisco Antonio Moreno y Escandón, acting on orders from King Carlos III, it became the Royal Library of Santa Fe and served as barracks for the Presidential Guard. From 1827 to 1908 the palace was the official residence of the President of Colombia. Then President Rafael Reyes Prieto moved out to the Palace of Nariño where he lived until 1954. From 1954 it again became the residence of General Gustavo Rojas Pinilla and his successors until 1980. In 1980 after the Palace of Nariño was inaugurated as the presidential residence, the Palace of San Carlos was converted to house the Ministry of Foreign Affairs which it still accommodates today.

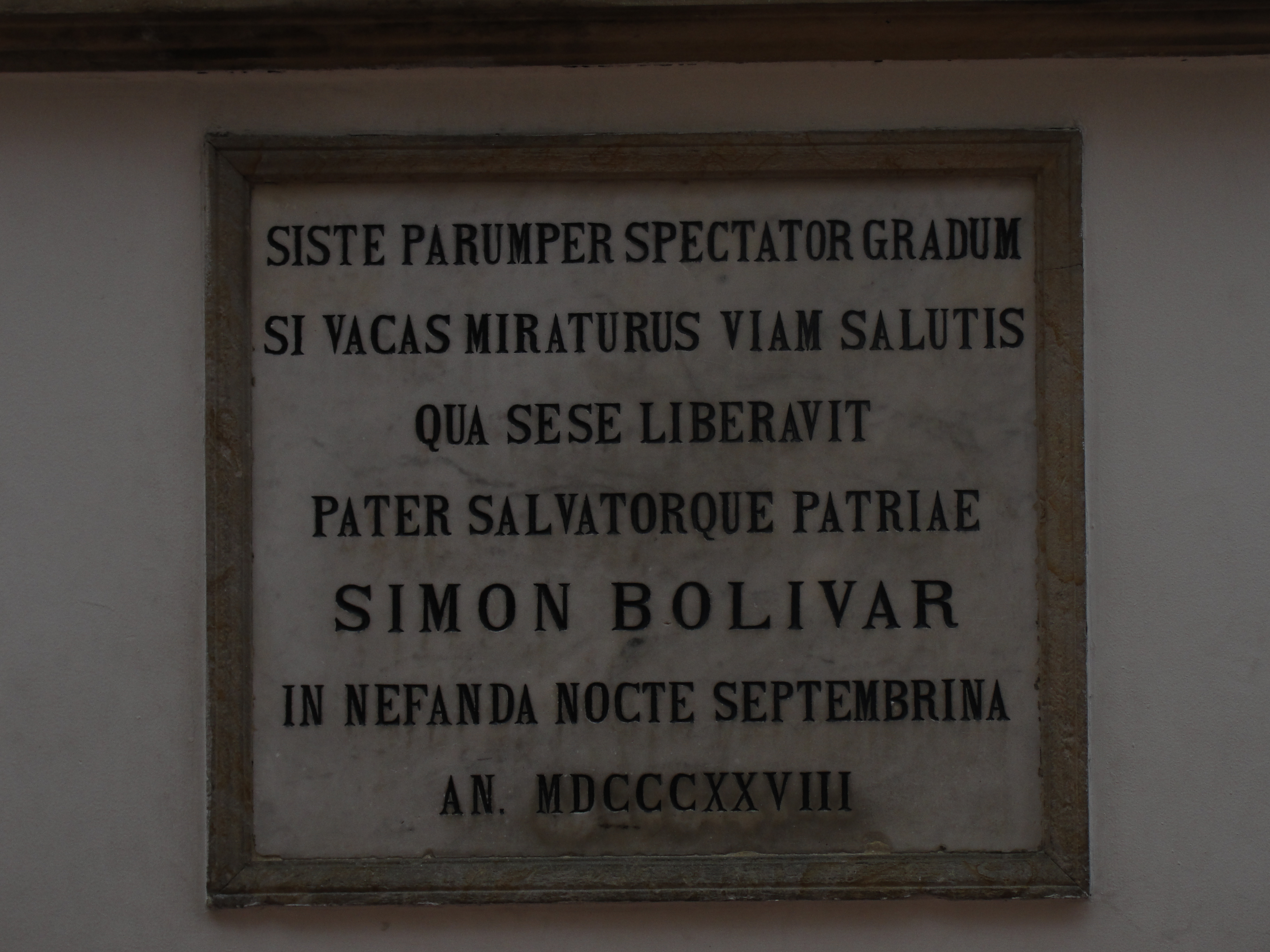
Wall plaque commemorating the assassination attempt on Simon Bolivar

The palace was also the scene of an assassination attempt on Simon Bolivar in 1828. He was attacked when a group of conspirators attempted to assassinate him while he was taking a bath and he escaped through the window with soap still covering his body. His mistress, Manuela Sáenz Aizpuru, who tipped him off and saved him came to be known among Bogotans as "the liberator of the liberator". The event became known as the Noche Septembrina (English: September's Night), and it is referenced in Latin in a plaque conspicuously fixed on the wall next to the window through which he escaped. In 1937, properties next to the palace were acquired on the eastern side. The main entrance was added along with a triple storied building to accommodate the offices of the Ministry. Built by the Italian architect Pietro Cantini, the new façade stands close to two other historic buildings on Calle del Coliseo (Calle 10): the birthplace of the poet Rafael Pombo and the Christopher Columbus Theatre. On 11 August 1975, the San Carlos Palace was declared a National Monument.

In July 2026, president-elect Abelardo de la Espriella announced that he would move the presidential office back to the San Carlos Palace and turn the Casa de Nariño into a museum, but reversed course the following month after he had taken office, with authorities citing security concerns.

== Architecture ==
The Palace is built around a central courtyard with Tuscan columns and slightly pointed arches. On the south side of the courtyard there is a stairway up to the first floor. The original stone entrance with a balcony and iron railings is preserved as part of the façade. There are two rows of rectangular windows including the one on the east side through which Bolívar escaped on 25 September 1828. From 1937 to 1942, the building was adapted for future use by the architects Hernando González Varona and Manuel de Vengoechea.

On 9 April 1948, the palace was attacked during the Bogotazo which caused damage to its interiors.

== Interior and furnishings ==
The building has been completely restored to serve as a heritage site and as a venue for diplomatic receptions and special events. It is known for its elegant state rooms. In its patios, there is a walnut planted by Bolívar and a palm which President José Hilario López Valdés planted to commemorate the birth of his daughter Policarpa.

The large entrance hall displays six 18th-century Spanish chairs in the Cordoba style and a central table. Two large 19th-century bronze vases flank the stairway at the far end. Bolivar's bedroom is furnished with a 17th-century bed and a bargueño desk with secret drawers. The neighbouring oratory with works from the Santa Fe school and an altar in the colonial style with two florally decorated candelabras. Since colonial times, the Bolívar Room opposite the bedroom has been a venue for important official ceremonies. It houses a portrait of Bolívar by the Venezuelan artist Antonio Salguero Salas and a fireplace with two Solomonic columns.

The ceiling in the entrance to the state rooms is decorated with a Pompeian fresco by Santiago Martínez Delgado (1950). The large Audience Hall features a carpet with a hunting scene and carved wooden chairs with a gold-leaf finish. The Cabinet Room accommodates a flag of the United States of Colombia from 1863.

The Francisco de Paula Santander Room which is traditionally used as a reception hall for formal events. Its gold-toned walls bear damasks from Italy. A giant rococo mirror complements the two colonial tables. There is a painting of the Virgin and Child from the Cuzco School and a 19th-century portrait of José Joaquín de Olmedo, Minister of Foreign Affairs of Colombia, and later President of Ecuador, by A. Castillanos. The 18th-century furniture is from Spain.
