= Puente de Boyacá =

Monument west of Tunja, Colombia

Coordinates: 5°27′02″N 73°25′49″W

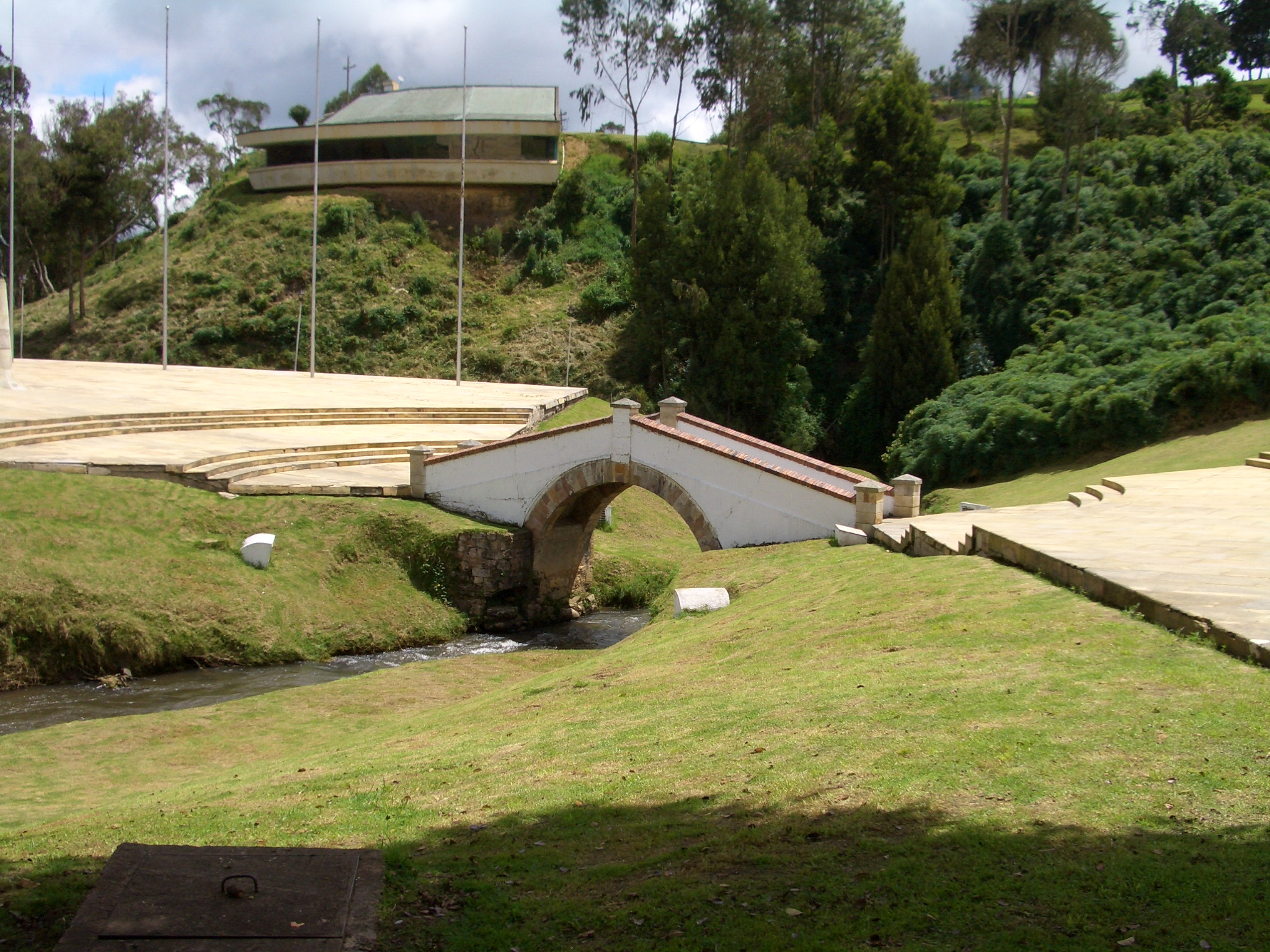
The Boyacá Bridge

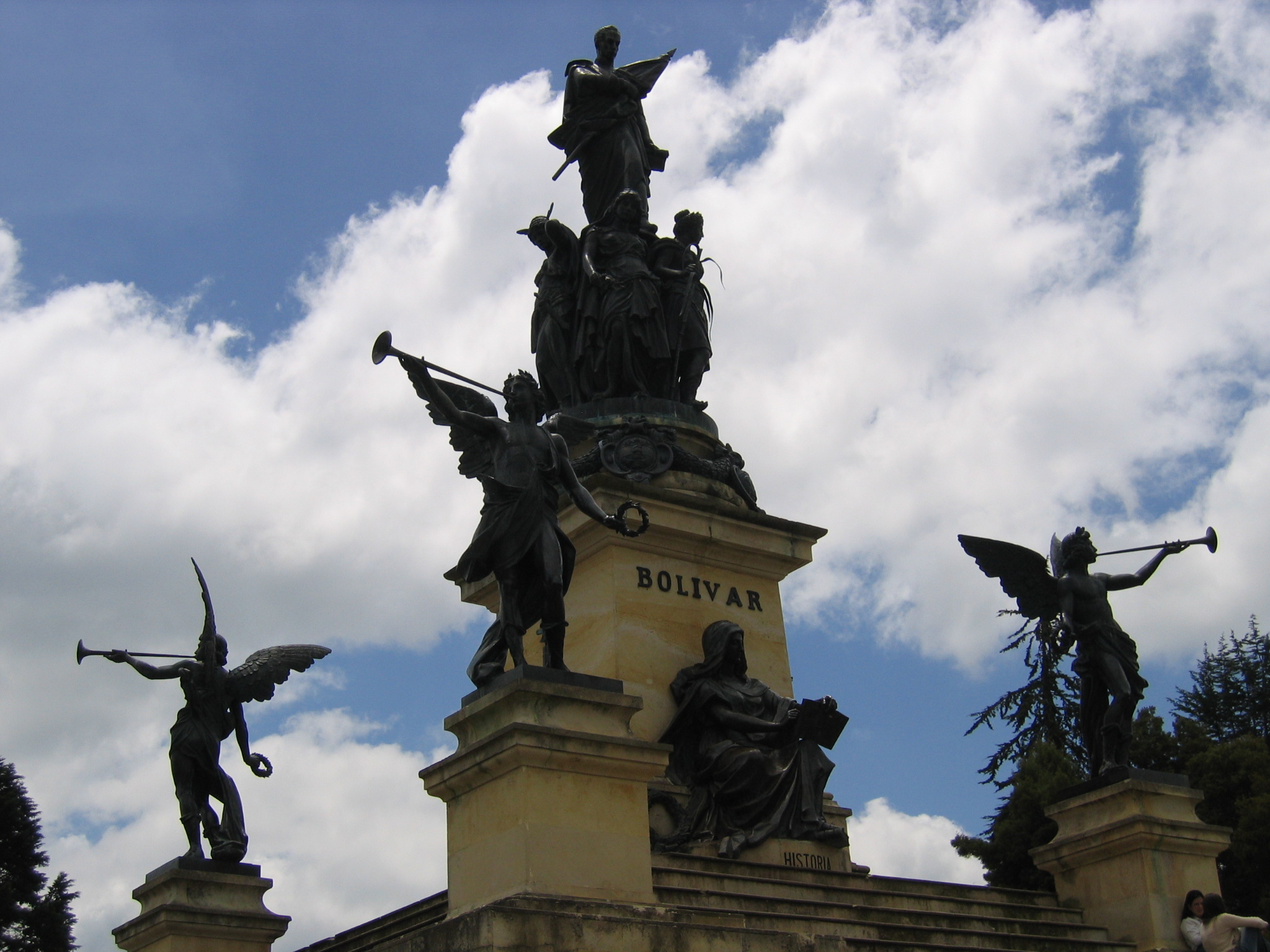
Von Miller Monument

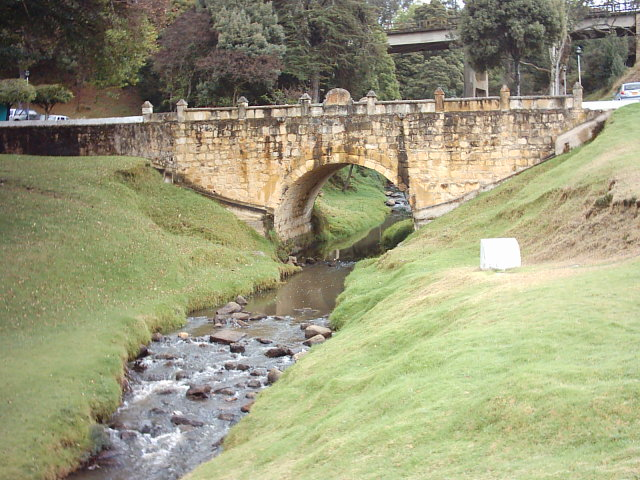
Teatinos River

The Puente de Boyacá (in English: Bridge of Boyacá) is a bridge located 110 km east of Bogotá and 14 km west from Tunja in a valley, crossing the Teatinos River near the Pan-American Highway. It was the site of the historic battle of August 7, 1819, known as the Battle of Boyacá, which granted independence to New Granada.

== History ==
The bridge was built in the early 18th century over the Teatinos River.

=== Battle of Boyacá ===
During the Colombian War of Independence, General Simon Bolivar led a campaign to liberate New Granada from the Spanish reconquest. In 1819, both revolutionary and royalist forces were racing towards Santa Fe, the capital, which was only defended by 400 Spanish troops.

On the day of the battle, the III Division of the Spanish Expeditionary Army of Costa Firme, commanded by Spanish Colonel José Barreiro, set out on one of the last legs of their journey towards Santa Fe, which involved crossing the Teatinos River over the bridge. Bolivar's troops, commanded by General Francisco de Paula Santander were close, however, and were able to intercept the royalist forces.

The Spanish advance force had crossed the bridge by the time the revolutionaries had caught up with them, which resulted in a battle of the vanguards over the bridge while the main forces engaged nearby. Following a crossing of the bridge to attack the Spanish, the result of the battle was a decisive victory for Santander; 1800 Spanish prisoners along with the Spanish commander were captured.

Within days, Viceroy Juan de Samano was informed of Barreiro's defeat and prepared a hasty escape from Santa Fe, enabling Bolivar's forces to take the capital with no resistance. This marked a major milestone in independence from Spain.

=== Post-independence ===
The bridge was dedicated a National Monument and Memorial of Independence in 1920.

In 1939, the bridge was rebuilt in stone to commemorate the anniversary of the founding of Tunja.

== Commemorative monuments ==
Near the bridge are located the following secondary monuments:

- The Von Miller Monument (for German sculptor Ferdinand Freiherr von Miller), depicting five allegoric female figures symbolic of the Bolivarian countries, Colombia, Venezuela, Peru, Ecuador, and Bolivia, surrounding Simón Bolívar.
- The Francisco de Paula Santander statue.
- The Triumphal Arch, depicting the three main races (Caucasian, African and Native American) that combined into the Colombian ethnic mix.
- The Flags Square, with the Liberty Fire; a perpetual gas-ignited flame.
- The Chapel, with four daily masses.
