= Daylight saving time in Colombia =

Rolling blackouts in 1992-3

From February 1992 until March 1993, Colombia suffered rolling blackouts of up to 10 hours a day due to a particularly strong El Niño season, which dried the reservoirs in hydroelectric plants in a country deriving 70% of its energy output from hydroelectric sources; consequently, the government decided to use DST to help save electricity. The experiment failed to deliver the intended results, possibly due to Colombia's low latitude, and the DST experiment was discontinued.

== See also ==
- Daylight saving time by country
- 1992 Colombian energy crisis
