= National Capitol of Colombia =

Building which holds both houses of the Congress of Colombia

Coordinates: 4°35′51″N 74°04′35″W

- Capitolio Nacional de Colombia
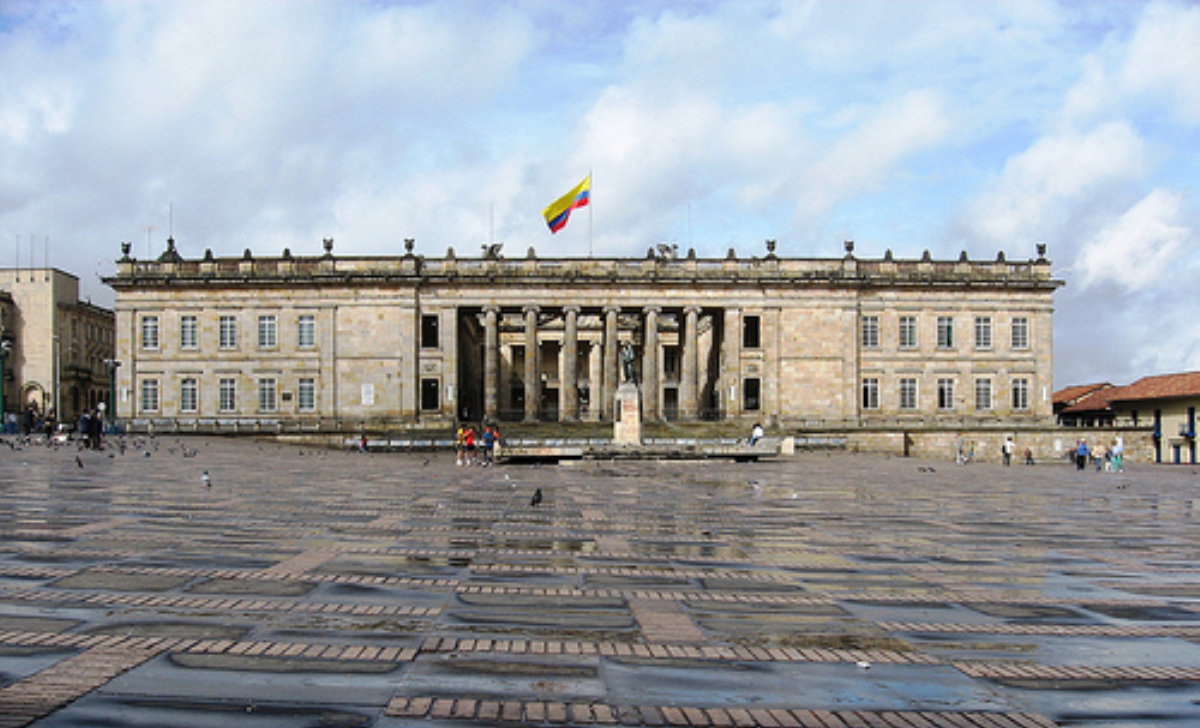
- North side (2016)
- Interactive map of the National Capitol of Colombia area

General information
- Architectural style: Neoclassical
- Location: Bogotá, Colombia
- Construction started: 20 July 1848
- Completed: 7 August 1926; 99 years ago

Design and construction
- Architect: Thomas Reed

The National Capitol of Colombia (Spanish: Capitolio Nacional de Colombia), often simply referred to as Capitolio Nacional (National Capitol), is a building on Plaza de Bolívar in central Bogotá, the construction of which began in 1848 and was finished in 1926. It houses both houses of the Congress of Colombia. It was designed by Thomas Reed.

== Murals ==
In 1938, Ignacio Gómez Jaramillo painted two murals for the Capitolio Nacional in Bogotá.

In 1947, for the Inter American Conference, Santiago Martínez Delgado painted a mural under commission of the then director of the Organization of American States, Alberto Lleras Camargo and Conference organizer Laureano Gómez, two men who later became Presidents of Colombia. This mural of the Elliptic chamber National Congress Building, made in the fresco style, represents Simón Bolivar and Santander exiting the Cucuta congress during the creation of Gran Colombia. The mural is considered the most important fresco in the country and the artist's main masterpiece.

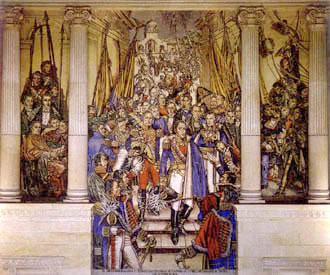
Mural by Santiago Martínez Delgado in the Colombian Congress.
