= Opinion polling for the 2022 Colombian presidential election =

This page lists public opinion polls conducted for the 2022 Colombian presidential election, the first round of which was held on 29 May. Because no candidate won a majority, a second round was held on 19 June between the top two candidates, Gustavo Petro and Rodolfo Hernández Suárez.

== First round ==
=== Graphical summary ===
View source data.

=== Table of values ===
Polling organisation/client	Date(s) conducted	Sample size	Gustavo Petro PHC	Federico Gutiérrez EPC	Rodolfo Hernández LIGA	Sergio Fajardo CCE	Íngrid Betancourt PVO	John M. Rodríguez CJL	Enrique Gómez MSN	Luis Pérez IND	Blank	No vote	Unsure/No answer	Margin of Error
First round election	29 May 2022	–	40.34%	23.94%	28.17%	4.18%	0.07%	1.28%	0.23%	0.05%	1.73%	–	–	–
Betancourt withdrew her candidacy on 20 May 2022
AtlasIntel	17–20 May 2022	2,781	40%	26.7%	21.4%	8.8%	0.2%	–	–	–	–	–	–	2%
CELAG	16–20 May 2022	2,174	45.1%	20.1%	20.4%	4.9%	–	–	–	–	3.6%	1.4%	3.2%	2.1%
Guarumo	16–19 May 2022	2,258	37.9%	30.8%	20.3%	4.3%	0.8%	0.8%	0.5%	–	2.4%	–	2.2%	2.5%
CNC	13–19 May 2022	3,860	41%	23.9%	21.9%	4.5%	0.7%	1.1%	0.3%	–	6.6%	–	–	1.5%
CNC	13–19 May 2022	4,412	35.8%	20.8%	19.1%	4%	0.6%	1%	0.3%	–	5.7%	2.5%	9.9%	1.5%
Invamer	13–18 May 2022	1,312	40.6%	27.1%	20.9%	5.1%	0.8%	0.6%	0.3%	–	4.6%	–	–	2.71%
Mosqueteros	15–18 May 2022	6,000	44.7%	22.4%	15.8%	6.9%	0.6%	0.9%	0.5%	–	7.9%	–	–	1.27%
CNC	2–13 May 2022	6,204	38%	23%	16%	7%	1%	1%	0%	–	6%	2%	6%	1.2%
Pérez withdrew his candidacy on 11 May 2022
TYSE	23 Apr–8 May 2022	8,000	36.6%	21.4%	10.9%	6.6%	0.8%	1.1%	1.3%	1.1%	6.2%	–	14.4%	2.7%
YanHaas	30 Apr–7 May 2022	1,232	40%	21%	12%	7%	1%	–	0.3%	0.3%	13%	–	6%	3.2%
Guarumo	25–29 April 2022	2,132	36.4%	30.6%	12.4%	6.9%	1.3%	1.1%	1.1%	0.2%	5.7%	–	4.3%	2.5%
Invamer	21–27 April 2022	1,409	43.6%	26.7%	13.9%	6.5%	0.5%	1.5%	1.1%	0.5%	5.7%	–	–	2.55%
CNC/Semana	18–21 April 2022	4,599	38%	23.8%	9.6%	7.2%	0.9%	0.9%	0.3%	0.4%	7.6%	2.1%	8.8%	1.4%
CELAG	1–19 April 2022	3,064	42.6%	21.8%	11.5%	9.2%	1.0%	—	—	—	6.6%	1.4%	5.1%	2.19%
CNC	4–7 April 2022	1,965	34%	23%	12%	9%	2%	1%	0%	0%	4%	2%	12%	2.2%
Guarumo	30 Mar–1 Apr 2022	1,865	34%	25%	9.3%	9.5%	2.6%	0.6%	1.6%	0.3%	10.3%	—	7.4%	2.5%
CNC/Semana	28–31 March 2022	4,206	36.5%	24.5%	10%	8.4%	1.5%	0.9%	0.5%	0.3%	8.1%	2.8%	6.2%	1.5%
YanHaas	14–19 March 2022	1,236	37%	19%	11%	10%	2%	—	0.3%	0.2%	16%	—	5%	3.2
CNC/Semana	18–19 March 2022	2,143	32%	23%	10%	10%	3%	—	1%	0%	5%	2%	13%	2.1%

=== Polls prior to the finalisation of candidates ===
==== Graphical summary ====
View source data.

==== 2022 ====
Polling organisation/client	Date conducted	Sample size	Alejandro Char	Alejandro Gaviria Uribe	Alfredo Saade	Arelis Uriana	Aydeé Lizarazo	Camilo Romero	Carlos Amaya	David Barguil	Enrique Peñalosa	Federico Gutiérrez	Francia Márquez	Gustavo Petro	Íngrid Betancourt	John Milton Rodríguez	Jorge Robledo	Juan Fernando Cristo	Juan Manuel Galán	Luis Pérez	Óscar Iván Zuluaga	Rodolfo Hernández	Sergio Fajardo	Others	No vote	Blank	Margin of error
AtlasIntel	10–12 March	2,376	7.0%	1.9%	–	–	–	–	–	–	–	11.4%	–	35.2%	1.5%	1.1%	1.6%	–	4.8%	0.5%	2.4%	11.2%	11.3%	–	2.4%	–	2%
Guarumo	28 Feb–4 Mar	2,345	6.4%	3.4%	0.1%	0.8%	0.3%	0.5%	1.5%	3.5%	1.4%	7.7%	2.5%	32.7%	3.3%	–	1.2%	–	3.4%	–	5.3%	8.2%	9.1%	–	4.8%	1.5%	2.5%
CELAG	14 Jan–4 Feb	2,126	11.3%	3.4%	–	–	–	–	–	–	0.1%	2.2%	–	28.1%	–	1.0%	–	–	2.3%	–	3.2%	4.1%	7.2%	–	11.8%	15.1%	2.19%
CNC	26 Jan–2 Feb	2,206	5%	2%	–	–	–	–	–	1%	2%	4%	–	27%	7%	–	–	–	4%	–	4%	14%	6%	1%	11%	6%	2.1%
YanHaas	25–31 January	1,225	5%	1%	0.1%	0.4%	1%	1%	1%	1%	2%	3%	3%	27%	2%	0.1%	1%	0.1%	3%	1%	4%	12%	7%	–	19%	–	3.2%

==== 2021 ====
Polling organisation/client	Date conducted	Sample size	Alejandro Char	Alejandro Gaviria Uribe	Ángela Robledo	Camilo Romero	David Barguil	Dilian Francisca Toro	Enrique Peñalosa	Federico Gutiérrez	Germán Vargas Lleras	Gustavo Petro	Humberto De la Calle	Jorge Enrique Robledo	Juan Carlos Echeverry	Juan Carlos Pinzón	Juan Manuel Galán	Luis Pérez	María Fernanda Cabal	Marta Lucía Ramírez	Óscar Iván Zuluaga	Paloma Valencia	Rodolfo Hernández	Rodrigo Lara	Roy Barreras	Sergio Fajardo	Simón Gaviria Muñoz	Tomás Uribe	Others	Blank	Margin of error
YanHaas	30 Nov–8 Dec	1,230	5%	1%	–	–	–	2%	–	3%	–	25%	–	–	–	–	5%	–	–	–	4%	–	13%	–	–	8%	–	–	4%	18%	2.8%
CNC/Semana	26 Nov–7 Dec	4,093	4.5%	2.3%	–	–	0.6%	–	2.1%	3.3%	2.2%	25.4%	–	–	0.6%	–	3.9%	–	–	–	6.4%	–	11%	–	–	7.3%	–	–	–	17.4%	1.5%
CNC	9–12 November	1,069	–	5%	–	1%	1%	–	2%	5%	–	22%	3%	1%	1%	–	5%	1%	4%	–	3%	–	6%	–	–	5%	–	–	19%	7%	3%
Datexco	15–26 October	1,200	–	6%	–	–	–	1%	3%	6%	–	26%	–	–	–	–	5%	–	4%	–	3%	–	7%	–	–	10%	–	–	11%	9%	N/A
CNC	8–14 October	2,012	–	2.6%	–	–	1.3%	–	1.2%	3%	–	19.7%	1.8%	–	–	4.2%	–	3.2%	–	–	1.8%	–	4.6%	0.9%	0.6%	5.8%	–	–	–	22.5%	N/A
CNC	3–8 September	2,019	–	3%	–	–	–	–	1%	4%	–	17%	–	–	–	–	6%	–	4%	–	3%	–	5%	–	–	7%	–	–	–	23%	2.4%
Guarumo	14–16 August	1,367	4.2%	–	–	1.2%	–	–	–	8.9%	–	21.6%	1.6%	1.2%	–	–	6.0%	–	1.4%	–	3.8%	–	3.3%		–	12.7%	–	–	7.1%	10.8%	2.5%
CNC	17–22 June	2,077	3%	2%	–	–	–	–	4%	3%	2%	21%	–	–	–	–	5%	–	–	–	–	–	–	–	–	6%	–	–	–	26%	2.4%
CELAG	13 May–8 June	1,945	4.3%	–	–	–	–	–	–	4.9%	5.2%	30.3%	6.2%	–	–	–	7.3%	–	–	–	–	–	–	–	–	14.7%	–	3.3%	4.2%	14.3%	N/A
Guarumo	19–23 May	1,480	4.8%	–	–	–	–	–	–	8.5%	–	20.6%	2.3%	2%	–	2.8%	3%	–	–	–	–	–	–	–	–	9.8%	–	2%	8.3%	20.4%	N/A
Guarumo	April	1,370	7.6%	–	–	–	–	–	–	9.7%	–	24.2%	2.3%	2%	–	2.8%	3%	–	–	6.9%	–	–	–	–	–	16.9%	–	4.2	–	–	N/A
Invamer	April	1,008	6.1%	–	–	–	–	–	–	5.2%	–	38.3%	4%	3.7%	–	1.3%	4.4%	-	–	11.8%	–	–	–	–	–	15.9%	–	4.6%	–	4.6%	5%
CNC	8–18 March	4,435	6%	2%	–	–	–	4%	–	6%	3%	23%	–	2%	–	2%	6%	–	–	9%	–	1%	4%	–	–	12%	1%	2%	3%	8%	N/A
Datexco	4–15 March	1,200	6%	3%	1%	–	–	1%	1%	4%	2%	19%	3%	1%	–	–	3%	–	–	3%	2%	–	4%	–	–	11%	–	–	9%	5%	2.8%

==== 2020 ====
Polling organisation/client	Dates conducted	Sample size	Alejandro Char	Alejandro Gaviria Uribe	Ángela Robledo	Aurelio Iragorri Valencia	Carlos Holmes Trujillo	Federico Gutiérrez	Fernando Carrillo Flórez	Germán Vargas Lleras	Gustavo Petro	Humberto De la Calle	Iván Marulanda	Jorge Enrique Robledo	Juan Carlos Pinzón	Juan Fernando Cristo	Juan Manuel Galán	Marta Lucía Ramírez	Paloma Valencia	Rafael Nieto Loaiza	Rodolfo Hernández	Roy Barreras	Sergio Fajardo	Tomás Uribe	Blank	Margin of error
Invamer	19–22 November	1,008	5.5%	1.3%	–	–	2.1%	6.7%	–	–	25.9%	7%	0.6%	–	–	–	7.2%	18.7%	–	–	–	0.6%	20.5%	–	3.9%	3%
Guarumo	27–30 September	1,257	11.2%	–	–	–	–	12.1%	–	–	13.4%	–	–	–	1.7%	–	8%	2.1%	–	–	1.0%	–	18.1%	–	–	N/A
CNC	8 September	809	2%	1%	–	–	1%	5%	–	3%	16%	5%	–	2%	–	–	8%	6%	–	–	–	–	20%	5%	3%	N/A
Guarumo	11–15 August	1,876	9.1%	–	–	–	–	12.4%	–	–	16.5%	–	–	–	–	–	–	5.7%	–	–	–	–	23.1%	–	–	N/A
CNC	3–6 August	1,207	5%	2%	3%	1%	3%	8%	2%	–	18%	–	–	2%	–	1%	11%	–	3%	–	–	–	16%	–	–	4%
Invamer	30 July–4 August	1,008	7%	–	–	–	–	8.9%	–	–	32.9%	12.1%	–	4.3%	–	–	–	11.4%	–	1.3%	–	–	19.9%	–	2.1%	5%

== Second round ==
=== Petro vs. Hernández ===
View source data.

Polling organisation/client	Dates conducted	Sample size	Gustavo Petro PHC	Rodolfo Hernández LIGA	Blank	No vote	Unsure/No answer	Margin of Error
Second round election	19 June 2022	–	50.42%	47.35%	2.23%	–	–	–
AtlasIntel	8–11 June 2022	4,467	47.5%	50.2%	2.4%	–	–	1%
YanHaas	5–10 June 2022	1,234	45%	35%	13%	–	7%	3.2%
GAD3	30 May–10 June 2022	5,236	47.1%	47.9%	5%	–	–	1.4%
Guarumo	6–9 June 2022	2,029	46.5%	48.2%	5.3%	–	–	2.5%
GAD3	30 May–9 June 2022	4,834	48.1%	46.8%	5.1%	–	–	1.3%
Mosqueteros	7–8 June 2022	6,000	43.83%	44.68%	3.54%	–	7.95%	1.27%
GAD3	30 May–8 June 2022	4,438	48.5%	46.7%	4.9%	–	–	1.5%
Invamer	3–7 June 2022	1,329	47.2%	48.2%	4.7%	–	–	2.69%
GAD3	30 May–7 June 2022	4,041	47.8%	47.1%	5.1%	–	–	1.6%
GAD3	30 May–6 June 2022	3,240	46.8%	47.8%	5.4%	–	–	1.7%
GAD3	30 May–4 June 2022	3,240	46.8%	48.1%	5.1%	–	–	1.3%
Guarumo	1–4 June 2022	1,958	43.3%	46.4%	8.4%	–	1.9%	2.5%
YanHaas	30 May–3 June 2022	1,234	42%	41%	13%	–	5%	3.2%
GAD3	30 May–3 June 2022	2,840	46.3%	47.9%	5.8%	–	–	1.9%
CNC	31 May–2 June 2022	2,172	44.9%	41%	3%	1.7%	9.4%	2.1%
GAD3	2 June 2022	553	45.6%	50.4%	4%	–	–	2.1%
GAD3	1 June 2022	555	45.1%	52.3%	2.6%	–	–	2.4%
GAD3	30–31 May 2022	1,199	44.8%	52.5%	2.7%	–	–	2.9%
CNC	30–31 May 2022	1,200	39%	41%	5%	1%	14%	2.8%
AtlasIntel	17–20 May 2022	2,781	39.8%	48.2%	–	–	–	2%
Guarumo	16–19 May 2022	2,258	45.2%	41.5%	8.6%	–	4.7%	2.5%
CNC	13–19 May 2022	4,412	40.5%	40.5%	3.7%	9.3%	6%	1.5%
Mosqueteros	15–18 May 2022	6,000	45.3%	35%	19.7%	–	–	1.27%
Invamer	13–18 May 2022	1,195	50.0%	47.4%	2.6%	–	–	2.83%
YanHaas	30 Apr–7 May 2022	1,232	46%	31%	–	23%	–	3.2%
Guarumo	25–29 Apr 2022	2,132	44.5%	37.1%	8.6%	–	9.8%	2.5%
Invamer	21–27 April 2022	1,243	56%	40.6%	3.4%	–	–	2.55
CNC	18–21 April 2022	4,599	44.1%	34.1%	4.9%	11.4%	5.5%	1.4%
CNC	4–7 April 2022	1,965	40%	38%	4%	10%	8%	2.2%
CNC	28–31 March 2022	4,206	42.6%	34.4%	4.5%	12.4%	4.1%	1.5%
YanHaas	14–19 March 2022	1,236	41%	32%	–	27%	–	3.2%

=== Other scenarios ===
The following charts display matchups involving a candidate who did not qualify for the second round.

==== Petro vs. Gutiérrez ====
View source data.

Polling organisation/client	Date(s) conducted	Sample size	Gustavo Petro PHC	Federico Gutiérrez EPC	Blank	No vote	Unsure/No answer	Margin of Error
AtlasIntel	17–20 May 2022	2,781	45.4%	39.4%	–	–	–	2%
Guarumo	16–19 May 2022	2,258	45.7%	42%	9.2%	–	3.1%	2.5%
CNC	13–19 May 2022	4,412	44.2%	34.9%	5.2%	10%	5.7%	1.5%
Mosqueteros	15–18 May 2022	6,000	50.9%	30.5%	18.6%	–	–	1.27%
Invamer	13–18 May 2022	1,205	52.7%	44.2%	3.1%	–	–	2.82%
CNC	2–13 May 2022	6,204	47%	39%	5%	6%	3%	1.2%
YanHaas	30 Apr–7 May 2022	1,232	47%	34%	–	19%	–	3.2%
Guarumo	25–29 April 2022	2,132	43.8%	40.9%	8.8%	–	6.5%	2.5%
Invamer	21–27 April 2022	1,306	52.4%	45.2%	2.4%	–	–	2.55%
CNC/Semana	18–21 April 2022	4,599	44.8%	36.9%	5.2%	8%	5.1%	1.4%
CELAG	1–19 April 2022	3,064	51.7%	32.6%	10.4%	–	5.3%	2.2%
CNC	4–7 April 2022	1,965	41%	39%	6%	7%	7%	2.2%
Guarumo	30 Mar–1 Apr 2022	1,865	40.1%	43.5%	7.4%	–	9%	2.5%
CNC	28–31 March 2022	4,206	43.1%	40.1%	4.4%	8.1%	4.3%	1.5%
YanHaas	14–19 March 2022	1,236	42%	35%	–	23%	–	3.2%

==== Petro vs. Fajardo ====
View source data.

Polling organisation/client	Date conducted	Sample size	Gustavo Petro PHC	Sergio Fajardo CCE	Blank	No vote	Unsure/No answer	Margin of Error
AtlasIntel	17–20 May 2022	2,781	41.5%	34.8%	–	–	–	2%
Guarumo	16–19 May 2022	2,258	45%	38.7%	12.3%	–	4%	2.5%
CNC	13–19 May 2022	4,412	43.6%	32%	5.9%	13%	5.5%	1.5%
Mosqueteros	15–18 May 2022	6,000	50.1%	25.8%	24.1%	–	–	1.27%
Invamer	13–18 May 2022	1,125	57.8%	39.0%	3.2%	–	–	2.92%
YanHaas	30 Apr–7 May 2022	1,232	46%	29%	–	24%	–	3.2%
Guarumo	25–29 April 2022	2,132	44.8%	36%	11.1%	–	8.1%	2.5%
Invamer	21–27 April 2022	1,215	56.5%	40.4%	3.1%	–	–	2.55%
CNC	18–21 April 2022	4,599	43.4%	35.8%	5.3%	10.5%	5%	1.4%
CNC	4–7 April 2022	1,965	39%	38%	6%	10%	7%	2.2%
CNC	30 Mar–1 Apr 2022	4,206	41.5%	38.3%	5%	11.2%	4%	1.5%
YanHaas	14–19 March 2022	1,236	41%	35%	–	24%	–	3.2%

==== Petro vs. Betancourt ====
View source data.

Polling organisation/client	Date conducted	Sample size	Gustavo Petro PHC	Íngrid Betancourt PVO	Blank	No vote	Unsure/No answer	Margin of Error
AtlasIntel	17–20 May 2022	2,781	46.4%	17.3%	–	–	–	2%
CNC	13–19 May 2022	4,412	46.5%	20.9%	7.5%	19.6%	5.5%	1.5%
CNC	18–21 April 2022	4,599	46.9%	23.2%	7.2%	17.9%	4.8%	1.4%
CNC	30 Mar–1 Apr 2022	4,206	44.7%	26%	7.1%	18.4%	3.3%	1.5%

== Coalition primaries ==
=== Historic Pact ===
View source data.

Polling organisation/client	Date conducted	Sample size	Alfredo Saade	Arelis Uriana	Camilo Romero	Francia Márquez	Gustavo Petro	Roy Barreras	No vote	Blank	Don't know/No response	Margin of error
Primary election	13 March 2022	–	0.38%	0.98%	4.06%	14.05%	80.5%	–	–	–	–	–
AtlasIntel	10–12 March 2022	2,736	0.1%	1.9%	3.9%	6.2%	85.2%	–	0.9%	–	1.9%	3%
Guarumo	24 Feb–4 March 2022	2,345	0.2%	1.8%	5.9%	10.5%	81.6%	–	–	–	–	2.5%
Invamer	24–28 Feb 2022	1,504	0.3%	1.7%	5.9%	13.5%	78.6%	–	–	–	–	2.92%
CNC	26 Jan–2 Feb 2022	2,206	1%	4%	4%	12%	77%	–	1%	–	0.6%	2.1%
CNC	26 Nov–7 Dec 2021	4,093	–	1%	4%	3%	89%	1%	1%	–	1%	1.5%
Invamer	26 Nov–1 Dec 2021	1,200	0%	2.8%	4.5%	7.5%	82.4%	2.7%	–	0%	–	3.49%

=== Team for Colombia ===
View source data.

Polling organisation/client	Date conducted	Sample size	Alejandro Char	Aydeé Lizarazo	David Barguil	Dilian Francisca Toro	Enrique Peñalosa	Federico Gutiérrez	Juan Carlos Echeverry	No vote	Blank	Unsure/no answer	Margin of error
Primary election	13 March 2022	–	17.72%	6.51%	15.77%	–	5.8%	54.18%	–	–	–	–	–
AtlasIntel	10–12 March 2022	2,736	21.3%	1.8%	14.8%	–	5.2%	49.3%	–	4.6%	–	3.1%	4%
Guarumo	24 Feb–4 Mar 2022	2,345	29.2%	4.2%	21.4%	–	11.8%	33.4%	–	–	–	–	2.5%
Invamer	24–28 Feb 2022	1,504	24.7%	12.3%	15.5%	–	18.7%	28.9%	–	–	–	–	2.92%
CNC	26 Jan–2 Feb 2022	2,206	30%	5%	6%	–	21%	30%	–	5%	–	3%	2.1%
CNC	26 Nov–7 Dec 2021	4,093	34%	–	4%	6%	21%	24%	5%	4%	–	2%	1.5%
Invamer	26 Nov–1 Dec 2021	1,200	26.1%	–	8.8%	10.6%	22.7%	26.4%	4.3%	–	1%	–	3.49%

=== Hope Center ===
View source data.

Polling organisation/client	Date conducted	Sample size	Alejandro Gaviria	Carlos Amaya	Jorge Enrique Robledo	Juan Fernando Cristo	Juan Manuel Galán	Sergio Fajardo	No vote	Blank	Unsure/no answer	Margin of error
Primary election	13 March 2022	–	15.58%	20.89%	7.46%	–	22.55%	33.5%	–	–	–	–
AtlasIntel	10–12 March 2022	2,736	17.7%	10.2%	5.2%	–	13.8%	46.1%	3.2%	–	3.9%	5%
Guarumo	24 Feb–4 Mar 2022	2,345	21.5%	10.4%	8.5%	–	22.1%	37.5%	–	–	–	2.5%
Invamer	24–28 Feb 2022	1,504	12.9%	14.9%	10.5%	–	23.9%	37.8%	–	–	–	2.92%
CNC	26 Jan–2 Feb 2022	2,206	11%	8%	5%	1%	31%	39%	4%	–	1%	2.1%
CNC	26 Nov–7 Dec 2021	4,093	17%	4%	3%	–	31%	43%	2%	–	2%	1.5%
Invamer	26 Nov–1 Dec 2021	1,200	9.5%	5.3%	5.5%	3.1%	32.4%	43.5%	–	0.7%	–	3.49%
