= Soy Porque Somos =

Colombian political party

I Am Because We Are Soy Porque Somos
- Abbreviation: SPS
- Leader: Francia Márquez
- Founded: 21 July 2021
- Ideology: Afro-Colombian interests Ubuntu philosophy Feminism; Environmentalism; Indigenismo; Progressivism; Anti-racism
- Political position: Left-wing
- National affiliation: Historic Pact
- Colours: Black
- Senate: 0 / 108
- Chamber of Representatives: 1 / 172

Website
- Facebook page

Soy Porque Somos (SPS ; lit. 'I Am Because We Are') is a Colombian left-wing political movement and former party of Afro-Colombian origin founded on 21 July 2021. It was one of the movements that make up the Historic Pact, a political coalition that led Gustavo Petro to the presidency. The Vice President of Colombia Francia Márquez is the founder and leader of the movement.

This movement was inspired by the ubuntu philosophy of South African origin and promoted ideas such as: social, economic, gender, racial and environmental justice, the protection of human rights, among others.

== History ==
=== Historic Pact and presidential candidacy of Francia Márquez ===
On July 21, 2021, in a public act in the municipality of Santander de Quilichao, the Soy Porque Somos movement was officially launched, with the aim of supporting the presidential candidacy of Francia Márquez, and the movement's participation in the coalition was also announced. led by Gustavo Petro, the Historic Pact. Márquez would participate in the inter-party consultation of the coalition, in which the winner would be the only presidential candidate of the Pact, it was also suggested that the second most voted candidacy be the vice-presidential formula, although this was not formally agreed.

The movement needed to collect signatures to register its presidential candidacy, however the signatures obtained were insufficient, so the movement had to seek the endorsement of another political group belonging to the Historical Pact that had legal status before the National Electoral Council. Initially they obtained the endorsement of the Indigenous Authorities of Colombia party and later that of the Alternative Democratic Pole.

In January 2022, during the campaign for the legislative elections in March, the movement was in talks about whether or not it should continue within the Historic Pact due to the failure of the coalition to include them in the first 20 places of the closed list for the Senate. The community decided to remain in the coalition, however the two candidates who were placed in an unfavorable position, Carlos Reyes and María Vicenta Moreno, resigned from the list.

The movement presented three candidates to the Chamber of Representatives for the Special Constituency of Black Communities, these were Ali Bantú Ashanti, Ariel Rossebel Palacios and Idalmy Minota Terán, none were elected.

=== Vice-presidential candidacy and presidential election ===
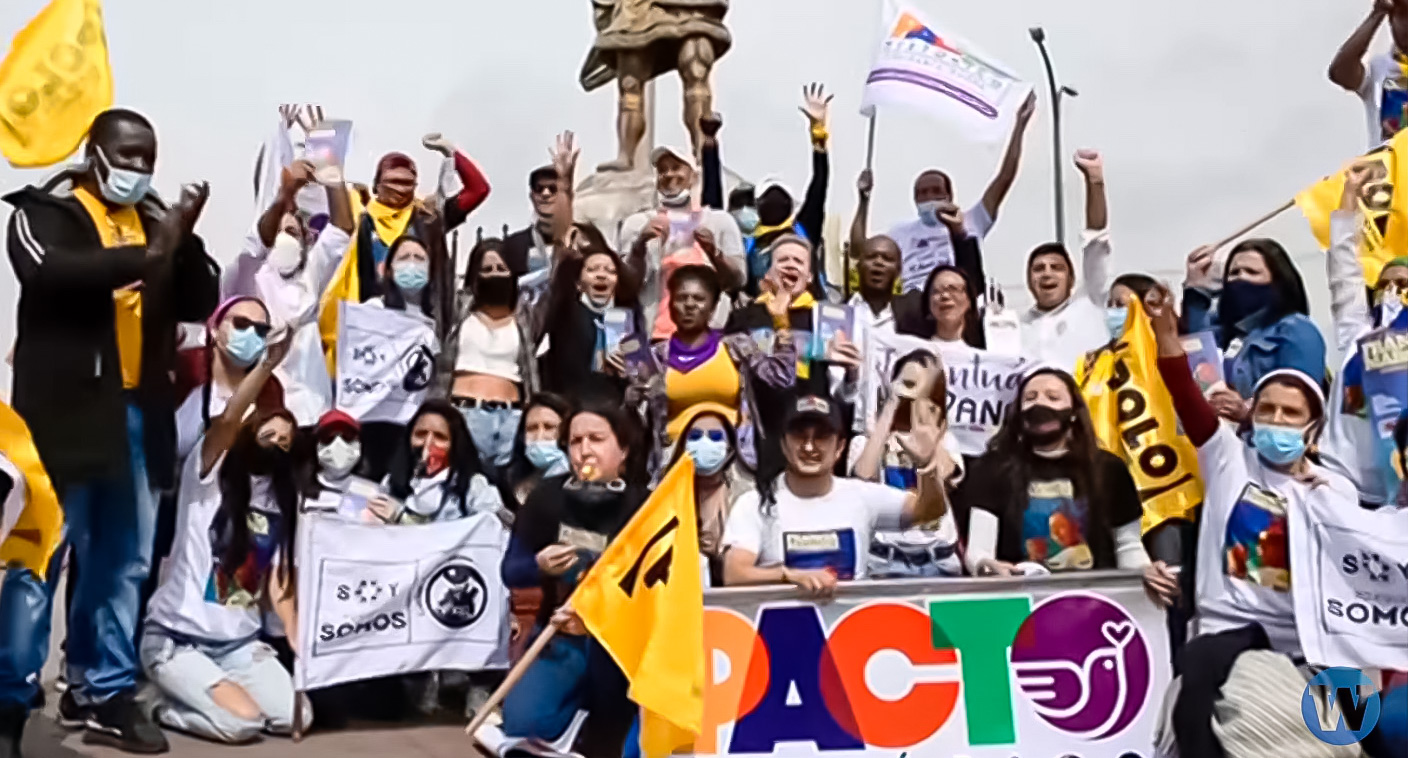
Francia Márquez accompanied by supporters of Soy Porque Somos and the PDA, during the 2022 presidential campaign.

During the legislative elections, the inter-party consultations of the coalitions of the Historical Pact, Hope Center Coalition and Team for Colombia were held simultaneously. Francia Márquez achieved second place in the coalition consultation behind Gustavo Petro and she was considered the surprise of the elections by obtaining more than 700 thousand votes.

The presidential elections were held on 29 May 2022 where they obtained the first voting place with more than 8 million 500 thousand votes, giving them the step to the second electoral round that was held on 19 June. Finally, with more than 11 million votes, they defeated the ticket of Rodolfo Hernández and Marelen Castillo in the ballot. Francia Márquez was sworn in as vice president on 7 August 2022.

==== Representation in government ====
During the junction between the incoming Government of Gustavo Petro and the outgoing Government of Iván Duque, the movement was represented in the general committee by Aurora Vergara, an academic who is director of the Center for Afrodiasporic Studies (CEAF) and in the junction of the area of «Poblaciones» through Clemencia Carabalí, from Cauca, and Graybern Livingston Forbes, a Raizal from San Andrés.

Likewise, the academic Irene Vélez Torres from the University of Valle, very close to Francia Márquez and the Soy Because We Are movement, was appointed to join the Science team. A debate was generated due to the rumor of the possible appointment of the academic to occupy the position of Minister of Science and Technology due to the approach of the movement and Vélez Torres on "hegemonic science", a position that was criticized by some scientists such as Moisés Wasserman. Finally, Irene Vélez Torres was appointed as the new Minister of Mines and Energy.

== See also ==
- Historic Pact for Colombia
- 2022 Colombian presidential election
