= Rodrigo Lara Sánchez =

Colombian politician

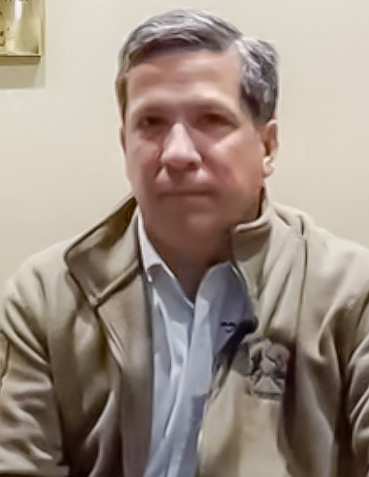

Mayor of Neiva
- In office 1 January 2016 – 31 December 2019
- Preceded by: Pedro Hernán Suárez Trujillo
- Succeeded by: Gorky Muñóz Calderón

Personal details
- Born: Rodrigo Armando Lara Sánchez; 9 March 1971 (age 55) Neiva, Huila, Colombia
- Parent: Rodrigo Lara Bonilla (father)
- Education: University of Cauca

Rodrigo Armando Lara Sánchez (born 9 March 1971) is a Colombian politician and physician who was mayor of Neiva from 2016 to 2019. Lara Sánchez was the vice presidential candidate of Federico Gutiérrez of the Team for Colombia coalition in the 2022 presidential election, which they ended in third place.
