= Rodrigo Lara =

Rodrigo Lara may refer to:

- Rodrigo Lara Bonilla (1946–1984), Colombian lawyer and politician, assassinated
- Rodrigo Lara Restrepo (born 1975), Colombian lawyer and politician, minister of the interior in 2026
- Rodrigo Lara Sánchez (born 1971), Colombian physician and politician
