= Luis Felipe Jaspe Franco =

Colombian architect

Luis Felipe Jaspe del Real Franco (April 3, 1846 – 1918) was a Colombian architect and portrait painter.

Jaspe was born in Cartagena. During his formative years Jaspe travelled to Martinique to get acquainted with its European-inspired architecture. Nonetheless, he did not pursue any formal training in architecture.

In 1888, the Mayor of Cartagena put Jaspe in charge of the construction of a tower on top of the city walls, which was to be engrained with a large watch. This neogothic tower has become since its completion a symbol of Cartagena.

In 1904 Jaspe designed Cartagena's main market alongside the bay of Cartagena. Later he would be put in charge of building the Adolfo Mejía Theater. Between 1903 and 1916 Jaspe designed the Saint Jerome Cathedral in Montería.

As a painter, one of his main pieces of work is an 1874 oil painting depicting the execution of nine local martyrs. As an amateur photographer he contributed to a recently found archive of old photos of Cartagena.

Jaspe was politically conservative.
