= Jorge Enrique Robledo =

Colombian architect and politician

Jorge Robledo
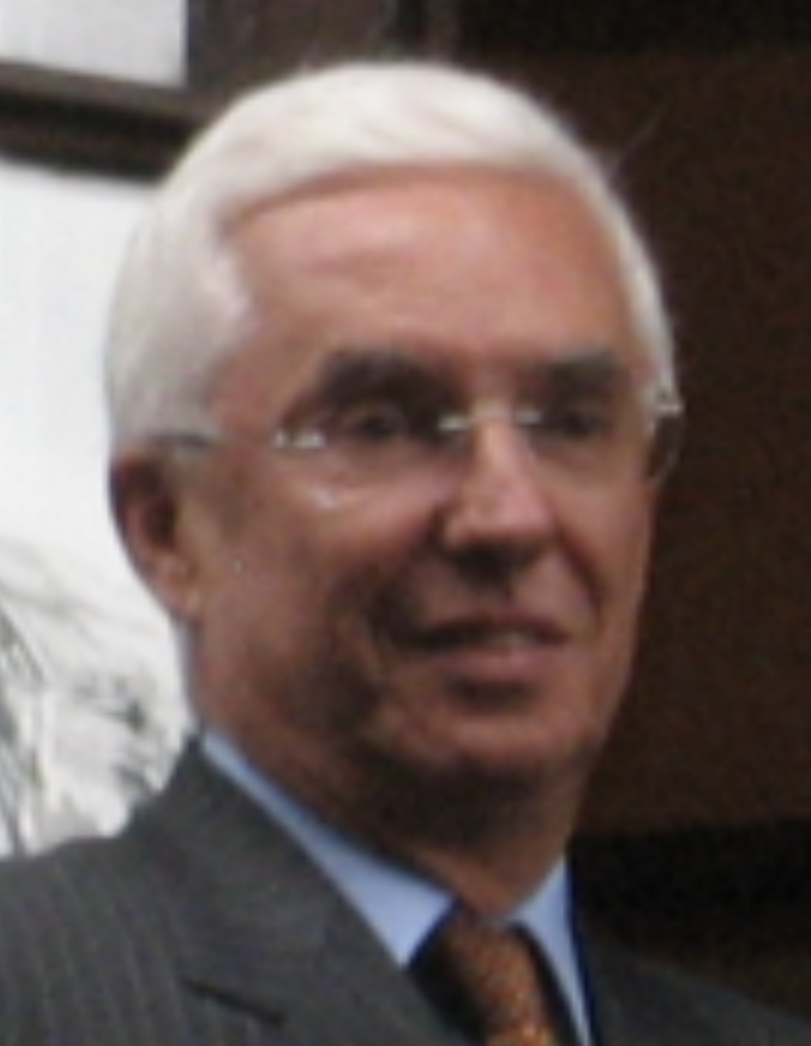

Senator of Colombia
- In office 20 July 2002 – July 2022

Personal details
- Born: February 11, 1950 (age 76) Ibagué, Tolima; Colombia
- Party: Alternative Democratic Pole
- Education: University of Los Andes
- Profession: Architect; Politician; Lecturer

Jorge Enrique Robledo Castillo (born 11 February 1950) is a Colombian politician, architect, professor, and author. He served as a member of the Senate of Colombia from 2002 until 2022, when he decided to leave his position in congress to pursue the office of president of Colombia, ultimately losing to Gustavo Petro. On 21 June 2023, Robledo announced that he was running for mayor of Bogotá in the October 2023 elections.

== Early life and education ==
Robledo was born 11 February 1950 in Ibagué, Tolima, Colombia. His family later moved to Manizales, Colombia where Robledo spent the rest of his childhood and later attended the Universidad de Los Andes to study architecture.

== Political career ==
Robledo was a member of the Alternative Democratic Pole, serving as the party's parliamentary spokesperson in the Senate. During the 2014 parliamentary election, he received 191,910 votes, the highest number of any Senate candidate. In October 2020, Robledo left the Alternative Democratic Pole to help establish Dignidad. He subsequently served as Dignidad's spokesperson in the Senate.

In October 2016, Robledo announced that he would run for president in 2018. In February 2022, Robledo registered as a candidate in the Hope Centre Coalition's presidential primary, which was held on March 13, to select the coalition's nominee for the 2022 Colombian presidential election.

=== Policies ===
Senator Robledo is known for his economic nationalist policies and his persistent criticism of neoliberalism and the dependency on foreign investment as the main economic driver of economic growth. He has also focused heavily on national sovereignty, industrialization, workers' rights, and the improvement of healthcare. Robledo maintains strong relations with Colombia's agricultural interest groups. He is a critic of Colombia's free trade deals with respect to food security and agricultural production.
