= Historic Pact for Colombia =

Colombian political alliance

Historic Pact for Colombia Pacto Histórico por Colombia
- Abbreviation: PHxC
- Founded: 11 February 2021
- Dissolved: 3 December 2025
- Succeeded by: Historic Pact
- Ideology: Progressivism; Left-wing populism; Anti-neoliberalism; Democratic socialism
- Political position: Left-wing; Factions: Centre-left to far-left
- Slogan: Colombia can!

Website
- pactohistorico.com

The Historic Pact for Colombia (Spanish: Pacto Histórico por Colombia, PHxC) was a left-wing political and electoral coalition in Colombia composed of political parties and social movements. It became the government coalition in Colombia upon the 2022 presidential elections.

This was launched on 11 February 2021 through a press conference where political leaders of the country participated, including Gustavo Petro, Alexander López, Iván Cepeda, María José Pizarro, Roy Barreras, Clara López, Aída Avella, Armando Benedetti, Jorge Rojas Rodríguez, Iván Guarín, and Martha Peralta. In September 2021 Agmeth Escaf, Luis Fernando Velasco, and Piedad Córdoba were added to the coalition. The coalition's presidential nominee, Gustavo Petro, advanced to the second round and defeated Rodolfo Hernández Suárez.

With an eye on the 2026 legislative and presidential elections, the member parties chose to start a process of reconfiguration. On 13 June 2025, the Humane Colombia, Alternative Democratic Pole, Patriotic Union, and Colombian Communist parties began the process of merging to create a new collective called Historic Pact (approval of which was granted in September of that year), replacing the coalition of the same name, while others will continue with their independent legal status or in new coalitions. The successor party received legal recognition on 3 December 2025, effectively ceasing the operations of its predecessors.

== Mission ==
- Obtain a majority in the Congress of the Republic by winning a total of 55 seats in the Senate and 86 seats in the Chamber of Representatives in the 2022 Colombian parliamentary election on 13 March.
- Present the country with an alternative power proposal that will be built by the social bases that accompany the Historic Pact.
- Win the presidency in the 2022 presidential election, with the first and second rounds being held on 29 May and 19 June respectively.

== Composition ==
=== Parties ===
Logo	Name		Ideology	Position	Leader
Logo	English	Spanish	Ideology	Position	Leader
	Humane Colombia	Colombia Humana	Progressivism	Left-wing	Gustavo Petro
	We Are All Colombia	Todos Somos Colombia	Social democracy	Centre-left to left-wing	Clara López
	Civic Strength	Fuerza Ciudadana	Social democracy	Left-wing	Carlos Caicedo Omar
	Alternative Democratic Pole	Polo Democrático Alternativo	Social democracy Democratic socialism	Left-wing	Alexander López Maya
	Patriotic Union	Unión Patriótica	Democratic socialism	Left-wing	Aída Avella
	Colombian Communist Party	Partido Comunista Colombiano	Marxism–Leninism	Left-wing to far-left	Jaime Caycedo Turriago
	Commons	Comunes	Democratic socialism	Left-wing to far-left	Rodrigo Londoño
	Labour Party of Colombia	Partido del Trabajo de Colombia	Maoism	Left-wing to far-left	Yezid García Abello
	Progressives	Progresistas	Progressivism	Centre-left to left-wing	María José Pizarro
	Indigenous Authorities of Colombia	Autoridades Indígenas de Colombia	Indigenismo	Centre-left to left-wing	Laudelino Bernier
	Alternative Indigenous and Social Movement	Movimiento Alternativo Indígena y Social	Indigenismo	Centre-left to left-wing	Martha Peralta Epieyú
	Broad Democratic Alliance	Alianza Democrática Amplia	Social democracy	Centre-left	Paulino Riascos
	Democratic Hope	Esperanza Democrática	Democratic socialism	Left-wing	Bernardo Gutiérrez
	The Force of Peace	La Fuerza de la Paz	Social democracy	Centre-left	Roy Barreras
	Independents (Note: This refers to the Colombian political party, not independent politicians.)	Independientes	Social democracy	Centre-left	Daniel Quintero
	I Am Because We Are	Soy Porque Somos	Indigenismo	Left-wing	Francia Márquez

=== Movements ===
Logo	Name		Ideology	Position	Leader
Logo	English	Spanish	Ideology	Position	Leader
	Civic Power	Poder Ciudadano	Democratic socialism	Left-wing	Piedad Córdoba
	Movement for the Defense of the People's Rights	Movimiento por la Defensa de los Derechos del Pueblo	Democratic socialism	Left-wing	None (Central Committee)
	Peoples' Congress	Congreso de los Pueblos	Left-wing nationalism	Left-wing	Collective leadership
	Free Citizenships	Ciudadanías Libres		Centre-left	Jorge Rojas Rodríguez
	Democratic Unity	Unidad Democrática	Eco-socialism	Left-wing	Luis Carlos Avellaneda Tarazona
	Movement for the Popular Constituent Assembly	Movimiento por la Constituyente Popular		Left-wing	Yafeth Ramos
	Movement for Water and Life	Movimiento por el Agua y la Vida		Centre-left to left-wing	Isabel Zuleta
	Democratic Integration Movement	Movimiento de Integración Democrática		Centre-left	Rafael David Cuello
	Patriotic March	Marcha Patriótica	Bolivarianism	Left-wing	Margarette Macaulay

== Electoral history ==
=== Presidential elections ===
Election year	Candidate	Running mate	First round		Second round		Result	Source(s)
Election year	Candidate	Running mate	Votes	%	Votes	%	Result	Source(s)
2022	Gustavo Petro (CH)	Francia Márquez (PDA)	8,541,647	40.34	11,281,013	50.44	Elected ✓	

=== Legislative elections ===
Election Year	House of Representatives			Senate		
Election Year	Votes	Percentage	Seats	Votes	Percentage	Seats
2022	2,922,409	17,62 (#2)	27 / 188	2,880,254	16,95 (#1)	20 / 108
