= Martha Peralta Epieyú =

Colombian politician

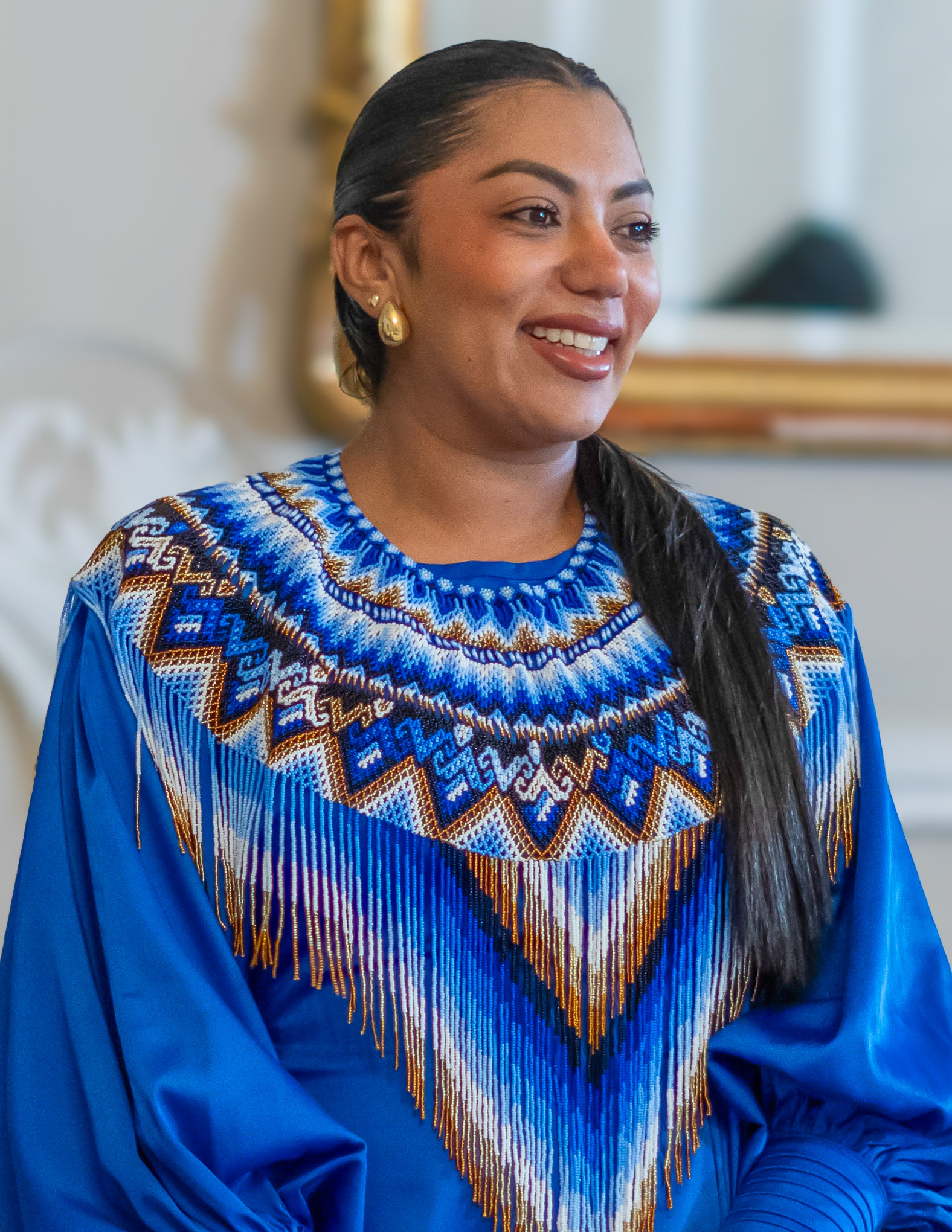

Senator of Colombia
- Incumbent
- Assumed office 20 July 2022

Personal details
- Born: Martha Isabel Peralta Epieyú Riohacha, Colombia
- Occupation: Lawyer; environmentalist; politician

Martha Isabel Peralta Epieyú is a Colombian lawyer, specialist in environmental law and indigenous leader of the Wayuu people belonging to the Epinayú Epieyú clan. She is president of the political party Movimiento Alternativo Indígena y Social (MAIS) (Alternative Indigenous and Social Movement). Peralta was elected to the Senate in the 2022 legislative election within the coalition of the Historical Pact for Colombia.

== Biography ==
Peralta was born in the village of Monguí in La Guajira, near the capital Riohacha. She studied at the San Antonio de Aremasain indigenous boarding school. She studied law at the Universidad Externado de Colombia, and completed a master's degree in Government and Public Policy with a specialization in Environmental Law at the Universidad del Rosario. During her study period she accompanied the National Indigenous Organization of Colombia (Onic) in several projects.

== Career ==
In 2015, Peralta joined the MAIS movement as a legal advisor; She later participated in the political training school of said party. She was also an advisor to the Onic before the National Land Agency. In 2017 she was appointed national director of her movement.

== Personal life ==
In August 2021, Peralta married Manuel Julián Molina, at the Aritaure ranch in La Guajira.
