= Isabel Zuleta =

Colombian activist and politician

Member of the Senate of Colombia
- Incumbent
- Assumed office 20 July 2022

Personal details
- Born: Isabel Cristina Zuleta López; 12 April 1982 (age 44) Ituango, Colombia
- Education: University of Antioquia
- Occupation: Politician, environmentalist, community feminist, activist, and defender of human and environmental rights

Isabel Cristina Zuleta López (b. April 12, 1982, Ituango, Colombia) is a Colombian activist, environmental advocate, and politician. An outspoken defender of environmental, women's, and human rights, she is recognized for her leadership in grassroots movements resisting extractivist megaprojects and defending the rights of marginalized communities.

Zuleta served as director and legal representative of the Movimiento Ríos Vivos (Living Rivers Movement) in Colombia, and is also a member of the Movimiento por el Agua y la Vida (Movement for Water and Life), both of which have played a crucial role in opposing the social and ecological impacts of large-scale development projects. As a social leader, she has peacefully denounced and demanded the restitution of "rights that have been stripped away" by development projects such as Hidroituango, advocating for justice through nonviolent resistance and community empowerment.

In 2022, she was elected to the Colombian Senate as part of the Pacto Histórico (Historic Pact) coalition, representing the Colombia Humana party. In Congress, she has continued to champion legislative initiatives focused on environmental protection, gender equity, and the defense of collective rights.

== Early life and activism ==
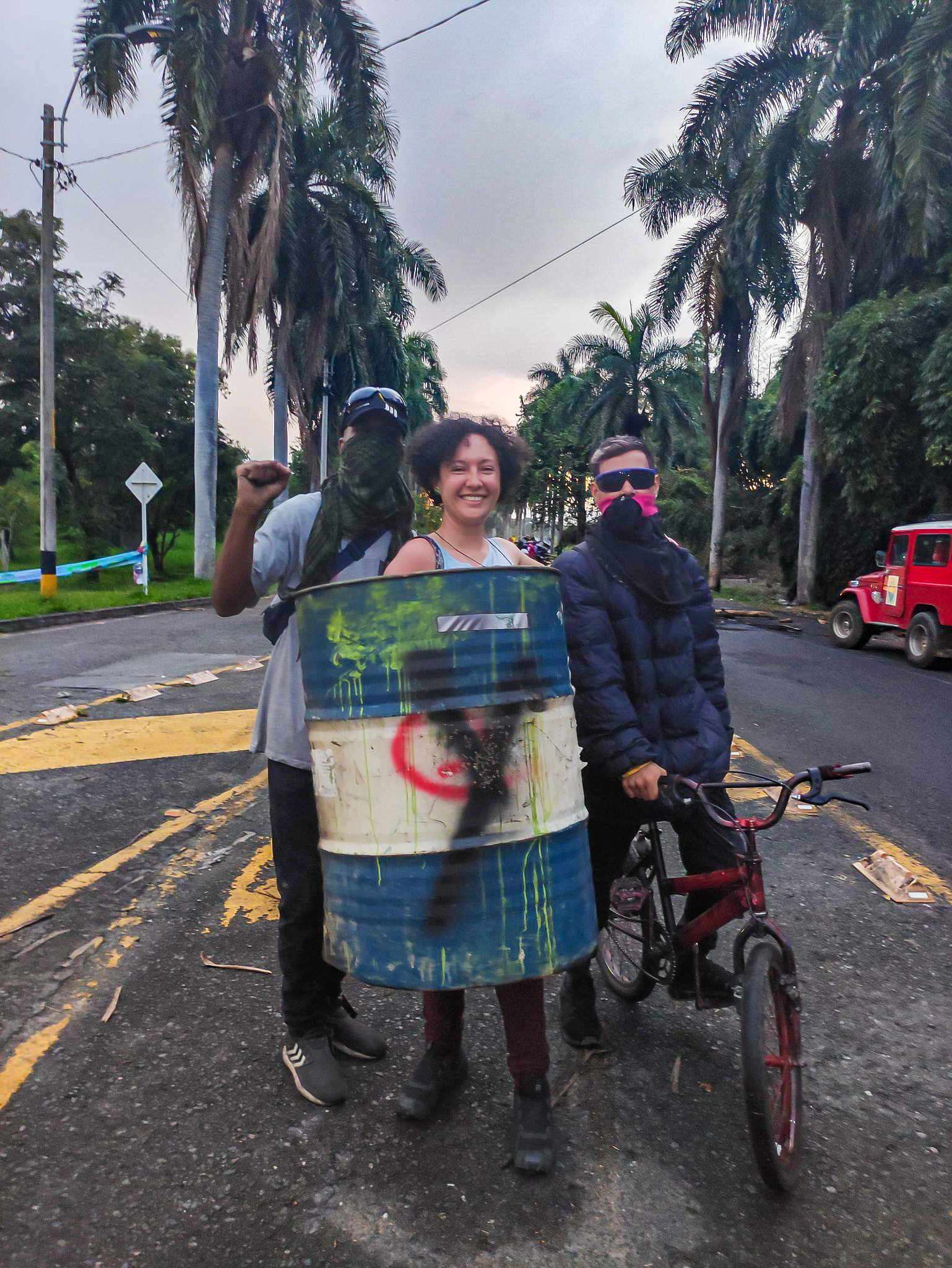
Zuleta visiting activists participating in the 2021 protests

Zuleta was born in Ituango, Antioquia, where she lived until the age of 14, when she was forcibly displaced after receiving threats from paramilitary groups. She studied sociology at the University of Antioquia and history at the National University of Colombia, Medellín campus. During her time at the University of Antioquia, she became involved in grassroots women's organizations composed of victims of the armed conflict.

She served as spokesperson, president, and legal representative of the Ríos Vivos Colombia Movement, a coalition of communities affected by extractive industries and large infrastructure projects. In 2008, several individuals and organizations in Antioquia organized in response to plans by Empresas Públicas de Medellín (EPM) to build what would become the largest hydroelectric dam in Colombia. These groups opposed the project due to concerns over environmental and social impacts and mobilized to stop its construction. Zuleta became involved in this process while studying at university and has since worked with communities in the regions of La Mojana region, El Cauca, and the Bajo Cauca Canyon.

Zuleta has spoken publicly about the connection between armed conflict and large-scale infrastructure projects, particularly the Hidroituango dam. She has highlighted patterns of massacres, forced disappearances, and systematic violence against social leaders in areas targeted for development, arguing that victims of the armed conflict are often the same communities affected by such projects.

In 2020, Zuleta was selected as a fellow in the Resilience Fellowship of the Global Initiative Against Transnational Organized Crime, a program aimed at building interdisciplinary and international collaboration to address the impacts of organized crime. That same year, she joined the Departmental Council for Citizen Participation and Social Oversight in Antioquia for the 2020–2023 period, representing the environmental sector. She also represented the Ríos Vivos movement in the Latin American Network of Communities Affected by the Inter-American Development Bank (IDB).

In 2021, Zuleta received the endorsement of Colombia Humana to run on the closed list of the Pacto Histórico coalition for the Senate. She was elected in the 2022 legislative elections.

As a senator, she has led the government’s Urban Peace initiative and was appointed to head the dialogue process with High-Impact Criminal Structures as part of President Gustavo Petro’s Total Peace policy, which seeks to reduce urban violence through negotiated agreements and institutional reform.

== Death threats ==
Zuleta's opposition to the Ituango Dam has led to her being the subject of surveillance, eavesdropping on her communications, and threats against her life. Some of the latter came directly from paramilitary groups.

Several members and leaders of the Living Rivers movement have been assassinated since the initiation of the Ituango Dam project.

== Political career ==
In 2021, Zuleta received the endorsement of the Humane Colombia party to join the closed list of the Historic Pact coalition, for which she was elected to the Colombian Senate in the 2022 parliamentary election. She was selected vice president of the Senate's Fifth Commission.

== Awards and recognition ==
Zuleta is well-known for being one of the biggest opponents of the Ituango Dam. She has appeared in various media, arguing against what for her is a project that violates the rights of communities and victims of enforced disappearances buried in the canyon.

In 2018, Zuleta, on behalf of the Living Rivers Movement, received the National Award for the Defense of Human Rights in Colombia, in the category "Collective Experience or Process of the Year", for organizations dedicated to the defense of indigenous communities' rights.

Amnesty International has recognized her as an important defender of human rights and the Cauca River.

In 2021, the social psychologist Florence Thomas named Zuleta one of the country's 10 women of the year for her contribution to the lives of Colombian women.
