= Federico Gutiérrez =

Colombian politician (born 1974)

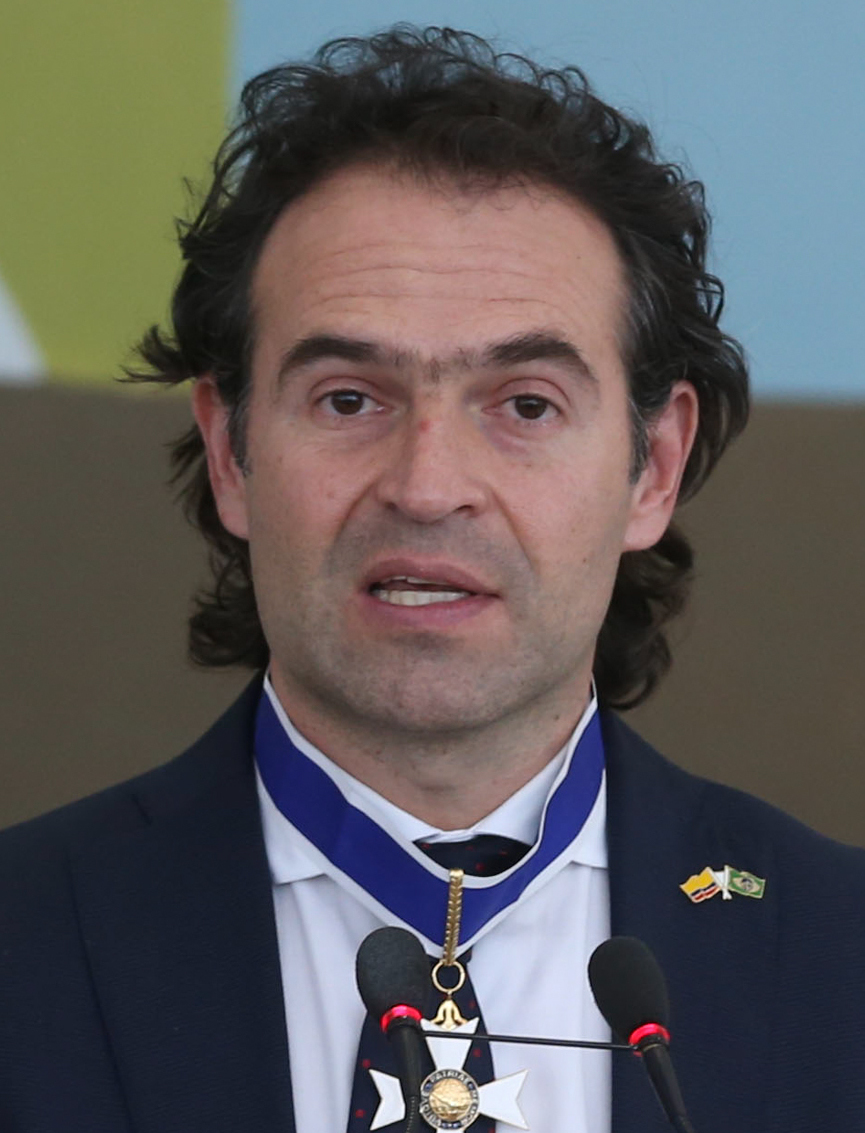
- Gutiérrez in 2016

Mayor of Medellín
- Incumbent
- Assumed office 1 January 2024
- Preceded by: Daniel Quintero
- In office 1 January 2016 – 1 January 2020
- Preceded by: Aníbal Gaviria
- Succeeded by: Daniel Quintero

Member of the Medellín City Council
- In office 1 January 2004 – 1 January 2012

Personal details
- Born: Federico Andrés Gutiérrez Zuluaga; 28 November 1974 (age 51) Medellín, Antioquia, Colombia
- Party: Creemos Colombia (since 2015)
- Other political affiliations: Liberal Party (1999–2003); Nuevo Partido (2003–2005); Party of the U (2005–2015)
- Spouse: Margarita Gómez (m. 2006)
- Children: 2
- Relatives: Juliana Gutiérrez (sister)
- Education: University of Medellín and Pontifical Bolivarian University
- Occupation: Politician, civil engineer, urbanist
- Website: www.federicogutierrez.com

Federico Andrés Gutiérrez Zuluaga (born 28 November 1974) is a Colombian politician, civil engineer, who currently serves as the mayor of Medellín, having held this office previously from 2016 to 2020. Before being mayor, he had been a member of the Medellín municipal council from 2004 to 2011.

A member of the Creemos Colombia party, Gutiérrez was the candidate for the 2022 Colombian presidential election as the winner of the primary of the conservative Team for Colombia coalition.

== Education, personal life and professional career ==
Federico Gutiérrez was born in Medellín in 1974, to Hernán Gutiérrez Isaza and Amparo Zuluaga Gómez. He has been married to Margarita Gómez Marín since 2006 and has two children, Emilio and Pedro.

He studied civil engineering and senior management at the University of Medellín and political science at the Pontifical Bolivarian University. During his post-secondary studies, Gutiérrez was elected to the youth municipal council (in 1999) and served as municipal planning adviser, participating in the analysis of the city's development plan for the years 2001 to 2003.

In the private sector, Gutiérrez worked as a consultant for HGI consulting and as a resident engineer for Vifasa. Between 2011 and 2015, Gutiérrez worked as a consultant on urban security for the Autonomous City of Buenos Aires (Argentina) and the municipality of Celaya (Mexico).

== Political career ==
Gutiérrez was elected to the Medellín municipal council in the 2003 municipal elections for the New Party (Nuevo Partido) and reelected to the same office four years later, but for the Party of the U (Partido de la U). In the 2007 election, Gutiérrez received 13,932 preferential votes, which at the time was a local record.

In 2008 during his second term he was president of the municipal council. In his first term, Gutiérrez was one of the few councillors who supported then-mayor Sergio Fajardo (2004–2008), and he later supported mayor Alonso Salazar although they later distanced themselves politically.

Gutiérrez ran for mayor of Medellín in the 2011 municipal elections, as the candidate of the Party of the U backed by senator Germán Hoyos. He was marginalized in a polarized race between his two main rivals, and placed third with 18.9% of the vote (120,278 votes). Gutiérrez's 2011 mayoral aspiration was supported by former President Álvaro Uribe, although Uribe's preferred candidate, Gabriel Jaime Rico, had failed to win the Party of the U's nomination. Gutiérrez has maintained good relations with Uribism, a redoubtable political force in the city and department.

== 2015 mayoral election ==
After his defeat, Gutiérrez began planning for a second mayoral candidacy, in the 2015 municipal election. He formalized his candidacy in 2014, forming an alliance with Federico Restrepo (as gubernatorial candidate) with the support of Sergio Fajardo's political movement. Both Gutiérrez and Restrepo did not seek out a political party's nomination, and instead launched their bids independently obtaining ballot access through signatures.

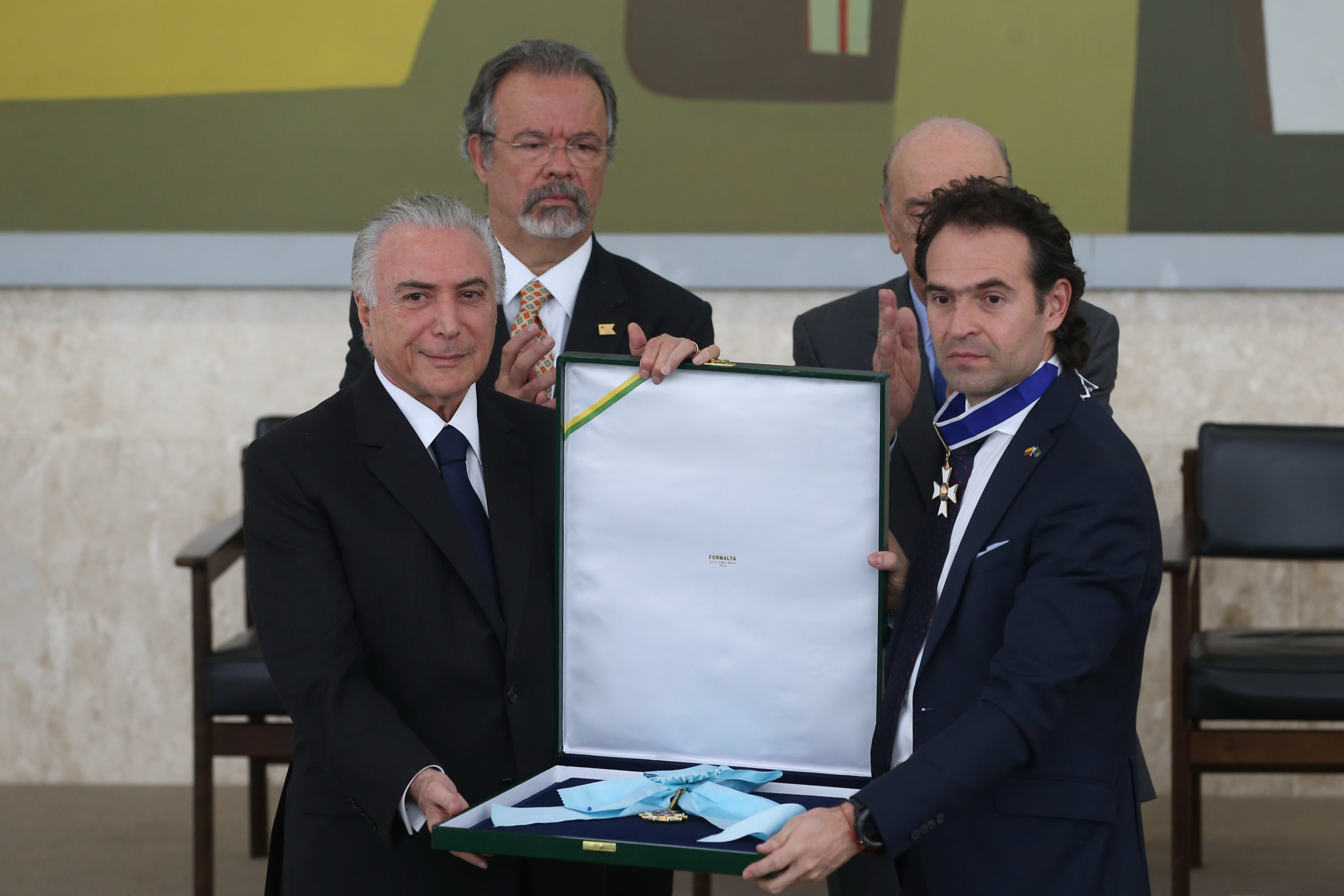
Gutiérrez receiving the Order of Rio Branco and the Order of the Southern Cross from Brazilian president Michel Temer (front left) in Brasília in 2016

His candidacy was challenged by former mayor Alonso Salazar, who had been Fajardo's mayoral candidate in 2007. Salazar entered the race in February 2015 and criticized Gutiérrez for being a "Trojan Horse" for Uribism, because of Gutiérrez's good relations with Uribe's supporters in the city and for supporting Uribe's presidential candidate Óscar Iván Zuluaga in the 2014 presidential election. In June 2015, Restrepo – pressured by Fajardo – dropped his alliance with Gutiérrez and recreated his tandem with Salazar as his ally in the Medellín mayoral race.

Nevertheless, Gutiérrez remained strong in the polls, although trailing Juan Carlos Vélez, the candidate of Uribe's Democratic Center by the end. Two weeks before the election, the Liberal Party's candidate Eugenio Prieto dropped out and endorsed Gutiérrez, in an effort to unite forces against Juan Carlos Vélez.

Gutiérrez was the surprise winner of the mayoral election held on 25 October 2015, narrowly defeating Juan Carlos Vélez by 9,589 votes (246,221 votes (35.81%) to 236,632 votes (34.42%)).

As Mayor, he figured in the top positions of the National Ranking of Mayors, with Alejandro Char, Juan Pablo Gallo, Rodolfo Hernández Suárez and Marcos Daniel Pineda.

In July 2017, his security secretary, Gustavo Villegas, was arrested for giving information to criminal organizations.

== 2022 presidential elections ==
In August 2021, Federico Gutiérrez completed the formal act to formalize his candidacy for the presidency of the Republic of Colombia independently, by collecting signatures without the support of any political party or having the backing of recognized politicians such as Álvaro Uribe. Even though several right-wing politicians and parties have declared they support Gutiérrez, he has been clear he has a preference for centrism, and he does not mind if he is tagged as right-wing or left-wing by those who are polarized in the political spectrum.

During November 2021 Gutiérrez joined other former public servers in the centre-right political coalition Equipo por Colombia, along with Enrique Peñalosa, Juan Carlos Echeverry, Dilian Francisca Toro, David Barguil, and Alejandro Char. Gutiérrez took the second place in the polls at the end of October 2021, due to his somewhat unexpected political success he was invited to the debate of Prisa Media where he was representing one of the 3 different political sectors of Colombia, he was debating with Gustavo Petro and Sergio Fajardo, two of the most famous and favorite politicians for recent elections, during that debate Gutiérrez showed himself as clear opposition of Gustavo Petro (number one in election polls), Gutiérrez gained favoritism of those who don't see Petro as the best option for Colombia and maintained favoritism in the polls as it was confirmed by Guarumo during a new poll completed during February 2022.

During the Parliamentary elections on 13 March 2022, different consultations to elect a presidential candidate also took place. Gutiérrez won first place for Equipo por Colombia with over 1.8 million votes, improving his chances to become President of Colombia in 2022.

The major traditional parties such as the Democratic Center, the Party of the U, Radical Change, the Conservative Party and the Liberal Party have all given him their support. He has campaigned on "preserving democracy and freedoms" against the left-wing candidate, Gustavo Petro, whom he accuses of representing a "populist and authoritarian project."

Critics say that Gutiérrez’s campaign has had little focus on policy proposals, with some analysts suggesting that he aims to amplify fears of a Petro presidency. Furthermore, whilst Guitiérrez is well known locally, he reportedly has lower name recognition than some of his opponents on the national level. Opponents have also attempted to tie him to the controversial presidents Iván Duque and Álvaro Uribe, the former of which has suffered from low approval ratings. They have attacked Gutiérrez for being the "candidate of Uribe", in part due to the endorsement Gutiérrez received from the party of Uribe and Duque, the Democratic Center Party. As a result, Gutiérrez has attempted to distance himself from Uribe; the latter himself acknowledged that his presence with him on the campaign trail would be more of a liability than an asset for Guitérrez. In May 2022, El Espectador published a revelation exposing the connections that Gutiérrez's campaign chief, Cesar Giraldo, has to the mafia and drug traffickers.

Gutiérrez finished third and supported Rodolfo Hernández Suárez for the second round, urging voters "to keep Petro out".

Political offices
| Preceded by Daniel Quintero | Mayor of Medellín; 2024–present | |
Party political offices
| New political alliance | Team for Colombia nominee for President of Colombia; 2022 | Most recent |
