= 2022 Colombian presidential election =

- 29 May 2022 (first round); 19 June 2022 (second round)
- Opinion polls
- Turnout: 54.98% (first round) ▲0.76pp 58.17% (second round) ▲4.24pp
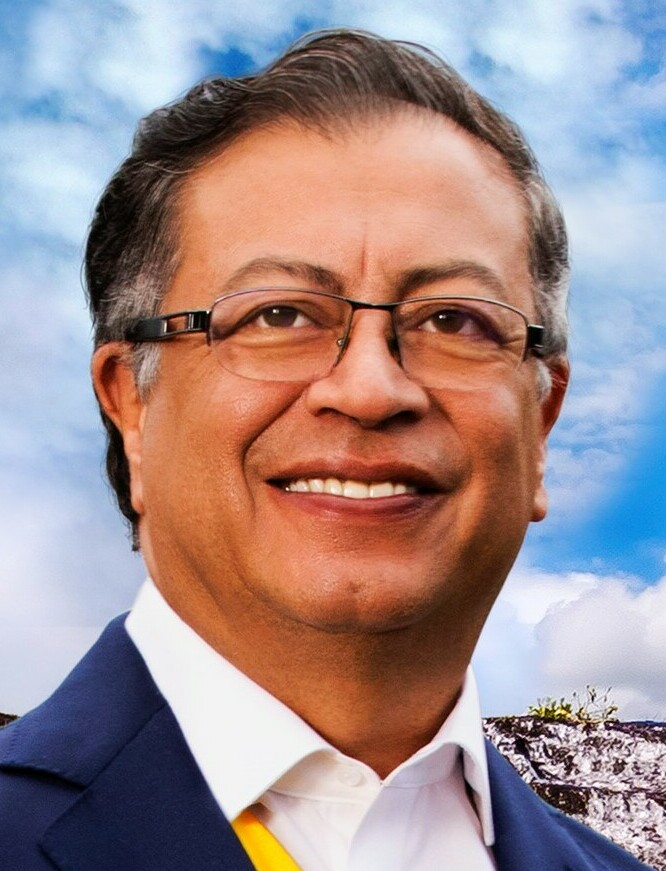

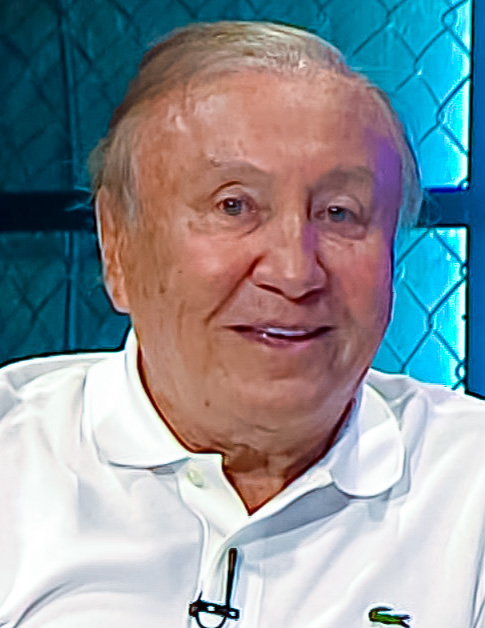
Nominee	Gustavo Petro	Rodolfo Hernández
Party	Humane Colombia	Independent
Alliance	Historic Pact	LIGA
Running mate	Francia Márquez	Marelen Castillo
Popular vote	11,292,758	10,604,656
Percentage	50.42%	47.35%
President before election
Iván Duque
Democratic Centre
Elected President
Gustavo Petro
Humane Colombia

Presidential elections were held in Colombia on 29 May 2022, with a runoff on 19 June 2022 as no candidate obtained at least 50% in the first round of voting. Iván Duque, who was elected president in 2018, was ineligible to run due to term limits. Gustavo Petro, a senator, former Mayor of Bogotá, and runner-up in the 2018 election, defeated Rodolfo Hernández Suárez, former mayor of Bucaramanga, in the runoff election. Petro's victory was considered the first left-wing candidate to be elected president of Colombia in the Colombian recent history, and his running mate, Francia Márquez, is the first Afro-Colombian elected to the vice-presidency, as well as the second female vice-president overall.

The elections were held in the aftermath of the 2021 Colombian protests amid poor economic conditions during the country's COVID-19 pandemic. Petro, a former AD/M-19 member who was defeated by Duque by over ten percentage points in 2018, was chosen as a candidate of the Historic Pact for Colombia alliance. Petro's left-wing platform encompassed support for land reform, universal health care, continuing the Colombian peace process, and expanding social services.

Hernández, an independent affiliated with the League of Anti-Corruption Governors, ran a populist campaign that emphasized support for law and order policies and anti-corruption efforts. Hernández experienced a surge in support in the final weeks of the campaign, which allowed him to overtake conservative candidate Federico Gutiérrez for a spot in the runoff. This surge in popularity was partially credited to his substantial social media following and TikTok videos, which led him to be dubbed the "King of TikTok".

Petro won the runoff with 50.42% of the vote to Hernández's 47.35%. Petro dominated in Bogotá and regions on Colombia's Caribbean and Pacific coasts, and received over 81% of the vote in the coastal department of Chocó. Due to an increased turnout among his supporters, Petro received nearly 2.7 million more votes in the second round than the first. The result was noted for a continuing trend of left-wing victories in Latin America, which has been dubbed as a "new pink tide".

== Background ==
During the previous election held in 2018, a run-off took place as no candidate attained 50% of the vote. The top two candidates were senator Iván Duque of the Democratic Center party and Humane Colombia nominee Gustavo Petro, a former mayor of Bogotá and a former AD/M-19 member. The election's issues included the FARC peace agreement, corruption, unemployment, and healthcare. Duque defeated Petro by over ten percentage points; however, there were subsequent allegations of fraud and irregularities. As the runner up, Petro became a senator per the Legislative Act No. 2 of 2015.

Widespread demonstrations against the policies of president Duque took place from late April to December 2021. Amid the COVID-19 pandemic in Colombia, which had dealt a blow to the economy and at a time when unemployment rates were high, Duque proposed a tax increase. Furthermore, a controversial bill was proposed in Congress that would have resulted in the privatization of healthcare. The majority of the protests were peaceful, with some cases of vandalism. According to human-rights groups, police reacted violently to protesters in various instances, leading to deaths and alleged cases of sexual assault. The protests led to a withdrawal of the healthcare and tax reform bills and the resignation of finance minister Alberto Carrasquilla Barrera.

== Electoral system ==
Colombian presidents are elected for four-year terms using a two-round system; if no candidate receives a majority of the vote in the first round, a runoff is held between the top two candidates. The vice president is elected on the same ticket as the president. Presidents are limited to a single four-year term, and Article 191 of the constitution requires candidates to be Colombian by birth and at least thirty years old. In line with the constitution, Colombian citizens by birth or by naturalization, aged eighteen or older have the right to vote. Several scenarios can cause the loss of the right to vote, as outlined in the constitution. Citizens in detention centers can vote from the establishments determined by the National Civil Registry. The civil registry inscription is not automatic, and citizens must go to the regional office of the registry to register. Legislative Act No. 2 of 2015 established that the runner-up in the presidential elections is given a seat in the Senate and their vice president candidate becomes a member of the Chamber of Representatives.

In order to be accepted as a candidate, applicants must either have the backing of a recognized political party in order to run as their official candidate, or to collect a minimum number of signatures in order to run as an independent candidate.

The National Registry confirmed that the minimum number of signatures required was 580,620, equivalent to 3% of the total valid vote in the 2018 Colombian presidential election, and that they had to be delivered to the registry by 17 December 2021. On 17 December, the National Registry confirmed that seven pre-candidates had delivered the necessary number of signatures: Alejandro Char, Rodolfo Hernández, Federico Gutiérrez, Alejandro Gaviria, Luis Pérez, Roy Barreras, and Juan Carlos Echeverry. Of these seven pre-candidates, Char, Gutiérrez, and Gaviria accepted the endorsements of political parties, thereby bypassing the necessity to run as independents, while Barreras and Echeverry later decided to drop out of the presidential race; this left Hernández and Pérez as the only independent candidates in the race.

== Primaries and party conventions ==
=== Historic Pact for Colombia ===
The Historic Pact for Colombia (Spanish: Pacto Histórico por Colombia) is a coalition of left-wing, progressive, and Indigenous politicians. Five pre-candidates representing six political parties or movements announced that they would be standing for election as the unified presidential candidate for the coalition. The candidate was chosen by public vote on 13 March 2022.

Gustavo Petro was announced as the winner of the public vote and was nominated to be the candidate of the Historic Pact for Colombia coalition.

=== Hope Center Coalition ===
The Hope Center Coalition (Spanish: Coalición Centro Esperanza), formerly known as the Coalition of Hope (Spanish: Coalición de la Esperanza) until 28 November 2021, is a coalition of centre and centre-left politicians. Five pre-candidates announced that they would be standing for election as the unified presidential candidate for the coalition. The candidate was chosen by public vote on 13 March 2022.

Sergio Fajardo was announced as the winner of the public vote and was nominated to be the candidate of the Hope Center Coalition.

=== Team for Colombia Coalition ===
The Team for Colombia Coalition (Spanish: Coalición Equipo por Colombia) is a coalition of centre-right and right-wing politicians. Five pre-candidates announced that they would be standing for election as the unified presidential candidate for the coalition. The candidate was chosen by public vote on 13 March 2022.

Federico Gutiérrez was announced as the winner of the public vote and was nominated to be the candidate of the Team for Colombia Coalition.

=== Other candidates ===
- Rodolfo Hernández, former mayor of Bucaramanga (League of Anti-Corruption Governors). Hernández announced on 29 June 2021 that he would run as an independent candidate. On 13 December 2021, Hernández announced that he had delivered nearly 1.9 million signatures to the National Registry in support of his candidacy.
- John Milton Rodríguez, senator (Fair and Free Colombia). Rodríguez was chosen as the candidate of the evangelical Christian party Fair and Free Colombia (Spanish: Colombia Justa Libres) at the party's national convention in November 2021, obtaining 75% of the delegates' votes.
- Enrique Gómez Martínez (National Salvation Movement). On 1 November 2021, Gómez Martínez announced that he was relaunching the conservative National Salvation Movement (Spanish: Movimiento Salvación Nacional) that had been founded by his late uncle Álvaro Gómez Hurtado. On 1 December 2021, the National Registry accepted the return of the National Salvation Movement as a political party, and Gómez Martínez became the party's presidential candidate.

== Candidates ==
=== Summary of candidates ===
The following candidates registered with the National Registrar of Civil Status and appeared on the ballot of the first round. This list also displays the most recent political office held by each candidate.

Party	Presidential nominee	Vice-Presidential nominee (Note: Same party as the presidential nominee, unless mentioned in parentheses)	Coalition
Independent	Rodolfo Hernández Mayor of Bucaramanga (2016–2019)	Marelen Castillo	League of Anti-Corruption Governors
Humane Colombia	Gustavo Petro Senator (2018–2022)	Francia Márquez (SPS)	Historic Pact for Colombia

=== Candidates not in the runoff ===
Party	Presidential nominee	Vice-Presidential nominee	Coalition
Colombia Justa Libres	John Milton Rodríguez Senator (2018–2022)	Sandra de las Lajas Secretary of Culture of Cali (2012)	—N/a
Creemos Colombia	Federico Gutiérrez Mayor of Medellín (2016–2019)	Rodrigo Lara Sánchez Mayor of Neiva (2016–2019)	Team for Colombia
Independent Social Alliance	Sergio Fajardo Governor of Antioquia (2012–2015)	Luis Gilberto Murillo (CR) Minister of Environment (2016–2017)	Hope Center Coalition
National Salvation Movement	Enrique Gómez	Carlos Cuartas	—N/a

=== Withdrew ===
- Óscar Iván Zuluaga, former Minister of Finance and Public Credit and runner-up in the 2014 Colombian presidential election (Democratic Center). It was announced that the candidate for the right wing Democratic Center party would be chosen via two polls conducted internally during November 2021. The polls were conducted by the two polling agencies Centro Nacional de Consultoría (CNC) and YanHass via telephone, and polled 2,100 party members (comprising 25% of the final weighting) and 2,100 members of the public (comprising the remaining 75% weighting). In both polls Zuluaga emerged comfortably as the preferred candidate, winning 53% of the vote in the CNC poll and 52% of the vote in the YanHass poll, and he was announced as the Democratic Center's candidate on 22 November 2021. He beat four other pre-candidates: María Fernanda Cabal (23% and 27% in the CNC and YanHass polls, respectively), Paloma Valencia (11% and 9%), Alirio Barrera (8% and 7%), and Rafael Nieto Loiaza (5% and 5%). The result of the vote caused controversy, with Cabal in particular disputing the results of the polls and accusing current president Iván Duque (also of the Democratic Center party) of interfering with the voting process to ensure that Zuluaga would win. Following his victory, Zuluaga was invited to join the Team for Colombia Coalition, but he originally declined the invitation. However, following Federico Gutiérrez's nomination as the Team for Colombia candidate, Zuluaga withdrew his candidacy and stated that he would support Gutiérrez's campaign.
- Luis Gilberto Murillo, former governor of Chocó and former Minister of Environment and Sustainable Development (Colombia Reborn). Murillo had been expected to be a pre-candidate for the Hope Center Coalition, but on 21 January 2022 he announced that he would run independently as the candidate for the Colombia Reborn (Spanish: Colombia Renaciente) party. He later stated that he had not felt welcome within the Hope Center Coalition. However, on 17 March he announced he would suspend his presidential bid to become the vice presidential nominee of the Hope Center Coalition.
- Luis Pérez, former mayor of Medellín and former governor of Antioquia (Colombia Think Big). Pérez announced on 26 February 2021 that he would be running for the presidency as an independent candidate. On 15 December 2021, it was confirmed that Pérez had received the necessary number of signatures to be officially declared as a candidate. On 11 May 2022, Peréz withdrew his candidacy, citing a "hateful" and "polarised" political atmosphere. He stated that in the presidential debates, there is "no room for ideas, [but] only for insults and fights." Pérez also said that he intends to "return love to politics, so people do not vote out of fear".
- Íngrid Betancourt, former senator and member of the Oxygen Green Party. Betancourt announced her candidacy on 18 January 2022 and originally joined the Hope Center Coalition. However, following a dispute with fellow coalition pre-candidate Alejandro Gaviria, Betancourt declared on 29 January that she was leaving the coalition and would run as an independent candidate under her own Oxygen Green (Spanish: Verde Oxígeno) party. Following a poor showing in the polls, Betancourt withdrew from the race on 20 May 2022 and endorsed Hernández Suárez.

== Campaign ==
The economist, former guerrilla, and former mayor of Bogotá, Gustavo Petro, previously a candidate in the 2010 and 2018 Colombian presidential elections, maintained a lead in most opinion polls and was set during the election to become the first president of Colombia from a left-wing coalition. In September 2021, Petro promised that he would retire from politics should his campaign for the presidency be unsuccessful. Petro said he would do so as he did not want to be an "eternal candidate". Of his campaign, Gwynne Dyer wrote: "Petro is a known quantity, active in politics for the past thirty years. He's not really radical, but he would be Colombia's first-ever president from the left, so for some Colombians his policies would seem extreme: things like expanding social programs, ending oil and gas exploration, and investing in agriculture." His political party, Humane Colombia, promoted the creation of the Historic Pact for Colombia coalition, which includes social movements, socialist, environmental, and feminist associations. The ideological diversity of the coalition was seen as a source of internal tension, and Petro tried to win over more of the middle class during his campaign, which led him to moderate his economic program and his criticism of the private sector, while trying to distance himself from Venezuela, which he previously supported; he maintained his position of re-establishing bilateral relations with the government of Nicolás Maduro. During the campaign, he was critical of the neoliberal system of the Colombian economy and its reliance on oil and gas, advocated progressive proposals on women's rights and LGBTQ issues, and supported a peace agreement between the state and the guerrillas. Proposals from Petro to change the nation's economic model by piling taxes on unproductive landowners, as well as abandoning oil and coal for clean energy, upset investors. Some feared his efforts to shift wealth from rich to poor could cause Colombia to become similar to present-day Venezuela. Critics claim his ideas are also similar to the early days of Hugo Chávez's government in Venezuela. Petro was critical of the Maduro government's commitment to oil usage whilst on the campaign trail. In an interview with Le Monde, Petro argued that "Maduro's Venezuela and Duque's Colombia are more similar than they seem", pointing to both governments' commitment to non-renewable energy and the "authoritarian drift" of the two. Regarding Chávez, Petro praised his efforts to bolster equality but said that Chávez "made a serious mistake of linking his social program to oil revenues". During the campaign, Petro and his running mate Francia Márquez faced numerous death threats from paramilitary groups. Petro cancelled rallies in the Colombian coffee region in early May 2022 after his security team uncovered an alleged plot by the La Cordillera gang. In response to this and other similar situations, 90 elected officials and prominent individuals from 20 countries signed an open letter expressing concern and condemnation of attempts of political violence against Márquez and Petro. The letter highlighted the assassination of over 50 social leaders, trade unionists, environmentalists, and other community representatives in 2022. Signatories of the letter included former Ecuadorian president Rafael Correa, American linguist and philosopher Noam Chomsky, and French member of the National Assembly Jean-Luc Mélenchon. Petro received the support of Luis Gilberto Murillo.

The conservative liberal coalition, Team for Colombia, made up of significant figures ranging from the centre, centre-right, and right-wing, was placed as second most voted in some opinion polls. The coalition was seen as having strong support among the upper socio-economic strata in the big cities. In August 2021, Federico Gutiérrez, the former popular mayor of Medellín, completed the formal act to formalize his candidacy for the presidency independently, by collecting signatures without the support of any political party or having the backing of recognized politicians such as Álvaro Uribe. As the Democratic Center party nominee Óscar Iván Zuluaga withdrew his own candidacy and endorsed Gutiérrez, his opponents attempted to link his candidacy to controversial party members, including the founder and former president Uribe and incumbent president Iván Duque, who suffered from high disapproval ratings. Gutiérrez also reportedly had lower name recognition than some of his opponents. In November 2021, Gutiérrez joined other former public servers in his coalition, along with Enrique Peñalosa, Juan Carlos Echeverry, Dilian Francisca Toro, David Barguil, and Alejandro Char. Gutiérrez took the second place in the polls at the end of October 2021. Due to his somewhat unexpected political success, he was invited to the debate of Prisa Media where he represented one of the three different political sectors of Colombia, debating with Petro and Fajardo. During the debate, Gutiérrez showed his opposition to Petro and gained favor among those who did not see Petro as the best option for Colombia. During the parliamentary elections on 13 March 2022, different consultations to elect a presidential candidate also took place. Gutiérrez and his coalition won first place with over 1.8 million votes, improving his chances of becoming President of Colombia in 2022. Gutiérrez received backing from the Liberal Party, the Conservative Party, the Party of the U, and the Radical Change party, which would have guaranteed him a majority in Congress if he was elected. Former president and Liberal Party chief César Gaviria explained his backing in a statement: "We are in total agreement that we must dedicate ourselves to the vulnerable, poor, marginalized people of this country, to the indigenous, the Afro-descendants, to young people." Gutiérrez also agreed to include anti-poverty and social development efforts in his manifesto, and a boost for education and health services. In May 2022, El Espectador published an article exposing the connections of Gutiérrez's campaign chief, Cesar Giraldo, to the mafia and drug traffickers.

The businessman and former mayor of Bucaramanga, Rodolfo Hernández Suárez, backed by the far-right party League of Anti-Corruption Governors, declared his candidacy in 2022 as an independent, with Marelen Castillo as his running-mate. He campaigned against the corruption of the traditional political class and emphasizing his image as a successful entrepreneur who can transform Colombia. He fully financed his own campaign, and promised to get rid of corruption in Colombia. He proposed to declare a state of emergency for 90 days and suspend all judicial and administrative functions "in order to address corruption". Dyer commented: "He will rule by decree, in other words, and he gets to choose who is arrested. It could end up as a populist dictatorship." He also promised major budget cuts, eliminating the use of presidential planes and helicopters, and donating all the money he would receive as president. He said he would give financial rewards to citizens who report corrupt state officials. He pledged to strengthen law and order and create jobs. He also praised Andrés Manuel López Obrador for his "anti-corruption efforts". He was dubbed as the "king of TikTok" on several occasions because of his large following and his extensive campaign during the 2022 presidential elections on TikTok. He did not claim to be on the right or the left; NACLA described his political position as a Realpolitik centrist, Reuters described him as centre-right, and other analysts struggled to label him. Also described as a populist, he was compared to Donald Trump and Silvio Berlusconi. He supports the decriminalization of abortion under certain circumstances, as well as the legalization of marijuana for medical use. He declared himself in favor of same-sex marriage, adoption of children by same-sex couples, and assisted suicide. His policies also included: lowering the value-added tax from 19% to 10%; a basic income for all senior citizens regardless of past contributions or lack thereof, and potentially those near or below the poverty line; progressively writing off debt for students in estrato 1 and 2 (both active students and those with the best grades); increased access to higher education in the regions; universal health care; switching from a punitive to a rehabilitative attitude towards drug addiction; granting Olympians and world record holders from the country state pensions; increasing social payments for successful sportspeople to up to COP100,000 per day; a 50% quota for women in public service and the presidential cabinet; welfare payments for those that maintain (rather than cut down) forested areas; and limiting fracking unless it meets environmental conditions. Regarding the Colombian peace process, Hernández stated his willingness to add an addendum to the FARC peace deal to include the National Liberation Army. He expressed support for a restoration of consular relations with Venezuela to address the violence on the border, saying: "Consular relations are necessary for good circulation, both commercial and touristic, and also because the border is where the increase in violence that Colombia is experiencing is also most felt." He received the backing of the third-placed candidate Gutiérrez for the second round, who urged voters "to keep Petro out".

== Debates ==
Media outlet and date	Location	Moderator(s)	P Present A Absent/Non invitee							
Media outlet and date	Location	Moderator(s)	Betancourt	Fajardo	Gómez	Gutiérrez	Hernández	Pérez	Petro	Rodríguez
El Tiempo – Semana 14 March 2022	Bogotá	Andrés Mompotes, Vicky Dávila	P	A	A	P	A	A	P	A
Red+ Noticias – El Colombiano – Vanguardia – El Heraldo – El País – El Universal – Q'Hubo Radio 17 March 2022	Antioquia	Luz María Sierra, Giovanni Celis	P	P	A	P	A	A	A	A
RCN Televisión – NTN24 – La República – RCN Radio – La FM 21 March 2022	Bogotá	José Manuel Acevedo, Claudia Gurisatti	P	P	P	P	A	A	A	A
Universidad Externado 29 March 2022	Bogotá	Karina Guerreroa, Darío Fernando Patiño	P	A	P	A	A	P	P	P
Pontifical Xavierian University – La Silla Vacía 31 March 2022	Bogotá	Sebastián Líppez, Juanita León	P	P	A	A	A	A	A	A
Canal Capital – Región Administrativa y de Planeación Especial 7 April 2022	Bogotá	Darío Restrepo, Lina Pulido	P	P	P	A	A	P	A	P
EAFIT University – El Espectador; 3 May 2022	Medellín	Cindy Morales, Hugo García	P	P	P	A	P	P	A	P
Noticias Caracol; 8 May 2022	Bogotá	Juan Roberto Vargas	A	P	A	P	P	A	A	A
Caracol Radio – Canal 1 – W Radio – NotiCentro 1 CM& – ANI; 10 May 2022	Medellín	Claudia Palacios, Alejandro Santos	A	P	A	P	P	A	A	A
El Tiempo – Semana – CityTV; 23 May 2022	Bogotá	Andrés Mompotes, Vicky Dávila	A	P	A	P	A	A	P	A
PRISA – Caracol Radio – W Radio – Tropicana; 26 May 2022	Bogotá	Roberto Pombo	A	P	A	P	A	A	P	A
Noticias Caracol – El Espectador – Blu Radio; 27 May 2022	Bogotá	Néstor Morales, Juan Roberto Vargas, María Alejandra Villamizar	A	P	A	P	A	A	P	A

== Opinion polls ==
=== First round ===
View source data.

=== Second round ===
View source data.

The polls revealed both generational and professional cleavages. Voters were more likely to vote for Petro the younger they were. The majority of employees, unemployed and students were planning to vote for Petro, while the majority of the self-employed, housewives and pensioners were planning to vote for Hernandez. The wealthier voters were, the more likely they were to vote for Hernandez.

== Results ==
Shortly after the first round, the process of judicial scrutiny commenced. The process found an increase of 0.1% votes, reportedly the lowest in Colombian history and slightly altered the final results for the initial round. As none of the presidential nominees obtained at least 50% of the votes, a runoff was held on 19 June 2022, between the top two candidates, Gustavo Petro and Rodolfo Hernández Suárez. Petro won the runoff, becoming the first left-wing candidate to be elected president of Colombia since the country's independence in 1810. The results for the second round saw the lowest record of blank votes in over 20 years. Furthermore, turnout for the run-off was 58.17%, the highest since 1998.

Candidate	Running mate	Party	First round		Second round	
Candidate	Running mate	Party	Votes	%	Votes	%
Gustavo Petro	Francia Márquez (SPS)	Humane Colombia	8,542,020	40.34	11,292,758	50.42
Rodolfo Hernández	Marelen Castillo	Independent	5,965,531	28.17	10,604,656	47.35
Federico Gutiérrez	Rodrigo Lara Sánchez	Creemos Colombia	5,069,526	23.94		
Sergio Fajardo	Luis Gilberto Murillo (CR)	Independent Social Alliance	885,291	4.18		
John Milton Rodríguez	Sandra de las Lajas Torres	Colombia Justa Libres	271,386	1.28		
Enrique Gómez Martínez	Carlos Cuartas	National Salvation Movement	48,643	0.23		
Íngrid Betancourt (Note: Withdrew before election but appeared on ballot)	José Luis Esparza	Oxygen Green Party	14,161	0.07		
Luis Pérez Gutiérrez	Ceferino Mosquera	Independent	11,507	0.05		
Blank votes			365,777	1.73	500,069	2.23
Total			21,173,842	100.00	22,397,483	100.00
Valid votes			21,173,842	98.75	22,397,483	98.72
Invalid votes			268,458	1.25	291,551	1.28
Total votes			21,442,300	100.00	22,689,034	100.00
Registered voters/turnout			39,002,239	54.98	39,002,239	58.17
Source: Registraduria

=== By department ===
==== First round ====
Department	Petro		Hernández		Gutiérrez		Fajardo		Rodríguez		Gómez		Betancourt		Pérez		Blank votes	
Department	Votes	%	Votes	%	Votes	%	Votes	%	Votes	%	Votes	%	Votes	%	Votes	%	Votes	%
Amazonas	10,117	46.00%	5,734	26.07%	4,487	20.40%	749	3.40%	216	0.98%	232	1.05%	43	0.19%	22	0.10%	391	1.77%
Antioquia	682,282	24.03%	521,390	18.36%	1,385,565	48.80%	154,470	5.44%	23,970	0.84%	7,553	0.26%	1,825	0.06%	2,966	0.10%	58,875	2.07%
Arauca	23,043	23.85%	56,079	58.06%	12,651	13.09%	1,677	1.73%	1,159	1.20%	221	0.22%	69	0.07%	49	0.05%	1,630	1.68%
Atlántico	479,049	54.75%	113,489	12.97%	233,614	26.70%	23,382	2.67%	9,469	1.08%	2,092	0.23%	513	0.05%	334	0.03%	12,975	1.48%
Bogotá	1,769,671	47.05%	833,016	22.15%	723,538	19.24%	299,266	7.25%	47,055	1.25%	9,925	0.26%	2,487	0.06%	2,404	0.06%	73,132	1.94%
Bolívar	359,593	49.95%	109,395	15.19%	204,057	28.34%	18,437	2.56%	13,576	1.88%	1,520	0.21%	449	0.06%	330	0.03%	12,514	1.73%
Boyacá	194,972	31.35%	321,045	51.62%	66,926	10.76%	23,207	3.73%	5,118	0.82%	1,892	0.30%	427	0.06%	260	0.04%	8,045	1.29%
Caldas	131,908	28.51%	147,287	31.83%	136,910	29.59%	29,682	6.41%	4,070	0.87%	1,341	0.28%	613	0.13%	412	0.08%	10,416	2.25%
Caquetá	47,959	33.83%	65,399	46.13%	19,807	13.97%	2,757	1.94%	2,202	1.55%	357	0.25%	170	0.11%	56	0.03%	3,047	2.14%
Casanare	42,674	21.76%	125,689	64.10%	19,498	9.94%	3,035	1.54%	2,415	1.23%	301	0.15%	93	0.04%	68	0.03%	2,282	1.16%
Cauca	388,206	69.86%	56,703	10.20%	73,860	13.29%	13,759	2.47%	10,109	1.81%	1,440	0.25%	579	0.10%	327	0.05%	10,681	1.92%
Cesar	190,420	44.00%	140,124	32.38%	80,791	18.66%	6,540	1.51%	7,928	1.83%	876	0.20%	264	0.06%	231	0.05%	5,570	1.28%
Chocó	96,638	72.44%	9,805	7.34	18,871	14.14%	3,733	2.79%	1,185	0.88%	579	0.43%	176	0.13%	127	0.09%	2,290	1.71%
Consulates/Abroad	95,850	31.60%	42,118	13.88%	136,511	45.01%	23,323	7.69%	1,689	0.55%	754	0.24%	273	0.09%	118	0.03%	2,628	0.86%
Córdoba	318,645	51.91%	95,201	15.51%	172,686	28.13%	9,896	1.61%	7,429	1.21%	1,109	0.18%	245	0.03%	202	0.03%	8,356	1.36%
Cundinamarca	472,538	34.20%	615,953	44.58%	194,820	14.10%	53,517	3.87%	15,588	1.12%	3,163	0.22%	1,041	0.07%	768	0.05%	24,159	1.74%
Guainía	4,966	47.22%	2,892	27.50%	1,773	16.86%	527	5.01%	107	1.01%	39	0.37%	25	0.23%	7	0.06%	179	1.70%
Guaviare	11,198	36.59%	14,534	47.49%	2,953	9.65%	575	1.87%	519	1.69%	57	0.18%	20	0.06%	19	0.06%	725	2.36%
Huila	162,609	32.50%	223,473	44.67%	88,155	17.62%	9,898	1.97%	7,246	1.44%	945	0.18%	266	0.05%	164	0.03%	7,465	1.49%
La Guajira	113,489	54.71%	37,587	18.12%	45,779	22.06%	3,379	1.62%	2,812	1.35%	675	0.32%	279	0.10%	95	0.04%	3,394	1.63%
Magdalena	226,501	49.45%	78,368	17.11%	128,355	28.02%	9,007	1.96%	7,324	1.59%	972	0.21%	300	0.06%	197	0.04%	6,998	1.52%
Meta	135,500	27.95%	253,918	52.37%	69,511	14.33%	10,295	2.12%	7,277	1.50%	961	0.19%	262	0.05%	183	0.03%	6,861	1.41%
Nariño	433,636	70.17%	66,437	10.75%	83,141	13.45%	14,925	2.41%	5,042	0.81%	1,776	0.28%	688	0.11%	299	0.04%	11,949	1.93%
Norte de Santander	107,617	15.83%	367,724	54.11%	169,066	24.87%	16,088	2.36%	10,144	1.49%	1,160	0.17%	339	0.04%	194	0.02%	7,238	1.06%
Putumayo	86,542	70.95%	17,483	14.33%	11,855	9.71%	2,016	1.65%	1,440	1.18%	216	0.17%	116	0.09%	63	0.05%	2,242	1.83%
Quindío	84,365	31.07%	80,780	29.75%	82,165	30.26%	13,819	5.08%	2,899	1.06%	599	0.22%	247	0.09%	151	0.05%	6,480	2.38%
Risaralda	164,204	35.42%	147,122	31.37%	112,665	24.30%	22,624	4.88%	5,036	1.08%	1,017	0.21%	506	0.10%	374	0.08%	9,975	2.15%
San Andrés and Providencia	5,996	40.31%	2,660	17.88%	4,544	30.54%	576	3.87%	521	3.50%	20	0.13%	13	0.08%	18	0.12%	526	3.53%
Santander	244,179	20.90%	782,378	66.96%	104,955	8.98%	14,063	1.20%	11,935	1.02%	1,696	0.14%	328	0.02%	271	0.02%	8,513	0.72%
Sucre	198,095	54.52%	40,093	11.03%	103,850	28.58%	5,985	1.64%	9,546	2.62%	807	0.22%	221	0.06%	110	0.03%	4,572	1.25%
Tolima	191,000	30.93%	242,949	39.34%	144,982	23.47%	18,466	2.99%	7,989	1.29%	1,502	0.24%	452	0.07%	274	0.04%	9,888	1.60%
Valle del Cauca	1,043,911	53.34%	329,898	16.85%	414,439	21.17%	78,108	3.99%	40,934	2.09%	4,631	0.23%	1,542	0.07%	1,237	0.06%	42,246	2.15%
Vaupés	4,741	67.59%	1,063	15.15%	763	10.87%	253	3.60%	30	0.42%	29	0.41%	26	0.37%	6	0.08%	103	1.46%
Vichada	5,654	33.54%	6,670	39.57%	3,220	19.10%	551	3.26%	272	1.61%	81	0.48%	41	0.24%	88	0.52%	278	1.64%
Source: Registraduria

==== Second round ====
Department	Petro		Hernández		Blank votes	
Department	Votes	%	Votes	%	Votes	%
Amazonas	12,883	54.61%	10,250	43.45%	456	1.93%
Antioquia	942,005	33.04%	1,822,700	63.93%	86,367	3.02%
Arauca	32,082	30.96%	69,473	67.06%	2,041	1.97%
Atlántico	672,832	67.06%	314,551	31.35%	15,915	1.58%
Bogotá	2,253,997	58.59%	1,480,198	38.48%	112,293	2.91%
Bolívar	493,041	60.88%	301,952	37.28%	14,758	1.82%
Boyacá	264,270	40.29%	378,899	57.76%	12,718	1.93%
Caldas	187,346	39.81%	267,988	56.95%	15,170	3.22%
Caquetá	72,816	43.78%	88,922	53.46%	4,578	2.75%
Casanare	57,331	28.01%	143,796	70.26%	3,534	1.72%
Cauca	515,074	79.02%	122,693	18.82%	13,994	2.14%
Cesar	250,499	53.00%	215,080	45.51%	7,011	1.48%
Chocó	127,846	81.94%	25,736	16.49%	2,440	1.56%
Consulates	114,610	37.52%	185,557	60.75%	5,209	1.72%
Córdoba	437,016	61.08%	266,999	37.31%	11,422	1.59%
Cundinamarca	624,965	44.16%	756,454	53.45%	33,608	2.37%
Guainía	6,536	52.51%	5,716	45.92%	195	1.56%
Guaviare	14,708	44.15%	17,601	52.84%	1,000	3.00%
Huila	216,533	40.65%	305,799	57.41%	10,318	1.93%
La Guajira	162,849	64.56%	85,101	33.73%	4,284	1.69%
Magdalena	302,432	60.22%	191,500	38.13%	8,262	1.64%
Meta	180,293	36.34%	307,137	61.69%	9,770	1.96%
Nariño	592,170	80.91%	126,198	17.24%	13,490	1.84%
Norte de Santander	149,413	20.86%	557,406	77.84%	9,223	1.28%
Putumayo	110,118	79.67%	25,549	18.48%	2,534	1.83%
Quindío	113,537	41.50%	151,653	55.44%	8,341	3.04%
Risaralda	216,227	46.16%	238,963	51.01%	13,188	2.81%
San Andrés and Providencia	8,545	51.31%	7,449	44.73%	659	3.95%
Santander	310,240	25.97%	871,291	72.95%	12,802	1.07%
Sucre	262,135	64.07%	140,507	34.34%	6,485	1.58%
Tolima	251,710	38.53%	388,640	59.49%	12,832	1.96%
Valle del Cauca	1,310,236	63.85%	695,059	33.87%	46,605	2.27%
Vaupés	6,447	74.03%	2,148	24.66%	113	1.29%
Vichada	7,634	39.36%	11,447	59.02%	312	1.60%
Source: Registraduria

=== Abroad vote ===
==== First round ====
Country	Petro %	Hernández %	Gutiérrez %	Fajardo %	Rodríguez %	Gómez %	Betancourt %	Pérez %
Algeria	–	–	50.00	50.00	–	–	–	–
Argentina	63.62	12.16	15.88	6.26	0.63	0.17	0.07	0.03
Australia	54.50	16.82	15.99	10.51	0.43	0.16	0.05	–
Austria	58.58	8.28	17.90	13.52	0.12	0.12	0.24	0.12
Azerbaijan	38.09	9.52	38.09	14.28	–	–	–	–
Belgium	55.42	9.19	21.51	11.79	0.26	0.13	0.26	0.06
Bolivia	30.81	21.22	41.02	4.48	1.02	0.81	–	–
Brazil	52.71	11.16	25.16	9.32	0.25	0.21	0.08	0.04
Canada	36.93	14.60	36.39	10.03	0.52	0.26	0.08	0.01
Chile	49.36	16.67	25.24	6.09	0.79	0.43	0.07	0.07
China	45.16	11.98	28.11	11.52	–	–	0.46	–
Costa Rica	21.27	15.45	54.82	7.21	0.33	0.30	0.05	0.02
Cuba	74.58	11.66	10.62	1.66	0.20	0.20	–	–
Denmark	56.98	4.46	17.31	20.39	0.27	–	–	–
Dominican Republic	19.64	13.79	54.62	9.39	0.84	0.46	0.15	0.07
Ecuador	30.64	17.96	42.44	5.45	0.94	0.54	0.41	0.15
Egypt	48.48	6.00	30.30	15.15	–	–	–	–
El Salvador	22.22	12.45	53.53	9.76	1.01	–	–	–
Finland	62.12	8.53	16.26	10.56	0.40	–	–	–
France	57.67	10.47	16.99	13.04	0.36	0.18	0.06	0.01
Germany	59.40	7.26	14.21	17.07	0.36	0.24	0.10	–
Ghana	32.43	13.51	32.43	16.21	–	–	–	–
Guatemala	15.82	16.57	56.62	8.61	0.64	0.43	–	0.21
Honduras	21.80	13.82	55.85	7.97	–	–	–	–
Hungary	62.24	9.18	16.83	9.69	1.02	–	0.51	0.51
India	34.78	4.34	47.82	8.69	–	–	–	–
Indonesia	36.00	8.00	34.00	20.00	–	–	–	–
Ireland	41.60	11.31	29.19	16.78	–	0.36	0.36	–
Israel	25.94	19.24	46.23	5.23	1.67	0.41	–	–
Italy	43.21	16.97	27.00	10.21	0.48	0.27	0.17	0.10
Jamaica	15.47	20.23	46.42	11.90	2.38	–	–	–
Japan	39.56	9.03	37.07	10.28	1.55	0.62	0.62	–
Kenya	41.66	5.55	33.33	19.44	–	–	–	–
Lebanon	6.04	12.08	71.81	6.71	0.67	1.34	–	–
Luxembourg	35.59	11.86	22.03	26.27	0.84	0.84	–	–
Malaysia	24.65	20.54	39.72	12.32	–	–	–	–
Mexico	35.67	10.13	40.65	11.93	0.41	0.25	0.05	0.04
Morocco	47.82	4.34	17.39	30.43	–	–	–	–
Netherlands	31.32	18.35	39.55	8.93	0.61	0.14	0.10	0.12
New Zealand	50.18	17.09	16.72	12.30	0.36	0.24	0.12	–
Nicaragua	23.91	20.65	57.17	3.26	–	–	–	–
Norway	60.46	7.97	15.94	13.28	0.33	0.33	0.33	–
Panama	21.52	16.27	52.73	7.47	0.74	0.35	0.11	0.02
Paraguay	19.81	17.11	51.35	8.10	1.80	–	–	0.45
Peru	26.78	17.12	43.29	10.44	0.94	0.37	0.12	0.04
Philippines	31.81	18.18	30.30	15.15	–	–	1.51	–
Poland	62.67	8.61	17.70	8.13	–	1.91	–	–
Portugal	49.12	11.72	24.72	11.25	0.95	0.47	–	–
Russia	78.18	9.69	9.09	1.81	–	–	–	–
Singapore	21.85	11.92	40.39	23.17	–	–	0.66	–
South Africa	32.18	4.59	48.27	12.64	–	–	–	–
South Korea	47.16	13.20	22.64	13.83	–	0.62	–	–
Spain	47.59	16.28	27.22	6.39	0.77	0.21	0.16	0.05
Sweden	60.77	8.14	17.87	11.12	0.79	0.29	0.09	–
Switzerland	49.36	8.59	28.42	11.93	0.51	0.33	0.11	0.03
Thailand	34.78	15.94	24.63	24.63	–	–	–	–
Trinidad and Tobago	30.00	20.00	35.00	11.66	–	–	1.66	–
Turkey	61.83	3.05	28.24	5.34	1.52	–	–	–
United Arab Emirates	14.52	40.50	39.62	4.52	–	0.12	–	–
United Kingdom	40.01	16.03	31.21	10.71	0.56	0.13	0.09	0.06
United States	16.12	11.97	64.28	6.31	0.44	0.22	0.04	0.02
Uruguay	50.47	15.37	22.58	9.10	0.37	0.75	–	–
Venezuela	14.43	34.36	44.87	3.46	1.40	0.53	0.09	0.03
Vietnam	50.00	7.69	15.38	19.23	–	3.84	–	–
Source: Registraduria

==== Second round ====
Country	Petro %	Hernández %
Algeria	33.33	50.00
Argentina	72.45	25.75
Australia	65.72	31.59
Austria	72.68	24.06
Azerbaijan	42.10	52.63
Belgium	67.22	30.14
Bolivia	35.28	63.70
Brazil	62.47	35.96
Canada	44.94	52.70
Chile	56.95	41.17
China	50.00	44.26
Costa Rica	25.47	72.88
Cuba	81.48	17.23
Denmark	73.82	22.05
Dominican Republic	26.56	70.96
Ecuador	37.65	60.47
Egypt	57.50	42.50
El Salvador	29.96	66.44
Finland	73.14	24.07
France	70.12	27.30
Ghana	51.61	38.70
Germany	74.38	23.08
Guatemala	23.18	74.58
Honduras	25.26	73.15
Hungary	76.41	20.51
India	35.00	35.00
Indonesia	50.00	47.82
Ireland	55.47	41.50
Israel	31.77	64.83
Italy	54.09	43.47
Jamaica	26.13	72.72
Japan	49.40	47.92
Kenya	62.50	37.50
Lebanon	17.47	81.55
Luxembourg	56.25	37.50
Malaysia	36.50	61.90
Morocco	43.47	30.43
Mexico	43.19	54.07
Nicaragua	25.96	71.15
Norway	68.91	28.04
New Zealand	64.41	31.88
Netherlands	39.08	58.96
Panama	27.66	70.92
Paraguay	24.65	73.51
Peru	34.15	63.98
Poland	68.50	29.50
Portugal	62.09	36.37
Philippines	49.12	45.61
Russia	84.75	13.41
Singapore	34.04	61.70
South Africa	33.33	64.19
South Korea	64.18	33.10
Spain	55.93	41.95
Sweden	68.67	28.76
Switzerland	59.22	38.74
Thailand	50.98	43.13
Trinidad and Tobago	36.50	60.31
Turkey	67.21	31.96
United Arab Emirates	17.83	80.79
United Kingdom	47.60	50.01
United States	19.20	79.73
Uruguay	59.13	38.11
Venezuela	18.77	80.19
Vietnam	53.84	38.46
Source: Registraduria

== Aftermath ==
Hernández called Petro to congratulate him on his victory. He also encouraged Petro to remain committed to the "anti-corruption discourse". Hernández and Marelen Castillo also thanked Colombians that voted for them. Castillo announced shortly after the election that she would accept a seat in the chamber of representatives reserved for the second-place vice presidential candidate. She also encouraged Hernández to take a senate seat, although he was still to decide. On 23 June, Hernández announced that he would become a senator. President Iván Duque called Petro to congratulate him; he also pledged to carry out a smooth transition.

=== International state reactions ===
- Argentina: President Alberto Fernández and Vice President Cristina Fernández de Kirchner both congratulated Petro and Márquez. President Fernández added that "[their] victory reafirms democracy and reasures the path toward a united Latin America".
- Brazil: President Jair Bolsonaro did not congratulate Petro following his victory and criticized a speech by Petro where he advocated for the release of detained protestors. Bolsonaro used the speech to criticize left-wing opponent Luiz Inácio Lula da Silva, stating: "Did you see today's speech by the new president of Colombia? 'Release all the boys in prison, everyone'. Lula is going to release the little boys who killed someone for a cell phone to have a beer."
- Canada: Prime Minister Justin Trudeau congratulated Petro and Márquez, noting that the latter was "the first Afro-Colombian to take on the role". Trudeau also added that he is "looking forward to working with both on priorities like democracy, gender equality, and climate action".
- Chile: President Gabriel Boric congratulated Petro and called his victory "joy" for Latin America. Boric also congratulated Márquez and invited Petro to "work together for the unity of [Latin America] in a rapidly changing world."
- China: President Xi Jinping sent a congratulatory message to Petro, stating that the relationship between Colombia and China is at "a new starting point," expressed his willingness to work with Petro to "deepen mutual political trust," "practical cooperation" and "work on the further development of bilateral relations." Petro, via his Twitter account "thanked the President of China for his words, assuring "a productive relationship between Colombia and China based on overcoming the climate crisis and building fair and decarbonised economies."
- Costa Rica: President Rodrigo Chaves Robles posted on Twitter, "congratulations to the President-elect of Colombia, Mr Gustavo Petro and his Vice-President Ms Francia Márquez, for [their] triumph, in a democratic and free process. Our best wishes to the Colombian people, with whom we wish a magnificent relationship."
- Dominican Republic: President Luis Abinader congratulated Petro on Twitter and praised the "civility shown on this day that supports democracy" and credited the electoral authorities for ensuring the election was "organised and peaceful".
- Cuba: President Miguel Díaz-Canel congratulated Petro and posted on Twitter, "I express my fraternal congratulations to Gustavo Petro on his election as President of Colombia in a historic popular victory". Díaz-Canel also expressed interest in expanding bilateral relations between Colombia and Cuba. The Cuban foreign minister, Bruno Rodríguez Parrilla, also congratulated Petro. Rodríguez described the electoral triumph as a significant win for upholding peace in Colombia.
- Ecuador: President Guillermo Lasso called Petro to congratulate him. Lasso said he looked forward to strengthening "friendship...cooperation [and] development" between Colombia and Ecuador.
- European Union: The High Representative for Foreign Affairs Josep Borrell congratulated Petro, saying that "Colombia is a key partner for the EU" and that the president-elect can "count on the European Union" to continue strengthening their partnership. He also added that the Colombian election was "a vote for political change and a more egalitarian and inclusive society".
- Haiti: Acting President Ariel Henry congratulated Petro and Márquez via Twitter and wrote, "I would like to extend my sincere congratulations to Mr Gustavo Petro on his victory in the presidential elections in Colombia. I wish you success, as well as your vice-president, Ms Francia Márquez."
- Honduras: President Xiomara Castro posted on Twitter, "On behalf of the people of Honduras, I congratulate the brave people of Colombia for choosing the historic social change represented today by President-elect Gustavo Petro."
- Mexico: President Andrés Manuel López Obrador described Petro's victory as a "historic event" and that it bought about an end to a period of "domination." Obrador also characterised Petro's triumph as a win for the "progressive bloc".
- Panama: In a social media post, President Laurentino Cortizo stated, "On behalf of Panama, I congratulate the president-elect of Colombia, Gustavo Petro, on his arrival at the Casa de Nariño."
- Paraguay: President Mario Abdo Benítez congratulated Petro on Twitter, writing, "Our congratulations to Gustavo Petro as the new president-elect of the Republic of Colombia and to the brotherly Colombian people for this exemplary election day that reaffirms their democratic commitment."
- Peru: President Pedro Castillo said he spoke with Petro to congratulate him on his "historic democratic victory", adding that he and Petro are "united by a common feeling that seeks collective, social and regional integration improvements for our peoples"
- Sahrawi Arab Democratic Republic: President Brahim Ghali expressed his congratulations to Petro for his election. Ghali also stated that "His election and the actual development of the elections constitute further proof of the strength of Colombian democracy".
- Spain: Prime Minister Pedro Sánchez expressed his "best wishes" for Petro and Márquez. He also assured, "We will continue to strengthen the ties that unite us".
- United States: Secretary of State Antony Blinken spoke with Petro to congratulate him on his election and discuss collaboration on issues such as "climate change, improv[ing] public health, and advanc[ing] inclusive economic opportunity". Blinken also noted "U.S. support for full implementation of Colombia's commitments under the 2016 Peace Accord". President Joe Biden also spoke with Petro to congratulate him. Biden noted that he "looks forward to working with the President-elect to continue strengthening bilateral cooperation, including on climate change, health security, and implementation of the 2016 Peace Accord" and discussed "bilateral security and counternarcotics cooperation". They also "agreed to have their teams follow up and engage directly on shared interests".
- Uruguay: President Luis Lacalle Pou called Petro to congratulate him. The Uruguayan ministry of foreign affairs wished Petro "success in his future management" and applauded the "exemplary electoral process".
- Venezuela: President Nicolás Maduro congratulated Petro on his victory, saying: "I congratulate Gustavo Petro and Francia Marquez, for the historic victory in the presidential elections in Colombia. The will of the Colombian people was heard, who came out to defend the path of democracy and peace. New times are on the horizon for this brother country."

=== Other international reactions ===
Peruvian writer, politician, and Nobel laureate Mario Vargas Llosa declared "[Colombians] voted wrong, let's see how Petro acts." Ron DeSantis, the Republican Governor of Florida, denounced Petro as a "former narco-terrorist and a Marxist" whose victory is going to be "disastrous" for Colombia. In the United Kingdom, former Leader of the Labour Party, Jeremy Corbyn, praised Petro's victory as proof of the "power of community organising to build a popular policy platform to heal the divisions of the past and bring about social justice".

== See also ==
- 2022 Colombian parliamentary election
- Pink tide
