= Marelen Castillo =

Colombian politician

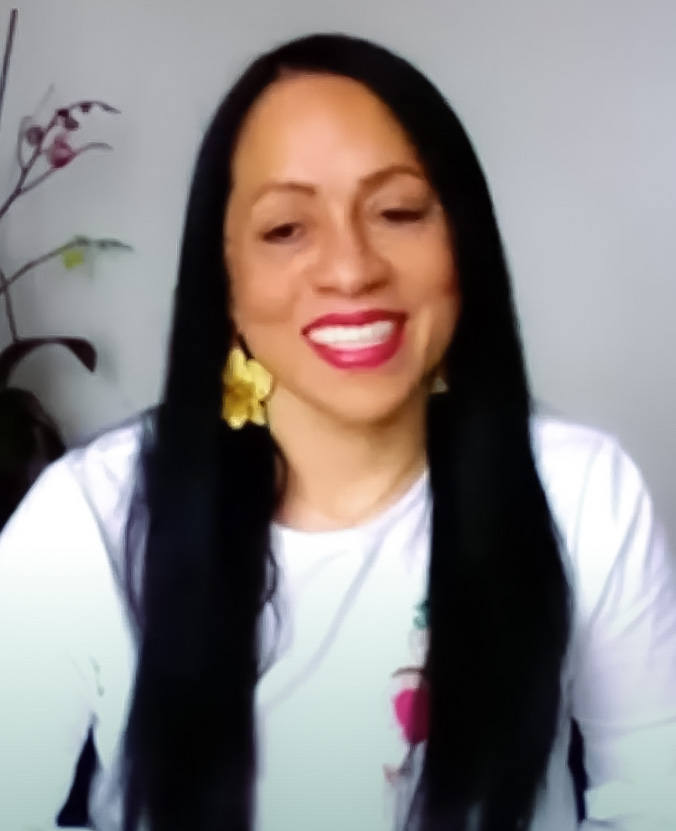
- Castillo in 2022

Member of the Chamber of Representatives
- Incumbent
- Assumed office 20 July 2022 (Note: Declared elected as the vice presidential runner up in the 2022 Colombian presidential election)
- Preceded by: Ángela Robledo

Personal details
- Born: Marlen Castillo Torres; 30 August 1968 (age 57) Cali, Colombia
- Party: Democratic Centre (since 2025)
- Other political affiliations: League of Anti-Corruption Governors (2021–2023); Independent (2023–2025)
- Spouse: Wilson Sánchez (m. 1994)
- Children: 2

Marelen Castillo Torres (born 30 August 1968) is a Colombian teacher, biology and chemistry graduate, industrial engineer, and researcher. She is a member of the Chamber of Representatives of Colombia.

== Early life and education ==
Castillo was born in the La Base neighborhood of Comuna 8 in Cali, the eldest of five sisters. Her mother is a seamstress and Afro-Colombian from Buenaventura (Valle del Cauca), and her father was a public official of the Regional Autonomous Corporation of Valle del Cauca. Raised in a Catholic family, she is a practicing Catholic and a member of the Formation Center for New Evangelization and Catechesis (CEFNEC). She married Wilson Sánchez in 1994 and her son Wilson Andrés was born in 1998. Her daughter María Camila was born in 2000.

Castillo studied at the Nuestra Señora del Pilar school, then from 1987 to 1992 Castillo earned a degree in biology and chemistry at the Santiago de Cali University. From 1995 to 2000 she studied industrial engineering at the Autonomous University of the West, obtaining an engineering degree in 2001. From 2005 to 2007 she studied at the Monterrey Institute of Technology and Higher Education, earning a master's degree in business administration and management. From 2013 to 2016 she studied at Nova Southeastern University in Florida in the United States, graduating in 2017 with a doctorate in education with an emphasis on Organizational Leadership-Education and Administrative Management. She is a Woman For Boards at EGADE Business School of the Technological of Monterey.

== Career ==
In 1990 Castillo began her work as a teacher and taught biology at the Colegio Nuestra Señora del Pilar. She worked there for 11 years and also taught chemistry at the Colegio Mayor Santiago de Cali, an institution of the Archdiocese of Cali.

From 2001 to 2006, Castillo worked at the Lumen Gentium Catholic University Foundation as a teacher, dean and vice-chancellor and acting rector. She also worked at the IU Digital University of Antioquia where she has been an Academic Par and educational consultant. In 2007 she moved to Bogotá, and from 2009 to 2021 she worked at the Minuto de Dios University Corporation as a researcher, director of strategic initiatives, and academic vice-chancellor. In 2011 she became the virtual and distance rector. She is a doctoral professor at Nova Southeastern University.

== 2022 vice presidential candidacy ==
In March 2022, when Castillo was Academic Vice Chancellor of Uniminuto, she agreed to be the vice-presidential candidate for Rodolfo Hernández Suárez, replacing Paola Ochoa who resigned. Castillo had no prior experience in politics. Three months before the presidential elections, she said "Rodolfo was looking for a vice president. As none of the businessmen she contacted accepted her proposal, and a journalist rejected it. So Rodolfo asked for resumes from his staff, and I sent mine on the advice of a friend." The campaign was carried out with the endorsement of the citizens group League of Anti-Corruption Governors, and in the first round they achieved second place in voting with almost six million votes, advancing to the second round held on 19 June. Castillo and Hernández were defeated in the runoff.

Following the election, Castillo announced that she would accept a seat in the Chamber of Representatives, reserved for the vice-presidential runner-up. Castillo, along with all members of Congress, was sworn in on 20 July.

== Publications ==
Castillo is the author and co-author of several articles and texts related to virtual and distance education, as well as learning environments, such as:

- Quality guidelines for verifying the quality conditions of virtual and distance programs. - Author;
- Guidelines for application, granting and renewal of qualified registration. - Co-author.

== Notes ==
Party political offices
Preceded by Paola Ochoa; Withdrew	LIGA nominee for Vice President of Colombia; 2022	Most recent
