= Sergio Fajardo =

Colombian politician and mathematician (born 1956)

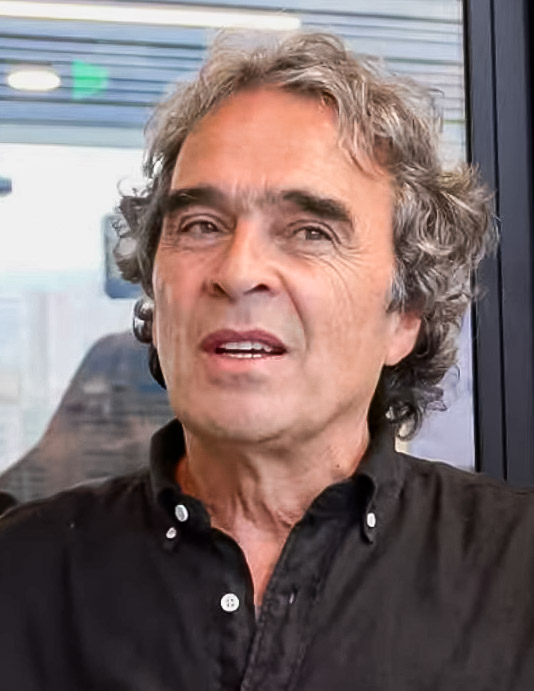
- Fajardo in 2025

Governor of Antioquia
- In office 1 January 2012 – 1 January 2016
- Preceded by: Luis Alfredo Ramos
- Succeeded by: Luis Pérez Gutiérrez

Mayor of Medellín
- In office 1 January 2004 – 1 January 2008
- Preceded by: Luis Pérez Gutiérrez
- Succeeded by: Alonso Salazar Jaramillo

Personal details
- Born: Sergio Fajardo Valderrama; 19 June 1956 (age 70) Medellín, Colombia
- Party: Dignity and Commitment
- Other political affiliations: Green Alliance (2010–2015); Hope Center Coalition
- Parent: Raúl Fajardo Moreno (father)
- Education: University of the Andes; University of Wisconsin, Madison

Sergio Fajardo Valderrama (Spanish pronunciation: [ˈseɾxjo faˈxaɾðo βaldeˈrama]; born 19 June 1956) is a Colombian politician and mathematician. He first entered politics in 2003 when he was elected Mayor of Medellín, the second largest city in Colombia and the capital of Antioquia. He was the mayor of Medellín from 2003 to 2007 and was recognized for transforming the city from a violent and impoverished place to a model of social and urban development. Fajardo was the vice presidential nominee of Antanas Mockus in 2010, finishing in second place after losing the runoff against Juan Manuel Santos and Angelino Garzon. Fajardo served as the governor of Antioquia from 2012 to 2016. Fajardo brands himself as a pragmatic politician with no particular ideology, with political analysts and media outlets in Colombia labelling him as a centrist politician not tied to the traditional parties in Colombia.

In July 2017, Fajardo announced his campaign to run for president in the upcoming elections in 2018. During the 2018 Colombian presidential election, Fajardo finished third in the first round. In March 2022, Fajardo announced that he would begin his presidential campaign for the 2022 Colombian presidential election. He finished fourth in the first round.

== Early life and education ==
Fajardo was born and raised in Medellín, Colombia on 19 June 1956. His father is Raúl Fajardo Moreno, an architect who designed the Coltejer Building. He graduated high school from the Colegio Benedictino and then moved to Bogotá to receive an undergraduate and a graduate degree (M.Sc.) in mathematics from the Universidad de los Andes. Fajardo later went to the United States for his doctorate degree, and earned a Ph.D. in mathematics from the University of Wisconsin-Madison.

== Career ==
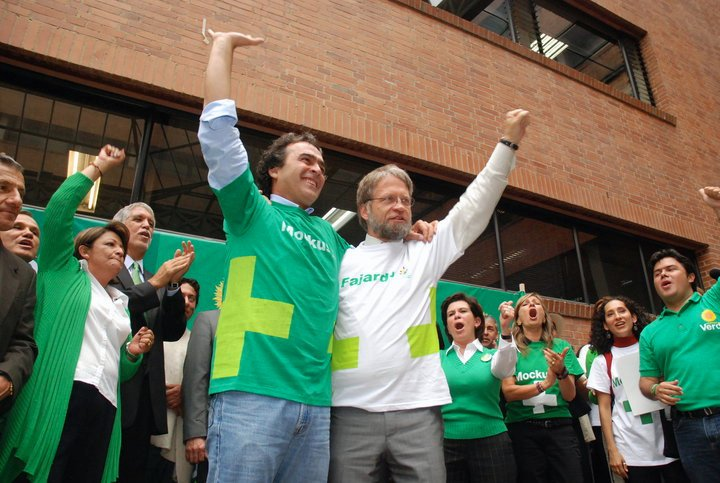
Fajardo with Antanas Mockus.

Before entering politics at age 40, Fajardo taught mathematical logic at the University of the Andes.

=== 2003–2007: Mayor of Medellín ===
In 2003, Fajardo was elected as the first independent mayor of Medellín. During his four-year administration, he led a significant transformation of the city from one of violence and corruption to a city of urban development, for which he was named Best Mayor of Colombia in 2007 and received other national and international awards.

=== 2010–2015: Vice presidential nominee and governor of Antioquia ===
In 2010, Fajardo was vice presidential candidate with the also independent politician and mathematician Antanas Mockus. From 2012 to 2015, he was elected governor of the state of Antioquia. During his administration, Antioquia experienced the best national performance in open government, transparency, and investment of oil royalties according to the National Planning Department and the Anti corruption Office of Colombia. He was named the best governor of the country in 2015 by the organization Colombia Líder.

=== 2018–2022: Presidential candidate ===
Fajardo launched his independent presidential candidacy in 2018, which was supported by the Coalición Colombia, made up of the Green Party, the Polo Democrático and his movement, Compromiso Ciudadano. In the first round of elections, Fajardo obtained more than 4.6 million votes, only 1.5% away from passing to the second round. In 2021, Fajardo faced embezzlement charges for allowing a $98 million loan contract to be denominated in dollars during his governance of Antioquia. According to LatinNews, the charge was seen as politically motivated.

=== 2022–present ===
Currently, Fajardo is professor at the School of Government and Public Transformation of the Instituto Tecnológico of Monterrey in Mexico. A member of the Inter-American Dialogue, Fajardo intends to represent a Third Way inspired by former British Prime Minister Tony Blair to overcome the traditional divide on the left–right political spectrum. The Colombian Communist Party accused Fajardo of trying to perpetuate the Colombian neoliberal system under the guise of moderation and pragmatism.

== Personal life ==
Fajardo is married and has two children.

== Publications ==
- Fajardo, S., Keisler, H.J. (2002), Model Theory of Stochastic Processes. Lecture Notes in Logic. Association for Symbolic Logic. A.K.Peters, Natick, MA. ISBN 1-56881-172-1.
- Fajardo, S. (2007), Medellín del miedo a la esperanza. Alcaldía de Medellín.
- Fajardo, S. (2017), El poder de la decencia. Editorial Planeta.

Political offices
Preceded by Luis Pérez Gutiérrez	Mayor of Medellín; 2004–2008	Succeeded by Alonso Salazar Jaramillo
Preceded by Luis Alfredo Ramos	Governor of Antioquia; 2012–2016	Succeeded by Luis Perez
Party political offices
First	Green Party nominee for Vice President of Colombia; 2010	Succeeded by Isabel Segovia
Preceded by Humberto De la Calle	Independent Social Alliance nominee for President of Colombia; 2022	Most recent
New alliance	Hope Center nominee for President of Colombia; 2022	Most recent
