= Team for Colombia =

Team for Colombia Equipo por Colombia
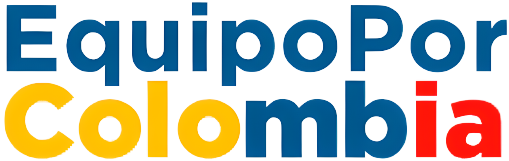
- Founded: 29 October 2021
- Dissolved: 29 May 2022
- Ideology: Conservatism; Economic liberalism Conservative liberalism
- Political position: Centre-right to right-wing

Team for Colombia (Spanish: Equipo por Colombia), popularly known as the Experience Coalition or Coalition of the Regions, was a centre-right and right-wing political coalition in Colombia. It was formed in October 2021 for participation in the 2022 Colombian presidential election with Federico Gutiérrez as candidate. The coalition was dissolved in May 2022.

== Composition ==
=== Members ===
Party	Abbr.	Leader	Main ideology
We Believe Colombia; Creemos Colombia	Creemos	Federico Gutiérrez	Conservative liberalism
Land of Opportunities; País de Oportunidades	País	Alejandro Char	Conservative liberalism
Colombian Conservative Party; Partido Conservador	PCC	Omar Yepes	Conservatism
MIRA; Partido MIRA	MIRA	Carlos Eduardo Guevara	Miraism
Party of the U Partido de la U	La U	Dilian Francisca Toro	Liberalism

=== Support ===
Party	Abbr.	Leader	Main ideology
Colombian Liberal Party; Partido Liberal	PLC	César Gaviria	Social liberalism
Democratic Center; Centro Democrático	CD	Álvaro Uribe	Social conservatism, Right-wing populism
Radical Change; Cambio Radical	CR	Jorge Enrique Vélez	Conservative liberalism
