= Hope Center Coalition =

Hope Center Coalition Coalición Centro Esperanza
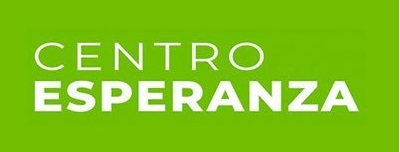
- Founded: 9 June 2021
- Dissolved: 30 July 2022
- Ideology: Social democracy Green politics Liberalism; Social liberalism
- Political position: Centre
- Seats in the Chamber of Representatives: 4 / 188
- Seats in the Senate: 13 / 108

Website
- coalicioncentroesperanza.com

The Hope Center Coalition (Spanish: Coalición Centro Esperanza), previously the Coalition of Hope (Coalición de la Esperanza), was a political and electoral coalition in Colombia composed of political parties and social movements of the centre. According to them, they will work under four programmatic guidelines, which are to regain confidence in democracy, put the economy at the service of citizens, take care of biodiversity and protect citizens and territories.

== Electoral history ==
=== Presidential elections ===
Election Year	Candidate	Running mate	First Round		Second Round		Result
Election Year	Candidate	Running mate	Votes	Percentage	Votes	Percentage	Result
2022	Sergio Fajardo	Luis Gilberto Murillo	885,291 (#4)	4.18			Lost

=== Legislative elections ===
Election Year	House of Representatives			Senate		
Election Year	Votes	Percentage	Seats	Votes	Percentage	Seats
2022	882,725	6,67 (#7)	13 / 188	1,958,369	11,5 (#4)	13 / 108
