= Conservatism in Colombia =

Colombian Conservatism (Spanish: Conservadurismo) is a system of conservative political beliefs in Colombia that is characterized by protectionism, support of Catholic values, social stability and anti-totalitarianism.

Its history began with the creation of two conservative political parties in Colombia. One characteristic of the Colombian Conservatism, in contrast to many other geographic subsets of conservatism, is its strong emphasis on protectionism, which is considered by many Colombian conservatives to be necessary to create a fair market.

== History ==
Colombian conservatism holds Simón Bolívar and his ideals as central to its political principles. The first formal conservative Colombian party, known as "Republicanos Moderados" (Moderate Republicans) was created in 1837 by Jose Ignacio de Marquez. In the image of Bolivar, the party held to religious principles and favored order and control. In 1840, a civil war occurred that caused the proliferation of future political parties, including the Colombian Conservative Party, the current principal representative of this Bolivarian ideal.

Colombia has experienced many conservative movements. An example is the "Conservatismo Colombiano" party.

Other movements, such as that of Gustavo Rojas Pinilla, were also influenced by conservative ideals.

Another important movement, created by Nuñez, was a coalition between conservatives and moderate liberals called "Partido Nacional" (National Party).

The National Popular Alliance was established in the 1960s by disillusioned conservatives, and it later developed into a populist opposition party. Before the creation of the party, the members were called "Godos". These "Republicanos Moderados" and some other "radical conservatives" led to the beginnings of the Colombian Conservative Party.

== Ideals ==
These ideals have evolved, but the most important are:

- Protectionism
- Family traditions
- Catholic Church
- Private property
- Support for Colombia as a nation
- Individual rights
- Social stability

== Conservative presidents ==
Conservative presidents include:

- José Ignacio de Márquez
- Pedro Alcántara Herrán
- Rufino Cuervo Barreto
- Manuel María Mallarino
- Mariano Ospina Rodríguez
- Bartolomé Calvo
- Rafael Núñez (*)
- Carlos Holguín Mallarino
- Miguel Antonio Caro
- Manuel Antonio Sanclemente
- José Manuel Marroquín
- Rafael Reyes
- Ramón González Valencia
- Carlos Restrepo
- José Vicente Concha
- Marco Fidel Suárez
- Jorge Holguín Mallarino
- Pedro Nel Ospina Vásquez
- Miguel Avadía Méndez
- Mariano Ospina Pérez
- Laureano Gómez
- Roberto Urdaneta Arbeláez
- Guillermo León Valencia
- Misael Pastrana Borrero
- Belisario Betancur Cuartas
- Andrés Pastrana Arango
- Álvaro Uribe Vélez (*)
- Ivan Duque

(*) Presidents of Liberal origin that implemented conservative policies, who have since then become allied with conservatism.
