= Rodolfo Hernández Suárez =

Colombian politician (1945–2024)

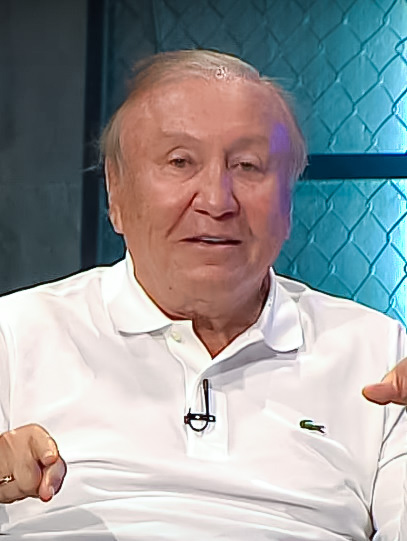
- Hernández Suárez in 2020

President of the League of Anti-Corruption Governors
- In office 4 August 2022 – 2 September 2024
- Preceded by: Office established

Senator of Colombia
- In office 20 July 2022 – 25 October 2022 (Note: Declared elected as the presidential runner up in the 2022 Colombian presidential election)

Mayor of Bucaramanga
- In office 1 January 2016 – 10 September 2019
- Preceded by: Luis Francisco Bohórquez
- Succeeded by: Juan Carlos Cárdenas Rey

Personal details
- Born: Rodolfo Hernández Suárez; 26 March 1945 Piedecuesta, Santander, Colombia
- Died: 2 September 2024 (aged 79) Piedecuesta, Santander, Colombia
- Party: League of Anti-Corruption Governors (2022–2024)
- Other political affiliations: Liberal Party (1992–1995)
- Spouse: Socorro Oliveros (m. 1972)
- Children: 4 (Note: One daughter is presumably deceased)
- Education: National University of Colombia

Rodolfo Hernández Suárez (26 March 1945 – 2 September 2024) was a Colombian politician, civil engineer, and businessman who served as a senator of Colombia from July to October 2022. He was mayor of Bucaramanga from 2016 until his resignation in 2019. As the nominee for the League of Anti-Corruption Governors (LIGA) coalition, Hernández placed second in the first round of the 2022 Colombian presidential election, and he was ultimately defeated by Gustavo Petro in the second round run-off election. Hernández briefly served in a senate seat offered to the runner-up in a presidential election and took office on 20 July and resigned in October that same year.

After his defeat, Hernández applied for LIGA to be granted legal party status by the National Electoral Council. LIGA became a party on 4 August 2022 and Hernández became the party's president. He was the owner of the company Constructora HG.

In late 2023, Hernández Suárez began campaigning for Governor of Santander and was diagnosed with cancer. In June 2024, he was sentenced to house arrest due to influencing a business contract that benefited his son during his time as mayor. Hernández Suárez died of cancer in September 2024.

== Early life ==
Hernández was born in Piedecuesta, department of Santander, in 1945, and was raised in nearby Bucaramanga. His father was kidnapped and held for 135 days by the Revolutionary Armed Forces of Colombia (FARC-EP) several years before Hernández Suárez's political career began.

Prior to his entry into politics, he was a civil engineer from 1971 following his graduation from the National University of Colombia, and worked a career in the construction industry as an entrepreneur through the 1990s via his company HG Constructora, mainly focusing on affordable housing in Bucaramanga and the surrounding area, earning over US$100 million.

== Political career ==
Hernández entered politics and was first a member of the Colombian Liberal Party. He served as a local councilor for Piedecuesta from 1990 to 1992. In 2011, he financed and campaigned for Lucho Bohórquez, a member of the Colombian Liberal Party, who ended up winning the mayoral election of Bucaramanga.

=== Mayoralty of Bucaramanga (2015–2019) ===
Hernández ran for mayor of Bucaramanga in 2015, financing his own campaign and winning the mayoral election. He served as mayor of Bucaramanga from 2016 to 2019. As mayor, he became known nationally for weekly Facebook broadcasts in which he answered questions from citizens, and for his public fights with city councilors which he accused of being thieving "rats". He also received recognition by giving his salary to public university students. On different occasions, he met with community leaders and youth leaders. In 2018, he was suspended for three months for slapping a councilor. In 2019, the Office of the Attorney General sanctioned him for alleged improper participation in politics while holding the mayoral office, which Hernández responded to by resigning from the position. During his tenure, he became known as a campaigner against corruption, and when he left office, he had an approval rating of 84%. He also faced a judicial process for alleged irregularities in the execution of a consulting contract to implement new technologies for waste management in the El Carrasco landfill, which he would have incurred as mayor of Bucaramanga.

Hernández has previously caused controversy among the Venezuelan expat community in the country after stating Venezuelan women were often "baby factories" who would need to be supported by the state. He also caused controversy, when he said, during a 2016 interview, "I am a follower of a great German thinker, named Adolf Hitler." He later apologized and said he meant to say Albert Einstein.

== 2022 presidential campaign ==
The run-off results of the 2022 Colombian presidential election

Hernández declared his candidacy in 2022 as an independent, with Marelen Castillo as his running-mate. He finished second in the first round of the 2022 presidential elections with 28% of the vote, advancing to a runoff on 19 June 2022, facing Gustavo Petro. After the first round, Hernández expressed gratitude to everyone who voted for him, saying; "To those who voted for me, I tell you now, I won't fail you." He received the backing of the third-placed candidate Federico Gutiérrez, for the second round, urging voters "to keep Petro out".

He campaigned against the corruption of the traditional political class and emphasized his image as a successful entrepreneur who can transform Colombia. He promised to "clean" the country of corruption. He also promised "major budget cuts," eliminating the use of presidential planes and helicopters and donating all the money he would receive as president. He said he would give financial rewards to citizens who report corrupt state officials. He pledged to strengthen law and order and create jobs. He additionally praised President of Mexico Andrés Manuel López Obrador during the campaign for his "anti-corruption efforts." He intended to improve the country's prison infrastructure and would have restructured the National Penitentiary and Prison Institute, expressing zero tolerance for crime. He said that in terms of decent housing, he would close the housing deficit in rural and urban areas. He was dubbed as the 'king of TikTok' on several occasions because of his large following and his extensive campaign during the 2022 presidential election on TikTok.

Hernández lost to Petro in the second round. In his concession speech, Hernández stated, "I accept the result as it should be if we want our institutions to be strong. I sincerely hope that this decision that has been taken is beneficial for all and that Colombia is heading towards the change that prevailed in the vote in the first round". He then called Petro to congratulate him and urged Petro to maintain his commitment to combatting corruption and not to "disappoint those who trust him".

== Post-presidential campaign ==
=== Senator (2022) ===
On 23 June, Hernández accepted a senate seat offered to the runner-up in a presidential election. However, he indicated his intention to seek office in Santander in 2023 and suggested that his senate tenure may last for no more than a few months. He, along with all members of Congress, were sworn in on 20 July. Hernández claimed his presence in the senate was like having Lionel Messi as a goalkeeper. However, he resigned from the upper house on 25 October, saying that the position was "not right" for him. His departure fueled speculation that he intended to run for the governorship of Santander; Hernández also spoke about potentially running for mayor in a city in his home department.

=== Party status of LIGA ===
On 19 July 2022, Hernández submitted a request to the National Electoral Council (CNE) to grant LIGA legal status as a political party. In the application, Hernández emphasised coming second place in the presidential election as the LIGA nominee and mentioned that he and his running mate Castillo had taken their respective seats in the senate and chamber of representatives awarded to the runner-up ticket. He also referred to the convention held by LIGA, which declared its opposition to the coalition government of Gustavo Petro. The CNE granted LIGA party status on 4 August, the same day, Hernández assumed the role of the party's president. He subsequently appointed his wife, Socorro Oliveros as the national director of LIGA.

=== Legal issues ===
In early 2024, Hernández Suárez faced legal proceedings over business dealings during his tenure as Bucaramanga mayor. In June 2024, a judge sentenced Hernández Suárez to five years in prison for influencing a multimillion dollar sanitation contract towards a company led by his son during his tenure as mayor. Hernández Suárez refuted the ruling and vowed to make an appeal. However, he was sentenced to house arrest due to his health issues and frequent hospitalizations.

== Personal life ==
Hernández Suárez married Socorro Oliveros in 1972. They had four children; two of whom were adopted. His daughter, Juliana, was kidnapped and presumably killed by the National Liberation Army (ELN) in 2004. Hernández Suárez had refused to pay the ransom, arguing it would put the rest of his family at a higher risk of kidnapping.

== Illness and death ==
In late 2023, Hernández Suárez was diagnosed with colon cancer while running for Governor of Santander and would undergo chemotherapy. In March 2024, while undergoing judicial proceedings, he announced that the cancer was terminal. Two months later in May, Hernández Suárez was hospitalized due to abdominal pains in Bucaramanga and would begin treatment at his home.

Hernández Suárez died at a hospital in Piedecuesta on 2 September 2024 from surgical complications to remove cancer cells in his liver. He was 79 years old. At the time of his death, he had been hospitalized for two months while undergoing cancer treatment and his colon cancer had metastasized to his liver. During his treatment, Hernández Suárez had a hepatectomy and was experiencing liver failure.

President Gustavo Petro, former running mate Marelen Castillo, Minister of the Interior Juan Fernando Cristo and former Bogota Mayor Claudia López issued condolences on social media following his death.

His remains were cremated and a funeral was held in Bucaramanga on 4 September.

== Political positions ==
Hernández stated that he was neither on the political right nor the left. Nevertheless, several scholars and analysts have characterized him as far-right. Ana Lucía Magrini described him as a "controversial far-right candidate", while Julián Andrés Escobar Gómez described him as one of the leading representatives of the Colombian far right and stated that "part of his political message could be confused with fascism". Enrique Arias and Jo-Marie Burt included Hernández among the figures embodying contemporary extreme-right politics in Latin America, and Daniel C. Hallin, Philip Kitzberger, and Manel Palos-Pons described him as a "far-right populist leader". Marinana Andrade e Barros likewise included him among examples of the rise of extreme-right forces in Latin America, citing Arias and Burt. Hernández was also one of the cases examined in a comparative report on the digital radical right in Latin America. Santiago Vargas Acevedo's doctoral thesis at the University of Cambridge described Hernández as an "alt-right Trump-like millionaire and TikTok prodigy with an anti-politics rhetoric". Filipe Albino Ferreira included Hernández among the examples of political forces associated with the rise of contemporary proto-fascism, alongside the National Rally, Golden Dawn, Ukraine’s Right Sector and José Antonio Kast. He described these forces as “clearly proto-fascist, racist, xenophobic and anti-communist”. Mariano Fraschini also examines Hernández as part of the rise of far-right leadership in South America, comparing him with Jair Bolsonaro and José Antonio Kast. He also notes differences between the three, particularly Hernández’s positions on gender and civil liberties and the more ideologically heterogeneous nature of his support base. Despite these differences, in the chapter’s conclusion, Franchini describes their electoral projects as promoting an “extreme-right discourse” and identifies neoliberalism and anti-statist rhetoric as common features. However, this classification has been disputed. In the chapter "Colombia: Seeds of the Far Right", Sandra Botero and José Miguel Jaimes Prada argued that characterizing Hernández as a representative of the contemporary far right was misleading. They described him as a populist without a fully developed ideological program, whose eclectic policy positions did not fall squarely on either the right or the left. They also argued that, unlike several contemporary far-right leaders in Latin America, he did not make nativism, opposition to LGBTQ+ rights, or a militarized response to the armed conflict central to his presidential campaign. While other analysts struggled to label him. Patricia Muñoz, a political analyst at Pontifical Xavierian University, evaluated Hernández's political positions as syncretic, saying; "If you had to place him on an ideological spectrum, most would say he's centre-right or right-wing, but when you look at his proposals, they're eclectic." He was described as a populist and compared to Donald Trump and Silvio Berlusconi because he emphasized his image as a successful businessman who could transform Colombia and often used obscene language against the political establishment of his country.

Hernández declared that he was in favor of same-sex marriage, adoption of children by same-sex couples, legalization of medical and recreational marijuana, euthanasia and assisted suicide. Regarding abortion, he assured that in an eventual government of his the right to abortion would be totally respected and affirmed that "it is the woman's decision whether to have an abortion or not". He supported lowering the value-added tax from 19% to 10%, as well as a basic income for all senior citizens regardless of past contributions or lack thereof, and potentially those near or below the poverty line. He also supported progressively writing off debt for students in the lower classes, known as estrato 1 and 2, while also including active students, and those with the best grades. He pledged increased access to higher education in the regions; universal health care; switching from a punitive to a rehabilitative attitude towards drug addiction; granting Olympians and world record holders from Colombia state pensions; increasing social payments for successful sportspeople to up to 100,000 pesos per day; a 50% quota for women in public service and the presidential cabinet; welfare payments for those that maintain and take care of forested areas; as well as limiting fracking unless it meets environmental conditions. Likewise, he came to propose increasing the working hours to 10 hours and reducing the time off work. Regarding the Colombian peace process, he stated that he would fully implement the FARC peace deal and expressed willingness to add an addendum to the FARC peace deal to include the National Liberation Army. He was in favour of restoring consular relations with Venezuela to address the violence on the border, saying; "Consular relations are necessary for good circulation, both commercial and touristic, and also because the border is where the increase in violence that Colombia is experiencing is also most felt."

== Notes ==
Political offices
Preceded by Luis Francisco Bohórquez	Mayor of Bucaramanga; 2016–2019	Succeeded by Juan Carlos Cárdenas Rey
Party political offices
New political alliance	League of Anti-Corruption Governors nominee for President of Colombia; 2022	Most recent
New political party	President of the League of Anti-Corruption Governors; 2022–2024	Vacant
