= Elections in Colombia =

Elections in Colombia are regulated and controlled by the National Electoral Council (CNE) which also provides information on elections and election results.

At the national level, the President of Colombia is elected as the head of state and the bicameral Congress of Colombia as the legislature every four years. The Congress of Colombia is composed of 162 members of the Chamber of Representatives and 102 members of the Senate. Both are elected by proportional representation.

Colombia historically had a two-party system, dominated by the Colombian Liberal Party and Colombian Conservative Party, in which it could be difficult for third parties to find success. Since the implementation of the 1991 constitution, there has been a proliferation of third parties, which have won most presidential elections in the 21st century.

Colombia's electoral system has a pervasive corruption issue, with electoral fraud, bribery, and other scandals occurring at both the municipal and national levels.

== Electoral system ==
=== Presidential ===
Colombian presidents are elected for four-year terms using a two-round system; if no candidate receives a majority of the vote in the first round, a runoff is held between the top two candidates. The vice president is elected on the same ticket as the president. Presidents are limited to a single four-year term, and Article 191 of the constitution requires candidates to be Colombian by birth and at least thirty years old. In line with the constitution, Colombian citizens by birth or by naturalization, aged eighteen or older have the right to vote. Several scenarios can cause the loss of the right to vote, as outlined in the constitution. Citizens in detention centers can vote from the establishments determined by the National Civil Registry. The civil registry inscription is not automatic, and citizens must go to the regional office of the registry to register. Legislative Act No. 2 of 2015 established that the runner-up in the presidential elections is given a seat in the Senate and their vice president candidate becomes a member of the Chamber of Representatives.

In order to be accepted as a candidate, applicants must either have the backing of a recognized political party in order to run as their official candidate, or to collect a minimum number of signatures in order to run as an independent candidate.

== Schedule ==
Presidential and parliamentary elections are held every four years in Colombia.

== Latest elections ==
=== 2026 presidential election ===
| Candidate | Running mate | Party | First round | | Second round | |
| Candidate | Running mate | Party | Votes | % | Votes | % |
|---|---|---|---|---|---|---|
| Abelardo de la Espriella | José Manuel Restrepo | Independent (Note: Received support from the National Salvation Movement.) | 10,361,499 | 43.75 | 12,959,542 | 49.66 |
| Iván Cepeda | Aida Quilcué | Historic Pact | 9,688,361 | 40.90 | 12,708,712 | 48.70 |
| Paloma Valencia | Juan Daniel Oviedo | Democratic Centre | 1,639,685 | 6.92 | | |
| Sergio Fajardo | Edna Bonilla | Dignity and Commitment | 1,009,073 | 4.26 | | |
| Claudia López | Leonardo Huerta | Independent | 225,517 | 0.95 | | |
| Santiago Botero Jaramillo | Carlos Cuevas | Independent | 206,140 | 0.87 | | |
| Mauricio Lizcano | Pedro de la Torre | Independent | 53,839 | 0.23 | | |
| Miguel Uribe Londoño | Luisa Fernanda Villegas | Colombian Democratic Party | 28,657 | 0.12 | | |
| Sondra Macollins Garvin | Leonardo Karam Helo | Independent | 19,889 | 0.08 | | |
| Roy Barreras | Martha Zamora | The Force | 14,108 | 0.06 | | |
| Luis Gilberto Murillo | Luz María Zapata | Independent | 13,270 | 0.06 | | |
| Carlos Caicedo | Nelson Alacrón | Independent | 12,694 | 0.05 | | |
| Gustavo Matamoros Camacho | Mila Paz | Colombian Ecologist Party | 5,627 | 0.02 | | |
| Blank votes | | | 406,970 | 1.72 | 426,848 | 1.64 |
| Total | | | 23,685,329 | 100.00 | 26,095,102 | 100.00 |
| Valid votes | | | 23,685,329 | 98.78 | 26,095,102 | 99.05 |
| Invalid votes | | | 292,975 | 1.22 | 250,262 | 0.95 |
| Total votes | | | 23,978,304 | 100.00 | 26,345,364 | 100.00 |
| Registered voters/turnout | | | 41,421,973 | 57.89 | 41,421,973 | 63.60 |
Source: Registraduria (Round 1) Registraduria (Round 2)

=== 2026 parliamentary election ===
==== Senate ====
Senado de Colombia 2026–2030
| Party | Votes | % | Seats |
|---|---|---|---|
| Historic Pact | 4,471,238 | 22.95 | 25 |
| Democratic Centre | 3,072,702 | 15.77 | 17 |
| Colombian Liberal Party | 2,276,223 | 11.68 | 13 |
| Alliance for Colombia (Note: A coalition of Green Alliance, En Marcha, Colombian Democratic Party, Colombia Renaciente, and Independent Social Alliance) | 1,905,680 | 9.78 | 10 |
| Colombian Conservative Party | 1,853,403 | 9.51 | 10 |
| Party of the U | 1,554,812 | 7.98 | 9 |
| Radical Change–ALMA Coalition (Note: A coalition of Radical Change, LIGA, Colombia Justa Libres, and Broad Democratic Alliance) | 1,241,509 | 6.37 | 7 |
| Colombia Now (Note: A coalition of MIRA, New Liberalism, and Dignity and Compromise) | 891,907 | 4.58 | 5 |
| National Salvation Movement | 707,764 | 3.63 | 4 |
| Frente Amplio Unitario (Note: A coalition of La Fuerza, Partido Ecologista Colombiano, Democratic Hope, Partido del Trabajo de Colombia, and Movimiento Alternativo Indígena y Social) | 396,042 | 2.03 | 0 |
| Creemos Colombia | 227,957 | 1.17 | 0 |
| Coalición Fuerza Ciudadana | 114,722 | 0.59 | 0 |
| Con Toda por Colombia | 105,393 | 0.54 | 0 |
| Oxygen Party | 27,879 | 0.14 | 0 |
| Patriots | 10,755 | 0.06 | 0 |
| Secure and Prosperous Colombia | 10,754 | 0.06 | 0 |
| Blank votes | 616,998 | 3.17 | – |
| Total | 19,485,738 | 100.00 | 100 |
| Valid votes | 19,485,738 | 94.80 | |
| Invalid votes | 1,069,091 | 5.20 | |
| Total votes | 20,554,829 | 100.00 | |
| Registered voters/turnout | 41,287,084 | 49.79 | |
Indigenous seats
| Indigenous and Social Alternative Movement | 88,294 | 29.05 | 1 |
| Indigenous Authorities of Colombia | 72,927 | 23.99 | 1 |
| Unity in Minga Movement for Colombia | 56,060 | 18.44 | 0 |
| Association of Traditional Indigenous Authorities | 16,628 | 5.47 | 0 |
| Yes Movement | 3,001 | 0.99 | 0 |
| Association of Indigenous Councils for Colombia | 2,644 | 0.87 | 0 |
| National Indigenous Association of Colombia | 2,434 | 0.80 | 0 |
| Tevis Indigenous Council | 1,413 | 0.46 | 0 |
| ACMIZSAM | 1,067 | 0.35 | 0 |
| Trietnico Gobernativo Trigo | 972 | 0.32 | 0 |
| Blank votes | 58,539 | 19.26 | – |
| Total | 303,979 | 100.00 | 2 |
| Valid votes | 303,979 | 74.44 | |
| Invalid/blank votes | 104,357 | 25.56 | |
| Total votes | 408,336 | 100.00 | |
Source: RTVC

==== Chamber of Representatives ====
| Party | Votes | % | Seats |
|---|---|---|---|
| Historic Pact | 3,880,148 | 20.63 | 36 |
| Colombian Liberal Party | 2,103,122 | 11.18 | 25 |
| Democratic Centre | 2,527,214 | 13.44 | 24 |
| Colombian Conservative Party | 1,957,004 | 10.41 | 18 |
| Party of the U | 1,043,537 | 5.55 | 11 |
| Radical Change | 806,205 | 4.29 | 9 |
| Green Alliance | 654,197 | 3.48 | 4 |
| National Salvation Movement | 410,416 | 2.18 | 1 |
| Democratic Centre–MIRA | 356,437 | 1.90 | 3 |
| Pr1mero Córdoba (CoR–MIRA) | 340,337 | 1.81 | 2 |
| Creemos Colombia | 285,637 | 1.52 | 2 |
| Ahora Colombia (MIRA–NL–D&C) | 263,954 | 1.40 | 1 |
| Historic Pact–Green Alliance | 213,128 | 1.13 | 4 |
| Coalición Liberal Colombia Reborn | 145,370 | 0.77 | 1 |
| La Fuerza | 140,092 | 0.74 | 1 |
| New Liberalism | 133,652 | 0.71 | 0 |
| MIRA–Dignity and Commitment | 121,489 | 0.65 | 0 |
| CR–LAU–MSN–OXI | 118,097 | 0.63 | 1 |
| Green Alliance–En Marcha | 112,328 | 0.60 | 1 |
| Colombian Democratic Party | 106,553 | 0.57 | 1 |
| Pacto Histórico – Frente Amplio (PH–MAIS) | 100,288 | 0.53 | 1 |
| Avancemos Nariño (Green Alliance–AICO) | 99,820 | 0.53 | 1 |
| Bogotá entre todos (CR–LIGA–CJL–PUG–PVO–ASI) | 96,155 | 0.51 | 0 |
| CR–CJL–LIGA de Gobernantes | 96,135 | 0.51 | 1 |
| Pacto Histórico Sucre Unitarios (PH–MAIS–PTC) | 84,870 | 0.45 | 0 |
| Coalición Fuerza Ciudadana | 84,861 | 0.45 | 0 |
| Coalición Demócrata Amplia por la Paz (PDC–LF–ADA) | 84,298 | 0.45 | 1 |
| Coalición Green Alliance–En Marcha–ASI | 79,449 | 0.42 | 0 |
| Pacto por Risaralda (PH–MAIS–ED) | 74,621 | 0.40 | 1 |
| Con Toda por Bogotá | 74,131 | 0.39 | 0 |
| Coalición Green–En Marcha–La Fuerza | 71,357 | 0.38 | 0 |
| Party of the U–Radical Change | 70,122 | 0.37 | 1 |
| Colombian Conservative Party–National Salvation Movement | 64,368 | 0.34 | 1 |
| Democratic Centre–Colombian Conservative Party | 64,054 | 0.34 | 1 |
| Independent Social Alliance | 65,315 | 0.35 | 2 |
| Fuerza Cauca (CoR–MIRA–Green Alliance) | 60,317 | 0.32 | 1 |
| Party of the U–Partido Ecologista Colombiano | 56,958 | 0.30 | 0 |
| Democratic Centre–New Liberalism–MIRA | 53,334 | 0.28 | 0 |
| CR–ASI–CJL | 52,325 | 0.28 | 0 |
| Party of the U–MIRA–National Salvation Movement–ADA | 51,175 | 0.27 | 0 |
| Democratic Centre–Party of the U | 49,172 | 0.26 | 1 |
| Salvation–ALMA (LIGA–CJL–ADA)–Oxygen | 48,046 | 0.26 | 0 |
| Party of the U–En Marcha | 46,987 | 0.25 | 0 |
| Motociclistas y Conductores Unidos por la Causa | 45,089 | 0.24 | 0 |
| Alianza por Nariño (MIRA–LF) | 44,612 | 0.24 | 0 |
| Ahora Colombia Caldas (MIRA–NL–D&C–CoR) | 43,484 | 0.23 | 0 |
| SUMA (PUG–Green Alliance–NL–MIRA) | 41,301 | 0.22 | 0 |
| Radical Change–New Liberalism | 39,756 | 0.21 | 0 |
| Esperanza Chocó (PC–MAIS) | 36,994 | 0.20 | 0 |
| ALMA (LIGA–CJL–ADA) | 36,107 | 0.19 | 0 |
| Avanza (LF–PDC–CoR) | 35,609 | 0.19 | 0 |
| Broad Unitary Front | 34,885 | 0.19 | 0 |
| Party of the U–MIRA | 33,627 | 0.18 | 0 |
| Coalición Caquetá (NL–ASI–Green Alliance) | 33,367 | 0.18 | 1 |
| Revive Caquetá 20 (CR–MIRA) | 30,284 | 0.16 | 1 |
| Putumayo También es Colombia | 27,686 | 0.15 | 1 |
| Dignity and Commitment | 25,472 | 0.14 | 0 |
| Ciudadanos Renovemos | 23,036 | 0.12 | 0 |
| La Fuerza–Indigenous and Social Alternative Movement | 22,089 | 0.12 | 0 |
| Coalición AV–ASI–PUG–PTC | 20,081 | 0.11 | 0 |
| Putumayo Nos Une | 19,841 | 0.11 | 0 |
| Colombia Justa Libres | 19,605 | 0.10 | 0 |
| ALMA (LIGA–CJL) | 19,262 | 0.10 | 0 |
| Por Risaralda (PC–CoR–ASI) | 16,747 | 0.09 | 0 |
| Independent Movement of Absolute Renovation | 16,179 | 0.09 | 0 |
| La Voz del Amazonas (MAIS–CoR) | 12,406 | 0.07 | 1 |
| League of Anti-Corruption Governors | 8,710 | 0.05 | 0 |
| Party of the U–MIRA–New Liberalism | 7,957 | 0.04 | 0 |
| ABC Alianza Bogotá Convergente | 7,943 | 0.04 | 0 |
| ALMA (LIGA–CJL–ADA)–Radical Change | 7,889 | 0.04 | 0 |
| Democratic Hope | 7,658 | 0.04 | 0 |
| Oxygen Party | 7,450 | 0.04 | 0 |
| Movement of Indigenous Authorities of Colombia | 7,419 | 0.04 | 0 |
| Frente Amplio del Cesar (AV–EM–PEC) | 6,747 | 0.04 | 0 |
| Movimiento Agrario Colombiano | 5,303 | 0.03 | 0 |
| Partido Ecologista Colombiano | 4,520 | 0.02 | 0 |
| ALMA (LIGA–CJL–ADA)–Oxygen | 4,324 | 0.02 | 0 |
| Coalición Alianza Córdoba | 3,936 | 0.02 | 0 |
| Indigenous and Social Alternative Movement | 3,246 | 0.02 | 0 |
| Pacto Frente Amplio (PDC–ED–EM) | 2,947 | 0.02 | 0 |
| En Marcha | 2,867 | 0.02 | 0 |
| MIRA–Dignity and Commitment–Colombian Democratic Party | 2,716 | 0.01 | 0 |
| Pacto Green Guaviare (AV–PH–MAIS) | 1,976 | 0.01 | 0 |
| Fuerza Tolima | 1,722 | 0.01 | 0 |
| Colombia Reborn | 1,511 | 0.01 | 0 |
| Frente Amplio Risaralda (PEC–LF) | 908 | 0.00 | 0 |
| Pacto Histórico Unitario – Vichada (PH–PTC) | 856 | 0.00 | 0 |
| Workers' Party of Colombia | 719 | 0.00 | 0 |
| Broad Democratic Alliance | 533 | 0.00 | 0 |
| Blank votes | 681,007 | 3.62 | – |
| Total | 18,805,458 | 100.00 | 161 |
| Valid votes | 18,805,458 | 94.96 | |
| Invalid votes | 998,975 | 5.04 | |
| Total votes | 19,804,433 | 100.00 | |
| Registered voters/turnout | 41,287,084 | 47.97 | |
Source: Registraduría

== See also ==
- Corruption in Colombia
- Electoral calendar
- Electoral system
- Government of Colombia
