= Politics of Colombia =

Colombia is a presidential representative democratic republic with a multi-party system, where the President of Colombia is both head of state and head of government. The national government has separate executive, legislative, and judicial branches. The legislative power is held by the two chambers of the Congress of Colombia, the Senate and the Chamber of Representatives. The judiciary is independent of the executive and the legislature, with the four high courts for each jurisdiction of law: the Constitutional Court of Colombia, Supreme Court of Justice of Colombia, Council of State, and Superior Council of Judicature.

The Economist Intelligence Unit rated Colombia a "flawed democracy" in 2024.

== Constitution ==
The current Colombian Constitution of 1991, enacted on July 5, 1991, strengthened the administration of justice with the provision for introduction of an adversarial system, which entirely replaced the existing Napoleonic Code. Other significant reforms under the new constitution included civil divorce, dual nationality, the office of Vice President of Colombia, and the election of Departmental Governors. Additionally, the constitution expanded citizens' fundamental rights, including the right of "tutela," which allows individuals to request immediate court action if they feel their constitutional rights are being violated and if no other legal recourse is available.

== Executive branch ==
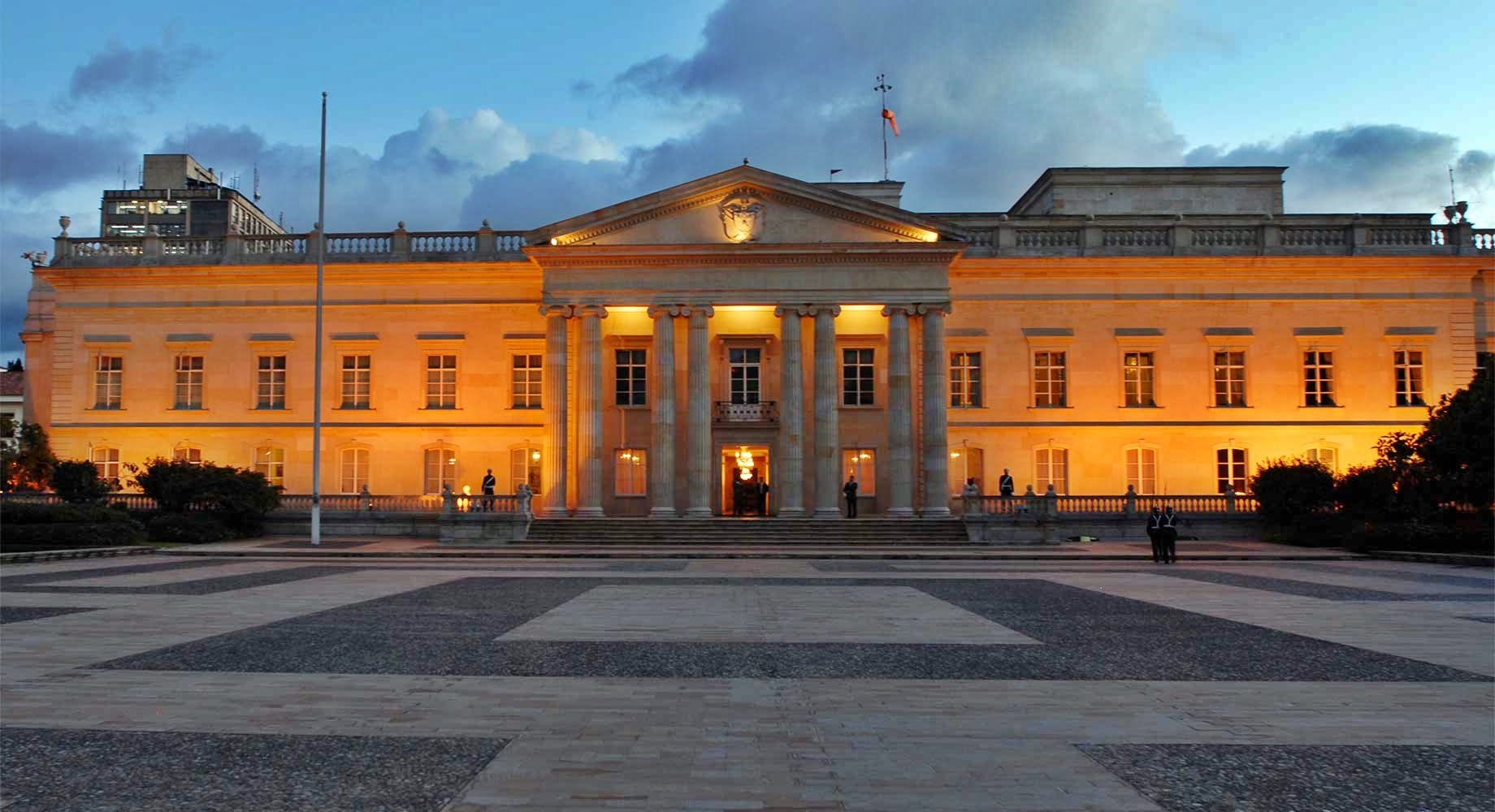
Casa de Nariño, seat of the executive power.

The President of Colombia is elected to a single four-year term. The 1991 constitution reestablished the position of the Vice President of Colombia, who is elected on the same ticket as the president. By law, the vice president will succeed in the event of the president's resignation, illness, or death. Since 2015, the president has been barred from running for reelection, even for a nonconsecutive term.

== Legislative branch ==
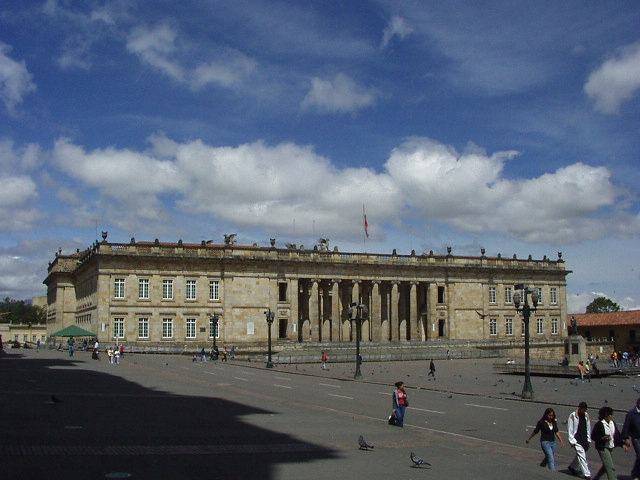
Congress of Colombia in Bogotá.

Colombia's bicameral congress consists of a 108-member senate and a 172-member chamber of representatives. Senators are elected on the basis of a nationwide ballot, while representatives are elected in multi member districts co-located within the 32 national departments. The country's capital is a separate capital district and elects its own representatives. Members may be re-elected indefinitely, and, in contrast to the pre-1991 constitution system, there are no alternate congressmen. Congress meets twice a year, and the president has the power to call it into special session when needed.

== Judicial branch ==
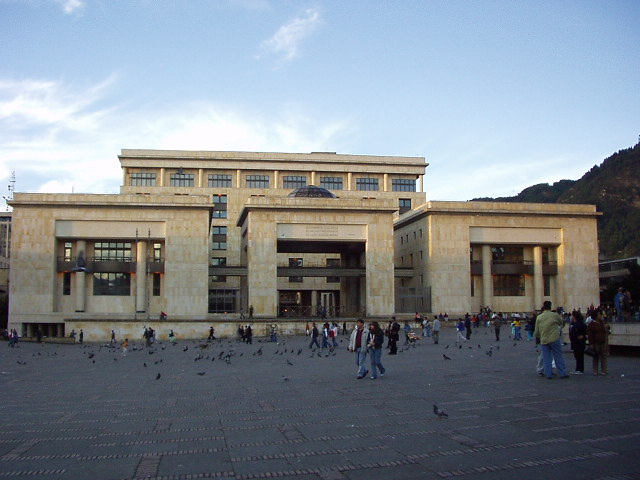
Supreme Court of Justice of Colombia.

The civilian judiciary is a separate and independent branch of government. Guidelines and the general structure for Colombia's administration of justice are set out in Law 270 of March 7, 1996. After the 1991 Constitution, Colombia's legal system began incorporating elements of an oral, accusatory system. The judicial branch's general structure comprises four distinct jurisdictions: ordinary, administrative, constitutional, and special. Colombia's highest judicial organs are the Supreme Court, the Council of State, the Constitutional Court, and the Superior Judicial Council. Although all the high courts technically oversee separate jurisdictions, the Constitutional Court has a broad spectrum of judicial oversight, often allowing it to rule on issues overseen by different jurisdictions and even weigh in directly on the rulings of other high courts.

== Elections ==
=== Presidential ===
Colombian presidents are elected for four-year terms using a two-round system; if no candidate receives a majority of the vote in the first round, a runoff is held between the top two candidates. The vice president is elected on the same ticket as the president. Presidents are limited to a single four-year term, and Article 191 of the constitution requires candidates to be Colombian by birth and at least thirty years old. In line with the constitution, Colombian citizens by birth or by naturalization, aged eighteen or older have the right to vote. Several scenarios can cause the loss of the right to vote, as outlined in the constitution. Citizens in detention centers can vote from the establishments determined by the National Civil Registry. The civil registry inscription is not automatic, and citizens must go to the regional office of the registry to register. Legislative Act No. 2 of 2015 established that the runner-up in the presidential elections is given a seat in the Senate and their vice president candidate becomes a member of the Chamber of Representatives.

In order to be accepted as a candidate, applicants must either have the backing of a recognized political party in order to run as their official candidate, or to collect a minimum number of signatures in order to run as an independent candidate.

=== Recent elections ===
Main article: 2026 Colombian presidential election

==== 2022 presidential election ====
Candidate	Running mate	Party	First round		Second round	
Candidate	Running mate	Party	Votes	%	Votes	%
Gustavo Petro	Francia Márquez (SPS)	Humane Colombia	8,542,020	40.34	11,292,758	50.42
Rodolfo Hernández	Marelen Castillo	Independent	5,965,531	28.17	10,604,656	47.35
Federico Gutiérrez	Rodrigo Lara Sánchez	Creemos Colombia	5,069,526	23.94		
Sergio Fajardo	Luis Gilberto Murillo (CR)	Independent Social Alliance	885,291	4.18		
John Milton Rodríguez	Sandra de las Lajas Torres	Colombia Justa Libres	271,386	1.28		
Enrique Gómez Martínez	Carlos Cuartas	National Salvation Movement	48,643	0.23		
Íngrid Betancourt (Note: Withdrew before election but appeared on ballot)	José Luis Esparza	Oxygen Green Party	14,161	0.07		
Luis Pérez Gutiérrez	Ceferino Mosquera	Independent	11,507	0.05		
Blank votes			365,777	1.73	500,069	2.23
Total			21,173,842	100.00	22,397,483	100.00
Valid votes			21,173,842	98.75	22,397,483	98.72
Invalid votes			268,458	1.25	291,551	1.28
Total votes			21,442,300	100.00	22,689,034	100.00
Registered voters/turnout			39,002,239	54.98	39,002,239	58.17
Source: Registraduria

==== 2026 parliamentary election ====
===== Senate =====
Senado de Colombia 2026–2030
Party	Votes	%	Seats
Historic Pact	4,471,238	22.95	25
Democratic Centre	3,072,702	15.77	17
Colombian Liberal Party	2,276,223	11.68	13
Alliance for Colombia (Note: A coalition of Green Alliance, En Marcha, Colombian Democratic Party, Colombia Renaciente, and Independent Social Alliance)	1,905,680	9.78	11
Colombian Conservative Party	1,853,403	9.51	10
Party of the U	1,554,812	7.98	8
Radical Change–ALMA Coalition (Note: A coalition of Radical Change, LIGA, Colombia Justa Libres, and Broad Democratic Alliance)	1,241,509	6.37	7
Colombia Now (Note: A coalition of MIRA, New Liberalism, and Dignity and Compromise)	891,907	4.58	5
National Salvation Movement	707,764	3.63	4
Frente Amplio Unitario (Note: A coalition of La Fuerza, Partido Ecologista Colombiano, Democratic Hope, Partido del Trabajo de Colombia, and Movimiento Alternativo Indígena y Social)	396,042	2.03	0
Creemos Colombia	227,957	1.17	0
Coalición Fuerza Ciudadana	114,722	0.59	0
Con Toda por Colombia	105,393	0.54	0
Oxygen Party	27,879	0.14	0
Patriots	10,755	0.06	0
Secure and Prosperous Colombia	10,754	0.06	0
Blank votes	616,998	3.17	–
Total	19,485,738	100.00	100
Valid votes	19,485,738	94.80	
Invalid votes	1,069,091	5.20	
Total votes	20,554,829	100.00	
Registered voters/turnout	41,287,084	49.79	
Indigenous seats
Indigenous and Social Alternative Movement	88,294	29.05	1
Indigenous Authorities of Colombia	72,927	23.99	1
Unity in Minga Movement for Colombia	56,060	18.44	0
Association of Traditional Indigenous Authorities	16,628	5.47	0
Yes Movement	3,001	0.99	0
Association of Indigenous Councils for Colombia	2,644	0.87	0
National Indigenous Association of Colombia	2,434	0.80	0
Tevis Indigenous Council	1,413	0.46	0
ACMIZSAM	1,067	0.35	0
Trietnico Gobernativo Trigo	972	0.32	0
Blank votes	58,539	19.26	–
Total	303,979	100.00	2
Valid votes	303,979	74.44	
Invalid/blank votes	104,357	25.56	
Total votes	408,336	100.00	
Source: RTVC

===== Chamber of Representatives =====
Party	Votes	%	Seats
Historic Pact	3,880,148	20.63	36
Colombian Liberal Party	2,103,122	11.18	25
Democratic Centre	2,527,214	13.44	24
Colombian Conservative Party	1,957,004	10.41	18
Party of the U	1,043,537	5.55	11
Radical Change	806,205	4.29	9
Green Alliance	654,197	3.48	4
National Salvation Movement	410,416	2.18	1
Democratic Centre–MIRA	356,437	1.90	3
Pr1mero Córdoba (CoR–MIRA)	340,337	1.81	2
Creemos Colombia	285,637	1.52	2
Ahora Colombia (MIRA–NL–D&C)	263,954	1.40	1
Historic Pact–Green Alliance	213,128	1.13	4
Coalición Liberal Colombia Reborn	145,370	0.77	1
La Fuerza	140,092	0.74	1
New Liberalism	133,652	0.71	0
MIRA–Dignity and Commitment	121,489	0.65	0
CR–LAU–MSN–OXI	118,097	0.63	1
Green Alliance–En Marcha	112,328	0.60	1
Colombian Democratic Party	106,553	0.57	1
Pacto Histórico – Frente Amplio (PH–MAIS)	100,288	0.53	1
Avancemos Nariño (Green Alliance–AICO)	99,820	0.53	1
Bogotá entre todos (CR–LIGA–CJL–PUG–PVO–ASI)	96,155	0.51	0
CR–CJL–LIGA de Gobernantes	96,135	0.51	1
Pacto Histórico Sucre Unitarios (PH–MAIS–PTC)	84,870	0.45	0
Coalición Fuerza Ciudadana	84,861	0.45	0
Coalición Demócrata Amplia por la Paz (PDC–LF–ADA)	84,298	0.45	1
Coalición Green Alliance–En Marcha–ASI	79,449	0.42	0
Pacto por Risaralda (PH–MAIS–ED)	74,621	0.40	1
Con Toda por Bogotá	74,131	0.39	0
Coalición Green–En Marcha–La Fuerza	71,357	0.38	0
Party of the U–Radical Change	70,122	0.37	1
Colombian Conservative Party–National Salvation Movement	64,368	0.34	1
Democratic Centre–Colombian Conservative Party	64,054	0.34	1
Independent Social Alliance	65,315	0.35	2
Fuerza Cauca (CoR–MIRA–Green Alliance)	60,317	0.32	1
Party of the U–Partido Ecologista Colombiano	56,958	0.30	0
Democratic Centre–New Liberalism–MIRA	53,334	0.28	0
CR–ASI–CJL	52,325	0.28	0
Party of the U–MIRA–National Salvation Movement–ADA	51,175	0.27	0
Democratic Centre–Party of the U	49,172	0.26	1
Salvation–ALMA (LIGA–CJL–ADA)–Oxygen	48,046	0.26	0
Party of the U–En Marcha	46,987	0.25	0
Motociclistas y Conductores Unidos por la Causa	45,089	0.24	0
Alianza por Nariño (MIRA–LF)	44,612	0.24	0
Ahora Colombia Caldas (MIRA–NL–D&C–CoR)	43,484	0.23	0
SUMA (PUG–Green Alliance–NL–MIRA)	41,301	0.22	0
Radical Change–New Liberalism	39,756	0.21	0
Esperanza Chocó (PC–MAIS)	36,994	0.20	0
ALMA (LIGA–CJL–ADA)	36,107	0.19	0
Avanza (LF–PDC–CoR)	35,609	0.19	0
Broad Unitary Front	34,885	0.19	0
Party of the U–MIRA	33,627	0.18	0
Coalición Caquetá (NL–ASI–Green Alliance)	33,367	0.18	1
Revive Caquetá 20 (CR–MIRA)	30,284	0.16	1
Putumayo También es Colombia	27,686	0.15	1
Dignity and Commitment	25,472	0.14	0
Ciudadanos Renovemos	23,036	0.12	0
La Fuerza–Indigenous and Social Alternative Movement	22,089	0.12	0
Coalición AV–ASI–PUG–PTC	20,081	0.11	0
Putumayo Nos Une	19,841	0.11	0
Colombia Justa Libres	19,605	0.10	0
ALMA (LIGA–CJL)	19,262	0.10	0
Por Risaralda (PC–CoR–ASI)	16,747	0.09	0
Independent Movement of Absolute Renovation	16,179	0.09	0
La Voz del Amazonas (MAIS–CoR)	12,406	0.07	1
League of Anti-Corruption Governors	8,710	0.05	0
Party of the U–MIRA–New Liberalism	7,957	0.04	0
ABC Alianza Bogotá Convergente	7,943	0.04	0
ALMA (LIGA–CJL–ADA)–Radical Change	7,889	0.04	0
Democratic Hope	7,658	0.04	0
Oxygen Party	7,450	0.04	0
Movement of Indigenous Authorities of Colombia	7,419	0.04	0
Frente Amplio del Cesar (AV–EM–PEC)	6,747	0.04	0
Movimiento Agrario Colombiano	5,303	0.03	0
Partido Ecologista Colombiano	4,520	0.02	0
ALMA (LIGA–CJL–ADA)–Oxygen	4,324	0.02	0
Coalición Alianza Córdoba	3,936	0.02	0
Indigenous and Social Alternative Movement	3,246	0.02	0
Pacto Frente Amplio (PDC–ED–EM)	2,947	0.02	0
En Marcha	2,867	0.02	0
MIRA–Dignity and Commitment–Colombian Democratic Party	2,716	0.01	0
Pacto Green Guaviare (AV–PH–MAIS)	1,976	0.01	0
Fuerza Tolima	1,722	0.01	0
Colombia Reborn	1,511	0.01	0
Frente Amplio Risaralda (PEC–LF)	908	0.00	0
Pacto Histórico Unitario – Vichada (PH–PTC)	856	0.00	0
Workers' Party of Colombia	719	0.00	0
Broad Democratic Alliance	533	0.00	0
Blank votes	681,007	3.62	–
Total	18,805,458	100.00	161
Valid votes	18,805,458	94.96	
Invalid votes	998,975	5.04	
Total votes	19,804,433	100.00	
Registered voters/turnout	41,287,084	47.97	
Source: Registraduría

== Political parties ==
In the parliamentary election of 2022, the following parties got the minimum required number of votes for legal recognition (3% of valid votes).

== International organization participation ==
=== Global ===
United Nations

- FAO
- IAEA
- ICAO
- ITUC
- IFAD
- ILO
- IMF
- IMO
- IOM
- ITU
- UNASUR
- UNCTAD
- UNESCO
- UNHCR
- UNIDO
- UPU
- WHO
- WIPO
- WMO
- WToO

World Bank

- IDA
- IBRD
- IFC
- MIGA

Other

- G-24
- G-77
- ICC
- ICCt
- ICRM
- IFRCS
- IHO
- Interpol
- IOC
- ISO
- NAM
- OPCW
- PCA
- WCO
- WFTU
- WTO
- OECD

=== Regional ===
- BCIE
- CAN
- CDB
- G-3
- IADB
- LAES
- LAIA
- Mercosur (associate)
- OAS
- OPANAL
- RG
