= 2026 Colombian parliamentary election =

- 8 March 2026
- Chamber of Representatives
- 182 of the 183 seats in the Chamber of Representatives; 92 seats needed for a majority
- Turnout: 50.62%
Party	Leader	Vote %	Seats	+/–
Historic Pact	Gustavo Petro	20.63	36	+10
Democratic Centre	Gabriel Vallejo	13.44	24	+8
Liberal	César Gaviria	11.18	23	−9
Conservative	Efraín Cepeda	10.41	18	−7
Party of the U	Dilian Francisca Toro	5.55	12	−3
Radical Change	Germán Vargas Lleras	4.29	9	−7
Green Alliance	Jonathan Ferney Pulido Hernández	3.48	4	−7
PH–AV		1.13	4	0
CD–MIRA		1.90	3	New
CoR–MIRA		1.81	2	New
Creemos	Federico Gutiérrez	1.52	2	New
ASI	Berenice Bedoya	0.35	2	New
National Salvation	Enrique Gómez Martínez	2.18	1	New
MIRA–NL–D&C		1.40	1	New
PLC–CR		0.77	1	New
La Fuerza	Jhon Rojas	0.74	1	New
CR–LAU–MSN–OXI		0.63	1	New
AV–En Marcha		0.60	1	New
PDC	Pedro Adán Torres Pérez	0.57	1	New
PH–MAIS		0.53	1	New
AV–AICO		0.53	1	New
CR–CJL–LIGA		0.51	1	New
PDC–LF–ADA		0.45	1	New
PH–MAIS–ED		0.40	1	New
Party of the U–CR		0.37	1	New
PCC–MSN		0.34	1	New
DC–PCC		0.34	1	New
CoR–MIRA–AV		0.32	1	New
DC–Party of the U		0.26	1	New
NL–ASI–AV		0.18	1	New
CR–MIRA		0.16	1	New
PTC		0.15	1	New
MAIS–CoR		0.07	1	New
Afro-Colombian seats
CCEN		28.85	2	+2
Indigenous seat
MUMC		32.94	1	+1
This lists parties that won seats. See the complete results below.
Results of the election in the Chamber of Representatives.
- Senate
- 102 of the 103 seats in the Senate; 52 seats needed for a majority
- Turnout: 50.62%
Party	Vote %	Seats	+/–
Historic Pact	22.96	25	+5
Democratic Centre	15.77	17	+4
Liberal	11.69	13	−1
Green Alliance	9.78	11	−1
Conservative	9.51	10	−5
Party of the U	7,98	8	−2
Radical Change	6.37	7	−5
Colombia Now	4.58	5	+2
National Salvation	3.63	4	+4
Indigenous seats
MAIS	31.86	1	0
AICO	26.47	1	0
This lists parties that won seats. See the complete results below.

The 2026 Colombian legislative elections were held on Sunday, March 8. They elected the members of both chambers of the Congress of Colombia for the 2026–2030 term, from a total of 3,144 candidates.

The Senate of Colombia held elections for 103 senators: 100 from the national constituency, two from the special indigenous constituency, and one seat reserved for the runner-up in the presidential election.

The Chamber of Representatives held elections for 183 members. Of these, 161 represent the 32 departments and the Capital District, two represent Afro-descendant communities, one represents Indigenous communities, one represents the Raizal people of San Andrés and Providencia, and one represents the international constituency. The remaining seats comprise 16 elected from the Special Transitional Peace Constituencies, a set of 16 districts covering the rural regions most affected by the Colombian armed conflict, in which only victims of the conflict or their accredited community organizations may stand as candidates; and one reserved for the running mate of the second-place ticket in the presidential election.

This was the first election in which the five seats guaranteed to the Commons party in each chamber were no longer in effect, requiring the party to compete on equal footing with the other politically registered groups. Commons lost all five seats.

== Electoral system ==
Of the 183 members of the House of Representatives, 162 are elected by proportional representation from 33 multi-member constituencies based on the departments, with seats allocated using the largest remainder method. Two members are elected by the Afro-Colombian community, one by the Indigenous community, one by Colombian expatriates, 16 for the Development Programs with a Territorial Approach (PDET) through the Special Transitory Peace Constituencies (CITREP) as part of the peace agreements with the FARC-EP; and one for the second highest vice-presidential vote. The 103 Senators are elected by two methods; 100 from a single nationwide constituency by proportional representation (with seats allocated using the largest remainder), two from a two-seat constituency for Indigenous communities, and one for the presidential opposition. Unlike the previous elections in 2018 and 2022, no seats will be reserved for Commons, formerly the disbanded rebel group FARC, in either chamber.

== Security concerns ==
On 20 February 2026, the ELN declared a unilateral ceasefire to allow for the holding of the election. More than 126,000 law enforcement officers were deployed nationwide to secure the election. The campaign period was marred by the killings of more than 60 political and community leaders and figures, including a presidential candidate.

== Monitoring ==
The European Union deployed 40 observers to monitor the election.

== Candidates ==
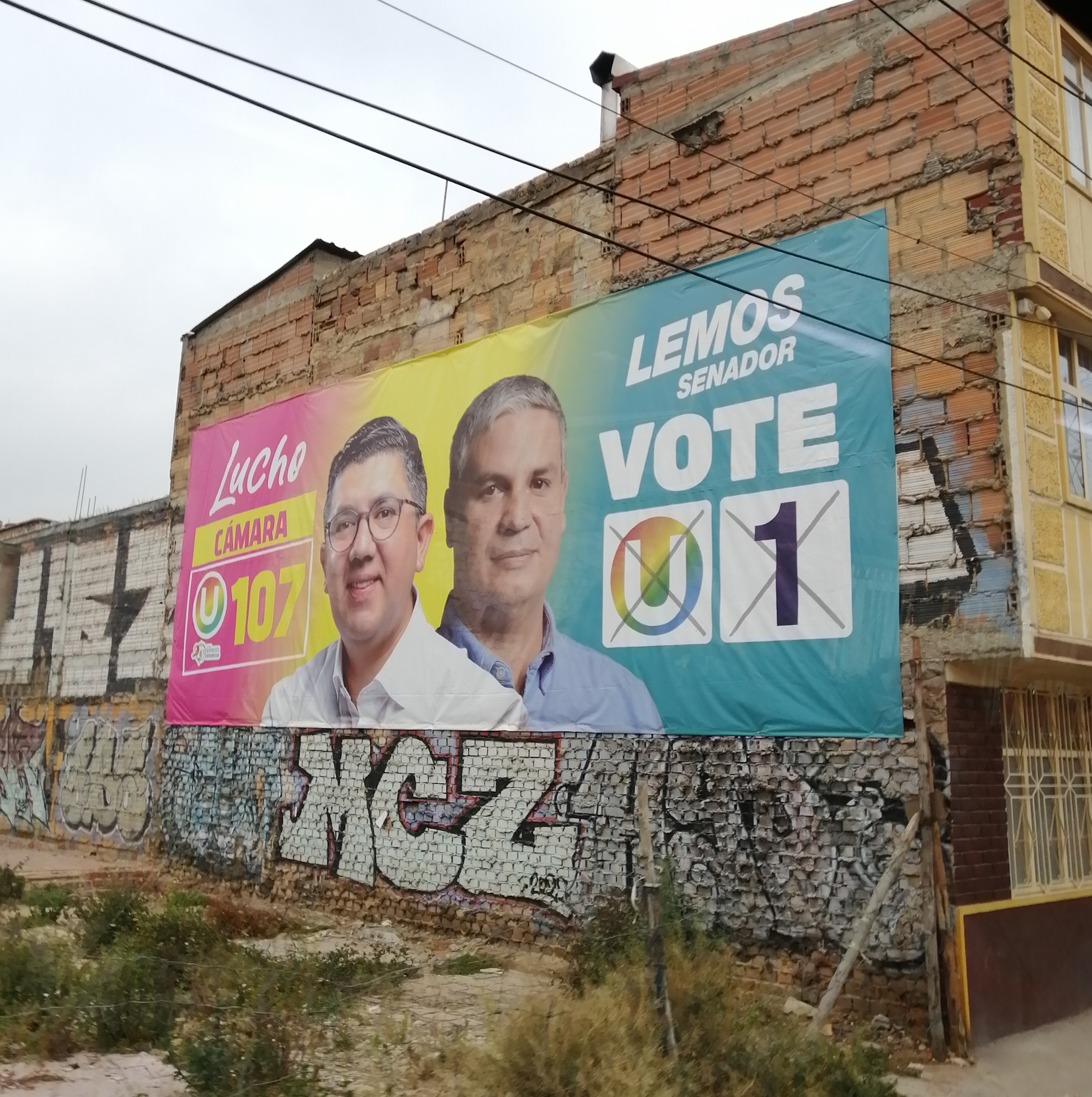
Electoral poster

More than 3,000 candidates were running for 102 seats in the Senate and 183 seats in the House of Representatives.

== Opinion polls ==
Date	Pollster	Sample	Radical Change		Colombian Conservative Party		Colombian Liberal Party	League of Anti-Corruption Governors	Independent Movement of Absolute Renovation	New Liberalism (Colombia)	Historic Pact		Green Alliance (Colombia)	Oxygen Green Party	Union Party for the People	Others	Blank votes	NS/NC	Won't vote
13–16 Jan 2026	GAD3	1207	4.0%	15.0%	2.0%	0.5%	7.0%	0.1%	1.0%	0.3%	23.0%	1.0%	1.0%	0.3%	0.4%	3.0%	6.0%	22.0%	14.0%

=== Senate of the Republic ===
Date	Pollster	Sample	AC	New Liberalism (Colombia)		CR		Colombian Conservative Party					Colombian Liberal Party	Historic Pact			Oxygen Green Party	Union Party for the People	Others	Blank votes	NS/NC
27 Jan–4 Feb 2026	AtlasIntel/Semana	7298	2.0%		6.3%	4.2%	17.8%	7.4%	0.7%	0.2%	0.1%	1.8%	10.1%	21.0%	0.3%	2.5%	0.3%	6.8%	1.8%	3.4%	13.4%
14–22 Jan 2026	Guarumo/EcoAnalítica	4254	2.8%	5.2%	1.7%	2.5%	20.1%	0.5%	5.1%	0.5%	0.2%	0.3%	0.6%	27.1%	0.3%	1.1%	1.4%	4.5%	–	11.3%	14.6%

== Results ==
=== Chamber of Representatives ===
Party	Votes	%	Seats
Historic Pact	3,880,148	20.63	36
Democratic Centre	2,527,214	13.44	24
Colombian Liberal Party	2,103,122	11.18	23
Colombian Conservative Party	1,957,004	10.41	18
Party of the U	1,043,537	5.55	12
Radical Change	806,205	4.29	9
Green Alliance	654,197	3.48	4
National Salvation Movement	410,416	2.18	1
Democratic Centre–MIRA	356,437	1.90	4
Pr1mero Córdoba (CoR–MIRA)	340,337	1.81	2
Creemos Colombia	285,637	1.52	2
Ahora Colombia (MIRA–NL–D&C)	263,954	1.40	1
Historic Pact–Green Alliance	213,128	1.13	4
Coalición Liberal Colombia Reborn	145,370	0.77	1
La Fuerza	140,092	0.74	1
New Liberalism	133,652	0.71	0
MIRA–Dignity and Commitment	121,489	0.65	0
CR–LAU–MSN–OXI	118,097	0.63	1
Green Alliance–En Marcha	112,328	0.60	1
Colombian Democratic Party	106,553	0.57	1
Pacto Histórico – Frente Amplio (PH–MAIS)	100,288	0.53	1
Avancemos Nariño (Green Alliance–AICO)	99,820	0.53	1
Bogotá entre todos (CR–LIGA–CJL–PUG–PVO–ASI)	96,155	0.51	0
CR–CJL–LIGA de Gobernantes	96,135	0.51	1
Pacto Histórico Sucre Unitarios (PH–MAIS–PTC)	84,870	0.45	0
Coalición Fuerza Ciudadana	84,861	0.45	0
Coalición Demócrata Amplia por la Paz (PDC–LF–ADA)	84,298	0.45	1
Coalición Green Alliance–En Marcha–ASI	79,449	0.42	0
Pacto por Risaralda (PH–MAIS–ED)	74,621	0.40	1
Con Toda por Bogotá	74,131	0.39	0
Coalición Green–En Marcha–La Fuerza	71,357	0.38	0
Party of the U–Radical Change	70,122	0.37	1
Colombian Conservative Party–National Salvation Movement	64,368	0.34	1
Democratic Centre–Colombian Conservative Party	64,054	0.34	1
Independent Social Alliance	65,315	0.35	2
Fuerza Cauca (CoR–MIRA–Green Alliance)	60,317	0.32	1
Party of the U–Partido Ecologista Colombiano	56,958	0.30	0
Democratic Centre–New Liberalism–MIRA	53,334	0.28	0
CR–ASI–CJL	52,325	0.28	0
Party of the U–MIRA–National Salvation Movement–ADA	51,175	0.27	0
Democratic Centre–Party of the U	49,172	0.26	1
Salvation–ALMA (LIGA–CJL–ADA)–Oxygen	48,046	0.26	0
Party of the U–En Marcha	46,987	0.25	0
Motociclistas y Conductores Unidos por la Causa	45,089	0.24	0
Alianza por Nariño (MIRA–LF)	44,612	0.24	0
Ahora Colombia Caldas (MIRA–NL–D&C–CoR)	43,484	0.23	0
SUMA (PUG–Green Alliance–NL–MIRA)	41,301	0.22	0
Radical Change–New Liberalism	39,756	0.21	0
Esperanza Chocó (PC–MAIS)	36,994	0.20	0
ALMA (LIGA–CJL–ADA)	36,107	0.19	0
Avanza (LF–PDC–CoR)	35,609	0.19	0
Broad Unitary Front	34,885	0.19	0
Party of the U–MIRA	33,627	0.18	0
Coalición Caquetá (NL–ASI–Green Alliance)	33,367	0.18	1
Revive Caquetá 20 (CR–MIRA)	30,284	0.16	1
Putumayo También es Colombia	27,686	0.15	1
Dignity and Commitment	25,472	0.14	0
Ciudadanos Renovemos	23,036	0.12	0
La Fuerza–Indigenous and Social Alternative Movement	22,089	0.12	0
Coalición AV–ASI–PUG–PTC	20,081	0.11	0
Putumayo Nos Une	19,841	0.11	0
Colombia Justa Libres	19,605	0.10	0
ALMA (LIGA–CJL)	19,262	0.10	0
Por Risaralda (PC–CoR–ASI)	16,747	0.09	0
Independent Movement of Absolute Renovation	16,179	0.09	0
La Voz del Amazonas (MAIS–CoR)	12,406	0.07	1
League of Anti-Corruption Governors	8,710	0.05	0
Party of the U–MIRA–New Liberalism	7,957	0.04	0
ABC Alianza Bogotá Convergente	7,943	0.04	0
ALMA (LIGA–CJL–ADA)–Radical Change	7,889	0.04	0
Democratic Hope	7,658	0.04	0
Oxygen Party	7,450	0.04	0
Movement of Indigenous Authorities of Colombia	7,419	0.04	0
Frente Amplio del Cesar (AV–EM–PEC)	6,747	0.04	0
Movimiento Agrario Colombiano	5,303	0.03	0
Partido Ecologista Colombiano	4,520	0.02	0
ALMA (LIGA–CJL–ADA)–Oxygen	4,324	0.02	0
Coalición Alianza Córdoba	3,936	0.02	0
Indigenous and Social Alternative Movement	3,246	0.02	0
Pacto Frente Amplio (PDC–ED–EM)	2,947	0.02	0
En Marcha	2,867	0.02	0
MIRA–Dignity and Commitment–Colombian Democratic Party	2,716	0.01	0
Pacto Green Guaviare (AV–PH–MAIS)	1,976	0.01	0
Fuerza Tolima	1,722	0.01	0
Colombia Reborn	1,511	0.01	0
Frente Amplio Risaralda (PEC–LF)	908	0.00	0
Pacto Histórico Unitario – Vichada (PH–PTC)	856	0.00	0
Workers' Party of Colombia	719	0.00	0
Broad Democratic Alliance	533	0.00	0
Blank votes	681,007	3.62	–
Total	18,805,458	100.00	161
Valid votes	18,805,458	94.96	
Invalid votes	998,975	5.04	
Total votes	19,804,433	100.00	
Registered voters/turnout	41,287,084	47.97	
Source: Registraduría

=== Senate ===
Senado de Colombia 2026–2030
Party	Votes	%	Seats
Historic Pact	4,472,061	22.96	25
Democratic Centre	3,072,388	15.77	17
Colombian Liberal Party	2,276,614	11.69	13
Alliance for Colombia (Note: A coalition of Green Alliance, En Marcha, Colombian Democratic Party, Colombia Renaciente, and Independent Social Alliance)	1,905,039	9.78	11
Colombian Conservative Party	1,852,354	9.51	10
Party of the U	1,553,639	7.98	8
Radical Change–ALMA Coalition (Note: A coalition of Radical Change, LIGA, Colombia Justa Libres, and Broad Democratic Alliance)	1,241,082	6.37	7
Colombia Now (Note: A coalition of MIRA, New Liberalism, and Dignity and Compromise)	891,755	4.58	5
National Salvation Movement	707,685	3.63	4
Frente Amplio Unitario (Note: A coalition of La Fuerza, Partido Ecologista Colombiano, Democratic Hope, Partido del Trabajo de Colombia, and Movimiento Alternativo Indígena y Social)	391,541	2.01	0
Creemos Colombia	226,380	1.16	0
Coalición Fuerza Ciudadana (Note: A coalition of Fuerza Ciudadana and Commons)	111,156	0.57	0
Con Toda por Colombia	106,939	0.55	0
Oxygen Party	27,482	0.14	0
Patriots	10,291	0.05	0
Secure and Prosperous Colombia	10,184	0.05	0
Blank votes	622,149	3.19	–
Total	19,478,739	100.00	100
Valid votes	19,478,739	94.76	
Invalid votes	1,076,486	5.24	
Total votes	20,555,225	100.00	
Registered voters/turnout	41,287,084	49.79	
Indigenous seats
Indigenous and Social Alternative Movement	88,116	31.86	1
Indigenous Authorities of Colombia	73,203	26.47	1
Unity in Minga Movement for Colombia	55,453	20.05	0
Association of Traditional Indigenous Authorities	16,510	5.97	0
Yes Movement	2,859	1.03	0
Association of Indigenous Councils for Colombia	2,417	0.87	0
National Indigenous Association of Colombia	2,115	0.76	0
Trietnico Gobernativo Trigo	876	0.32	0
ACMIZSAM	838	0.30	0
~~Tevis Indigenous Council~~ (Note: While initially awarded 1,413 votes in the preliminary count, the list was included with 0 votes in the final results, possibly signaling that its registration for the Senate election was revoked or annulled)	0	0.00	0
Blank votes	34,194	12.36	–
Total	276,581	100.00	2
Valid votes	276,581	82.75	
Invalid/blank votes	57,669	17.25	
Total votes	334,250	100.00	
Source: Registraduría

== See also ==
- 2026 Colombian presidential election
