= María Fernanda Cabal =

Colombian politician (born 1966)

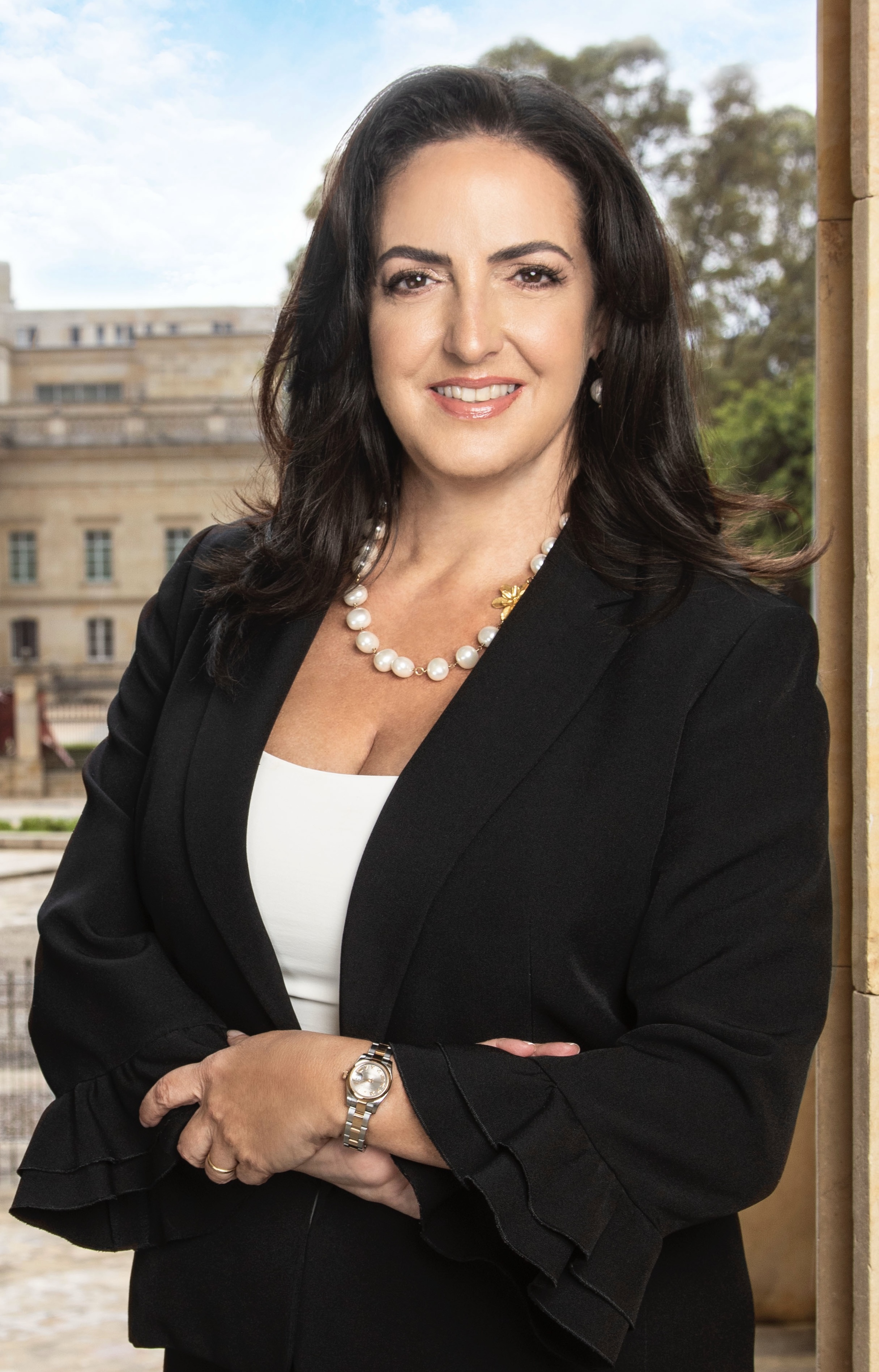
- Official portrait, 2022

Senator of Colombia
- In office July 20, 2018 – June 11, 2026

Member of the Chamber of Representatives
- In office July 20, 2014 – July 20, 2018
- Constituency: Capital District

Director of International Affairs of the Attorney General
- In office October 23, 2005 – March 16, 2007
- Attorney: Mario Iguarán
- Preceded by: Consuelo Caldas
- Succeeded by: Adriana Mercado

Personal details
- Born: María Fernanda Cabal Molina; August 8, 1966 (age 60) Cali, Cauca Valley, Colombia
- Party: Democratic Centre (2013–2026); Republican Party (2026–present)
- Spouse: José Felíx Lafaurie
- Children: 4
- Education: University of the Andes
- Occupation: Political scientist; businesswoman; politician
- Website: Senate website; Party website

María Fernanda Cabal Molina (born August 8, 1966) is a Colombian political scientist, businesswoman, politician, and Senator of Colombia. A member of the Democratic Centre Party, she has held her seat since 2018 and is her party's most voted-for member of Congress.

Born in Cali, Valle del Cauca, Cabal graduated from the University of the Andes in Bogotá, D.C. She began her career as a Member of the Chamber of Representatives in 2014. Cabal was first elected to the Senate in 2018. She was re-elected in 2022. Cabal is a female member of the Democratic Centre, the highest-ranking member in the Senate. Cabal is known for her far-right views. She was one of the members of her party who voted against the plebiscite for the peace process.

== Personal life ==
=== Early life ===
María Fernanda Cabal Molina was born on August 8, 1966, in Cali, Cauca Valley, where she lived until her high school years. She later moved to Bogotá, D.C. to begin her career as a political scientist at the University of the Andes where she joined the Political Science Department as coordinator of the Democracy Program, which was funded by the National Endowment for Democracy. She is of Spanish ancestry from Asturias and Madrid. During the 90's, Cabal participated as a member of the student movement that later promoted the Seventh Ballot, which called for a constitutional reform through the convening of the National Constituent Assembly.

=== Religion ===
Cabal was once at birth baptized under the Catholic rite, by her parents in 1964, despite this she declares herself as a Lapsed Catholic, and has shown herself to be an admirer of the Evangelical Protestant rite, which she has expressed to attend on multiple occasions.

=== Political positions ===
Cabal is known for her conservative positions. As a member of congress, she maintained close relations with the Donald Trump administration in the United States and Jair Bolsonaro of Brazil, as well as being a constant critic of leftist movements in Colombia and Latin America. She is in favor of controversial policies such as promoting the right of civilians to bear arms to defend themselves and the rejection of the peace agreement between the FARC guerrillas and the Colombian government.

Cabal signed the Madrid Charter of the Madrid Forum, joining the right-wing group organized by the Spanish political party Vox.

Political offices
Preceded by Consuelo Caldas	Director of International Affairs of the Attorney General; 2005-2007	Succeeded by Adriana Mercado
