= Historic Pact =

Colombian political party

Historic Pact Pacto Histórico
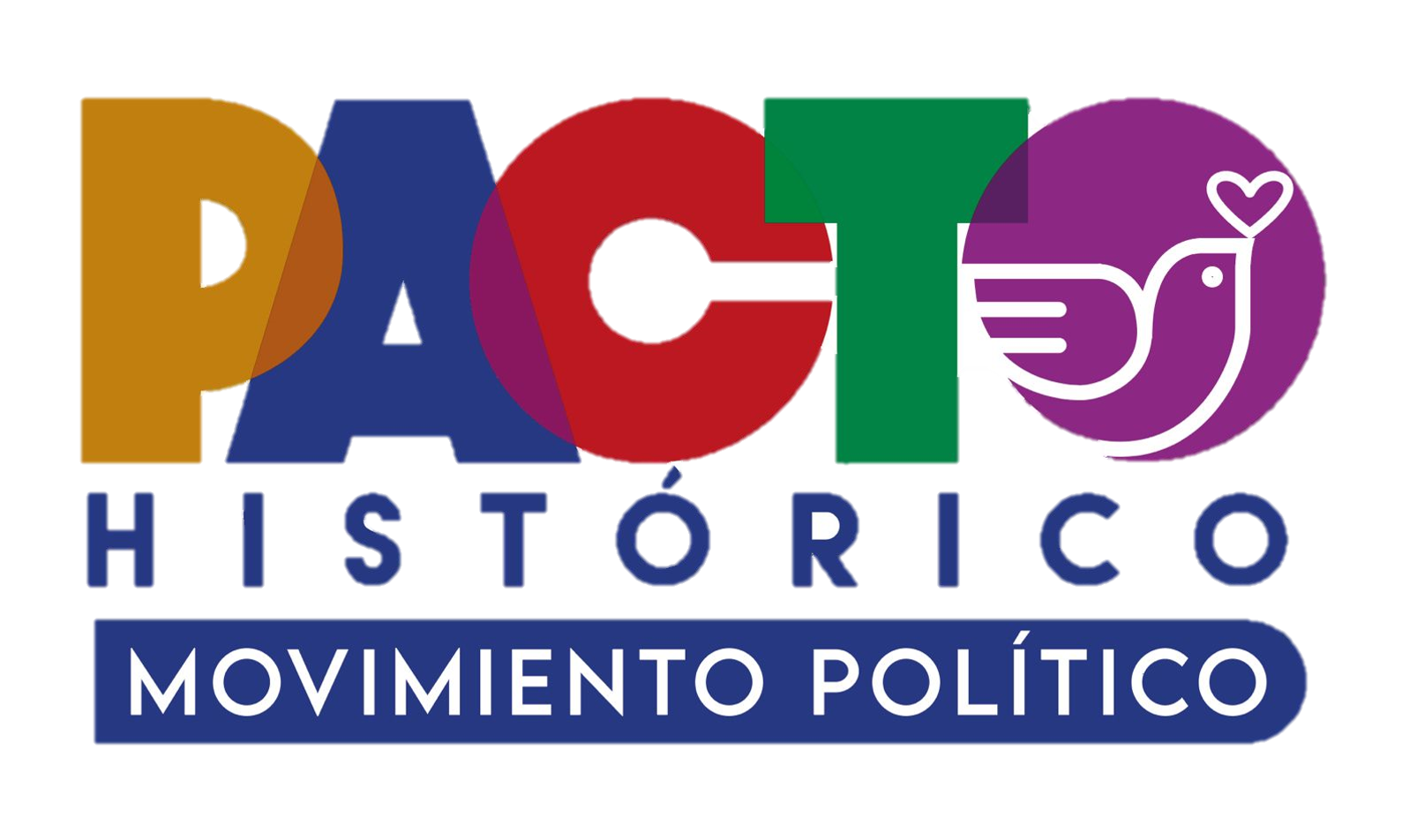
- Leader: Gustavo Petro
- Founder: Gustavo Petro
- Founded: 13 June 2025; 16 months ago
- Registered: 3 December 2025
- Merger of: Humane Colombia; Patriotic Union of Colombia; Alternative Democratic Pole; Colombian Communist Party
- Preceded by: Historic Pact for Colombia
- Headquarters: Bogotá, D.C. 41 Street #13-41
- Ideology: Progressivism
- Political position: Left-wing
- Continental affiliation: São Paulo Forum
- Slogan: Colombia Can
- Bogotá City Council: 4 / 45
- Chamber of Representatives: 45 / 188
- Senate: 25 / 108

Website
- pactohistorico.co

The Historic Pact (Spanish: Pacto Histórico, PH) is a Colombian left-wing progressive political party founded on 13 June 2025. A successor of the Historic Pact for Colombia which existed as a coalition between 2021 and 2025, it is the result of the merger of the Humane Colombia, Patriotic Union, the Alternative Democratic Pole, and the Colombian Communist Party. The merger of the latter was finalized on March 3, 2026, after the National Electoral Council approved the merger after modifying its statutes.

Initially, on 17 September 2025, the National Electoral Council, in its Official Statement, approved the merger of the three parties, excluding Humane Colombia, arguing that it had not met the required quorum as stipulated in its internal statutes. This transformed the Historic Pact into a political movement, officially becoming a party on 3 December 2025.

The Historic Pact, along with the Democratic Center, is one of the two major political factions at the national level, partly due to the political influence of its leaders.

== Political background ==
Following their victory in the 2022 presidential election, the then-political coalition distinguished itself by forming majorities in congress during the eleventh legislature, making it the largest political force in Colombia. The coalition had transformed into the main left-wing force nationally, fueling rumors of a possible merger between the nine coalition parties and the thirteen political movements.

On 17 December 2024, President Gustavo Petro announced the decision to transform the coalition into a single party in order to secure a strong majority in the 2026 legislative elections.

On 13 June 2025, it was confirmed that only the four largest parties, one of the political movements, and the Indigenous Minga would be part of the merger into the new political movement.

In September 2025, after studying the decision and the request from the parties, the National Electoral Council approved the merger of the then-political parties Alternative Democratic Pole, Patriotic Union, and the Colombian Communist Party, excluding Humane Colombia, the Progressives Movement, and the Indigenous Minga. The decision cited the exception of Humane Colombia due to its lack of a sufficient quorum of members, while the exclusion of the latter two was based on their lack of legal status. On 3 March 2026, the CNE accepted Humane Colombia's merger into the PH after it made necessary changes to its statutes.

== Election results ==
=== Presidential elections ===
Election Year	Candidate	Running mate	First Round		Second Round		Result
Election Year	Candidate	Running mate	Votes	Percentage	Votes	Percentage	Result
2026	Iván Cepeda	Aida Quilcué	9,703,921	40.99 (#2)	12,708,312	48.70% (#2)	Lost

=== Legislative elections ===
Election Year	House of Representatives			Senate		
Election Year	Votes	Percentage	Seats	Votes	Percentage	Seats
2026	3,880,148	20.63 (#1)	36 / 161	4,472,061	22.96 (#1)	25 / 103
