= National Electoral Council (Colombia) =

Election commission in Colombia

- Consejo Nacional Electoral

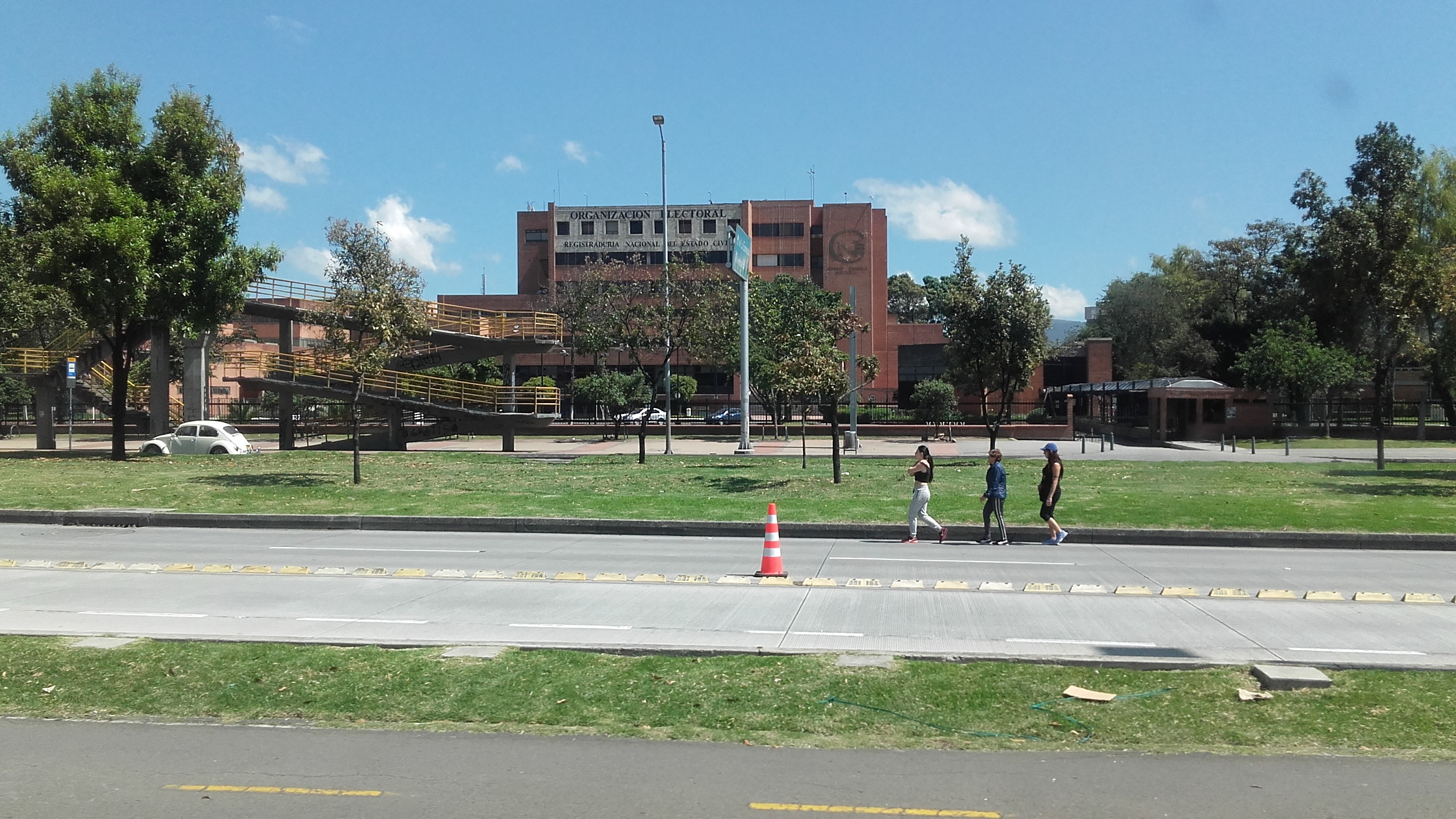

Agency overview
- Formed: 1991
- Jurisdiction: Colombia
- Headquarters: Bogotá
- Agency executive: president
- Website: https://www.cne.gov.co/

The National Electoral Council (Spanish: Consejo Nacional Electoral, CNE) is a Colombian institution under the Colombian Constitution of 1991 which based in Article 265 is in charge of the supreme inspection and vigilance of the electoral organization. The National Electoral Council is supposed to know and decide when and where an election is going to take place. The entity also watches over the Colombian political parties and political movements, their publicity and marketing, polls to guarantee the opposition or minorities also achieve a fair political aspiration.

== Statutory role ==
The National Electoral Council also oversees the financing of political campaigns and the rights of citizens to participate in politics within the law. After every election the electoral council is also in charge of counting the votes and determine within the law and rules the overall winners and accredit them with an official identification. The council also must recognize parties and political movements as legal entities and collaborate with the performing of internal research polls within the political parties and political movements through the government owned media.

== Leadership ==
One of the presidents of the Council was Guillermo Reyes González.

== See also ==
- Elections in Colombia
- Politics of Colombia
- List of political parties in Colombia
