= Gabriel Vallejo =

Colombian politician (born 1976)

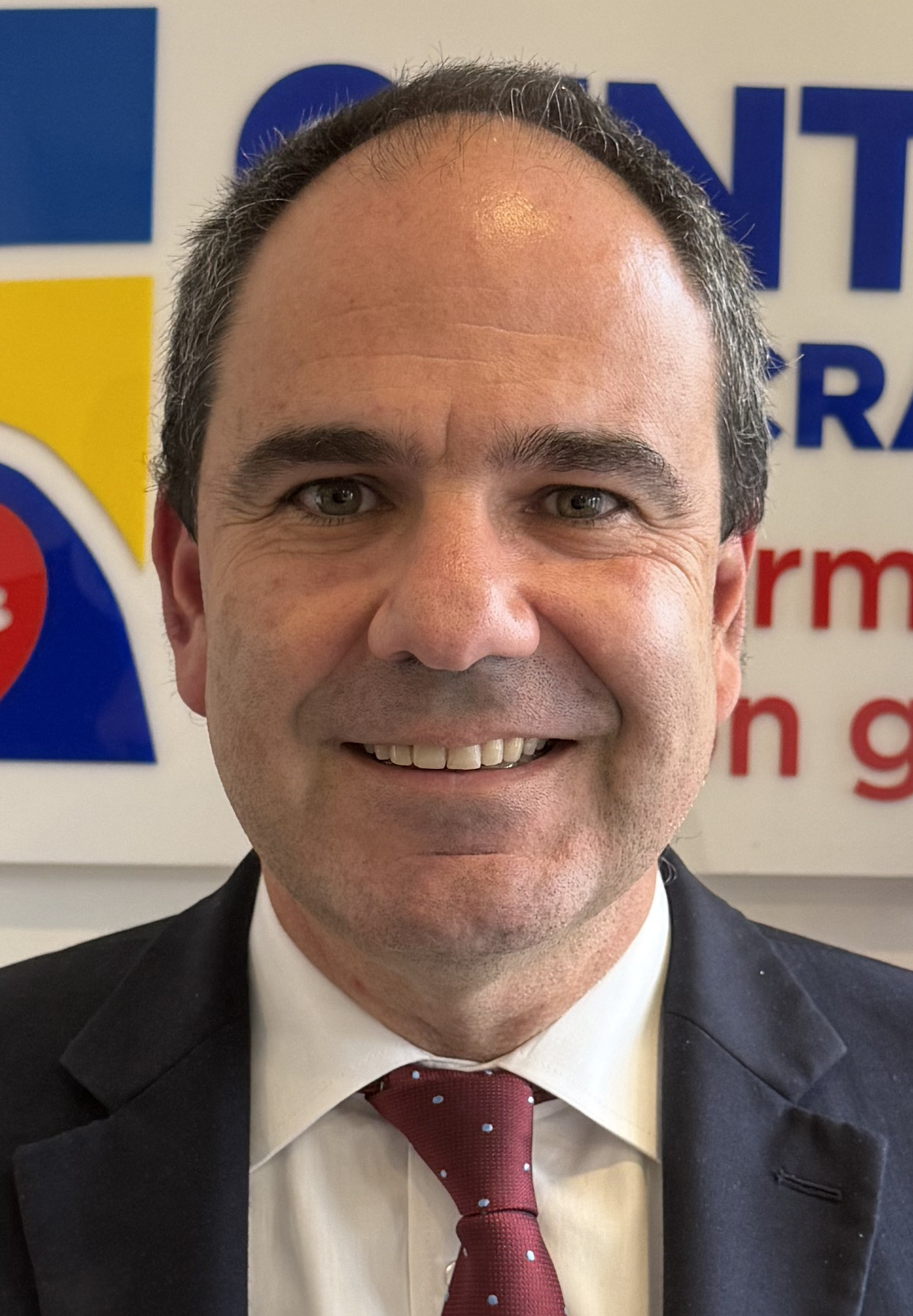
- Vallejo in 2025

Member of the Chamber of Representatives
- In office 20 July 2018 – 20 July 2022
- Constituency: Risaralda

Personal details
- Born: 22 September 1976 (age 49)
- Party: Democratic Centre

Gabriel Jaime Vallejo Chujfi (born 22 September 1976) is a Colombian politician serving as director of the Democratic Centre since 2024. From 2018 to 2022, he was a member of the Chamber of Representatives.
