= Colombia Justa Libres =

Fair Free Colombia Colombia Justa Libres
- Abbreviation: CJL
- President: Ricardo Arias Mora
- General Secretary: José Fernando García Gómez
- Founded: 11 December 2017
- Merger of: Colombia Justa, Libres
- Youth wing: RUGE!
- Ideology: Conservatism; Christian democracy Christian right Agrarianism
- Political position: Right-wing
- National affiliation: Nos Une Colombia
- Slogan: «Let's do it together!» (Spanish: «¡Hagámoslo Juntos!»)
- Seats in the Chamber of Representatives: 0 / 188
- Seats in the Senate: 1 / 108

Website
- www.colombiajustalibres.org

Colombia Justa Libres (English: Fair Free Colombia; CJL) is a right-wing Colombian political party founded in 2017 that groups the majority of evangelical denominations in the country together. This includes, among others, Assemblies of God, Foursquare Church, Peace Mission to the Nations, and Spring of Eternal Life. During the 2018 Colombian parliamentary election, four of its members were elected to the Congress of Colombia. After the 2022 legislative election, the party formed the Nos Une Colombia coalition with the MIRA. It has the slogan "Let's do it together!" and a youth wing known as "RUGE!".

== Ideology ==
The party adheres to conservatism in the anti-abortion framework with right-wing Christian democratic principles. It also adheres to a few Agrarian ideas.

== History ==
Colombia Justa Libres emerged from a merger of two political movements:

- Libres, a movement that had already participated in the 2015 Colombian regional and municipal elections, launched a list to the Bogotá City Council with Ricardo Arias Mora, leader of the movement, as a candidate for Mayor of Bogotá. Arias obtained around 100,000 votes. In addition, he presented the project of the family ministry to Former President Juan Manuel Santos after the plebiscite on the Colombian peace accords of 2016. The list to the Bogotá city council managed to obtain over 70,000 votes and got a representative: Emel Rojas.
- Colombia Justa, which began when Pastor Héctor Pardo of the Tabernáculo de la Fe Church, Pastor Eduardo Cañas of the Manantial de Vida Church, and Pastor John Milton Rodríguez of the Misión Paz a las Naciones Church participated in the peace dialogues between the Santos government and the FARC. After the meetings, they became disenchanted with participating in the dialogues, claiming that it "facilitated" the FARC's access to power. The three pastors invited more leaders from Colombia. Four national and more than seventy regional calls were made to communicate with victims of the armed conflict, military, Afro-descendants and indigenous peoples, founding Colombia Justa.

Colombia Justa and Libres subsequently constituted to be an influential group of citizens: Colombia Justa Libres on 11 December 2017. The 2018 Colombian parliamentary election obtained 431,506 votes, 3%, which is necessary to constitute itself as a political party, achieving three senators and one representative.

During the 2019 local elections, they supported the candidate at the time, Miguel Uribe Turbay, and obtained two seats in the Bogotá council.

In 2021, a conflict between the party's leadership occurred upon the resignation of Pastor Eduardo Cañas, whose position was filled by another of the directors: John Milton Rodríguez. This violated the party's statutes, as the Council of Elders intended to choose his replacement. Subsequently, Rodríguez, who faced no official opposition, with the permission of the party Supervisor Héctor Pardo, held a parallel assembly designating himself as the presidential candidate of the party, which was opposed by the other members, mainly Ricardo Arias Mora, another presidential candidate of the party, and Pardo, who later resigned from office. Arias led a lawsuit about this before the Electoral Council. The case succeeded, and on 15 February 2022, the National Electoral Council revoked Rodríguez's presidential candidacy application. However, two months later, on 21 April, the Electoral Council decided to allow Rodríguez to compete as a presidential candidate because the legitimate authorities granted the application".

== Representatives ==
=== Council of Bogotá ===
- Emel Rojas Castillo
- Marco Acosta Rico

=== House of Representatives ===
- Representative for Bogotá: Carlos Eduardo Acosta Lozano

=== Senate of the Republic ===
- John Milton Rodríguez
- Edgar Enrique Palacio

== Election results ==
=== Legislative elections ===
Year	House of Representatives			Senate		
Year	Votes	%	Seats	Votes	%	Seats
2018	431,506	2.81	1 / 172	463,521	2.81	3 / 108
2022	With MIRA		1 / 188	With MIRA		4 / 108
2026				With CR-ALMA		0 / 108

== Religious sector coalition ==
External videos
- Anuncio de la coalición Nos Une Colombia on YouTube

In September 2021, the directors and members of Congress of Colombia Justa Libres agreed with the MIRA party to present joint lists to the Senate and the Chamber in more than seven departments or constituencies, calling it the Nos Une Colombia coalition. It seeks to promote and defend religious freedom in Colombia using elected members of Congress.

== See also ==
- Religion in Colombia
- List of political parties in Colombia
