= Republican Party (Colombia) =

Colombian political party

Republican Party (Colombia) Partido Republicano
- Leader: Camilo Andrés Larios Álvarez, María Fernanda Cabal
- Founder: Rodolfo Hernández Suárez
- Founded: October 2019; 4 August 2022 (party)
- Preceded by: Civic Movement "Logic, Ethics and Aesthetics"
- Headquarters: Cl. 54 #28 42, Barrio Nuevo Sotomayor, Bucaramanga
- Youth wing: Jovenes Republicanos
- Ideology: Ultraconservatism; Right-wing populism; Constitutionalism; Until 2026: Populism; Anti-politics; Neoliberalism; Economic liberalism; Catch-all party
- Political position: Far-right
- Chamber of Representatives: 0 / 188
- Senate: 0 / 108

Website
- https://partidorepublicano.co/nosotros

The Republican Party (previously known as League of Anti-Corruption Governors), is a Colombian political movement, created in October 2019 by the former mayor of Bucaramanga, Rodolfo Hernández Suárez, and by the candidates for the 2020–2023 municipal council. It was conceived as an independent civic alternative to traditional political parties and ideologies, with the purpose of reaching the presidency of the republic in the 2022 election. Earlier, in the 2015 local elections, Rodolfo Hernández managed to reach the Mayor's Office of Bucaramanga through an independent candidacy via the "Movimiento Cívico Lógica Etica y Estética", previously founded by Hernández to support his political campaign. In May 2022, Hernández finished in second place in the first round of the presidential elections, proceeding to the second round against Gustavo Petro. He finished in second place in the second round as well. On 18 August 2026, The Consejo Nacional Electoral (CNE) approved the change of the former "League of Anti-Corruption governors" to the Republican Party, and in October of 2026, former senator María Fernanda Cabal, joined as its first member and leader with the purpose of promoting a "New right movement" towards 2027 elections. The party declared itself before the CNE as a governing party supporting the administration of President Abelardo de la Espriella and its movement "Defenders of the Homeland".

== History ==
=== Formation and 2022 elections ===
The League of Anti-Corruption Governors originated from the Civic Movement "Logic, Ethics, and Aesthetics" (Movimiento Cívico Lógica, Ética y Estética), an independent initiative established in 2015 to support civil engineer Rodolfo Hernández Suárez's successful mayoral campaign in Bucaramanga. In October 2019, Hernández formalized the movement alongside candidates for the Bucaramanga municipal council. The movement's platform centered on anti-corruption policies and fiscal austerity, aiming to serve as the political vehicle for his 2022 presidential bid.

For the 2022 Colombian presidential election, the movement registered Hernández and academic Marelen Castillo as his vice-presidential running mate via signature collection. Campaigning heavily on social media under the slogan "Don't steal, don't lie, don't betray" (No robar, no mentir, no traicionar), the ticket advanced to the second round. On 19 June 2022, they were defeated by Gustavo Petro of the Historic Pact for Colombia coalition, receiving over 10.5 million votes.

As the runner-up ticket, the Colombian Opposition Statute granted Hernández a seat in the Senate of Colombia and Castillo a seat in the Chamber of Representatives of Colombia. Following these results, the National Electoral Council (CNE) officially granted the movement legal status (personería jurídica) as a political party on 4 August 2022.

=== Internal division and 2023 regional elections ===
In September 2022, a dispute within the party leadership resulted in the exclusion of Castillo and other elected representatives from the party's constituent assembly and foundational statutes.During this period, the party formally declared itself in political opposition to the Petro administration.

Hernández resigned from his Senate seat in October 2022 to campaign for the governorship of Santander Department in the 2023 Colombian regional elections.However, the CNE revoked his candidacy in September 2023 due to three previous disciplinary sanctions issued by the Office of the Inspector General of Colombia, rendering him legally disqualified from holding public office. The party's political director, Camilo Larios, attempted to file legal injunctions (acciones de tutela) to protect Hernández's political rights and suspend the ruling, but the disqualification was upheld.

=== Hernández's death and reorganization (2024–2026) ===
On 14 March 2024, Hernández was convicted in the first instance of the crime of undue interest in the celebration of contracts. The conviction was related to the "Vitalogic" case, which involved irregularities in waste management consulting contracts during his mayoral term in Bucaramanga. During the trial hearings, he publicly disclosed a terminal colon cancer diagnosis. Following medical complications, Hernández died on 2 September 2024, at the Hospital Internacional de Colombia in Piedecuesta at age 79, leaving the party without its founder and central figure.

Following Hernández's death, Camilo Andrés Larios Álvarez assumed the national leadership in 2025. The party underwent an internal restructuring, rebranding as a "Citizen Platform" (Plataforma Ciudadana). The organization focused its activities on political education programs and digital citizen oversight initiatives, such as "Legislative Control" (Control Legislativo), to monitor public contracting.

== Party status ==
Hernández submitted an application with the National Electoral Council (CNE) on 19 July 2022 for LIGA to be granted legal status as a political party. In the submission, Hernández emphasised his presidential ticket's second place in the presidential election and how he and Castillo had taken their respective seats in the senate and chamber of representatives reserved for the second place presidential and vice presidential candidates. He also mentioned LIGA's convention, which declared its opposition to the government of Gustavo Petro. The CNE granted legal party status to LIGA on 4 August, and Hernández became the party's president. He appointed his wife, Socorro Oliveros as national director.

== Political positions ==
=== League of Anti-corruption Governors ===
During its existence under the League of Anti-corruption Governors (LIGA), the party’s political identity was primarily associated with anti-corruption, criticism of the political establishment and the personalist leadership of its founder. Alexander Ugalde Zubiri described it as an independent civic alternative with little nationwide organisational structure and a programme that was “liberal in socioeconomic terms”. María García-Maseda and Gemma Vicente Iglesias similarly characterised LIGA as a personalist and technocratic platform with a pronounced anti-politics discourse. Felipe Rodríguez described it as a “partido escoba”, or catch-all party, established specifically to support Hernández’s presidential candidacy. These descriptions present the organisation as an electoral vehicle with a comparatively broad and underdeveloped ideological profile, rather than a party built around a detailed, internally consistent doctrine.

Several publications and media outlets have explicitly placed LIGA within the far-right Other media outlets described the party as centre-right. Also there is an article that describes it as right-wing.

Other works cited in discussions of the far-right label focus principally on Hernández or his 2022 candidacy. Marinana Andrade e Barros discussed Hernández among Latin American cases associated with the rise of far-right forces; Daniel C. Hallin, Philip Kitzberger and Manel Palos-Pons referred to him as a far-right populist leader; and a 2023 study by Julián Andrés Escobar Gómez described him as a prominent representative of the Colombian far right. Sandra Botero and José Miguel Jaimes Prada, by contrast, rejected classifying Hernández’s 2022 campaign as far right, arguing that its programme combined eclectic positions and often underspecified proposals.

LIGA’s economic orientation was also described in liberal and neoliberal terms. Ugalde Zubiri characterised its programme as liberal in socioeconomic terms, while Pablo Garcés-Velástegui discussed the party as an illustration of neoliberalism in Colombia’s debate over development models. The role of populism in LIGA’s political profile has been interpreted differently. Maicol Leonardo Jojoa Palma described LIGA as a populist political party, citing its slogan, “No robar, no mentir, no traicionar” (“Do not steal, do not lie, do not betray”). Adalberto López Robles’s analysis of social-media posts from the 2022 presidential campaign also identified populist rhetoric, while Blendi Kajsiu and Ana María Restrepo-Ossa argued that the discourse did not meet their conceptual definition of populism, despite its strong anti-politics dimension.

=== Republican Party ===
In 2026, the party adopted the name Republican Party and began presenting a more explicitly right-wing political identity. In October, María Fernanda Cabal joined the organisation and announced that she would lead a “new right”.

The new political identity has been directly described in far-right terms by the press. In October 2026, Vanguardia characterised the rebranded organisation as a “Trumpist far-right party”, linking the change to Cabal’s arrival and the party’s new political direction. The article also quoted an analyst who argued that Cabal’s ideas differed substantially from the political profile of the former LIGA, an important distinction when comparing the two periods.

== Electoral history ==
=== Presidential elections ===
Election year	Candidate	Running mate	First round		Second round		Result
Election year	Candidate	Running mate	Votes	%	Votes	%	Result
2022	Rodolfo Hernández Suárez	Marelen Castillo	5,965,335	28.17	10,580,412	47.31	Lost ✗
Sources: La Registraduria Prensa (First round), Registraduria (Second round)
