= Senate of Colombia =

Upper house of the Colombian Congress

Coordinates: 4°35′51″N 74°04′35″W

Senate of Colombia Senado de Colombia
- 10th Congress
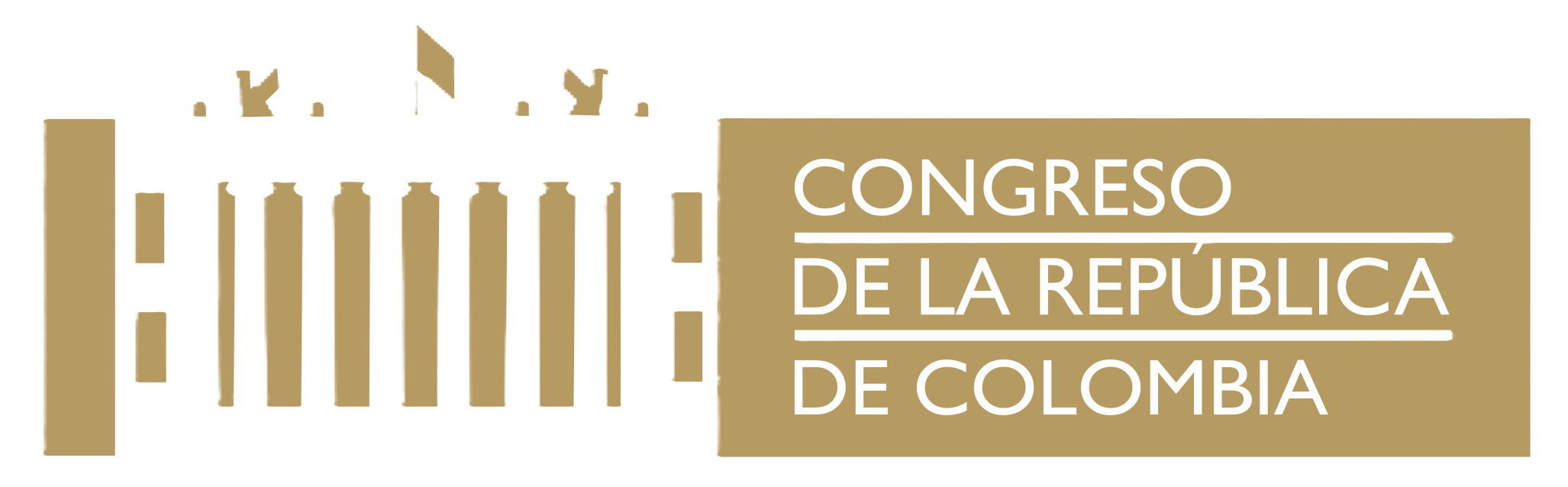

Type
- Type: Upper house of the Congress of Colombia

Leadership
- President: Honorio Henríquez (CD) since 20 July 2026
- First Vice President: Manuel Virgüez (MIRA) since 20 July 2026
- Second Vice President: Alejandro Ocampo (PH) since 20 July 2026

Structure
- Seats: 103
- Political groups: Government (63): Democratic Center (17); Liberal (13); Conservative (10); Union Party (8); Radical Change (7); National Salvation Movement (4); ASI (3); Democratic Party (1); Independents (12): Green Alliance (6); MIRA (3); AICO (1); New Liberalism (1); Dignity and Commitment (1); Opposition (28): Historic Pact (26); En Marcha (1); MAIS (1)

Elections
- Voting system: Proportional representation
- Last election: 8 March 2026

Meeting place
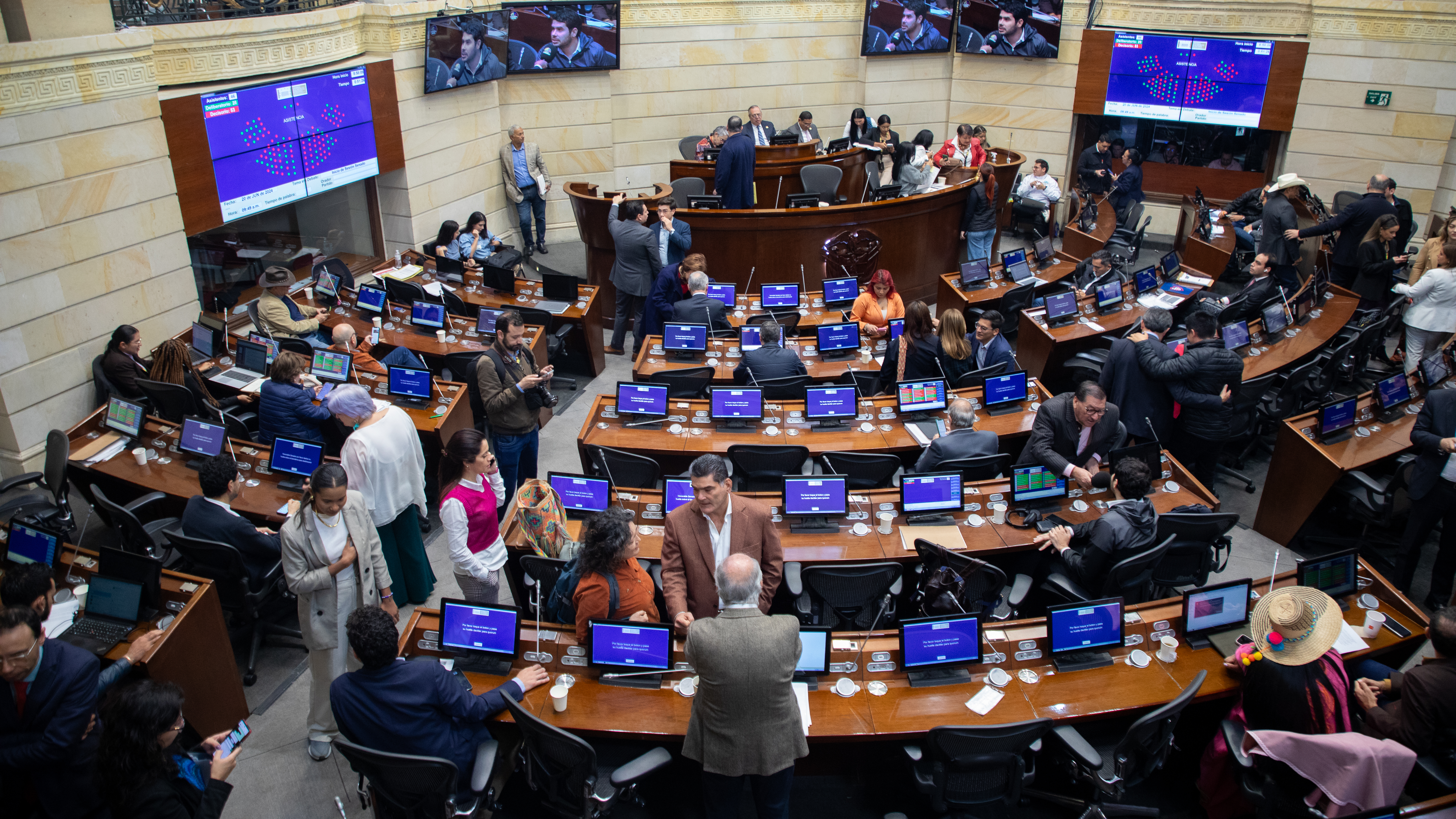
- Capitolio Nacional, Bogotá, D.C.

Website
- senado.gov.co

The Senate of the Republic of Colombia (Spanish: Senado de la República de Colombia) is the upper house of the Congress of Colombia, with the lower house being the Chamber of Representatives. The Senate has 103 members elected for concurrent (non-staggered) four-year terms.

== Electoral system ==
According to the Colombian Constitution (1991), 100 senators (senadores) are elected from a single national constituency, and another two are elected in a special national constituency for Indigenous communities and the presidential opposition gets one more, for a total of 103.

Colombian citizens living outside the country are eligible to vote, although, unlike in the lower house, they have no special representatives in the Senate.

For elections to the Senate in the national constituency, political parties or other movements and groups run single lists, with several candidates not exceeding the total number of seats to be filled. The current electoral system, adopted in 2003 and modified in 2009 and 2015, requires party lists to pass a 3% threshold in order to obtain representation. For the 2006 and 2010 elections, the threshold was set at 2%, before being raised by the 2009 reform to 3%.

Parties may run a closed list, with the order of candidates pre-determined, or opt for preferential voting (open list), where the position of candidates on the list is reordered based on the individual preference votes of the voters. In senatorial elections, voters choosing a party running a closed list only vote for the party list; voters who choose a party running an open list may indicate their candidate of preference among the names displayed on the ballot, if the voter does not indicate a preference and only votes for the party, the vote is valid for purposes of the threshold but not for reordering the list based on preferential votes.

For the two seats reserved to Indigenous communities, the electoral quota system is used (total votes divided by the total seats), with the threshold in this case being 30% of the electoral quota.

== Eligibility ==
To be a senator, a person must be a natural-born Colombian citizen over the age of 30 at the time of the election. Representatives of indigenous communities seeking election as a representative of indigenous communities in the Senate must have held a traditional authority role in their community or have been the leader of an indigenous organization.

There are general rules of ineligibility and incompatibility which apply to both houses of Congress, explained here. In addition, general rules on the replacement and non-replacement of members depending on different circumstances also apply to both houses of Congress.

== Exclusive powers of the Senate ==
1. Approve or reject the resignations of the President and the Vice President.
2. Approve or reject all military promotions conferred by the government on commissioned officers.
3. Grant leaves of absence for the President in cases other than sickness, and determine the qualification of the Vice President to serve as President.
4. Allow for the transit of foreign troops through Colombian territory.
5. Authorize the Government to declare war on a foreign nation.
6. Elect the Constitutional Court justices.
7. Elect the Attorney General.

=== Judicial powers ===
The Congress' judicial powers are divided between the Chamber of Representatives and the Senate. The Senate is responsible for taking cognizance of the charges brought by the House of Representatives against the President (or whoever replaces them) and members of the Comisión de Aforados even if they may have ceased to exercise their functions. The Senate determines the validity of the charges concerning actions or omissions that occurred in the exercise of these duties.

The Senate may assign the preliminary investigation to a group of its members, but the judgement is pronounced in a public session with at least two-thirds of senators in attendance.

In the trials to be conducted before the Senate, the accused is automatically suspended from their office once the charges brought have been admitted. If the charge refers to offences committed in the exercise of their duties or unworthiness to serve for misconduct, the Senate may only discharge them from office and/or temporarily or permanently strip the accused of their political rights. The accused, however, is brought to trial before the Supreme Court of Justice, if the evidence demonstrates the individual to be responsible for an infraction deserving of other penalties. If the charge refers to common crimes, the Senate confines itself to declaring if there are grounds for further measures. In the affirmative, the accused is placed at the disposition of the Supreme Court.

== Latest election ==
Senado de Colombia 2026–2030
Party	Votes	%	Seats
Historic Pact	4,471,238	22.95	25
Democratic Centre	3,072,702	15.77	17
Colombian Liberal Party	2,276,223	11.68	13
Alliance for Colombia (Note: A coalition of Green Alliance, En Marcha, Colombian Democratic Party, Colombia Renaciente, and Independent Social Alliance)	1,905,680	9.78	10
Colombian Conservative Party	1,853,403	9.51	10
Party of the U	1,554,812	7.98	9
Radical Change–ALMA Coalition (Note: A coalition of Radical Change, LIGA, Colombia Justa Libres, and Broad Democratic Alliance)	1,241,509	6.37	7
Colombia Now (Note: A coalition of MIRA, New Liberalism, and Dignity and Compromise)	891,907	4.58	5
National Salvation Movement	707,764	3.63	4
Frente Amplio Unitario (Note: A coalition of La Fuerza, Partido Ecologista Colombiano, Democratic Hope, Partido del Trabajo de Colombia, and Movimiento Alternativo Indígena y Social)	396,042	2.03	0
Creemos Colombia	227,957	1.17	0
Coalición Fuerza Ciudadana	114,722	0.59	0
Con Toda por Colombia	105,393	0.54	0
Oxygen Party	27,879	0.14	0
Patriots	10,755	0.06	0
Secure and Prosperous Colombia	10,754	0.06	0
Blank votes	616,998	3.17	–
Total	19,485,738	100.00	100
Valid votes	19,485,738	94.80	
Invalid votes	1,069,091	5.20	
Total votes	20,554,829	100.00	
Registered voters/turnout	41,287,084	49.79	
Indigenous seats
Indigenous and Social Alternative Movement	88,294	29.05	1
Indigenous Authorities of Colombia	72,927	23.99	1
Unity in Minga Movement for Colombia	56,060	18.44	0
Association of Traditional Indigenous Authorities	16,628	5.47	0
Yes Movement	3,001	0.99	0
Association of Indigenous Councils for Colombia	2,644	0.87	0
National Indigenous Association of Colombia	2,434	0.80	0
Tevis Indigenous Council	1,413	0.46	0
ACMIZSAM	1,067	0.35	0
Trietnico Gobernativo Trigo	972	0.32	0
Blank votes	58,539	19.26	–
Total	303,979	100.00	2
Valid votes	303,979	74.44	
Invalid/blank votes	104,357	25.56	
Total votes	408,336	100.00	
Source: RTVC

== See also ==
- List of presidents of the Senate of Colombia
