= Broad Democratic Alliance =

Colombian political party

Broad Democratic Alliance Alianza Democrática Amplia
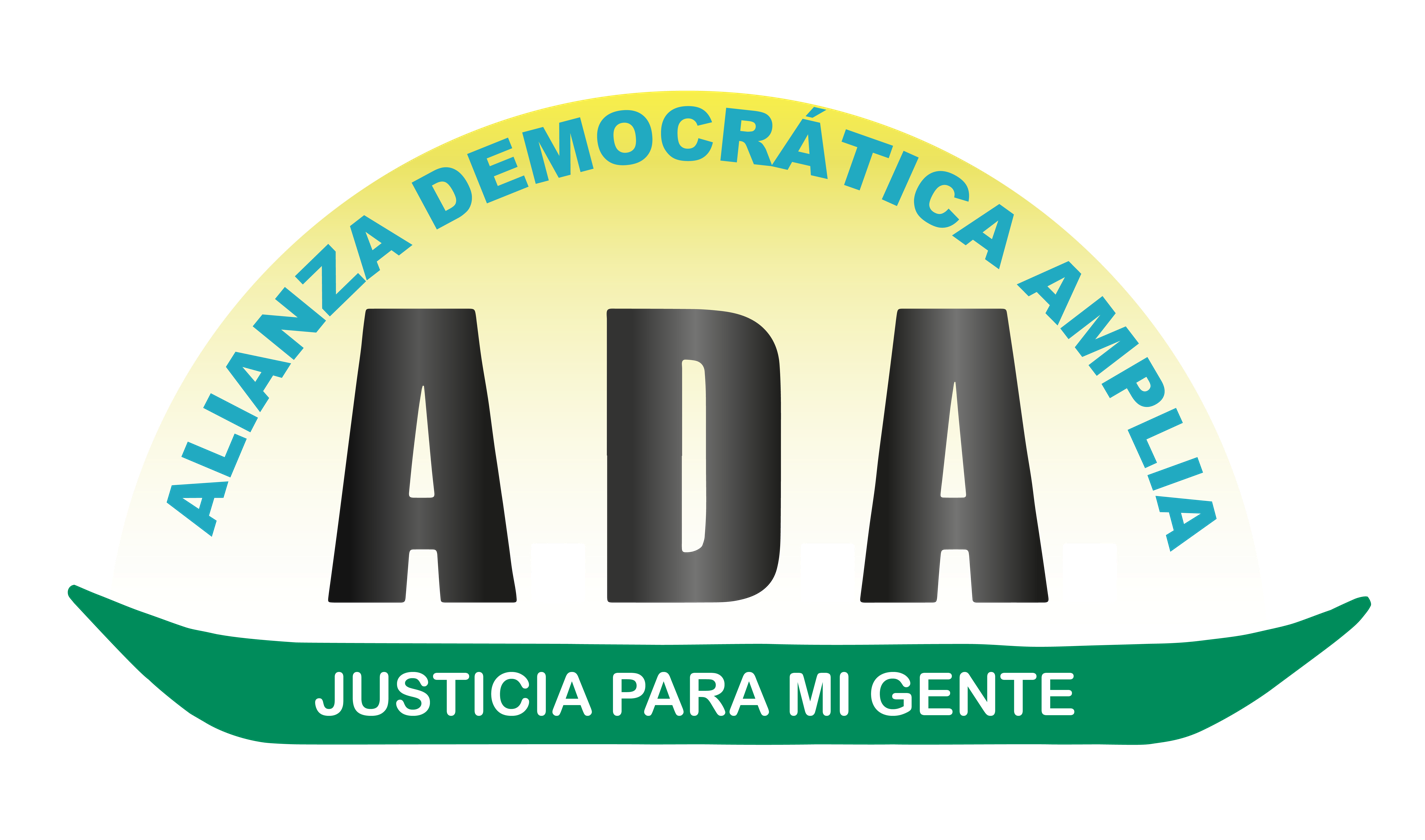
- President: Paulino Riascos
- Founded: 2018
- Headquarters: Bogotá, Colombia
- Ideology: Afro-Colombians interests Political ecology
- Political position: Big tent
- National affiliation: Historic Pact for Colombia
- Colours: Light blue
- Chamber of Representatives: 1 / 188
- Senate: 2 / 108
- Governors: 0 / 32
- Mayors: 5 / 1,102

Website
- www.partidoada.org

The Broad Democratic Alliance (ADA), formerly the Afro-Colombian Democratic Alliance, is a political party born from the entry into Congress of the La Mamuncia Community Council in the 2018 legislative elections for Afro seats. Its representative is Hernán Banguero.

For the 2019 Colombian regional elections, it has registered more than 3,500 candidates with its endorsements, a large number for a newly formed party.

In 2019 and 2020, together with the MIRA party, they were the only two parties to invest 5% or more of state resources in the effective inclusion of women, in accordance with Law 1475 of 2011.
