= Oxygen Party =

Political party in Colombia

Oxygen Green Party Partido Verde Oxígeno
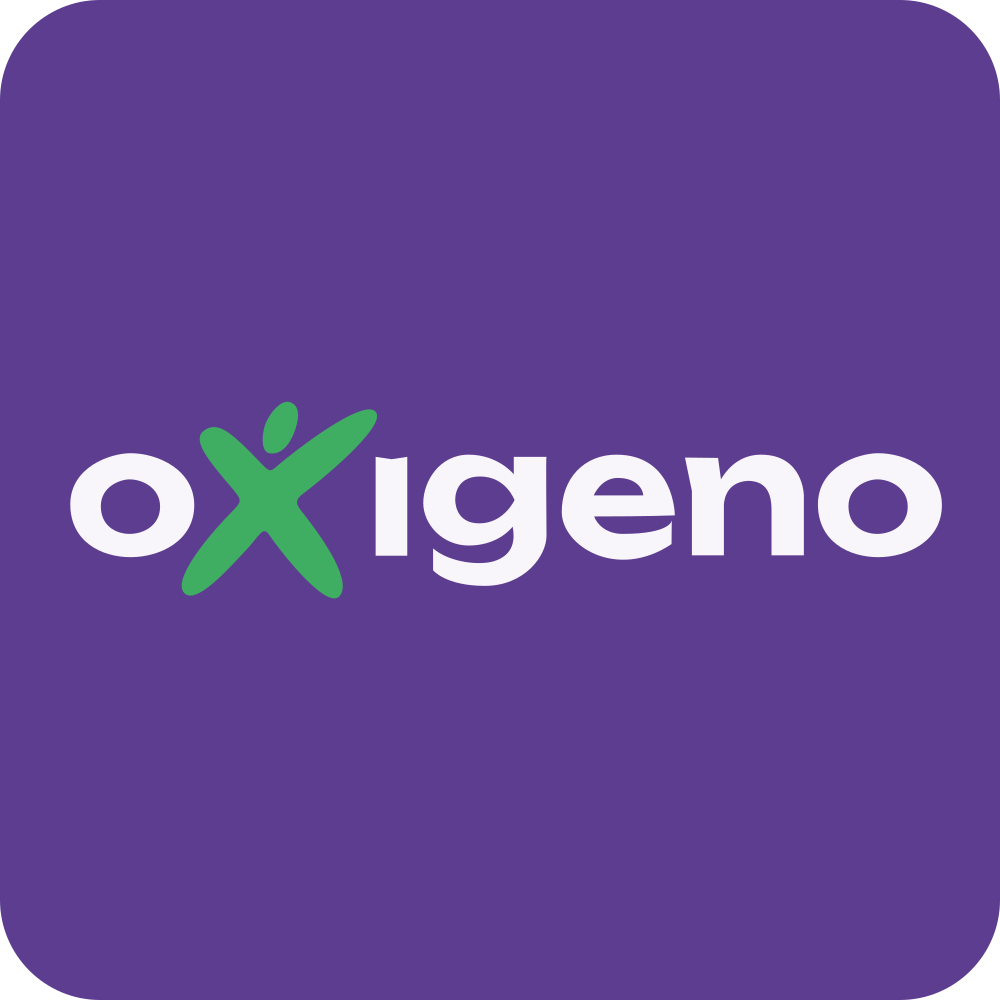
- President: Íngrid Betancourt
- Founded: 1998; 2021
- Headquarters: Bogotá
- Ideology: Green conservatism Formerly: Environmentalism; Pacifism
- Political position: Center-right to right-wing Formerly: Center to center-left
- National affiliation: Hope Center Coalition
- Chamber of Representatives: 1 / 188
- Senate: 1 / 108

Website
- https://verdeoxigeno.com/

The Oxygen Green Party (Spanish: Partido Verde Oxígeno) is a political party in Colombia founded in 1998. After Íngrid Betancourt, one of its most prominent members, was kidnapped in 2002, the party's popular support began to fade. In 2005, a political reform on the Colombian party system left the party without participation, due to low popular support.

After her rescue in 2008, Betancourt moved to France, but returned to Colombia in to relaunch her political career.

The party initially joined the Hope Center Coalition, with Betancourt and Carlos Amaya as its candidates in the coalition primaries for the 2022 Colombian presidential election. However, the party quickly left the coalition over disagreements on government support.

A few months later, the party’s two elected members, Humberto de La Calle and Daniel Carvalho were expelled from the party due to differing views on Green policies.

Other prominent figures are breaking with the party in the run-up to the 2026 elections. Former senator Sofía Gaviria denounces "undemocratic practices, the lack of promised financial support, a family structure that favors personal interests over those of the country, and mistreatment.

== See also ==
- Green Party (Colombia)
