= Union Party for the People =

Colombian political party

Union Party for the People Partido de la Unión por la Gente
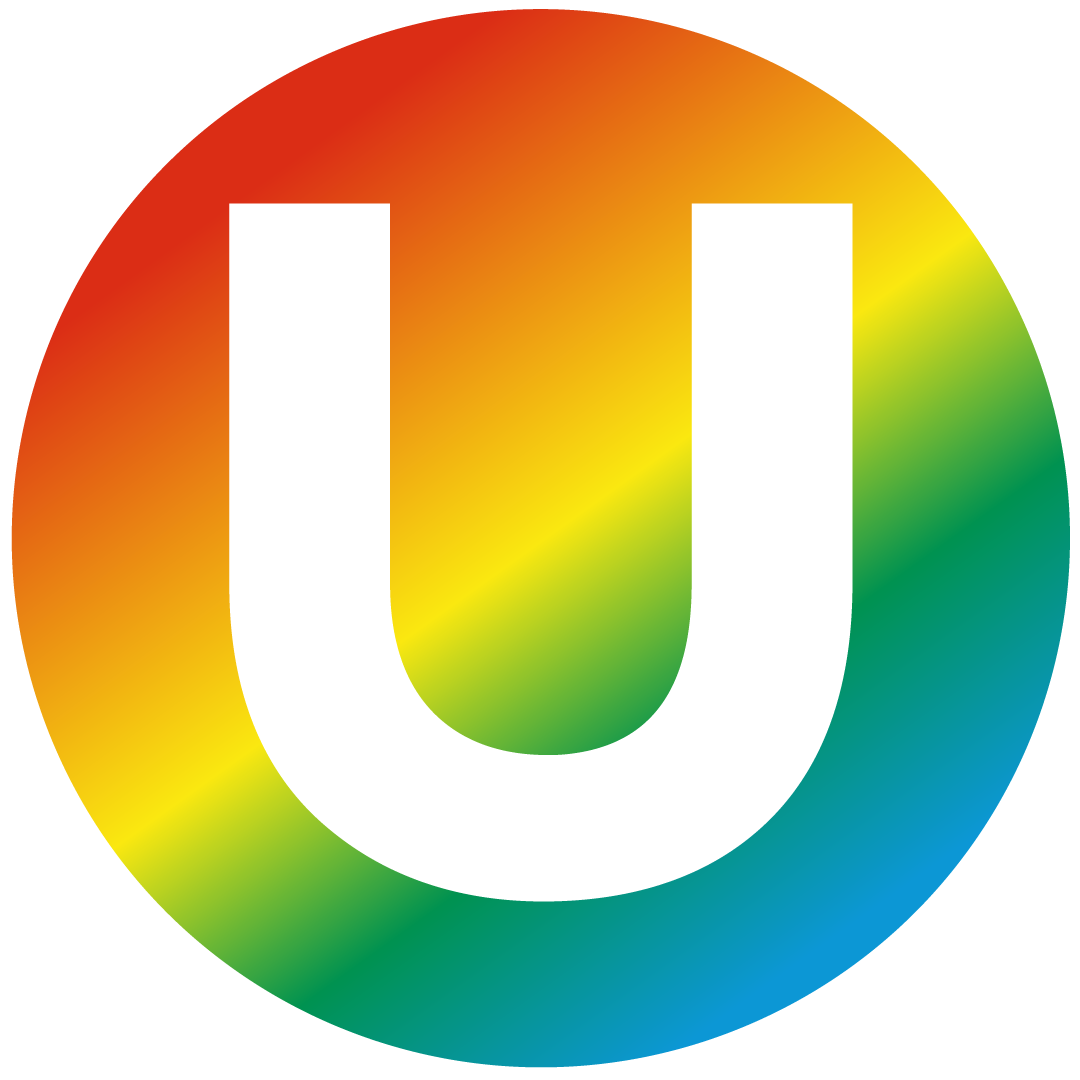
- President: Dilian Francisca Toro
- Leader: Juan Manuel Santos
- Founded: 2005; 21 years ago
- Split from: Colombian Liberal Party
- Headquarters: Bogotá, Colombia
- Ideology: Liberalism (Colombian); Conservatism (Colombia); Third Way; Economic liberalism; Historical: Uribism
- Political position: Centre-right
- National affiliation: Team for Colombia (2021–2022)
- International affiliation: Liberal International (observer)
- Colours: Orange
- Chamber of Representatives: 15 / 188
- Senate: 10 / 108
- Governors: 4 / 32
- Mayors: 258 / 1,102

Website
- www.partidodelau.com
- Politics of Colombia; Political parties; Elections; A: It has been also positioned as centre-left and centrist.

The Union Party for the People (Spanish: Partido de la Unión por la Gente), or Party of the U (Spanish: Partido de la U), is a liberal political party in Colombia. The Party is led by former president Juan Manuel Santos.

After supporting the presidencies of Álvaro Uribe, Juan Manuel Santos and Iván Duque, the party is currently part of the majority of left-wing president Gustavo Petro.

== History ==
The Party was formed in 2005, with the objective of uniting various congressional supporters of President Alvaro Uribe, also known as Uribistas, into one political party, and to provide a political platform for the 2006 Colombian presidential elections. Most of its members defected from the Colombian Liberal Party, yet it failed to unite all Uribistas: in particular the Radical Change (Cambio Radical) refused to join.

In 2006, the party took part in the parliamentary elections, in which it won 30 out of 166 deputies and 20 out of 100 senators. Three years later, more than half of the congressmen from the Radical Change Party changed their standing towards the Party of the U, which resulted in it becoming Colombia's largest political party.

For the 2010 presidential elections, Party of the U chose former Defense Minister Juan Manuel Santos as a presidential candidate and Governor Angelino Garzon as a vice presidential candidate. Juan Manuel Santos was elected with 69% of the vote in the runoff. The Party also obtained 27 seats in the Senate in the 2010 congressional elections.

In 2012, the Uribistas and former President Alvaro Uribe along with Francisco Santos Calderon decided to form their own separate party, the Democratic Center. This was the result of constant intervention and criticism from former President Alvaro Uribe towards his presidential successor Juan Manuel Santos. The announcement of peace negotiations with the FARC and the Colombian Government was a partial factor that led to the fragmentation. Nevertheless, the party did not suffer high-level defections towards the Democratic Center. It came first in the Senate elections, followed in second place by the Democratic Center led by Alvaro Uribe who then became a Senator.

In 2014, President Juan Manuel Santos was re-elected for a second term, in a close race against former cabinet colleague and ex-Finance Minister Oscar Ivan Zuluaga of the Democratic Center.

In 2021, political leaders from multiple parties formed a coalition called the Historic Pact for Colombia. After the election of President Gustavo Petro in 2022, Party of the U allied with the Liberal Party and the Conservative Party.

== Ideological platform ==
The Programmatic Declaration (Declaración Programática) is the official ideological platform of the party.

- The Social Party of National Unity supports the development of the welfare state and recognises the family as the base of society.
- The Party supports the implementation of a market-based economy.
- It promotes globalisation, emphasising education, science, and technology as key pillars that can help Colombia succeed in a global market.
- The Party supports decentralisation and more autonomy of the regions. Currently, the Caribbean Region is the first to begin the process to obtain more autonomy.
- President Santos has also claimed that he supports Tony Blair's Third Way approach.

Since 2012, the party has been an observer member of the Liberal International.

== Election results ==
=== Presidential elections ===
Election Year	Candidate	First Round		Second Round		Result
Election Year	Candidate	Votes	Percentage	Votes	Percentage	Result
2006	Supported Álvaro Uribe	7,363,421	62.35 (#1)			Won
2010	Juan Manuel Santos	6,802,043	46.68 (#1)	9,028,943	69.13 (#1)	Won
2014	Juan Manuel Santos	3,301,815	25.69 (#2)	7,816,986	50.95 (#1)	Won
2018	Germán Vargas Lleras	1,407,840	7.28 (#4)			Lost
2022	Federico Gutiérrez	5,069,448	23.94 (#3)			Lost

=== Legislative elections ===
Election Year	House of Representatives			Senate		
Election Year	Votes	Percentage	Seats	Votes	Percentage	Seats
2006	1,453,353	16.75 (#2)	29 / 163	1,015,523	17.49 (#1)	20 / 102
2010	2,469,489	26.11 (#1)	48 / 162	2,804,123	25.84 (#1)	28 / 102
2014	2,297,786	19.61 (#1)	38 / 166	2,230,208	19.11 (#1)	21 / 102
2018	1,840,481	12.74 (#4)	25 / 166	1,853,054	12.80 (#5)	14 / 102
2022	1,506,567	8.87 (#7)	15 / 188	1,439,579	12.80 (#6)	10 / 102
2026	1,043,537	5.55 (#5)	11 / 161	1,553,639	7.98 (#6)	9 / 103
