= Democratic Hope =

Democratic Hope Esperanza Democrática
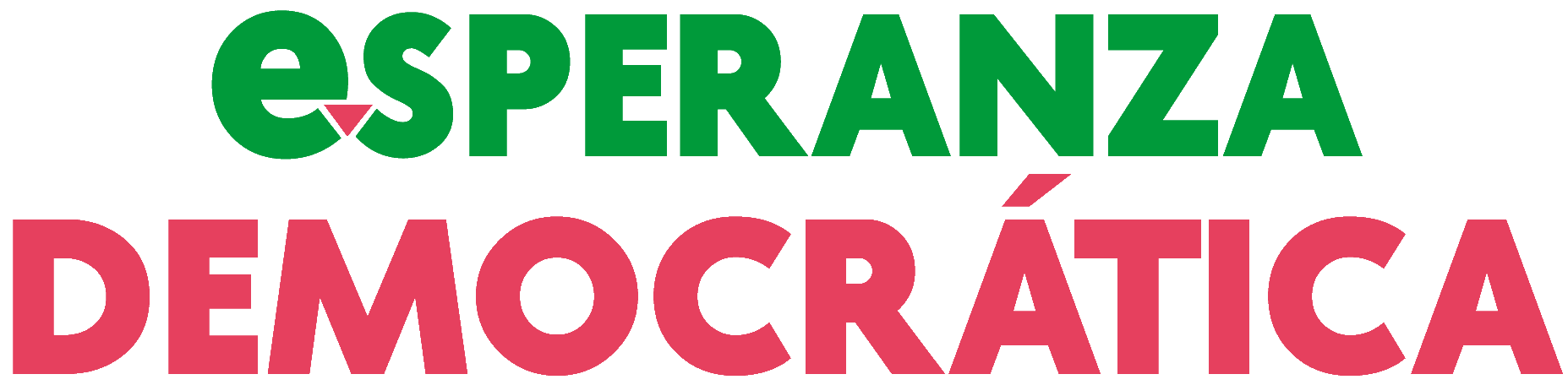
- Founded: 1991 (first iteration); 2023 (refoundation)
- Dissolved: 2000 (first iteration)
- Preceded by: EPL
- Ideology: Democratic socialism Antifascism
- Political position: Left-wing
- National affiliation: Historic Pact for Colombia
- Colors: Red; Blue; Yellow

Website
- https://www.facebook.com/EsperanzaDemocraticaColombia/?locale=es_LA

Democratic Hope (Spanish: Esperanza Democrática), formerly known as Hope, Peace and Liberty (EPL, for Esperanza, Paz y Libertad) is a left-wing political party in Colombia. The party was created in 1991, when the guerrillas Popular Liberation Army (Ejército Popular de Liberación or EPL) demobilized. The demobilized members formed a party, and kept the initialism EPL in forming Hope, Peace and Liberty. The party was active mostly in Antioquia Department and Córdoba Department. However, some maverick remnants of the guerrilla still operate as such.

== History ==
While most members of the Popular Liberation Army demobilized and joined Hope, Peace, and Liberty, some members refused to demobilize and formed the Popular Liberation Army - Dissident Line (Ejército Popular de Liberación - Línea Disidente). This violent splinter group has killed Hope, Peace, and Liberty members, whom they consider traitors to the revolutionary cause. The Revolutionary Armed Forces of Colombia—People's Army (FARC-EP) and the National Liberation Army (ELN) likewise consider Hope, Peace, and Liberty to be enemies of their revolutions; according to a report by Human Rights Watch, "the FARC and its urban militias were believed responsible for 204 murders of Esperanza members and amnestied EPL guerrillas from 1991 to 1995."

=== Refoundation ===
On the 1st of March 2023, the National Electoral Council decided to return legal status to both "Hope, Peace, and Liberty", New Democratic Force (former President Andrés Pastrana's party) and the Independent movement of the mayor of Medellín, Daniel Quintero.

In the case of the EPL's successor, the party originally suffered a campaign of extermination, however as the party is the product of a peace agreement between the EPL and the government, this prevented an effective exercise of political rights as laid out in the said agreement.

In April, 2023, the party was renamed Esperanza Democrática, "Democratic Hope".
