= Democratic Centre (Colombia) =

Democratic Centre Centro Democrático
- Leader: Álvaro Uribe
- President: Gabriel Vallejo
- Spokesperson: Paloma Valencia
- Founded: 20 January 2013; 13 years ago (as a political movement); 15 July 2014; 12 years ago (as a political party)
- Split from: Social Party of National Unity
- Headquarters: Calle 66 No. 7 – 59, Quinta Camacho, Bogotá
- Membership (2026): 685,000
- Ideology: Conservatism (Colombian); Economic liberalism Right-wing populism
- Political position: Right-wing to far-right
- Regional affiliation: Union of Latin American Parties
- European affiliation: European Conservatives and Reformists Party (regional partner, until 2022)
- International affiliation: Centrist Democrat International
- Colors: Blue
- Slogan: Mano firme, corazón grande ('Firm hand, big heart')
- Chamber of Representatives: 30 / 188
- Senate: 17 / 108
- Governors: 4 / 32
- Mayors: 154 / 1,102

Website
- www.centrodemocratico.com

Democratic Centre (identified electorally as Democratic Centre – Firm Hand, Big Heart; Spanish: Centro Democrático – Mano firme, corazón grande) is a conservative and right-wing populist political party in Colombia. It was founded in 2013 by Álvaro Uribe, former President of Colombia, former Vice President Francisco Santos Calderón and former Minister of Finance and Public Credit Óscar Iván Zuluaga. The party is right-wing to far-right.

== History ==
The party was born due to the estrangement between Juan Manuel Santos and President Álvaro Uribe. Santos served as Minister of Defense during the Uribe administration. In 2005, Santos was one of the principal founders of the Social Party of National Unity (Party of the U), which was created by supporters of Álvaro Uribe and supported Uribe's re-election in 2006.

However, after Santos won the 2010 presidential election, Santos made multiple decisions which displeased Uribe, such as increasing diplomatic relations with neighbors like Venezuela and advocating for a more moderate political course. Uribe was particularly critical of Santos's peace talks with the far-left guerrilla group FARC starting in 2011. The Democratic Centre party was formally established on 20 January 2013 as a political vehicle for Uribe's supporters and became the main opposition force to Santos, particularly regarding the FARC peace process and Santos's 2014 re-election bid.

During the 2020 United States elections, Democratic Centre promoted Republican Party candidates in the United States, especially in Florida, sharing their support for the President of the United States, Donald Trump. The party's involvement with promoting political candidates in a foreign election drew controversy among some observers.

With President Iván Duque's unpopularity rate reaching 70%, the government was faced with the largest demonstrations in the country's history from 2019 to 2020. Demonstrators opposed the government's plans to make the labour market more flexible, weaken the public pension fund in favour of private entities, and raise the retirement age. Labor unions also protested against the tax reform, which aimed to reduce the taxes paid by companies, and against the privatisation under way. Major protests also erupted in 2021. In 2022, the party declared it was in opposition to the left-wing presidency of Gustavo Petro.

The party was considered a regional partner of European Conservatives and Reformists Party until 2022.

== Ideology ==
Although created as a decidedly right-wing party, its members now come from a wide range of political backgrounds, including former politicians of the right-wing Conservative Party, the center-right Social Party of National Unity, and from the left-wing Alternative Democratic Pole, such as Senator Everth Bustamante.

The party is a strong advocate of economic liberalism. It intends to lower corporate taxation and further liberalise the economy in order to attract international investors, particularly to promote the exploitation of natural resources. It is also strongly focused on domestic security, including the elimination of terrorist threats, and promoting social cohesion.

On international policy issues, the party is pro-American.

== Election results ==
In the 2014 congressional elections, the Democratic Centre won 20 seats in the Senate and 19 seats in the Chamber of Representatives.

In the 2014 presidential election, the Democratic Centre chose Óscar Iván Zuluaga, the Senator and Finance Minister during the Uribe Administration, as its presidential nominee. Zuluaga won the first round, but subsequently lost the second round to incumbent President Santos.

Despite the second round loss, the electoral performance in both congressional and presidential elections provided the Democratic Centre with a platform to establish itself as the major opposition party in Colombia. The party has since taken steps to improve its political infrastructure given that it lagged in funding and party organisation compared to more traditional political parties.

=== Presidential elections ===
Election Year	Candidate	Running mate	First Round		Second Round		Result
Election Year	Candidate	Running mate	Votes	Percentage	Votes	Percentage	Result
2014	Óscar Iván Zuluaga	Carlos Holmes Trujillo	3,759,971	29.25 (#1)	6,905,001	45.00 (#2)	Lost
2018	Iván Duque Márquez	Marta Lucía Ramírez	7,569,693	39.14 (#1)	10,373,080	53.98 (#1)	Won
2026	Paloma Valencia	Juan Daniel Oviedo	1,640,989	6.93 (#3)	—N/a	—N/a	Lost

=== Legislative elections ===
Election Year	House of Representatives			Senate		
Election Year	Votes	Percentage	Seats	Votes	Percentage	Seats
2014	1,355,358	11.57 (#4)	19 / 166	2,045,564	17.52 (#2)	19 / 102
2018	2,471,596	16.53 (#2)	35 / 166	2,513,320	17.36 (#1)	19 / 102
2022	1,610,666	9.86 (#5)	16 / 188	1,917,153	11.42 (#5)	13 / 108
2026	2,527,214	13.44 (#3)	24 / 161	3,072,388	15.77 (#2)	17 / 103
