= 2026 Colombian presidential election =

- 31 May 2026 (first round); 21 June 2026 (second round)
- Opinion polls
- Turnout: 57.89% (first round) ▲2.91pp 63.60% (second round) ▲5.43pp
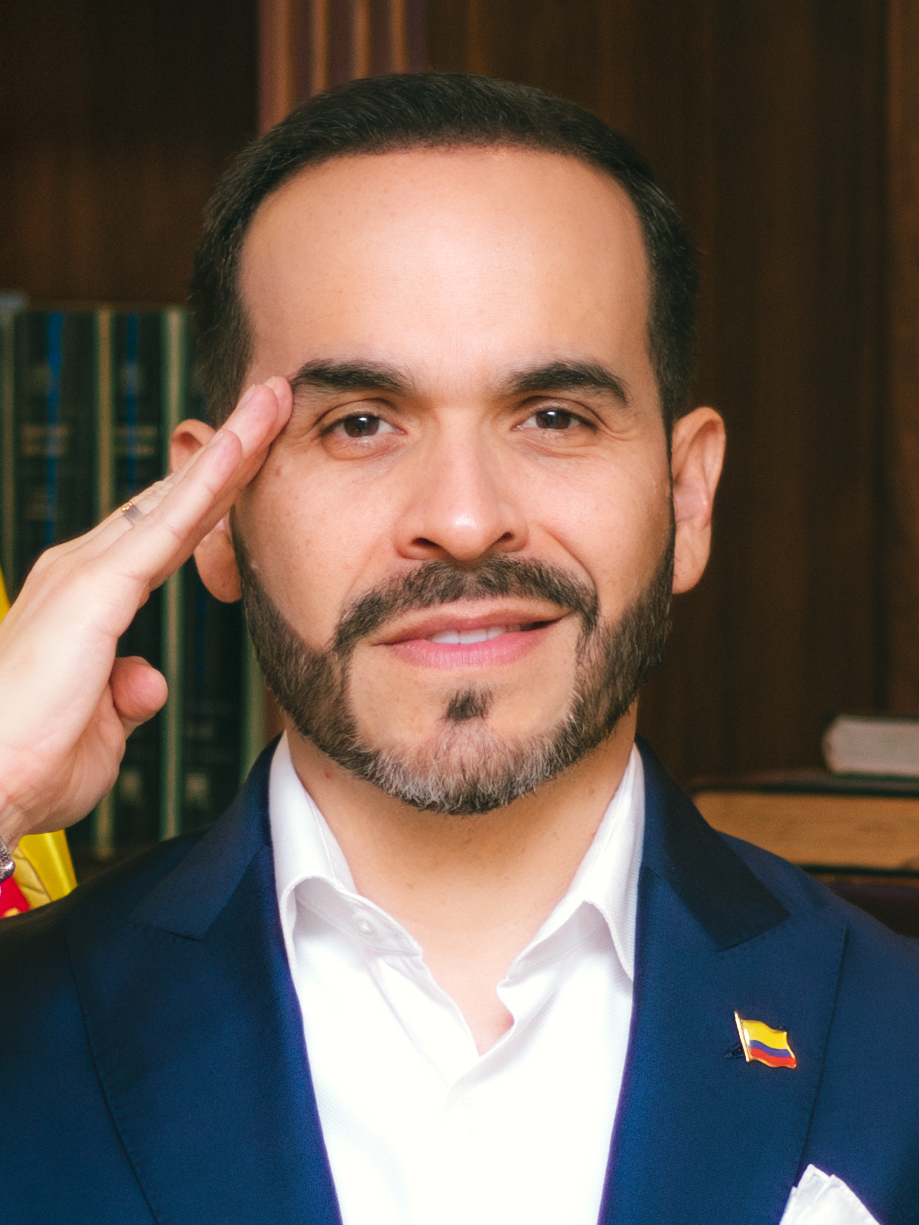

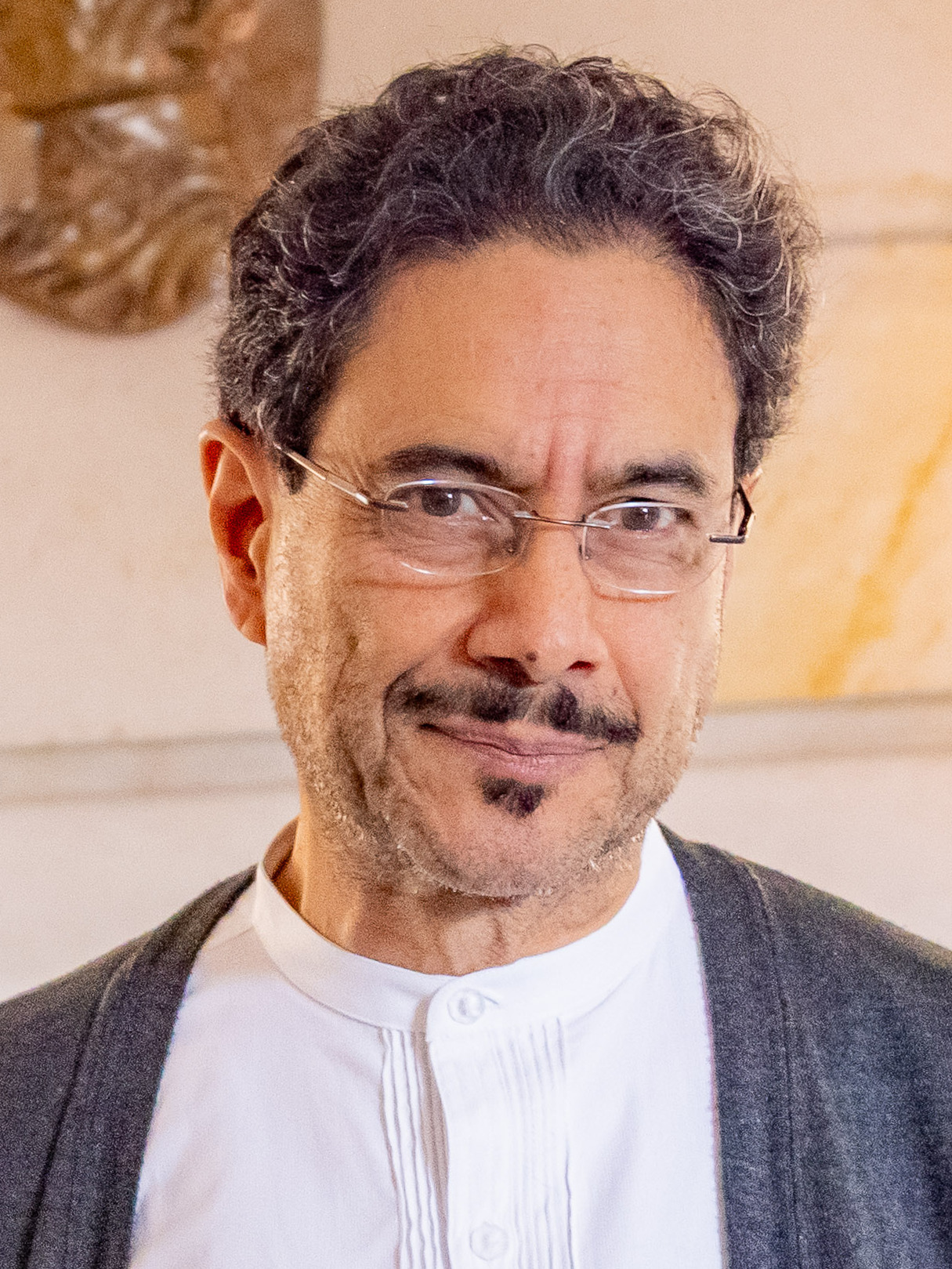
Candidate	Abelardo de la Espriella	Iván Cepeda
Party	National Salvation	Historic Pact
Alliance	Defenders of the Homeland	Alliance for Life
Running mate	José Manuel Restrepo	Aida Quilcué
Popular vote	12,960,166	12,708,312
Percentage	49.66%	48.70%
President before election
Gustavo Petro
Historic Pact
Elected President
Abelardo de la Espriella
Defenders of the Homeland

Presidential elections were held in Colombia on 31 May 2026. Incumbent president Gustavo Petro, elected in 2022, was constitutionally barred from seeking a second term. Abelardo de la Espriella defeated Iván Cepeda by less than 1% in the run-off election held on 21 June 2026.

In the first round, de la Espriella led with 43.7% of the vote, followed by Cepeda with 40.9%. As none of the thirteen candidates obtained at least 50% of the vote in the first round, a run-off was held. The run-off was narrowly won by de la Espriella with 49.66% of the vote against 48.70% obtained by Cepeda. With 12.9 million votes, de la Espriella became the most voted presidential candidate in Colombian history. Cepeda conceded the election on 24 June 2026, and hours later, Petro – while alleging fraud and foreign interference – also recognized the results, announcing that his administration would begin the formal handover process. The election was noted for a continuing trend of right-wing victories across Latin America.

== Background ==
In the previous presidential election in 2022, as none of the presidential nominees obtained at least 50% of the votes in the first round, a run-off was held between the top two candidates, Gustavo Petro and Rodolfo Hernández Suárez. Petro won the run-off, becoming the first left-wing candidate to be elected president of Colombia since the country's independence in 1810. The results for the second round saw the lowest record of spoiled and blank ballots in over twenty years and a turnout of 58.17%, the highest since 1998.

Since taking office, Petro and his allies have been involved in several scandals. One scandal, nicknamed "Nannygate", involved the publishing of recordings of then-ambassador to Venezuela, Armando Benedetti, speaking with Petro's Chief of Staff, Laura Sarabia, about possible illegal financing and threats of revealing compromising information on campaign rivals. Both were forced to resign from their positions as a result. The scandal lowered approval of Petro, being viewed by the public as an indication of corruption inside the government. His presidential approval rating dropped to a low of 26% in July 2023 according to a Datexco survey.

In 2025, Petro fired his entire cabinet to reassess his previous choices in light of his appointment of Armando Benedetti as Chief of Staff and promotion of thirty-year-old Laura Sarabia to Foreign Minister; both were embroiled in a campaign finance scandal. His key labor and health-care reforms stalling at the legislative branch, the arrest of his son in a money laundering scandal involving campaign financing, and the scandal involving his ministers contributed to a decrease in public support for the president. However, Petro's approval ratings rebounded significantly, reaching 49% approval as recently as February 2026.

His presidency has been characterized by a progressive economic policy, including a substantial increase in the minimum wage, strengthening of the legal framework for labor rights, redistribution of land to peasants, and higher social spending. Poverty and unemployment have declined, but his opponents point to a rise in public debt. He is ending his term with an approval rating of about 50%, compared with a disapproval rating of 43%.

== Electoral system ==
Colombian presidents are elected for four-year terms using a two-round system; if no candidate receives a majority of the vote in the first round, a runoff is held between the top two candidates. The vice president is elected on the same ticket as the president. Presidents are limited to a single four-year term, and Article 191 of the constitution requires candidates to be Colombian by birth and at least thirty years old. In line with the constitution, Colombian citizens by birth or by naturalization, aged eighteen or older have the right to vote. Several scenarios can cause the loss of the right to vote, as outlined in the constitution. Citizens in detention centers can vote from the establishments determined by the National Civil Registry. The civil registry inscription is not automatic, and citizens must go to the regional office of the registry to register. Legislative Act No. 2 of 2015 established that the runner-up in the presidential elections is given a seat in the Senate and their vice president candidate becomes a member of the Chamber of Representatives.

In order to be accepted as a candidate, applicants must either have the backing of a recognized political party in order to run as their official candidate, or to collect a minimum number of signatures in order to run as an independent candidate.

== Candidates ==
=== Historic Pact ===
Cepeda announced his candidacy in July 2025 and was considered one of the initial favorites for the presidential nomination of the Historic Pact in the polls. Cepeda initially competed against six other pre-candidates, four of whom later withdrew, leaving him to face Minister Carolina Corcho and former mayor of Medellín, Daniel Quintero, in the primary election.

Following his victory in the primary election in October 2025, Cepeda officially became the presidential candidate of the Historic Pact. Carolina Corcho, who received the second-highest number of votes, became the lead candidate for the Senate in the 2026 parliamentary elections in March.

After obtaining an overwhelming majority during the parliamentary election on March 8, Cepeda would announce Aida Quilcué as the candidate for vice president on Monday, March 9.

2026 Historic Pact ticket
Iván Cepeda	Aida Quilcué
for President	for Vice President
Senator (2014–present)	Senator (2022–present)

=== Democratic Centre ===
Paloma Valencia became the official candidate of the Democratic Center after winning by a wide margin among the delegates, defeating her opponent, Senator María Fernanda Cabal. Valencia also competed in the national primary election on March 8 during the 2026 parliamentary election, where she obtained a significant majority with 3,236,286 votes, surpassing her eight fellow candidates.

Valencia announced her vice-presidential candidate on Thursday, March 12, revealing Juan Daniel Oviedo, who obtained 1,255,510 votes, the second highest vote count during the national primary election.

2026 Democratic Centre ticket
Paloma Valencia	Juan Daniel Oviedo
for President	for Vice President
Senator (2014–present)	General Director National Administrative Department of Statistics (2018–2022)

=== Defenders of the Homeland ===
Political newcomer and lawyer Abelardo de la Espriella represents the opposition Defenders of the Motherland movement. Nicknamed "The Tiger," de la Espriella's campaign focused on security and received an endorsement from U.S. President Donald Trump. His platform included plans related to combating criminal organizations.

2026 Defenders of the Homeland ticket
Abelardo de la Espriella	José Manuel Restrepo
for President	for Vice President
Businessman (2002–present)	Minister of Finance and Public Credit (2021–2022)

=== Dignity and Commitment ===
2026 Dignity and Commitment ticket
Sergio Fajardo	Edna Bonilla
for President	for Vice President
Governor of Antioquia (2012–2016)	Secretary of Education of Bogotá (2020–2023)

=== Other parties and candidates ===
Party/coalition	Presidential candidate	Origin	Experience
The Force of Peace	Roy Barreras	Valle del Cauca	Member of the Chamber of Representatives (2006–2010); Senator (2010–2023); President of the Senate (2012–2013, 2022–2023)
New Liberalism	Juan Manuel Galán	Bogotá	Senator (2006–2018)
Independent (Brave Movement)	Vicky Dávila	Valle del Cauca	Director of Semana (2020–2024)
Independent (Yes, There Is a Way)	David Luna	Bogotá, D.C.	Member of the Chamber of Representatives (2006–2010); Minister of Information Technologies and Communications (2015–2018); Senator (2022–2025)
Independent	Santiago Botero	Antioquia	Businessman
Oxygen Green Party	Juan Carlos Pinzón	Bogotá	Minister of National Defence (2011–2015); General Secretary of the Presidency (2010–2011)
Movement in Motion	Juan Fernando Cristo	Norte de Santander	Minister of Interior (2024–2025), (2014–2017); President of the Senate (2013–2014); Senator (1998–2014)
Indigenous Authorities of Colombia	Daniel Quintero	Antioquia	Mayor of Medellín (2020–2023); Deputy Minister of the Digital Economy (2016–2017)
Independent	Claudia López	Bogotá, D.C.	Senator (2014–2018); Mayor of Bogotá (2020–2024)
Independent	Luis Gilberto Murillo	Chocó	Minister of Foreign Affairs (2024–2025); Minister of Environment and Sustainable Development (2016–2018); Governor of Chocó (1998–1999), (2012)
Independent	Mauricio Lizcano	Antioquia	Member of the Chamber of Representatives (2006–2010); Senator (2010–2018); Minister of Information Technologies and Communications (2023–2025); President of the Senate (2016–2017)
Independent	Mauricio Cárdenas	Bogotá, D.C.	Minister of Finance and Public Credit (2012–2018); Minister of Mines and Energy (2011–2012); Minister of Transport (1998–1999); Minister of Economic Development (1994)

=== Declined or deceased candidates ===
- Francia Márquez (Soy Porque Somos), incumbent vice president
- Miguel Uribe Turbay (Democratic Centre), assassinated senator

== Opinion polls ==
=== Second round ===
==== De la Espriella vs. Cepeda ====
Pollster	Fieldwork date + /–			Lead
Pollster	Fieldwork date + /–	Iván Cepeda PH	Abelardo de la Espriella MSN	Lead
CNC	6–13 June 2026	44.7%	48.6%	3.9%
AtlasIntel/Semana	9–11 June 2026	44.4%	52.4%	8.0%
Guarumo/Ecoanalitica	8–11 June 2026	45%	52.6%	7.6%
AtlasIntel/Semana	5–10 June 2026	44.5%	52.2%	7.7%
AtlasIntel / Semana	1–2 June 2026	42.6%	50.3%	7.7%
AtlasIntel / Semana	1–2 June 2026	44.47%	52.51%	8.04%
	31 May 2026	Cepeda and Espriella advance to the second round		
CNC	15–22 May 2026	40.9%	43.6%	2.7%
AtlasIntel/Semana	18–21 May 2026	41.3%	50.0%	8.7%
Invamer	13–20 May 2026	52.4%	45.3%	7.1%
AtlasIntel/Semana	11–14 May 2026	40.4%	44.0%	3.6%
Fundación Génesis Crea	4–11 May 2026	46.5%	41.4%	5.1%
Invamer	15–24 April 2026	54.6%	42.6%	12.0%
GAD3	20–22 April 2026	46.0%	35.0%	11.0%
AtlasIntel	6–9 April 2026	39.8%	48.8%	9%
CNC	17–21 March 2026	48.1%	35.5%	12.6%
GAD3	16–18 March 2026	45.0%	36.0%	9.0%
AtlasIntel/SEMANA	10–12 March 2026	39.2%	43.5%	4.3%
Invamer	11–22 February 2026	59.4%	37.4%	20.0%
CELAG	February 2026	45.3%	38.4%	6.9%
AtlasIntel/SEMANA	27 January – 4 February 2026	34.6%	36.8%	2.2%
CNC	15–21 January 2026	45.2%	25.7%	19.5%

=== First round ===
==== 2026 ====
The CNE suspended AtlasIntel's polls (partnered with Semana) on May 19, 2026, over concerns that invalid methodologies led to biased election reporting. Specific irregularities included digital exclusion bias, model-dependent estimation, inconsistent data, quality control failures, and candidate popularity relative inflation. The ban was lifted on May 21 for procedural reasons (lack of quorum), but the technical probe remains ongoing.

Fieldwork date	Pollsters	^{Sample}	^{Margin of error}															Blank (Note: Under Article 258 of the Colombian Constitution, as regulated by Law 1475 of 2011, the blank vote (voto en blanco) is considered a valid vote. It is a decisive factor in the first round, as a candidate must secure an absolute majority (50% plus one) of all valid votes to win outright. If the blank vote exceeds 50% of the total valid votes cast, the election must be repeated with an entirely new slate of candidates. Historically, however, the blank vote rarely exceeds 1.75% in the first round. While polls consistently include these figures, excluding blank, null, and undecided responses often provides a clearer reflection of candidate standing; historical data suggests that many self-identified "blank" voters are, in practice, undecided voters who eventually select a candidate.)	Void	Undecided	Lead
Fieldwork date	Pollsters	^{Sample}	^{Margin of error}	Iván Cepeda PH	Abelardo de la Espriella MSN	Paloma Valencia CD	Sergio Fajardo D&C	Claudia López IC	Santiago Botero RS	Miguel Londoño CD	Roy Barreras LF	Carlos Caicedo FC	Luis Murillo CR	Mauricio Lizcano ASI	Sondra Macollins AM	Gustavo Camacho PEC	Clara López ED^{(withdrawn) (Note: Clara López Obregón officially withdrew her candidacy after the final registration deadline. Consequently, her name and photo will remain on the official ballot for the first round. However, any votes cast for her will be considered void.)}	Blank	Void	Undecided	Lead
31 May 2026	^{E-14 Preliminary rapid count}^{Thomas Greg & Sons}	^{23,982,304} 57.89%	~3.0%^{(Historical)}	^{9,688,361} 40.90%	^{10,661,499} 43.75%	^{1,639,685} 6.92%	^{1,009,073} 4.26%	^{225,517} 0.95%	^{206,140} 0.87%	^{28,657} 0.12%	^{14,108} 0.05%	^{12,694} 0.05%	^{13,270} 0.05%	^{53,738} 0.22%	^{19,889} 0.08%	^{5,627} 0.02%	—	^{406,970} 1.72%	^{292,975} 1.22%	—N/a	2.84%
13–20 May 2026	Invamer	2,224	2.44%	44.6%	31.6%	14.0%	2.2%	2.4%	1.4%	0.4%	0.3%	0.4%	0.4%	0.5%	0.2%	0.2%	—N/a	2.0%	—N/a	—N/a	13.0%
13–20 May 2026	^{Decision of vote}	2,356	2.19%	88.8%															—	11.2%	—
9–14 May 2026	AtlasIntel/SEMANA	5,039	1%	36.0%	31.5%	16.0%	4.7%	3.4%	0.4%	0.0%	0.1%	0.3%	0.0%	0.1%	0.0%	0.1%	—	3.1%	2.1%	2.2%	4.5%
4–11 May 2026	Fundación Génesis Crea	4,352	1.48%	35.1%	21.6%	25.4%	2.9%	3.6%	0.7%	0.8%	0.7%	0.2%	—	0.2%	0.1%	0.1%	—	3.2%	—	5.4%	13.5%
15–24 April 2026	Invamer	3,800	2%	44.3%	21.5%	19.8%	2%	3%	0.8%	0.6%	0.1%	0.2%	0.4%	0.1%	0.1%	0.0%	—N/a	4.8%	—N/a	—N/a	22.8%
20–22 April 2026	GAD3	1,500	2%	36.0%	21.0%	13.0%	2.5%	3.6%	1.4%	0.4%	0.1%	0.4%	0.4%	0.4%	0.2%	0.0%	—N/a	4.8%	—N/a	17.0%	15.0%
6–9 April 2026	Atlas Intel/SEMANA	3,617	2%	40.82%	29.43%	24.79%	5.38%	1.05%	0.63%	0%	0.32%	0%	0%	0%	0.11%	0%	0%	—N/a	—N/a	—N/a	11.39%
6–9 April 2026	Atlas Intel/SEMANA	3,617	2%	38.84%	27.95%	23.53%	5.14%	1.03%	0.62%	0%	0.31	0%	0%	0%	0.1%	0%	0%	2.5%	—N/a	—N/a	10.89%
6–9 April 2026	Atlas Intel/SEMANA	3,617	2%	37.8%	27.2%	22.9%	5%	1%	0.6%	0%	0.3%	0%	0%	0%	0.1%	0%	0%	2.5%	0.7%	2%	10.6%
20 March 2026	The Electoral Tribunal finalized the list of the 14 first-round candidates. (Note: Notes on March 2026 Polling Data: ¹ Researchs' fieldwork: The 12 electoral polls included in the table below—published between January and early April 2026—utilized fieldwork and data collection concluded prior to the March 20 final candidate registration deadline. While these surveys do not perfectly match the finalized field of 14 candidates, those excluded were minor candidates with support levels averaging less than 1% (typically between 0.1% and 0.5%). Additionally, this data reflects the following electoral dynamics: ² Candidate Withdrawal: Clara López officially withdrew her candidacy after being confirmed on the final ballot to support Iván Cepeda. While her name remains on the legal ballot, her polling figures reflect her status prior to this withdrawal. ³ Blank Votes: While the "Blank Vote" (voto en blanco) is a valid legal option in Colombia, it has historically averaged only 1.5%–1.7% in first-round elections. Data suggests that many respondents who initially select "blank" or "null" are effectively undecided and often choose a candidate by election day. ⁴ Adjusted Projections: In several polls, calculating percentages by excluding blank, null, and undecided responses provides a clearer reflection of the leading candidates' potential to secure an absolute majority or qualify for a second round.)																				
March 2026	CELAG	---	---	47.84%	18.25%	24.68%	—N/a	—N/a	—N/a	—N/a	—N/a	—N/a	—N/a	—N/a	—N/a	—N/a	—N/a	—N/a	—N/a	—N/a	23.16%
March 2026	CELAG	---	---	40.9%	15.4%	21.1%	3.6%	1.6%	0.4%	—N/a	0.3%	—N/a	0.2%	0.2%	0%	—N/a	0.9%	7%	3.2%	4.3%	19.8%
19–25 March 2026	Guarumo/EcoAnalítica	3,736	±2.2 pp	42.1%	22.7%	22.4%	—N/a	—N/a	—N/a	—N/a	—N/a	—N/a	—N/a	—N/a	—N/a	—N/a	—N/a	—N/a	—N/a	—N/a	19.4%
19–25 March 2026	Guarumo/EcoAnalítica	3,736	±2.2 pp	37.5%	20.2%	19.9%	3.9%	2.3%	1.5%	1.3%	0.6%	0.8%	0.2%	0.2%	0%	0.1%	0.5%	11%	—N/a	—N/a	17.3%
17–21 March 2026	CNC	2,157	±3 pp	41.27%	18.42%	26.56%	—N/a	—N/a	—N/a	—N/a	—N/a	—N/a	—N/a	—N/a	—N/a	—N/a	—N/a	—N/a	—N/a	—N/a	14.47%
17–21 March 2026	CNC	2,157	±3 pp	34.5%	15.4%	22.2%	3.6%	3.7%	1.3%	1%	0.5%	0.1%	0.2%	0.2%	0.4%	0.2%	0.3%	6.5%	1.9%	8%	12.3%
16–18 March 2026	Noticias RCN /Gad3	1,200	±3 pp	43.21%	25.93%	19.75%	—N/a	—N/a	—N/a	—N/a	—N/a	—N/a	—N/a	—N/a	—N/a	—N/a	—N/a	—N/a	—N/a	—N/a	17.28%
16–18 March 2026	Noticias RCN /Gad3	1,200	±3 pp	35%	21%	16%	3%	4%	1%	1%	0.1%	0.3%	1%	0.1%	—N/a	—N/a	0.2%	6%	6%	7%	15%
10–12 March 2026	AtlasIntel/SEMANA	4,291	±2 pp	36.4%	27.9%	17.5%	7.8%	1.7%	0.6%	0%	0.9%	—N/a	0.7%	0%	0.1%	0.9%	1.2%	3.3% _{(Incl.)}	1% _{(Exc.)}	2.9% _{(Excluded)}	8.5%
11–22 February 2026	Invamer	3,800	±1.93 pp	37.1%	18.9%	10%	6.6%	11.7%	2.2%	1.8%	1.8%	0.7%	—N/a	0.4%	0.3%	—N/a	2.8%	2.4%	—N/a	—N/a	18.2%
February 2026	CELAG	---	---	46.41%	30.62%	—N/a	—N/a	—N/a	—N/a	—N/a	—N/a	—N/a	—N/a	—N/a	—N/a	—N/a	—N/a	—N/a	—N/a	—N/a	15.79%
February 2026	CELAG	---	---	38.2%	25.2%	4.6%	4.4%	0.8%	—N/a	—N/a	1%	0.5%	—N/a	—N/a	—N/a	—N/a	0.7%	9.6%		8.1%	13%
27 January – 4 February 2026	AtlasIntel/SEMANA	7,298	±1 pp	31.4%	32.1%	3.8%	7.6%	3.7%	—N/a	2.1%	0.3%	—N/a	—N/a	—N/a	—N/a	—N/a	—N/a	5.3%	—N/a	7.7% _{(Excluded)}	0.7%
15–21 January 2026	CNC/Cambio	2,202	±2.9 pp	28.2%	15.5%	—N/a	9.8%	3.7%	—N/a	—N/a	0.3%	0.9%	—N/a	—N/a	—N/a	—N/a	—N/a	2.3%	16.1%	7.5%	12.7%
14–22 January 2026	Guarumo/EcoAnalítica	4,245	±1.8 pp	33.6%	18.2%	6.9%	3.9%	2.4%	1%	—N/a	0 7%%	0.4%	0.4%	0.2%	—N/a	—N/a	0.8%	—N/a	—N/a	13%	15.4%
13–15 January 2026	Noticias RCN/Gad3	1,207	±2.83 pp	30%	22%	3%	1%	0.4%	1%	—N/a	1%	—N/a	—N/a	0.1%	—N/a	—N/a	—N/a	5%	11%	14%	8%
5–8 January 2026	AtlasIntel/SEMANA	4,550	±1 pp	26.5%	28.0%	5.1%	9.4%	2.6%	—N/a	—N/a	0.2%%	—N/a	—N/a	—N/a	—N/a	—N/a	—N/a	7.2%	1.1%	5.7%	1.5%

==== 2025 ====
Fieldwork date	Pollsters	Sample	Bolívar PH	Cepeda PH	Corcho PH	Muhamad PH	Pizarro PH	Quintero PH	Cabal CD	Uribe Turbay † CD	Uribe Londoño CD	Valencia CD	de la Espriella Ind.	Fajardo D&C	Dávila Ind.	Galán NL	Cepeda PCC	Cristo Ind.	Gaviria Ind.	Gómez PLC	Hernández AV	López Ind.	Luna Ind.	Murillo Ind.	Oviedo Ind.	Pinzón PVO	Vargas CR	Zuluaga Ind.	Others	Blank	None	Don't know/No answer
13–17 Dec	W.A.A	11509	-	30.7%	-	-	-	-	4.1%	-	2.3%	0.7%	16.2%	6.7%	3.6%	1.6%	1.2%	-	0.4%	-	-	3.5%	1.2%	1.2%	1.5%	0.7%	3.1%	-	2.7%	11.8%	-	-
15–27 Nov	Invamer	2080	-	31.9%	-	-	-	-	1.1%	-	4.2%	1.1%	18.2%	8.5%	3.7%	1.6%	0.7%	0.2%	1.3%	0.4%	-	4.1%	0.6%	0.9%	0.5%	2.9%	2.1%	-	6.6%	4.5%	-	-
10–15 Nov	Yamil Cure S.A.S	2250	–	19.6%	–	–	–	5.2%	–	–	5.0%	–	15.6%	10.6%	4.2%	5.2%	–	–	–	–	–	7.1%	–	–	–	2.2%	2.9%	–	1.1%	6.4%	–	13.7%
6–14 Nov	CNC	2140	-	20.9%	-	-	-	1.8%	0.9%	-	4.1%	-	14.4%	7.8%	3.2%	3.3%	-	-	1.0%	-	-	5.0%	0.3%	-	1.7%	0.6%	1.6%	-	1.3%	3.7%	18.5%	7.5%
11–16 Oct	CNC	1803	-	8.0%	8.1%	-	-	2.5%	1.5%	-	9.7%	0.4%	13.7%	8.9%	6.4%	2.6%	0.1%	-	1.1%	0.1%	-	5.5%	1.7%	-	1.6%	1.5%	2.8%	1.2%	1.3%	3.2%	9.9%	5.3%
11 August 2025			Death of Miguel Uribe Turbay																													
1–5 Jul	Guarumo	2122	10.5%	2.1%	2.4%	1.7%	3.2%	8.1%	1.9%	13.7%	-	0.7%	1.1%	8.7%	11.5%	3.0%	-	-	-	-	2.5%	5.3%	1.2%	0.5%	2.2%	-	2.9%	0.4%	2.9%	-	5.3%	3.5%
21–26 Apr	Guarumo	2159	12.6%	3.5%	2.5%	-	2.6%	3.8%	4.6%	4.5%	-	1.0%	-	11.4%	11.6%	4.0%	-	-	-	-	-	4.7%	1.2%	-	1.5%	-	5.6%	0.3%	2.3%	7.2%	5.9%	4.2%
21–25 Mar	Invamer	1200	11.8%	4.1%	0.9%	1.1%	3.7%	4.7%	4.2%	4.8%	-	0.8%	1.7%	9.5%	8.3%	7.8%	-	0.5%	-	-	3.8%	6.8%	0.9%	0.3%	0.4%	0.6%	7.3%	-	-	4.1%	-	–
18–20 Mar	CNC	1594	10.1%	3.6%	-	-	7.4%	6.2%	2.1%	6.9%	-	-	1.1%	13.4%	13.6%	7.6%	-	-	-	-	3.0%	9.5%	-	-	-	0.4%	7.9%	-	0.9%	2.8%	9.9%	2.9%
10–13 Feb	Guarumo	2140	11.9%	2.1%	2.2%	1.0%	4.1%	3.1%	3.5%	3.0%	-	1.2%	-	11.5%	15.1%	4.0%	-	0.2%	-	-	3.3%	4.6%	1.3%	0.8%	1.4%	0.4%	5.2%	0.5%	0.9%	7.1%	4.7%	2.7%
27–29 Jan	CNC	1513	6.7%	-	3.1%	-	4.3%	4.7%	5.6%	-	-	-	-	11.8%	12.7%	7.8%	-	-	-	-	-	6.9%	1.7%	1.8%	4.8%	-	6.2%	-	-	5.0%	9.7%	2.1%

==== 2024 ====
Fieldwork date	Pollsters	Sample	Candidates																						Lead
Fieldwork date	Pollsters	Sample	Dávila	Galán	Fajardo	López	Cabal	Botero	Pizarro	Gaviria	Quintero	Márquez	Vargas	Bolívar	Oviedo	Uribe	Noguera	Muhamad	Murillo	Valencia	Others	Blank	Don't know/No answer	None	Lead
9 – 12 December	Guarumo/EcoAnalítica	2018	13.1%	5.0%	14.5%	5.7%	3.0%	0.4%	3.7%	0.7%	2.8%	–	5.0%	8.9%	1.5%	3.2%	–	0.3%	0.3%	0.8%	–	5.6%	3.6%	7.7%	2.2%
22 – 26 November	Invamer	1200	8.6%	7.3%	15.4%	12,6%	1,6%	–	4.1%	–	6.1%	–	9.2%	8.6%	5.5%	3.1%	–	1.2%	4.5%	0.9%	2.7%	6.3%	–	17.4%	2.83%
18 – 21 November	CNC	2000	11.4%	10.0%	13.4%	9.7%	5.8%	–	6.8%	2.5%	5.0%	–	8.0%	6.5%	–	4.2%	–	–	3.1%	–	–	2.4%	1.9%	9.4%	2.7%
25 – 28 October	Invamer	1504	7.7%	9.7%	10.5%	10.9%	3.6%	–	5.1%	–	2.6%	4.9%	4.3%	6.5%	–	5.4%	–	–	1.4%	–	1.1%	0.6%	7.5%	12.9%	2.53%
7 – 11 September	Guarumo/EcoAnalítica	2012	12.2%	5.6%	10.1%	9.4%	6.4%	–	4.1%	3.4%	4.6%	4.5%	2.7%	6.2%	–	1.3%	3%	–	–	1.4%	–	5.3%	1.3%	9.2%	2.2%
26 August- 4 September	CNC	1304	7.5%	10.7%	8.3%	8.6%	4.5%	–	5.4%	–	1.7%	3.0%	8.1%	4.3%	–	6.7%	–	1%	2.2%	–	22.3%	–	5.9%	22.3%	2.7%
31 July – 4 August	Guarumo/EcoAnalítica	2023	9.6%	3.1%	9.6%	7.1%	4.4%	–	3.6%	2.1%	2.6%	3%	2.6%	4.3%	1.3%	0.8%	3.0%	–	1.4%	1.4%	–	7.2%	2.5%	12.6%	2.2%
22 – 26 June	Guarumo/EcoAnalítica	1998	8.1%	6.2%	6.9%	8.8%	2.8%	–	5.5%	1.5%	2.3%	4.2%	2.7%	3.5%	2.0%	1.3%	3.3%	–	0.5%	0.7%	–	5.9%	4.1%	8.5%	2.2%
7 – 9 May	CNC	1030	–	13%	12%	9%	5%	–	8%	3%	5%	7%	2%	6%	2%	4%	–	1%	–	–	14%	5%	4%	14%	3.4%

A poll conducted by market research firm Guarumo and Ecoanalitica in February 2025 showed conservative candidate Vicky Dávila leading with 15.1%, followed by president Petro's ally Gustavo Bolívar at 11.9%. It also showed former presidential candidate and centrist Sergio Fajardo at 11.5%. Meanwhile, 7.1% polled said that they would not vote for any of the candidates.

Another poll conducted by the National Consulting Center in March 2025, commissioned and financed by Semana magazine, showed a close lead between Dávila with 13.6% and Fajardo with 13.4%, as well as Bolívar at 10.1%. The poll also showed Fajardo leading the voting intention with 35.1% against Dávila's 31.7% in a run-off.

=== Hypothetical polling ===
This section shows opinion polls for hypothetical second-round match-ups. Results include voting intentions, with undecided/non-voters not explicitly broken out in the poll.

==== Cepeda vs. Valencia ====
Pollster	Date(s) administered	Iván Cepeda	Paloma Valencia	Lead
Invamer	13–20 May 2026	52.8%	44.3%	8.5%
AtlasIntel/Semana	11 May-14 May 2026	39.2%	40%	0.8%
Fundación Génesis Crea	4–11 May 2026	45.6%	48.3%	2.7%
Invamer	15–24 April 2026	51.2%	46.6%	4.6%
GAD3	20–22 April 2026	44.0%	37.0%	7.0%
AtlasIntel	6–9 April 2026	39.6%	47.1%	7.5%
Guarumo/Ecoanalitica	19–25 Mar 2026	43.3%	40.0%	3.3%
CNC	17–21 Mar 2026	43.3%	42.9%	0.3%
GAD3	16–18 Mar 2026	43.0%	40.0%	3%
AtlasIntel/SEMANA	10–12 Mar 2026	38.4%	45.7%	7.3%
CNC	23–28 Feb 2026	57.0%	25.4%	31.6%
Guarumo/EcoAnalítica	19–25 Feb 2026	40.8%	26.4%	14.4%
AtlasIntel/SEMANA	19–25 February 2026	39.8%	29.6%	10 2%
GAD3	16–23 February 2026	40.0%	25.0%	15%
Invamer	11–22 February 2026	65.2%	30.7	34.5%
AtlasIntel/SEMANA	27 January–4 February 2026	35.2%	26.9%	8.3%
CNC	15–21 January 2026	47.7%	17.8%	12.6%
Guarumo/EcoAnalítica	14–22 January 2026	40.0%	21.2%	18.8%
GAD3	13–15 January 2026	43.0%	20.0%	23.0%
AtlasIntel/SEMANA	5–8 January 2026	35.8%	38.2%	2.4%

==== Cepeda vs. Fajardo ====
Pollster	Date(s) administered	Iván Cepeda	Sergio Fajardo	Lead
AtlasIntel	6–9 April 2026	38.3	37.4%	0.9%
Guarumo/EcoAnalítica	19–25 March 2026	44.8%	24.8%	20%
GAD3	16–18 March 2026	44.0%	32.0%	12%
AtlasIntel	10–12 March 2026	36.9%	36.7%	0.2
CNC	23–28 February 2026	52.1%	29.9%	22.2%
Guarumo/EcoAnalítica	19–25 February 2026	40.6%	25.7%	14.9%
AtlasIntel	19–25 February 2026	37.5%	25.1%	12.4%
GAD3	16–23 February 2026	36.0%	26.0%	10%
Invamer	11–22 February 2026	53.9%	42.8%	11.1%
AtlasIntel	27 January–4 February2026	33.7%	26.2%	2.5%
CNC	15–21 January 2026	40.7%	28.0%	5.7%
Guarumo/EcoAnalítica	14–22 January 2026	39.3%	24.8%	14.5%
GAD3	13–15 January 2026	40.0%	25.0%	15%
AtlasIntel	5–8 January 2026	32.1%	39.6%	7.5%
W.A.A	13–17 December 2025	42.1%	19.1%	23%
Invamer	15–27 November 2025	48.9%	46.4%	2.5%

== Results ==
Results from the first round indicated that National Salvation candidate Abelardo de la Espriella led in first place, a contrast to opinion polls which suggested a lead for the Historic Pact candidate Iván Cepeda. Espriella won 43.7% of the popular vote, while Cepeda followed with 40.9% of the vote. Democratic Centre candidate Paloma Valencia took third place with 6.9% of the popular vote, also underperforming opinion polls that suggested higher vote percentages for Valencia. Sergio Fajardo and other candidates received 6.7% of the vote, while blank votes represented 1.73% of the vote.

The second round saw a high turnout of 63.6%, with Espriella winning with a percentage of 49.66% over Cepeda's percentage of 48.7%, a gap of roughly 250,000 votes. Espriella's support in the second round primarily dominated in the diaspora and in the inner departments of Colombia, while Cepeda's support was concentrated in Bogotá and the outer departments. Espriella was confirmed as the winner of the election by the National Electoral Council on 24 June 2026.

Candidate	Running mate	Party	First round		Second round	
Candidate	Running mate	Party	Votes	%	Votes	%
Abelardo de la Espriella	José Manuel Restrepo	Defenders of the Homeland	10,366,143	43.78	12,960,166	49.66
Iván Cepeda	Aida Quilcué	Historic Pact	9,703,921	40.99	12,708,312	48.70
Paloma Valencia	Juan Daniel Oviedo	Democratic Centre	1,640,989	6.93		
Sergio Fajardo	Edna Bonilla	Dignity and Commitment	1,009,346	4.26		
Claudia López	Leonardo Huerta	Independent	224,137	0.95		
Santiago Botero Jaramillo	Carlos Cuevas	Independent	205,319	0.87		
Mauricio Lizcano	Pedro de la Torre	Independent	52,705	0.22		
Miguel Uribe Londoño	Luisa Fernanda Villegas	Colombian Democratic Party	28,167	0.12		
Sondra Macollins Garvin	Leonardo Karam Helo	Independent	19,387	0.08		
Roy Barreras	Martha Zamora	The Force	13,737	0.06		
Gustavo Matamoros Camacho	Mila Paz	Colombian Ecologist Party	4,901	0.02		
~~Luis Gilberto Murillo~~ (Note: The candidate withdrew before the vote; while having been initially awarded 13,270 votes in the preliminary count, the electoral council ruled that those votes were to be labeled "Unmarked" in the final count. Included among the invalid votes as for other Unmarked votes.)	~~Luz María Zapata~~	~~Independent~~	0	0.00		
~~Carlos Caicedo~~ (Note: The candidate withdrew before the vote; while having been initially awarded 12,694 votes in the preliminary count, the electoral council ruled that those votes were to be labeled "Unmarked" in the final count. Included among the invalid votes as for other Unmarked votes.)	~~Nelson Alacrón~~	~~Independent~~	0	0.00		
Blank votes			407,304	1.72	427,026	1.64
Total			23,676,056	100.00	26,095,504	100.00
Valid votes			23,676,056	98.69	26,095,504	99.05
Invalid votes			314,579	1.31	249,456	0.95
Total votes			23,990,635	100.00	26,344,960	100.00
Registered voters/turnout			41,421,973	57.92	41,421,973	63.60
Source: Registraduria (Round 1) Registraduria (Round 2)

=== By department ===
==== First round ====
Department	De La Espriella		Cepeda		Valencia		Fajardo		Others		Invalid or Blank votes	
Department	Votes	%	Votes	%	Votes	%	Votes	%	Votes	%	Votes	%
Amazonas	7,882	31.34%	13,963	55.52%	1,598	6.35%	477	1.90%	752	2.99%	879	3.44%
Antioquia	1,725,297	54.44%	806,959	25.46%	294,557	9.29%	225,181	7.10%	56,957	1.80%	101,441	3.16%
Arauca	50,728	51.41%	34,106	34.57%	5,906	5.99%	2,308	2.34%	3,045	3.09%	4,762	4.72%
Atlántico	433,031	40.99%	553,101	52.36%	20,950	1.98%	27,819	2.63%	9,102	0.86%	19,336	1.82%
Bogotá	1,543,282	37.74%	1,705,455	41.70%	372,210	9.10%	258,400	6.32%	139,807	3.42%	109,176	2.64%
Bolívar	312,612	38.13%	443,496	54.09%	23,912	2.92%	15,713	1.92%	10,860	1.32%	20,407	2.47%
Boyacá	337,263	50.54%	215,942	32.36%	57,533	8.62%	28,810	4.32%	17,482	2.62%	19,300	2.85%
Caldas	218,862	44.61%	146,218	29.80%	61,920	12.62%	26,666	5.44%	27,083	5.52%	22,023	4.38%
Caquetá	81,775	47.81%	66,480	38.86%	8,252	4.82%	4,044	2.36%	5,543	3.24%	8,826	5.05%
Casanare	134,484	61.38%	54,205	24.74%	14,697	6.71%	6,042	2.76%	5,756	2.63%	7,655	3.44%
Cauca	131,187	19.40%	463,068	68.46%	40,376	5.97%	12,007	1.78%	13,300	1.97%	36,967	5.30%
Cesar	224,043	46.38%	225,055	46.59%	11,949	2.47%	8,209	1.70%	6,729	1.39%	13,108	2.68%
Chocó	22,832	15.79%	109,841	75.97%	5,726	3.96%	1,199	0.83%	2,735	1.89%	5,638	3.81%
Consulates	320,813	54.42%	167,759	28.46%	54,693	9.28%	31,705	5.38%	9,941	1.69%	6,323	1.07%
Cundinamarca	724,462	45.31%	599,261	37.48%	123,186	7.70%	71,769	4.49%	50,248	3.14%	55,967	3.44%
Córdoba	268,819	37.98%	394,598	55.76%	19,464	2.75%	8,240	1.16%	6,979	0.99%	15,696	2.20%
Guainía	3,722	31.08%	6,778	56.60%	688	5.74%	188	1.57%	353	2.95%	396	3.27%
Guaviare	16,063	47.26%	12,680	37.31%	2,010	5.91%	825	2.43%	1,298	3.82%	2,047	5.86%
Huila	297,615	54.34%	176,630	32.25%	35,844	6.54%	14,647	2.67%	12,988	2.37%	17,644	3.18%
La Guajira	96,193	37.92%	140,831	55.52%	6,224	2.45%	2,951	1.16%	3,655	1.44%	7,422	2.88%
Magdalena	197,494	39.48%	262,892	52.55%	18,437	3.69%	7,911	1.58%	6,021	1.20%	15,025	2.96%
Meta	279,900	52.22%	174,077	32.48%	36,696	6.85%	17,768	3.32%	17,950	3.35%	20,093	3.68%
Nariño	148,258	21.43%	475,268	68.71%	31,406	4.54%	13,048	1.89%	10,824	1.56%	24,784	3.52%
Norte de Santander	519,225	70.66%	128,110	17.44%	33,341	4.54%	28,803	3.92%	16,591	2.26%	15,758	2.12%
Putumayo	25,089	18.98%	94,395	71.41%	4,427	3.35%	2,127	1.61%	3,201	2.42%	5,253	3.91%
Quindío	142,807	48.65%	94,318	32.13%	27,586	9.40%	15,713	5.35%	7,507	2.56%	11,283	3.77%
Risaralda	226,321	44.79%	182,255	36.07%	44,566	8.82%	26,520	5.25%	15,149	3.00%	20,828	4.04%
San Andrés and Providencia	7,793	43.36%	7,936	44.16%	832	4.63%	535	2.98%	207	1.15%	815	4.50%
Santander	684,621	57.12%	344,546	28.75%	76,733	6.40%	47,302	3.95%	27,427	2.29%	30,454	2.51%
Sucre	145,827	36.42%	226,884	56.66%	14,319	3.58%	4,331	1.08%	4,057	1.01%	9,110	2.25%
Tolima	315,364	46.95%	235,760	35.10%	70,984	10.57%	20,325	3.03%	17,452	2.60%	23,536	3.44%
Valle del Cauca	711,766	33.76%	1,124,311	53.32%	118,664	5.63%	77,322	3.67%	36,556	1.73%	69,062	3.23%
Vaupés	1,379	15.04%	6,932	75.59%	344	3.75%	148	1.61%	227	2.48%	223	2.41%
Vichada	9,334	43.82%	9,811	46.06%	959	4.50%	293	1.38%	571	2.68%	646	2.99%
Total	10,366,143	43.78%	9,703,921	40.99%	1,640,989	6.93%	1,009,346	4.26%	548,353	2.32%	721,883	3.01%
Source: Registraduría Nacional del Estado Civil, official scrutiny: Observatorio electoral

==== Second round ====
Department	De La Espriella		Cepeda		Blank votes		Valid votes		Invalid votes	
Department	Votes	%	Votes	%	Votes	%	Votes	%	Votes	%
Amazonas	10,585	36.71%	17,848	61.90%	402	1.39%	28,835	99.08%	268	0.92%
Antioquia	2,186,826	64.45%	1,132,893	33.39%	73,558	2.17%	3,393,277	98.95%	35,953	1.05%
Arauca	63,518	56.63%	46,360	41.33%	2,283	2.04%	112,161	98.39%	1,831	1.61%
Atlántico	504,795	40.40%	732,654	58.63%	12,121	0.97%	1,249,570	99.58%	5,322	0.42%
Bogotá	1,933,644	45.39%	2,234,979	52.46%	91,586	2.15%	4,260,209	99.23%	32,939	0.77%
Bolívar	391,799	39.38%	591,807	59.49%	11,194	1.13%	994,800	99.52%	4,844	0.48%
Boyacá	441,725	60.24%	280,073	38.20%	11,470	1.56%	733,268	98.94%	7,871	1.06%
Caldas	306,826	58.79%	203,558	39.01%	11,474	2.20%	521,858	98.12%	9,998	1.88%
Caquetá	101,584	48.64%	102,270	48.97%	4,983	2.39%	208,837	98.34%	3,525	1.66%
Casanare	161,306	69.11%	68,476	29.34%	3,626	1.55%	233,408	98.74%	2,972	1.26%
Cauca	176,903	22.85%	585,780	75.66%	11,594	1.50%	774,277	98.19%	14,281	1.81%
Cesar	265,370	47.95%	281,785	50.91%	6,318	1.14%	553,473	99.14%	4,785	0.86%
Chocó	33,386	17.77%	152,872	81.39%	1,580	0.84%	187,838	98.67%	2,532	1.33%
Consulates	390,974	63.77%	213,131	34.77%	8,954	1.46%	613,059	99.83%	1,051	0.17%
Cundinamarca	896,687	52.91%	768,212	45.33%	29,873	1.76%	1,694,772	98.82%	20,238	1.18%
Córdoba	348,895	40.76%	498,935	58.29%	8,138	0.95%	855,968	99.38%	5,310	0.62%
Guainía	5,145	34.84%	9,447	63.98%	174	1.18%	14,766	99.23%	114	0.77%
Guaviare	20,578	52.78%	17,424	44.69%	984	2.52%	38,986	97.86%	854	2.14%
Huila	375,068	61.13%	229,022	37.33%	9,477	1.54%	613,567	98.93%	6,657	1.07%
La Guajira	126,520	38.52%	198,553	60.45%	3,398	1.03%	328,471	98.89%	3,691	1.11%
Magdalena	255,135	41.90%	347,253	57.02%	6,579	1.08%	608,967	99.36%	3,927	0.64%
Meta	339,750	59.13%	225,796	39.30%	9,031	1.57%	574,577	98.56%	8,376	1.44%
Nariño	188,019	22.12%	652,971	76.82%	9,066	1.07%	850,056	98.95%	8,991	1.05%
Norte de Santander	602,974	76.57%	174,242	22.13%	10,307	1.31%	787,523	99.25%	5,931	0.75%
Putumayo	33,899	20.17%	131,958	78.52%	2,196	1.31%	168,053	98.89%	1,884	1.11%
Quindío	179,397	58.28%	122,194	39.70%	6,214	2.02%	307,805	98.51%	4,652	1.49%
Risaralda	288,651	53.74%	237,505	44.22%	10,953	2.04%	537,109	98.58%	7,751	1.42%
San Andrés and Providencia	10,024	43.81%	12,311	53.80%	547	2.39%	22,882	99.53%	109	0.47%
Santander	822,859	64.61%	431,354	33.87%	19,385	1.52%	1,273,598	99.18%	10,551	0.82%
Sucre	188,389	39.91%	279,405	59.20%	4,195	0.89%	471,989	99.39%	2,898	0.61%
Tolima	425,300	57.83%	299,530	40.73%	10,627	1.44%	735,457	98.80%	8,942	1.20%
Valle del Cauca	869,833	37.68%	1,403,962	60.83%	34,385	1.49%	2,308,180	99.14%	20,101	0.86%
Vaupés	2,116	18.10%	9,480	81.10%	93	0.80%	11,689	99.37%	74	0.63%
Vichada	11,686	44.57%	14,272	54.43%	261	1.00%	26,219	99.12%	233	0.88%
Total	12,960,166	49.66%	12,708,312	48.70%	427,026	1.64%	26,095,504	99.05%	249,456	0.95%
Source: Registraduría Nacional

=== Consulates/Abroad vote ===
Country	First round	Second round	
Country	Algeria	Fajardo	Cepeda
Argentina	Cepeda	Cepeda	
Aruba	De La Espriella	De La Espriella	
Australia	Cepeda	Cepeda	
Austria	Cepeda	Cepeda	
Azerbaijan	Cepeda	Cepeda	
Belgium	Cepeda	Cepeda	
Bolivia	De La Espriella	De La Espriella	
Brazil	Cepeda	Cepeda	
Canada	De La Espriella	De La Espriella	
Chile	De La Espriella	De La Espriella	
China	De La Espriella	De La Espriella	
Costa Rica	De La Espriella	De La Espriella	
Cuba	Cepeda	De La Espriella	
Curacao	De La Espriella	De La Espriella	
Denmark	Cepeda	Cepeda	
Dominican Republic	De La Espriella	De La Espriella	
Ecuador	De La Espriella	De La Espriella	
Egypt	De La Espriella	De La Espriella	
El Salvador	De La Espriella	De La Espriella	
Finland	Cepeda	Cepeda	
France	Cepeda	Cepeda	
Germany	Cepeda	Cepeda	
Ghana	Cepeda	Cepeda	
Guatemala	De La Espriella	De La Espriella	
Haiti	Cepeda	Cepeda	
Honduras	De La Espriella	De La Espriella	
Hungary	Cepeda	Cepeda	
India	De La Espriella	Cepeda	
Indonesia	Valencia	De La Espriella	
Ireland	Cepeda	Cepeda	
Israel	De La Espriella	De La Espriella	
Italy	Cepeda	Cepeda	
Jamaica	De La Espriella	De La Espriella	
Japan	De La Espriella	De La Espriella	
Kenya	Cepeda	Cepeda	
Lebanon	De La Espriella	De La Espriella	
Malaysia	De La Espriella	Cepeda	
Mexico	De La Espriella	De La Espriella	
Morocco	De La Espriella	Cepeda	
Netherlands	Cepeda	Cepeda	
New Zealand	Cepeda	Cepeda	
Nicaragua	De La Espriella	De La Espriella	
Norway	Cepeda	Cepeda	
Panama	De La Espriella	De La Espriella	
Paraguay	De La Espriella	De La Espriella	
Peru	De La Espriella	De La Espriella	
Philippines	De La Espriella	De La Espriella	
Poland	Cepeda	Cepeda	
Portugal	Cepeda	Cepeda	
Puerto Rico	De La Espriella	De La Espriella	
Russia	Cepeda	Cepeda	
Singapore	De La Espriella	De La Espriella	
South Africa	De La Espriella	De La Espriella	
South Korea	De La Espriella	De La Espriella	
Spain	Cepeda	Cepeda	
Sweden	Cepeda	Cepeda	
Switzerland	Cepeda	Cepeda	
Thailand	De La Espriella	De La Espriella	
Trinidad and Tobago	De La Espriella	De La Espriella	
Turkey	Cepeda	Cepeda	
United Arab Emirates	De La Espriella	De La Espriella	
United Kingdom	De La Espriella	De La Espriella	
United States	De La Espriella	De La Espriella	
Uruguay	De La Espriella	De La Espriella	
Venezuela	De La Espriella	De La Espriella	
Vietnam	Cepeda	Cepeda	
Source: Registraduria

== Aftermath and reactions ==
=== First round ===
Flávio Bolsonaro, a Brazilian senator and a son of Jair Bolsonaro, held a call with Espriella to endorse him. The day after the first-round election results were completed, U.S. President Donald Trump issued a long statement on Truth Social congratulating and endorsing Espriella, saying that "Espriella is a man who will fight, work, and care for his country, just like me." On 29 May 2026, Ecuadorean president Daniel Noboa met with Abelardo de la Espriella, and said he was committed to "jointly fight narcoterrorism", and would eliminate a security tax on 1 June. In response, the Colombian government led by Petro called the measure "deliberate interference" in the election.

=== Second round ===
External videos
- Cepeda addresses the Nation after the full second round results were released

Preliminary results showed de la Espriella winning the election by less than 1 percent. Petro did not accept those results, while Cepeda recognized them but emphasized their non-binding character, with both saying they would wait for the results of the thorough counting of votes (escrutinio). Al Jazeera ascribed Petro's distrust in preliminary results to the 2022 parliamentary election, in which then-coalition of parties Historic Pact recovered about 500 thousand votes in the result of the escrutinio compared to preliminary results. Al Jazeera also noted that the National Civil Registry recorded high accuracy in the preliminary results of the 2026 parliamentary election and in the first round of the 2026 presidential election. Authorities finished the recount which reaffirmed the results before declaring de la Espriella’s victory on 25 June 2026. Cepeda thereafter conceded the elections reaffirming he would be constructive opposition to de la Espriella, saying "I have decided to accept the result of this process, which indicates that Abelardo de la Espriella is the new president of the Republic."

Right-wing Medellín mayor and third place candidate in the 2022 presidential election, Federico Gutiérrez congratulated Espriella and his running mate saying that "as the mayor of Medellin, I am ready to work with Espriella and his running mate into bringing Colombia forward." Democratic Centre politician and Petro's Presidential predecessor Iván Duque congratulated Espriella and his running mate wishing them success for their administration while also thanking the National Registry for 'free and fair and transparent elections'. Democratic Center leader and former president Álvaro Uribe described Espriella and his running mate as "doctors", and also expressed confidence that Espriella will establish a government of "democratic recovery" that "will benefit all Colombians", while also describing Cepeda's campaign as "illegal, with the support of Gustavo Petro". Uribe also issued claims of vote buying, and "the imposition of narcoterrorist groups that forced many communities to vote for Cepeda". Uribe also stated that "we cannot allow any more dirty tricks from the Petroist-Chavistas".

de la Espriella was congratulated by U.S. President Donald Trump and Secretary of State Marco Rubio, as well as by Latin American presidents such as Argentina's Javier Milei, Ecuador's Daniel Noboa, Chile's José Antonio Kast, Bolivia's Rodrigo Paz, the Dominican Republic's Luis Abinader, Paraguay's Santiago Peña, and Israeli foreign minister Gideon Sa'ar. Nate Morris, President Trump's nominee to be ambassador to Colombia, commented that he looked forward to working with de la Espriella to advance Trump’s agenda in Colombia. The EU congratulated De la Espriella on his victory in Colombia, highlighted the peaceful elections with record participation, and offered to strengthen bilateral cooperation.

==== Allegations of voter fraud ====
Petro claimed that the IP addresses of several servers used in the election had been changed, and that this was proof that the result had been compromised, with him also claiming that "the only entity in the world with the capability to do that is the State of Israel". In a separate post, Petro claimed that software meant to prevent fraud had been provided by the U.S. and Israel. Petro then demanded a vote recount and an investigation into the supposed vulnerabilities. His allegations were dismissed by Attorney General Gregorio Eljach, saying that "there is no evidence of fraud". After Cepeda conceded, Petro acknowledged the results, announcing that his administration would begin the formal transition process.

At Corferias, a convention center in Bogotá and Colombia's most important voting center, a person reported another person had been allowed to vote with a private credential rather than a national ID card, which is the only document valid for voting. Petro reported lawyers called for the thorough counting of votes were not allowed to enter Corferias.

Revista Raya reported that an internal document of the Ministry of Labor showed that it had received complaints from the workers of 59 companies alleging that they were being constrained by company owners to vote for de la Espriella by proselytizing him and claiming that if Cepeda won, the companies would be expropriated and that employees would lose their jobs. Raya pointed out some of the companies listed were in the medical sector and had previously had allegations made against them for fraud.

In areas of the country where paramilitary and guerrilla organizations are present, concerns were raised before the elections by the Ombudsman's Office for possible constraining of the electoral process. Right-wing senator María Fernanda Cabal claimed that guerrilla-led constraining occurred in several parts of the country in favor of Cepeda. Responses to Cabal's claims point out that the presence of armed groups in these areas do not necessarily imply constraints to the electoral process, and that many of the areas claimed to be affected by violent constraints have historically voted for progressive and left-wing candidates in the past. Claims similar to Cabal's were also made by De la Espriella's campaign. The Election Observation Mission of the European Union, in a report about its monitoring the elections, did not find meddling from armed groups that could have affected the results of the elections.
