= 2026 Democratic Centre presidential primaries =

Selection of the Democratic Centre Party nominee

2026 Democratic Centre Party presidential primaries
- December 15, 2025
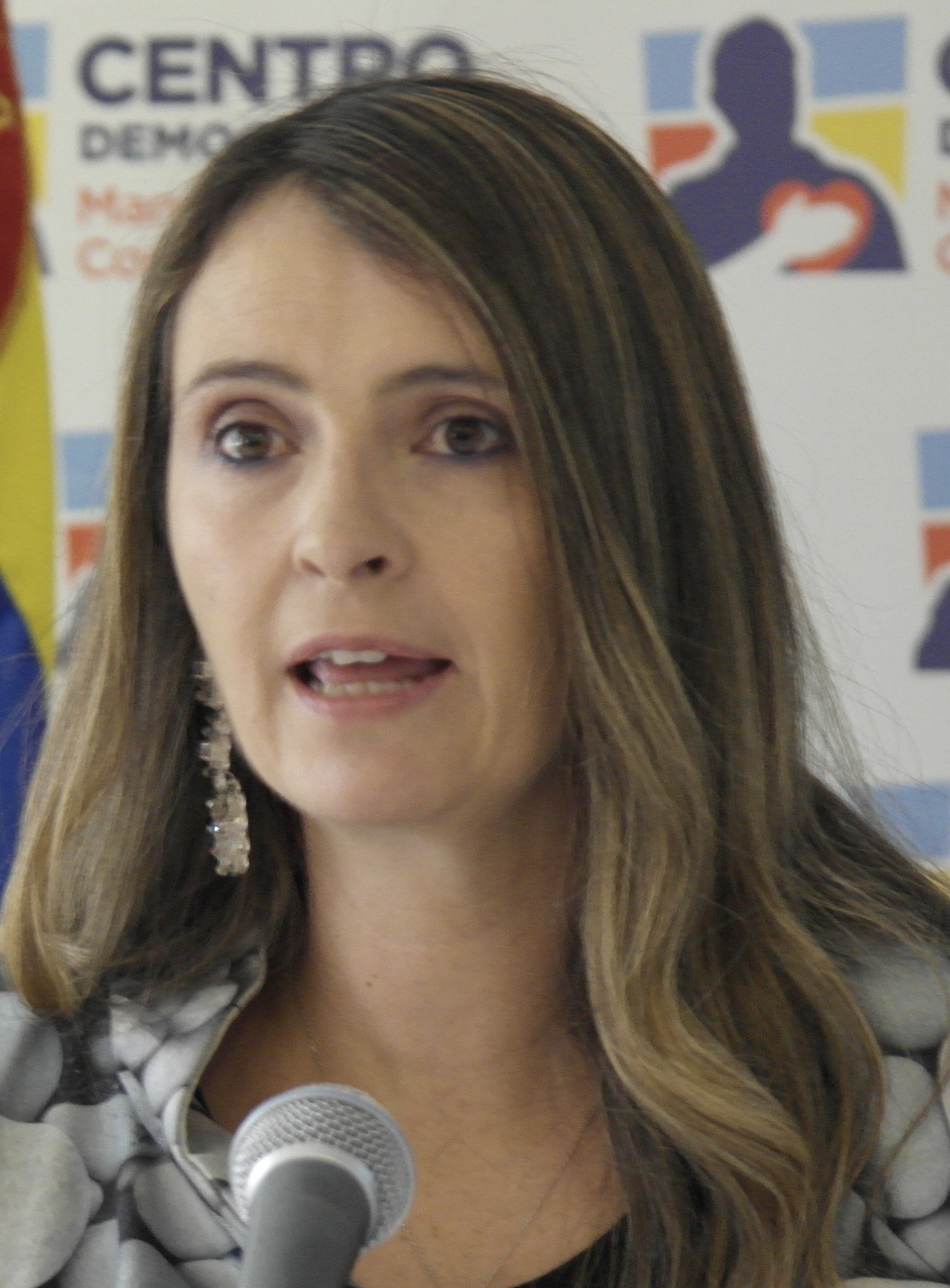

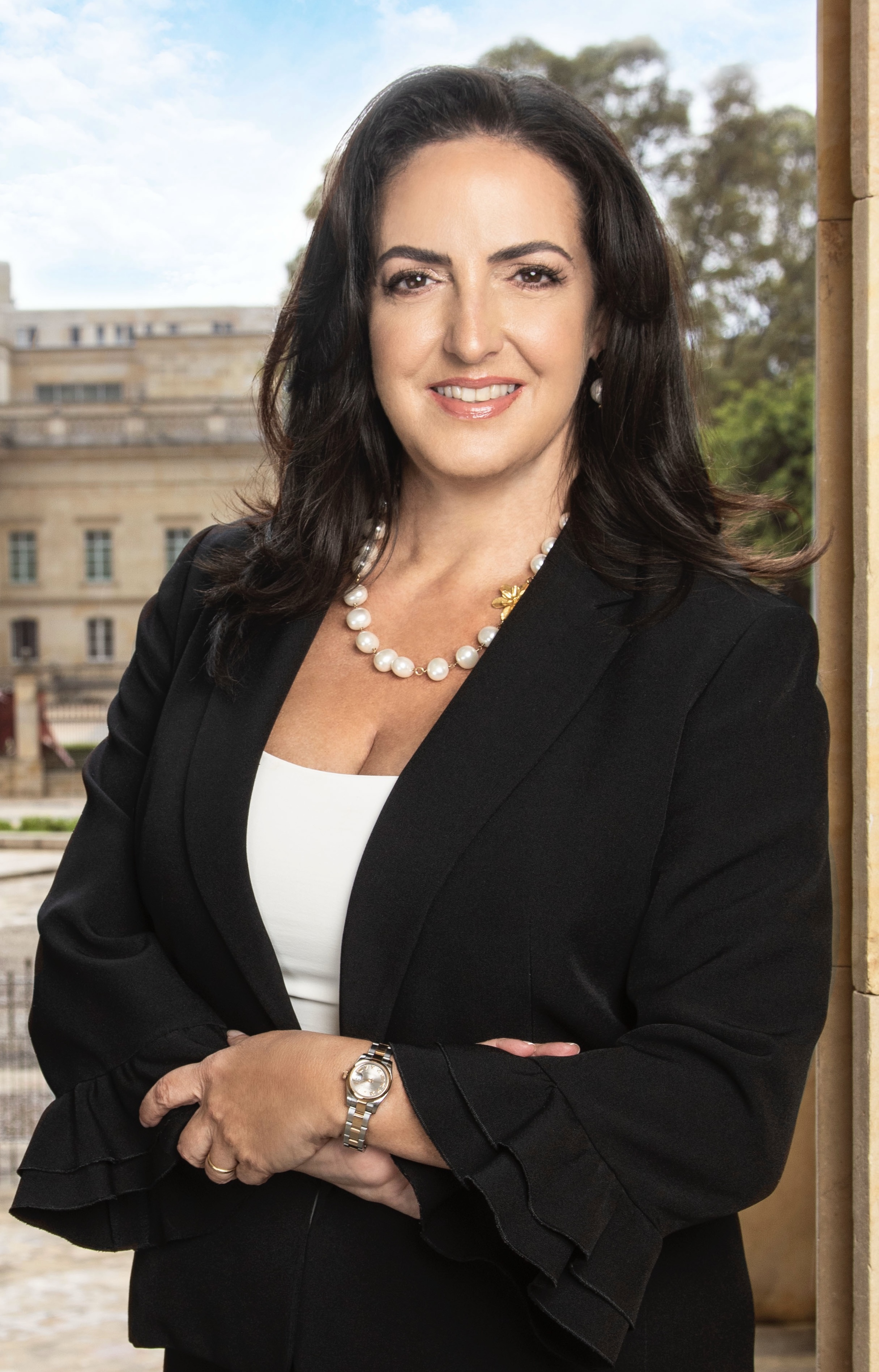

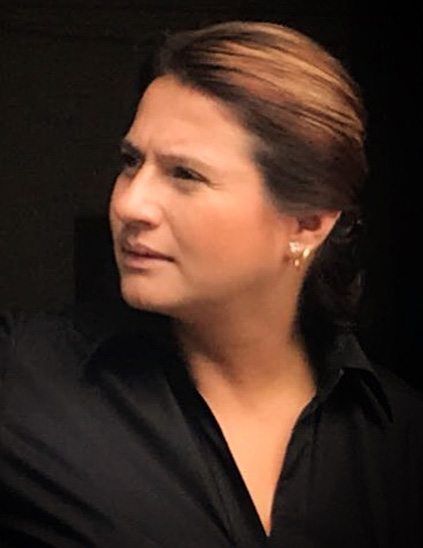
Candidate	Paloma Valencia	María Fernanda Cabal	Paola Holguín
Home state	Cauca	Cauca Valley	Antioquia
Delegate count	1,003	871	367
Percentage	46%	37.7%	16.3%
Democratic Centre nominee
Paloma Valencia

On December 15, 2025, the Democratic Centre party announced Paloma Valencia as the winner after she obtained the majority of votes in the electoral college. The selection process involved a survey conducted through a first and second poll that defined the chances of the three candidates. Delegates from the Democratic Centre, including senators, representatives, departmental deputies, and members, were responsible for selecting the presidential candidate.

Valencia will test her strength in the 2026 Colombian presidential primaries, along with other candidates from various political factions, where her running mate will be chosen.

== Candidate and Results ==
The main candidates in the Democratic Centre's 2026 presidential primaries either held important elected positions or received substantial media coverage.

Candidate	Born	Most recent position	Department	Campaign announced	Results	Ref.
Paloma Valencia	January 19, 1978 (age 47); Popayán, Cauca	Senator (2014–present)	Cauca	August 25, 2025	46% 1 003 votes	
María Fernanda Cabal	August 8, 1966 (age 59); Cali, Cauca Valley	Senator (2014–present)	Valle del Cauca	August 30, 2025	37.7% 871 votes	
Paola Holguín	November 11, 1973 (age 52); Medellín, Antioquia	Senator (2014–present)	Antioquia	January 31, 2024	16.3% 367 votes	

== Controversies ==
Following the death of Miguel Uribe Turbay, his father, Miguel Uribe Londoño, assumed leadership of his presidential campaign, initially receiving the support of the Democratic Center party. On December 1, the party officially announced its three candidates, omitting Uribe Londoño's name from the primary election list. He responded days later with a statement declaring that he had not been notified of the decision and that he was resigning from the party, acknowledging that it no longer upheld its founding values.

On January 26, a month after Paloma Valencia was chosen as the party's candidate, María Fernanda Cabal, along with her husband José Félix Lafaurie, announced their irrevocable resignation from the party, citing irregularities in the primary election as the main reason. Cabal announced her support for Valencia in the 2026 presidential election, running as an independent.

== See also ==
- 2026 Colombian presidential election
