= Omar Bula =

Colombian politician (born 1967)

Minister of Foreign Affairs
- Incumbent
- Assumed office 7 August 2026
- President: Abelardo de la Espriella
- Preceded by: Yolanda Villavicencio

Personal details
- Born: Omar Bula Escobar; 1 January 1963 (age 63) Sahagún, Córdoba, Colombia
- Party: Defenders of the Homeland (since 2026)
- Other political affiliations: Liberal (2010–2020)
- Education: UCLouvain (BS)

Omar Bula Escobar (born 1 January 1963) is a Colombian economist, educator, politician and diplomat who serves as Minister of Foreign Affairs since 2026. As an activist, Bula has supported and spread conspiracy theories about the 2020 US elections, global warming, and the Great Replacement.

Born in Sahagún, Córdoba, Bula holds a degree in Business Administration from the European Business School. In 2017, he began working as a professor in the MBA program at Sergio Arboleda University.

== Early life and career ==
Omar Bula Escobar was born in Sahagún, Córdoba, on 1 January 1963, to Germán Bula (1922-2020) and Olga Escobar. His father was governor of Córdoba. Bula studied Business Administration at the EU Business School. He later served full-time as a professor in the MBA program at the University of the Andes in Bogotá, D.C.

Bula has extensive experience in the diplomatic sector. A veteran representative to the United Nations, he has served as Colombia's representative to the World Food Programme. He has been a resident representative in Addis Ababa, Ethiopia; Dakar, Senegal; Panama City, Panama; and Rome, Italy. He has also served as program director and regional coordinator in Baghdad, Iraq, and Cairo, Egypt.

Bula previously served as a full-time professor at the Sergio Arboleda University. During his time there, he met Abelardo de la Espriella, with whom he formed a friendship. Both of their families are originally from Sahagún.

In 2026, he was nominated as Minister of Foreign Affairs by President-elect de la Espriella, becoming the first person from Córdoba to hold this cabinet position.

Political offices
Preceded by Yolanda Villavicencio	Minister of Foreign Affairs; 2026-present	Incumbent
Order of precedence
Preceded by Francia Márquez as Former Vice President	Order of precedence of Colombia as Minister of Foreign Affairs since August 7, 2026	Succeeded by Ambassadors if there is a diplomat or foreign personalities
Preceded by Rodrigo Lara Restrepo as Minister of the Interior	Order of precedence of Colombia as Minister of Foreign Affairs since August 7, 2026	Succeeded by Miguel Gómez Martínez as Minister of Finance and Public Credit
