= Jonathan Hernandez =

Jonathan Hernandez, Jonathan Hernández, or Jon Hernandez may refer to:

- Jonathan "JB" Hernandez (fl. 2000s–2020s), Filipino horse racing jockey
- Jon Hernandez (1969–1993), Filipino actor
- Jonathan Hernandez (soccer) (born 1997), American soccer player
- Jonathan Hernández (baseball) (born 1996), Dominican–American baseball player
- Jonathan Hernandez (baseball coach) (born 1985), American baseball coach
- Jota Pe Hernández (Jonathan Ferney Pulido Hernández; born 1992), Colombian politician and Internet personality
