= Abelardo de la Espriella =

President of Colombia since 2026

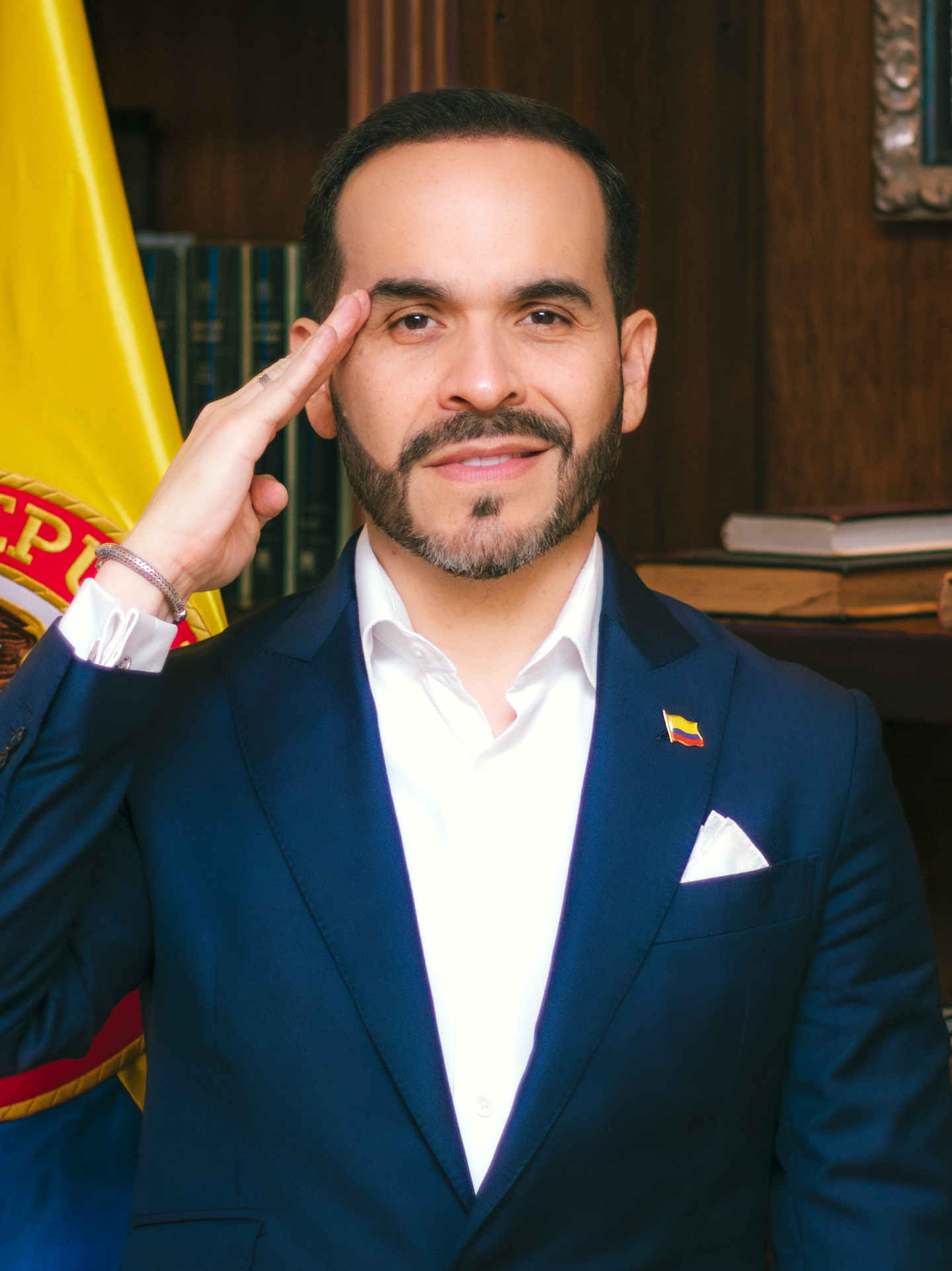
- De la Espriella in 2026

36th President of Colombia
- Incumbent
- Assumed office 7 August 2026
- Vice President: José Manuel Restrepo
- Preceded by: Gustavo Petro

Leader of Defenders of the Homeland
- Incumbent
- Assumed office 5 August 2024
- President: Mauricio Gómez Amín
- Preceded by: Party established

Personal details
- Born: Abelardo Gabriel de la Espriella Otero; 31 July 1978 (age 48) Bogotá, Colombia
- Citizenship: Colombia; United States; Italy
- Party: Defenders of the Homeland (since 2024)
- Spouse(s): Yoly Illidge (m. 2001; div. 2004) Ana Lucía Pineda (m. 2008)
- Children: 4
- Education: Universidad Sergio Arboleda (Lic.)
- Nickname: El Tigre (The Tiger)

Abelardo Gabriel de la Espriella Otero (Note: Latin American Spanish: [aβeˈlaɾðo ɣaˈβɾjel ðe la esˈpɾjeʝa oˈteɾo]) (born 31 July 1978) is a Colombian lawyer and businessman serving as the 36th president of Colombia since 2026. He is the founder and leader of the far-right Defenders of the Homeland party, established initially as a movement in 2024.

Born in Bogotá and raised in Montería, Córdoba, de la Espriella studied law at Sergio Arboleda University, received his degree from Del Rosario University, and obtained a master's degree in law from Nebrija University in 2012. He became a prominent public figure through his defense of high-profile clients, including politicians accused of ties to right-wing paramilitary groups and Alex Saab, a Venezuelan businessman later indicted in the United States on money laundering charges. In 2005, he founded the Foundation for Peace Initiatives (FIPAZ), which promoted a referendum to prohibit extradition in Colombia and organized forums featuring commanders of the United Self-Defense Forces of Colombia (AUC).

In the 2026 Colombian presidential election, de la Espriella received 43.74% of the vote in the first round on 31 May, before defeating left-wing senator Iván Cepeda in the runoff on 21 June with 49.66% to Cepeda's 48.70%—the smallest margin of victory ever recorded in a Colombian presidential election. With 12.9 million votes, he became the presidential candidate with the most votes in the country's history.

De la Espriella supports the right to bear arms, withdrawal from international bodies such as the United Nations and the Inter-American Court of Human Rights, laissez-faire economic policies, and an end to peace processes with Colombian armed groups. In foreign policy, he has overseen closer alignment with the United States under President Donald Trump and the restoration of diplomatic ties with Israel.

== Early life, family and career ==
His father, a lawyer by profession, served as a magistrate at the Administrative Tribunal of Córdoba. His mother, María Eugenia Otero Aldana, comes from a family of cattle ranchers with ties to local politics.

During his early years, de la Espriella associated with Salvatore Mancuso. Mancuso is ten years older, and they studied at the same high school and moved within the same social circles—the city's upper class. He also performed in his high school's theater group and later worked for a popular local radio station, La Voz de Montería. He has retained a passion for hunting and firearms.

In a 2014 TV show, de la Espriella stated that as a child he enjoyed tying firecrackers to cats and watching them explode, stating that doing this to cats was "awful" but that he "enjoyed it". In 2025, during his presidential campaign, he stated that the anecdote regarding cats and firecrackers was not real, and was a "joke". In the same statement, he said he regretted that "joke" and described himself as "an animal lover".

He was a candidate for governor of Córdoba during the 1997 Colombian regional and municipal elections. He is also a close friend of Álvaro Uribe, who was president of Colombia from 2002 to 2010.

After graduating, he moved to Bogotá, D.C., to study law at Sergio Arboleda University, an institution with a conservative orientation. He received his degree from Del Rosario University. In 2012 he obtained a master's degree in law from Nebrija University.

De la Espriella worked at the Initiatives for Peace Foundation (FIPAZ), an organization that sought to promote a referendum to recognize the political rights of all armed actors during the Colombian conflict and to amend the Constitution to prohibit the extradition of Colombians, serving as an advisor to the United Self-Defense Forces of Colombia. De la Espriella is a millionaire. Before his presidential run, he traveled using private planes and promoted his rum and wine businesses. After living in Miami for over a decade, he received United States citizenship in 2023.

== High-profile legal representations ==
De la Espriella defended political figures accused of having allied themselves with paramilitaries, some of whom had been close to him since childhood, such as the former congresswoman Eleonora Pineda—who was a friend of his mother—as well as Dieb Maloof and Rocío Arias. In 2008, de la Espriella publicly supported Salvatore Mancuso, a former drug trafficker and former United Self-Defense Forces of Colombia commander. De la Espriella publicly stated: "He took on a struggle that all of us from Córdoba should have fought. If I were in his place, I would have done the same." In 2012, de la Espriella represented Dania Londoño Suárez, a Colombian woman linked to the prostitution scandal in Cartagena during the Summit of the Americas and involving members of the United States Secret Service. According to an Associated Press report, he confirmed that his client had reached a pre-agreement with Playboy magazine and negotiated an interview with the American television network ABC. He stated that as a result of those agreements, she would not grant interviews to other news outlets, and declined to disclose the financial terms involved.

From 2013 to 2019, de la Espriella served as legal counsel to Alex Saab, who was later indicted in the United States on charges including money laundering and alleged operation as a financial agent for the Venezuelan government of Nicolás Maduro. Saab publicly described de la Espriella as a close associate and legal advisor. In May 2014, Venezuelan political strategist Juan José Rendón was reported to be scheduled to give a statement at the Colombian Consulate in Miami in connection with an investigation. According to La Prensa, he was to be accompanied by attorney Abelardo de la Espriella. In 2015, de la Espriella served as the attorney for Pastor Álvaro Gámez of Pasto following sexual abuse trials. Seven women filed public complaints questioning de la Espriella's involvement in defending sexual predators, alleging that he had discredited their testimonies and evidence in court.

In 2018, de la Espriella served as attorney for former President Andrés Pastrana Arango after a congressman from the Alternative Democratic Pole accused the former President of having ties with the pedophile ring run by Jeffrey Epstein and Ghislaine Maxwell. De la Espriella stated that "he must post a video on social media setting forth the terms of the settlement and retracting the defamatory and slanderous statements against President Pastrana. Justice has been served." In late 2023, de la Espriella suggested nominating Pastrana as his head of the Ministry of Foreign Affairs in his potential cabinet during the start of his presidential campaign. Following the release of part of the Epstein Files in early 2026, it was discovered that Pastrana had appeared more than 50 times on DOJ documents, in addition several photographs showing Pastrana and Maxwell on plane rides were disclosed to the public.

In 2019, de la Espriella publicly defended the actions of ESMAD officers involving an incident of police brutality against college students following the 2019 protests that resulted in the death of Dilan Cruz in Bogotá. He also stated that he would provide his legal services to ESMAD officers free of charge, citing his support for the police. In 2026, the Inter American Press Association and the Colombian Foundation for Press Freedom raised concerns about potential judicial harassment by de la Espriella when, in response to a column discussing his ties to Saab, he announced possible legal actions against the author. Between 2008 and 2019, he was reportedly the complainant in 109 defamation and slander cases, many of which were dismissed. The Foundation for Press Freedom has described these cases as examples of judicial harassment.

In April 2026, Raya Magazine’s Investigative Unit revealed de la Espriella’s connections to Daniel Peñarredonda, an attorney associated with his firm who had been implicated in a fraud case involving drug traffickers that had been brought to trial in the state of Florida, where his firm attempted to carry out mass evictions as well as the forced displacement of an entire town in southern Bolívar for the exploitation of the Walter Gold Mine. The Black Communities Process (PCN), an organization that advocates for the rights of Black people in Colombia, issued a statement condemning the actions of the de la Espriella law firm, noting that his actions incited paramilitary violence against Black communities in southern Bolívar with the aim of eliminating any social opposition to the exploitation of the gold mine by private entities.

== FIPAZ Foundation and ties to the AUC ==
In 2005, de la Espriella founded the Foundation for Peace Initiatives (FIPAZ). This foundation organized university forums in which Iván Roberto Duque, alias "Ernesto Báez," former commander of the Central Bolívar Bloc of the United Self-Defense Forces of Colombia (AUC), took part, and at which Salvatore Mancuso was present and photographed alongside de la Espriella. FIPAZ also promoted a referendum to prohibit extradition in Colombia.

In 2008, Báez stated that "the armed organization sought out students, through Abelardo de la Espriella, as a dissemination channel to justify the war undertaken by the paramilitary organization." In a 2011 ruling against former congressman Juan Pablo Sánchez, the Supreme Court of Justice held that FIPAZ "did not promote peace when the self-defense groups were massacring, disappearing, killing, and torturing, but rather when they sought to project themselves politically through university students," and ordered to launch an investigation into de la Espriella. However, the Office of the Attorney General, under the leadership of Mario Iguarán, who, according to Mancuso, was a close friend of de la Espriella, had already closed the investigation against him for criminal conspiracy and money laundering in 2009.

== 2026 presidential election ==
In the run-up to the May–June 2026 presidential election, the political website La Silla Vacía noted that "everything in his campaign revolves around the idea of the 'alpha male' as an unquestionable sign of his ability to govern", in order to set himself apart from the conservative candidate, Paloma Valencia.

His rallies have featured figures from across the political right in Latin America, including military veteran leaders and evangelical preachers. Ecuadorian president Daniel Noboa endorsed his presidential campaign, saying that if de la Espriella were elected, the Ecuadorian government would eliminate tariffs on Colombian products. In addition, de la Espriella also received public endorsements from Chilean president José Antonio Kast and Argentine president Javier Milei following his victory in the first round. In mid-June 2026, the Colombian Ministry of Foreign Affairs rejected statements made by Milei in support of de la Espriella's candidacy, citing them as political interference and a violation of the Charter of the Organization of American States. Peruvian presidential candidate Keiko Fujimori of Popular Force also congratulated de la Espriella on his election victory, noting that she was grateful for the support de la Espriella had provided earlier in her campaign to win the 2026 Peruvian elections. Fujimori also highlighted the improvement in diplomatic relations between Colombia and Peru under her potential administration.

U.S. President Donald Trump endorsed de la Espriella, accusing his opponent Iván Cepeda of being a "radical left-wing Marxist" in a series of Truth Social posts and noting that de la Espriella could improve relations between Colombia and the United States, which were subject to several diplomatic confrontations between Trump and outgoing president Gustavo Petro. Nate Morris, President Trump's nominee to be Ambassador to Colombia, commented that he looked forward to working with de la Espriella to advance Trump’s agenda in Colombia.

According to The Economist's editor-in-chief Zanny Minton Beddoes, along with a panel of journalists, voters are fed up with systemic crime, leading them to seek candidates they believe can solve it, which explains how the country can go from both ends of the political spectrum. Into the early 2020s, there was a "pink tide", but that by the mid-2020s there was a "conservative wave" and citizens demand crackdowns on violent crime. The panel of journalists concluded that the incoming president was the "Trumpiest of the lot".

Espriella has been a vocal advocate against foreign left-wing influence in the country. In January 2026, de la Espriella leveled several accusations against the independent media outlet La Silla Vacía, claiming that it was directly funded by George Soros and the Open Society Foundation following the publication of several articles that revealed certain irregularities in his companies. Both the editorial team at La Silla Vacía and several fact-checking and journalist protection organizations refuted de la Espriella’s accusations as false, which could pose a threat to freedom of press. The investigation by La Silla Vacía had revealed that several of the companies linked to de la Espriella had ties to individuals who had supported armed groups, including Hugues Rodríguez, who had directly financed the United Self-Defense Forces of Colombia in Cesar, which had committed several massacres of civilians. Additionally, the news outlet clarified that de la Espriella had had connections with and received financial assistance from Juan Carlos Gossaín, the former governor of Bolívar, who had previously been removed from office for corruption-related crimes after embezzling the departmental public budget that was intended for health programs for the poor in Bolívar.

Espriella faced criticism during the election cycle for his past conduct. On 14 May 2026, de la Espriella showed explicit photos of his genitals to a female journalist as part of an interview with Piso 8 FM. The incident sparked outrage among women's rights groups and led to a court order requiring de la Espriella to publicly apologize to the journalist. In addition, the family of Rosa Elvira Cely publicly denounced mistreatment and defamation by de la Espriella's campaign, stating that the presidential candidate had lied about his role in the Rosa Elvira Cely Law to prevent femicides, noting that de la Espriella had not helped in any way to pass the law; they asserted that de la Espriella’s law firm had mistreated the Cely family. Adriana Cely claimed that de la Espriella tried to offer her a contract with clauses that she personally found questionable and restrictive; among them was a provision stating that she could not disclose the contract to any media outlet, and that the compensation money intended for the victim would have to be managed directly by the de la Espriella law firm. Juliana Cely, the daughter of Rosa Elvira Cely, publicly stated that "It disgusts me to see how de la Espriella is using my story", noting that the politician was manipulating the story of her mother's death for political propaganda, despite failing to support her family in 2012.

== Presidency (2026–present) ==
De la Espriella took the oath of office on 7 August 2026 during his inauguration in Cali. In attendance were Argentinian president Javier Milei, Chilean president José Antonio Kast, Ecuadorian president Daniel Noboa, Spanish king Felipe VI, as well as acting American attorney general Todd Blanche and FIFA head Gianni Infantino. His 18 cabinet members were inaugurated during a ceremony at the Pichincha Battalion military base in Cali. Prior to his inauguration, de la Espriella announced that he would move the presidential office to the Palacio de San Carlos and turn the Casa de Nariño into a museum, but reversed course the following month after he had taken office, with authorities citing security concerns.

On 10 August, De la Espriella announced that the Colombian military killed six alleged members of illegal armed groups, in the first major events in a large-scale security operation he ordered when he took office. Four of those killed were said to have been FARC dissidents and included the commander of Front 28, while two others were part of the Clan del Golfo drug cartel.

That same day, the 2026 Colombia earthquake occurred, prompting him to declare a state of emergency on 10 August and an economic emergency on 12 August. The Colombian government decides to accept aid only from countries ideologically close to de la Espriella. Thus, only rescue workers sent by the United States, Ecuador, El Salvador, and Israel were authorized to intervene in the affected areas.

On 8 September 2026, de la Espriella signed a decree lifting the nationwide suspension of permits to carry firearms that had been in place since 2015.

In October 2026, two months after taking office, his approval rating stood at 49%, Lower than that of his predecessor at that time during their respective presidencies. Espriella is more popular among the wealthy than the poor, among men than women, and among Protestants than Catholics.

On the 27 October 2026, Colombia approved of 300 American troops to enter the country to help train the Colombian military to fight drug cartels and illegal miners. On the same day, De la Espriella led a crackdown against crime in Medellín.

On October 29, De la Espriella expanded his crackdown to Bogotá. 172 people were reported to have been arrested in the city.

On October 30, Colombian military personnel were deployed to Cucuta near the border with Venezuela after a bomb went off and injured police officers and civilians the day prior.

=== Cabinet ===
- Vice President: José Manuel Restrepo
- Minister of the Interior: Rodrigo Lara Restrepo
- Minister of Foreign Affairs: Omar Bula
- Minister of Finance and Public Credit: Miguel Gómez Martínez
- Minister of Justice and Law: Iván Cancino
- Minister of Defence: Jorge Mora López
- Minister of Agriculture and Rural Development: Indalecio Dangond
- Minister of Mines and Energy: María Nohemí Arboleda
- Minister of Commerce, Industry and Tourism: Mauricio Gómez Amín
- Minister of National Education: Viviane Morales
- Minister of Environment and Sustainable Development: Fabio Arjona
- Minister of Housing, City and Territory: Jaime Andrés Beltrán
- Minister of Information Technologies and Communications: Alexandra Falla Zerrate
- Minister of Transport: Elsa Noguera
- Minister of Culture: Paola Holguín
- Minister of Sports: Juliana Gutiérrez
- Minister of Science, Technology and Innovation: Claudia Benavides Salazar
- Minister of Health and Social Protection: Ana María Vesga
- Minister of Labour: Natalia López Fuentes

== Political views ==
De la Espriella has been widely described as right-wing or far-right. He supports the right to bear arms, withdrawing Colombia from international organizations such as the Inter-American Court of Human Rights and the United Nations. He has said he would authorize the police to shoot at protesters they deem to be violent. He has also threatened to kill suspects of drug trafficking by downing planes and shooting boats, which has been "widely denounced as a form of extrajudicial killing, effectively denying suspects the chance of defending themselves in a court of law".

De la Espriella also supports implementing a security system similar to the one put in place by Nayib Bukele in El Salvador, citing as an example the creation of 10 mega-prisons across the country. He also clarified that he wants to eliminate the National Penitentiary and Prison Institute (INPEC), the government agency that regulates prison conditions based on various policies aimed at ensuring the safety, custody, and eventual rehabilitation of inmates. De La Esprilla described the current INPEC's operations as a "den of bandits". He clarified that the new megaprisons would be administered by private entities with their own regulatory systems, independent of the Ministry of Justice or other oversight bodies.

In February 2025, de la Espriella met with right-wing Congressman Miguel Abraham Polo Polo to discuss security issues in his potential administration as part of his podcast Tertulias Defensor. De la Espriella clarified: "If I’d been a paramilitary, I would've picked up a rifle and put on a uniform because I've got the guts to do what needs to be done. I wouldn't have been like Petro, who was just a coffee-shop guerrilla fighter; I would've been a real, real paramilitary. I'm not cut out for half-measures, you take away the rhetoric from this mangy plague of leftists."

De la Espriella said he wants to restore diplomatic ties with Israel, which had been severed by the Colombian government in protest against the Gaza war. He further announced that he would open an embassy in Jerusalem, thereby breaking with Colombia's traditional position on the conflict. In late 2025, he met with Israeli foreign minister Gideon Sa'ar, to whom he promised to "strengthen the bonds of friendship and cooperation" between Colombia and Israel. De la Espriella has also expressed staunch support for Israeli Prime Minister Benjamin Netanyahu. In an August 2025 interview, when questioned about the military offensive in Gaza, he stated that "the State of Israel, Prime Minister Netanyahu, is doing what they have to do to defend their people", adding that he would take similar measures to defend Colombia against terrorism, stating he would not "kneel before terrorism." These statements drew severe backlash from opposition figures and human rights commentators, who condemned his rhetoric as an explicit justification of the mass casualties and destruction in the Gaza Strip. Following his victory in the June 2026 presidential election, Netanyahu publicly congratulated de la Espriella on social media, stating that "friends of Israel keep winning." In August 2026, Colombia officially recognized Israeli sovereignty over the Golan Heights, becoming the second UN member country to do so following the United States, which did so in 2019 during the first Trump administration.

De la Espriella is supportive of economic laissez-faire policies and the elimination of ministries. He also has supported the bombing of alleged "narco-terrorist camps" and fumigation of coca plantations with the help of U.S. aircraft, in addition to ending the peace processes with Colombian armed groups. De la Espriella is an admirer of U.S. President Donald Trump, and has said that he wants to subordinate Colombia's foreign policy to that of the United States. He welcomed the U.S. attack against Venezuela in January 2026 and has repeatedly stated that any future diplomatic relationship with Venezuela would be channeled through the U.S. Department of State. He announced his intention to join Trump's Shield of the Americas. De la Espriella publicly stated that he supports regime change in Cuba following the 2026 Cuban crisis, as well as the country's annexation by the United States as a territory in free association similar in status to Puerto Rico. De la Espriella had also supported ICE's actions regarding the detention of Colombian refugees and political asylum seekers in the U.S., including the opposition journalist Beto Coral, who was detained in Arizona during the Colombian elections. Furthermore, de la Espriella also met with Republican Senator Bernie Moreno to discuss the immigration of Colombians to the United States in late June 2026. De la Espriella stated that he would work with US immigration authorities to facilitate the immediate deportation of political asylum seekers from Colombia, as well as to reform immigration procedures to make it much more difficult for Colombians to enter the US.

He opposes abortion and same-sex adoption, stating that his positions prioritize "traditional Judeo-Christian principles and values". He has espoused views often connected to anti-LGBTQ rhetoric, alleging that schools are trying to indoctrinate children with "gender ideology". De la Espriella has further made clear his intention to limit the power and influence of FECODE, the country's main teachers' union, as well as to propose reforms to the education system to include a more active approach to teaching traditional religious values.

Among de la Espriella's proposals is the Reforma Integral del Estado, inspired by Javier Milei's "chainsaw" policy of budget cuts, which aims to reduce the size of the government by 40%, including the elimination of entire ministries, in order to cut unnecessary costs; it is estimated that approximately 700,000 government employees and contractors would be affected. In addition, de la Espriella has also proposed the deregulation and partial elimination of various procedures across different government agencies, including a comprehensive review of entities such as INVIMA, the government agency responsible for enforcing regulations governing the distribution and approval of medicines, as well as the Colombian Agricultural Institute (ICA), which is responsible for establishing regulations regarding farm sanitary standards.

De la Espriella has expressed disapproval of the 2016 Peace Accords as well as the functioning of the JEP, the transitional justice mechanism responsible for investigating crimes and human rights violations committed during the conflicts, suggesting the possibility of eliminating it entirely, citing deficiencies in its procedures and a lack of positive results. He has also expressed interest in integrating artificial intelligence into various government agencies, including the DIAN, the government agency responsible for tax collection. De La Espriella has also publicly stated that his administration wants to form partnerships with various companies owned by Elon Musk, citing a possible collaboration to provide internet access to much of the rural areas using Starlink technology.

== Personal life ==
De la Espriella was an atheist for a number of years, but converted to Catholicism and "raises the conservative banners of several supporting Christian churches". He is married to Ana Lucía Pineda, with whom he has four children.

== Notes ==
Political offices
Preceded by Gustavo Petro	President of Colombia; 2026–present	Incumbent
