= Senator Hernandez =

Senator Hernandez (or Hernández) may refer to:

== Colombia (Senate of the Republic) ==
- Jota Pe Hernández (born 1992)
- Rodolfo Hernández Suárez (1945–2024)

== Mexico (Senate of the Republic) ==
- Citlalli Hernández (born 1990)
- Héctor Javier Hernández (born 1958)
- Humberto Hernández Haddad (born 1951)
- Ismael Hernández (born 1964)
- Lisbeth Hernández Lecona (born 1974)
- Minerva Hernández Ramos (born 1969)

== United States state senate members ==
- Anna Hernandez (fl. 2020s), Arizona State Senate
- Ed Hernandez (born 1957), California State Senate
- Miguel Hernández Agosto (1927–2016), Senate of Puerto Rico
- Rafael Hernández Colón (1936–2019), Senate of Puerto Rico
