= Rosa Yolanda Villavicencio =

Colombian-Spanish economist and politician (born 1962)

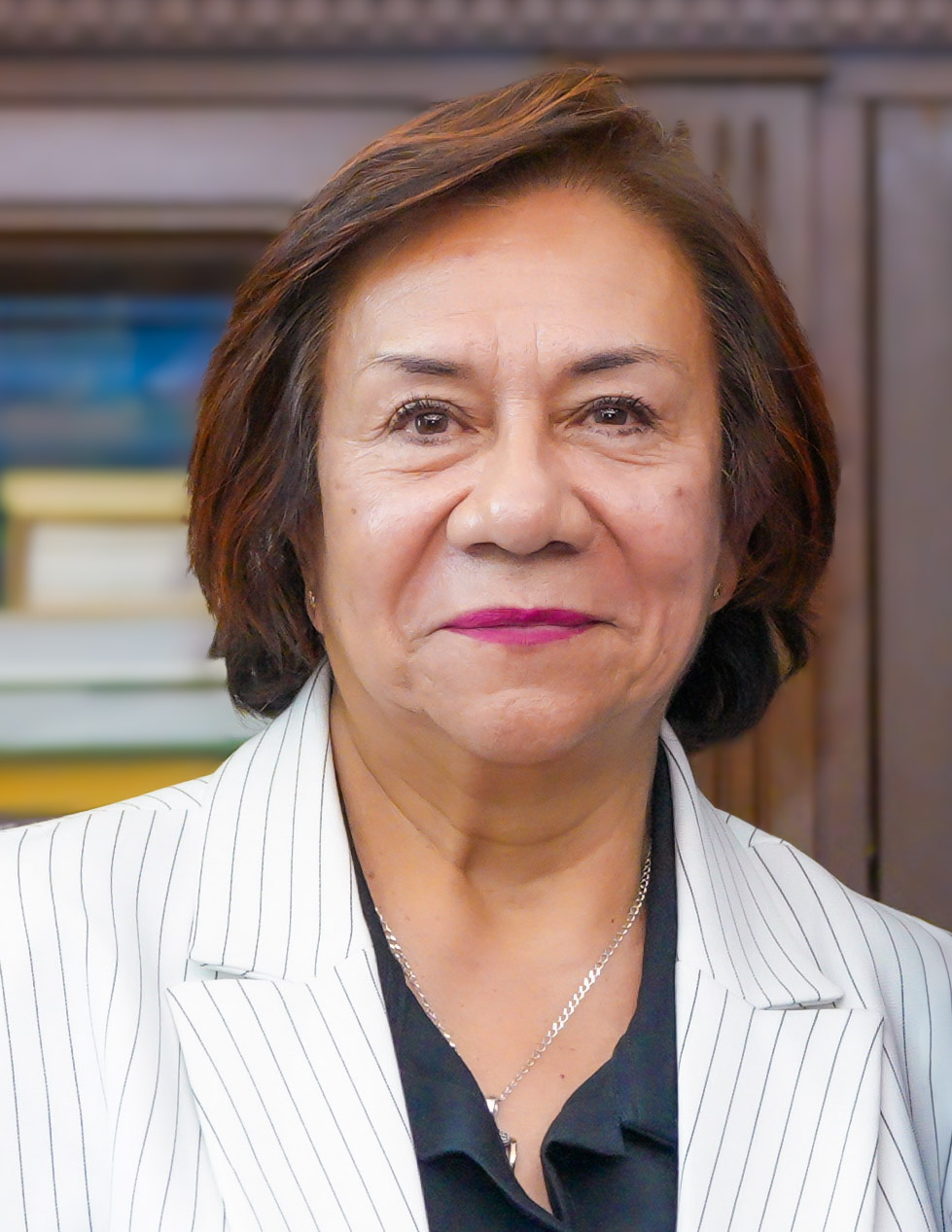
- Villavicencio in July 2025

Minister of Foreign Affairs of Colombia
- In office 8 July 2025 – 7 August 2026
- President: Gustavo Petro
- Deputy: Herself (acting); Juana Castro
- Preceded by: Laura Sarabia
- Succeeded by: Omar Bula

Deputy Minister of Foreign Affairs of Colombia
- In office 5 June 2025 – 3 October 2025
- President: Gustavo Petro
- Preceded by: Daniel Ávila
- Succeeded by: Juana Castro

Member of the Assembly of Madrid
- In office 11 June 2007 – 7 June 2011
- Parliamentary group: Socialist

Personal details
- Born: Rosa Yolanda Villavicencio Mapy; 13 September 1962 (age 64) Bogotá, Colombia
- Citizenship: Colombia (1962–present); Spain (1994–2025; 2026–present)
- Party: Historic Pact (2026–present)
- Other political affiliations: Workers' Socialist Party (?–1987); PSOE (1999–c. 2012); Historic Pact for Colombia (2022–2025); Humane Colombia (2018–2026)
- Children: 1
- Education: Cooperative University of Colombia; Complutense University of Madrid
- Profession: Economist

Rosa Yolanda Villavicencio Mapy (Note: Latin American Spanish pronunciation: [ˈrosa ʝoˈlanda βiʝaβiˈsensjo ˈmapi].) (born 13 September 1962) is a Colombian-Spanish economist and politician who served as Minister of Foreign Affairs of Colombia between 2025 and 2026.

Born in Bogotá, she graduated in 1984 with a degree in economics from the Cooperative University of Colombia. As a member of the Socialist Party of Madrid, she served as a member of the Madrid Assembly, spending a long time in Spain.

In July 2025, President Gustavo Petro appointed Villavicencio Minister of Foreign Affairs following the resignation of Laura Sarabia, making her the first foreign minister of indigenous descent in the history of Colombia.

== Early life and education ==
Rosa Yolanda Villavicencio Mapy was born in Bogotá to a Colombian mother of indigenous descent and an Ecuadorian father; her mother had fled political unrest in Tolima in the 1950s. The family, living in difficult economic conditions amid the Colombian conflict, briefly moved to Ecuador between 1968 and 1971; her father spent three years in New York City as an undocumented migrant.

She pursued a bachelor's degree in Economics from the Cooperative University of Colombia in 1984. In 1987, after being fired because of her activities as a trade unionist and her affiliation with the Workers' Socialist Party, she relocated to the outskirts of Madrid, Spain. She has held a specialty in International Cooperation for Development from the Complutense University of Madrid, as well as a master's degree in Migration and Intercommunity Relations, since 2023.

== Career ==
In 1999, Villavicencio joined the Madrilenian wing of the Spanish Socialist Workers' Party (PSOE) and was elected to the Assembly of Madrid for the VIII Legislature (2007–2011), the first non-Spanish woman to hold the position in Madrid and the second in Spain overall. As a parliamentarian, she was a member of various committees, including Education, Women, and Immigration. She has also written op-eds for multiple publications, including El Plural.

Before taking up the office of Deputy Minister, Villavicencio had worked at the District Government Secretariat (2015–2016) and as president (1997–?) and secretary-general (2016–2022) of the Spanish NGO AESCO (America, Spain, Solidarity and Cooperation), which she co-founded; she had been employed at the Ministry of Foreign Affairs since 2022, as, among other things, the coordinator of the working group Colombia nos une ("Colombia Unites Us"), which offers services to Colombians living abroad.

== Controversy ==
The choice of Villavicencio as Deputy Foreign Minister was met with some criticism for her limited knowledge of foreign languages and for lacking a diplomatic background, in contrast with her predecessor Daniel Ávila.

In addition, she has been investigated for allegedly providing benefits to AESCO while working at the Ministry, in violation of the norms regulating conflicts of interest, and for purported mismanagement at Colombian consulates in Spain; she was nominated despite pending court decisions.

== Personal life ==
Villavicencio lived in Madrid, where she had moved with her husband and daughter (born 1984), for over twenty-five years. She became a naturalized Spanish citizen in 1994, but renounced her dual citizenship upon assuming the office of Foreign Minister, in accordance with Colombian law. In November 2026, the Spanish government re-established her Spanish nationality.

== Books ==
- Una sudaca en el Parlamento (2011); ISBN 8-4694-7939-3, EAN 9788469479391
- Caracterización de la experiencia migratoria de colombianos en el extranjero (2019, co-author); ASIN B07VKC1NGH

== Note ==
Political offices
Preceded by Daniel Ávila	Deputy Minister of Foreign Affairs; 2025	Succeeded by Juana Castro Santamaría
Preceded by Laura Sarabia	Minister of Foreign Affairs; 2025-2026	Succeeded by Omar Bula
