= Iván Cancino =

Colombian politician (born 1976)

Minister of Justice and Law
- Incumbent
- Assumed office 7 August 2026
- President: Abelardo de la Espriella
- Preceded by: Jorge Iván Cuervo

Personal details
- Born: Iván Cancino González; 4 July 1976 (age 50) Bogotá, Colombia
- Party: National Salvation Movement (since 2020)
- Other political affiliations: Liberal (1998–2010)
- Education: Universidad Externado de Colombia (BBL)

Iván Cancino González (born 4 July 1976) is a Colombian lawyer and politician who is serves as the Minister of Justice and Law.

Born in Bogotá, he studied law at the Universidad Externado de Colombia.

== Early life and career ==
Iván Cancino González was born on July 4, 1976, in Bogotá to Antonio Cancino and Emilce González. His father was President Ernesto Samper's lawyer during the 8000 Process. His mother served as dean of the Law School at Universidad Externado de Colombia.

In 2025, he represented Diego Cadena, then the lawyer for President Álvaro Uribe. Cancino is a member of the Colombian Bar Association and the International Foundation for Criminal Sciences.
