= Aida Quilcué =

Colombian politician (born 1973)

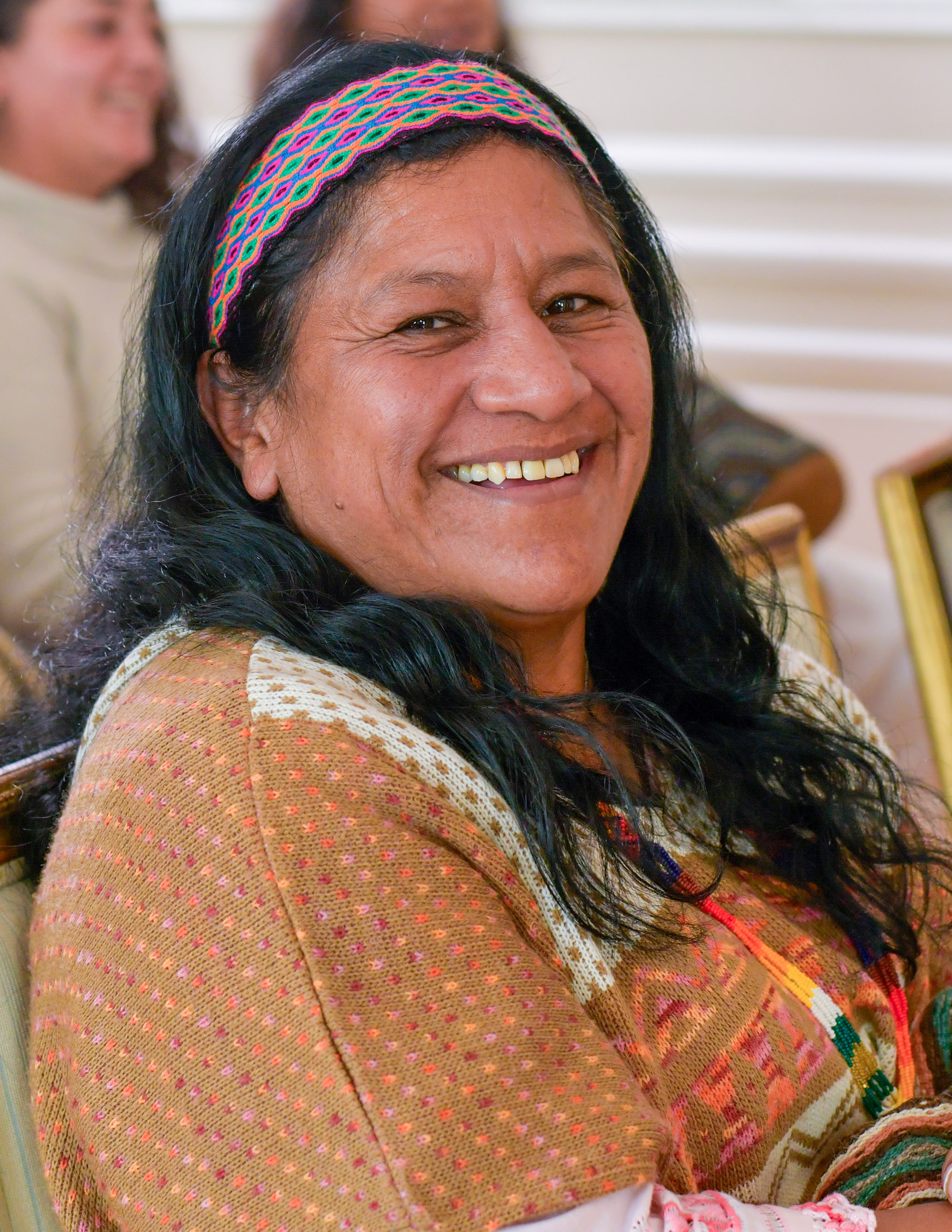
- Quilcué in 2024

Senator of Colombia
- Incumbent
- Assumed office 20 July 2022

Personal details
- Born: Aida Marina Quilcué Vivas; 2 February 1973 (age 53) Páez, Cauca, Colombia
- Party: Alternative Indigenous and Social Movement (2000-present); Historic Pact (2026-present)
- Other political affiliations: Historic Pact for Colombia (2021-2025)
- Spouse: Edwin Legarda (m. 2002; died 2008)

Aida Marina Quilcué Vivas (born 2 February 1973) is a Colombian politician and Indigenous civil leader who has served as a Senator of Colombia since 2022. A member of the Alternative Indigenous and Social Movement, she has served as a human rights advisor for UNESCO.

In 1990, she was a health promoter for the Indigenous Association of Cauca. In 2009, she served as Senior Advisor to the Regional Indigenous Council of Cauca, and subsequently, in 2010, she became the first woman to lead the council.

In 2022, she received the endorsement of the Indigenous Social Alternative Movement as a candidate for the Senate representing the Indigenous constituency, obtaining more than 45,000 votes.

== Biography ==
On 10 February 2026, Quilcue and two of her bodyguards were abducted by unidentified individuals while traveling in an SUV in Cauca Department. They were released hours later following an ultimatum from president Gustavo Petro.

On 9 March 2026, Quilcue was announced as the vice-presidential candidate to be with Iván Cepeda.

== Political career ==
=== Indigenous and social leadership ===
Her political activity originated within the indigenous social movement. In the 1990s, she began her public service as a health promoter for the Association of Indigenous Clinics of Cauca (AIC) and as a local authority in the Piçkwe Tha Fiw reservation. In 2000, she was coordinator of the health program at the AIC and at the Regional Indigenous Council of Huila (CRIHU).

Between 2003 and 2009, Quilcué was appointed Senior Counselor of the Regional Indigenous Council of Cauca (CRIC)

Between 2003 and 2006, she served within the Regional Indigenous Council of Cauca (CRIC), an organization in which she would eventually become the first woman to hold the position of Senior Counselor (Legal Representative), being one of the organizers of the 2008 Indigenous Minga in which thousands of indigenous people participated who marched to Bogotá in protest to denounce the human rights situation under the Democratic Security policy. In this mobilization, the 2008 Indigenous Minga for Social and Community Resistance, her husband Edwin Legarda died on 16 December in a hospital in Popayán after receiving three rifle shots fired by soldiers on the road that connects Inzá with Totoró, in the department of Cauca. During the trial and In subsequent years, Quilcué and her daughter have been victims of death threats and attacks.

She has also held national and international representation roles, as a counselor for the National Indigenous Organization of Colombia (ONIC) between 2016 and 2020, and as an expert member of the United Nations Permanent Forum on Indigenous Issues and as a consultant for UNESCO on peace and human rights issues.

=== Senator of the Republic (2022–2026) ===
In the 2022 elections, she secured a seat in the Senate through the Special Indigenous Constituency under the banner of the MAIS party, receiving over 45,000 votes. In Congress, she is a member of the First Constitutional Commission and the Human Rights Commission. Her legislative initiatives have included bills to prevent and punish political violence and harassment against women, reforms for the recognition of social and critical thinking as a basis for peace education, and defense of transitional justice and the implementation of the 2016 Peace Agreement.

=== Vice-presidential candidacy (2026) ===
On March 9, 2026, the Historic Pact party officially announced Quilcué as the vice-presidential running mate for presidential candidate Iván Cepeda for that year's elections.

== Awards and recognition ==
In 2021, Quilcué won the National Award for the Defense of Human Rights in Colombia in the category "Defense for a Whole Life".
