= Juan Daniel Oviedo =

Colombian economist and politician (born 1977)

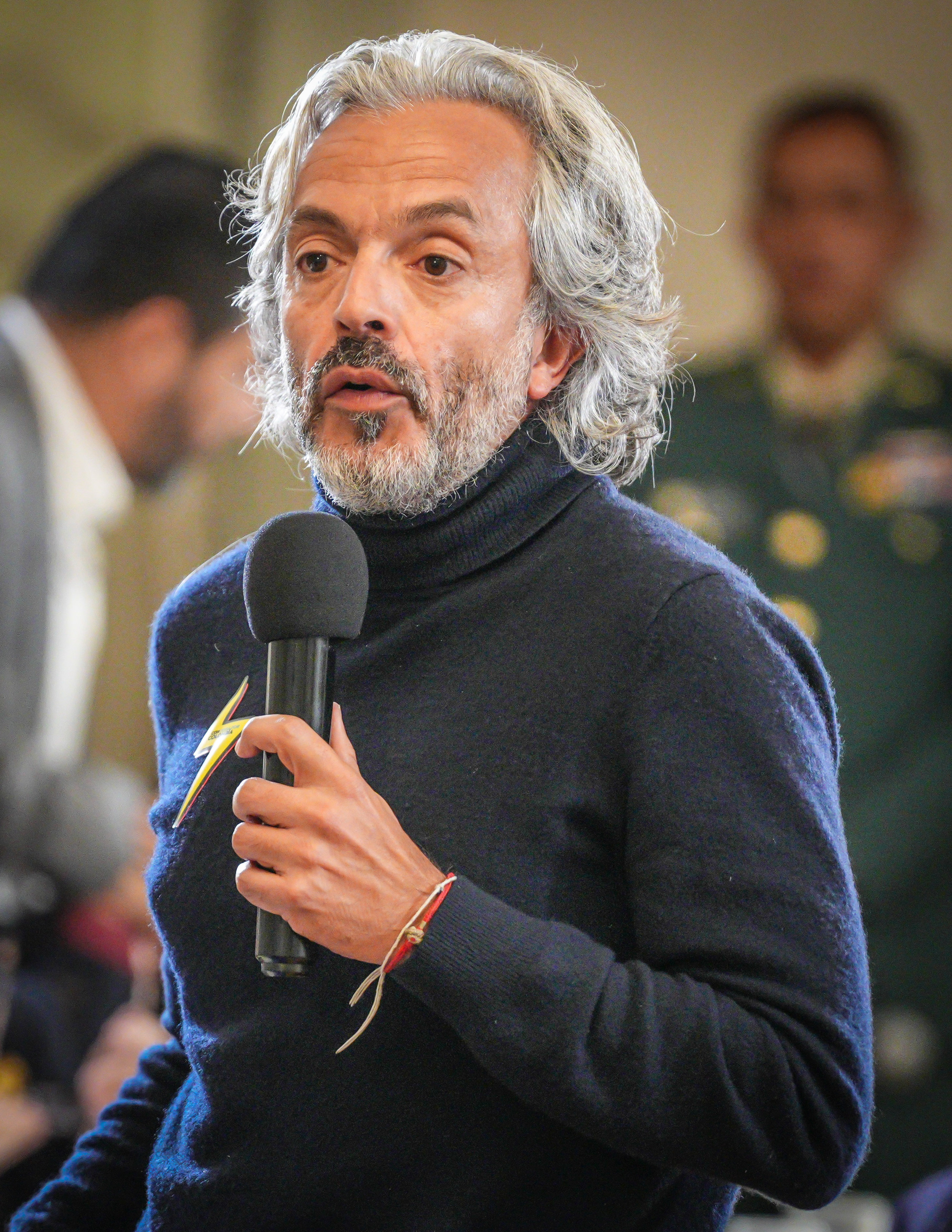
- Oviedo in 2025

Director of the National Administrative Department of Statistics
- In office 7 August 2018 – 7 August 2022
- President: Iván Duque
- Preceded by: Mauricio Perfetti
- Succeeded by: Piedad Urdinola

Personal details
- Born: 16 March 1977 (age 49)
- Party: Con Toda por Colombia

Juan Daniel Oviedo Arango (born 16 March 1977) is a Colombian economist and politician. From 2018 to 2022, he served as director of the National Administrative Department of Statistics. From 2024 to 2025, he was a city councillor of Bogotá. In the 2023 municipal elections, he was a candidate for mayor of Bogotá. In the 2026 presidential election, he was a candidate for vice president of Colombia.

== Personal life ==
Oviedo Arango is gay.
