= Jaime Andrés Beltrán =

Colombian politician

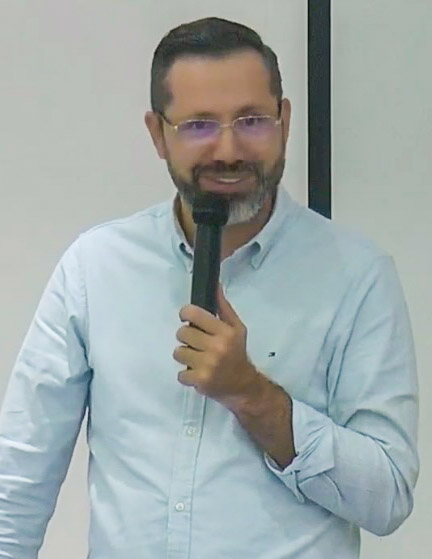
- Beltrán in 2024

Minister of Housing, City and Territory
- Incumbent
- Assumed office 7 August 2026
- President: Abelardo de la Espriella (elect)
- Preceded by: Helga Rivas

Mayor of Bucaramanga
- In office 1 January 2024 – 21 August 2025
- Preceded by: Juan Carlos Cárdenas Rey
- Succeeded by: Eduard Sánchez (acting)

Member of the Bucaramanga City Council
- In office 1 January 2012 – 1 January 2024

Personal details
- Born: Jaime Andrés Beltrán Martínez; 10 July 1980 (age 46) Bucaramanga, Colombia
- Party: National Salvation Movement (since 2025)
- Other political affiliations: Liberal Party (2011–2019); Colombia Justa Libres (2019–2025)
- Spouse: Paula Andrea Ramírez
- Children: 2
- Education: Autonomous University of Bucaramanga

Jaime Andrés Beltrán Martínez (born 10 July 1980) is a Colombian politician who was nominated as Minister of Housing, City and Territory by Abelardo de la Espriella, President-elect of Colombia.

He was elected mayor of Bucaramanga in the 2023 local elections. On 21 August 2025, the Council of State annulled his election due to "double affiliation" (holding simultaneous membership in more than one political party), resulting in his removal from office and the scheduling of new elections for the same year.
