= Totoró, Cauca =

Coordinates: 2°30′42″N 76°24′01″W

- Municipality and town
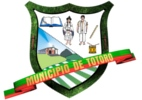
- Flag Coat of arms

- Location of the municipality and town of Totoró, Cauca in the Cauca Department of Colombia.
- Country: Colombia
- Department: Cauca Department

Population (Census 2018)
  - Total: 20,870
- Time zone: UTC-5 (Colombia Standard Time)
- Climate: Cfb
- Website: http://totoro-cauca.gov.co

Totoró is a town and municipality in the Cauca Department, Colombia.

== Climate ==
Totoró has a subtropical highland climate (Köppen Cfb). It has moderate rainfall year-round. It is the cloudiest and least sunny town in the world.

Climate data for Totoró (Gabriel Lopez), elevation 3,000 m (9,800 ft), (1981–2010)
Month	Jan	Feb	Mar	Apr	May	Jun	Jul	Aug	Sep	Oct	Nov	Dec	Year
Mean daily maximum °C (°F)	15.8 (60.4)	15.7 (60.3)	15.9 (60.6)	15.5 (59.9)	15.2 (59.4)	14.4 (57.9)	13.8 (56.8)	14.1 (57.4)	14.9 (58.8)	15.4 (59.7)	15.4 (59.7)	15.7 (60.3)	15.2 (59.4)
Daily mean °C (°F)	10.5 (50.9)	10.5 (50.9)	10.6 (51.1)	10.7 (51.3)	10.6 (51.1)	10.2 (50.4)	9.8 (49.6)	10.0 (50.0)	10.4 (50.7)	10.6 (51.1)	10.6 (51.1)	10.5 (50.9)	10.4 (50.7)
Mean daily minimum °C (°F)	5.3 (41.5)	5.7 (42.3)	6.0 (42.8)	6.6 (43.9)	6.8 (44.2)	6.9 (44.4)	6.5 (43.7)	6.4 (43.5)	6.2 (43.2)	6.1 (43.0)	6.1 (43.0)	5.8 (42.4)	6.2 (43.2)
Average precipitation mm (inches)	65.8 (2.59)	64.7 (2.55)	85.1 (3.35)	96.9 (3.81)	105.6 (4.16)	89.2 (3.51)	116.4 (4.58)	79.9 (3.15)	72.0 (2.83)	101.0 (3.98)	105.5 (4.15)	68.2 (2.69)	1,048.3 (41.27)
Average precipitation days	13	14	17	20	22	22	23	21	17	19	19	14	214
Average relative humidity (%)	79	78	79	79	80	81	81	81	79	79	79	78	80
Mean monthly sunshine hours	74.4	56.5	58.9	45.0	46.5	33.0	40.3	52.7	54.0	46.5	45.0	52.7	605.5
Mean daily sunshine hours	2.4	2.0	1.9	1.5	1.5	1.1	1.3	1.7	1.8	1.5	1.5	1.7	1.7
Source: Instituto de Hidrologia Meteorologia y Estudios Ambientales
