= Sergio Arboleda University =

University in Bogotá, Colombia

Coordinates: 4.6611°N 74.0597°W

- Universidad Sergio Arboleda
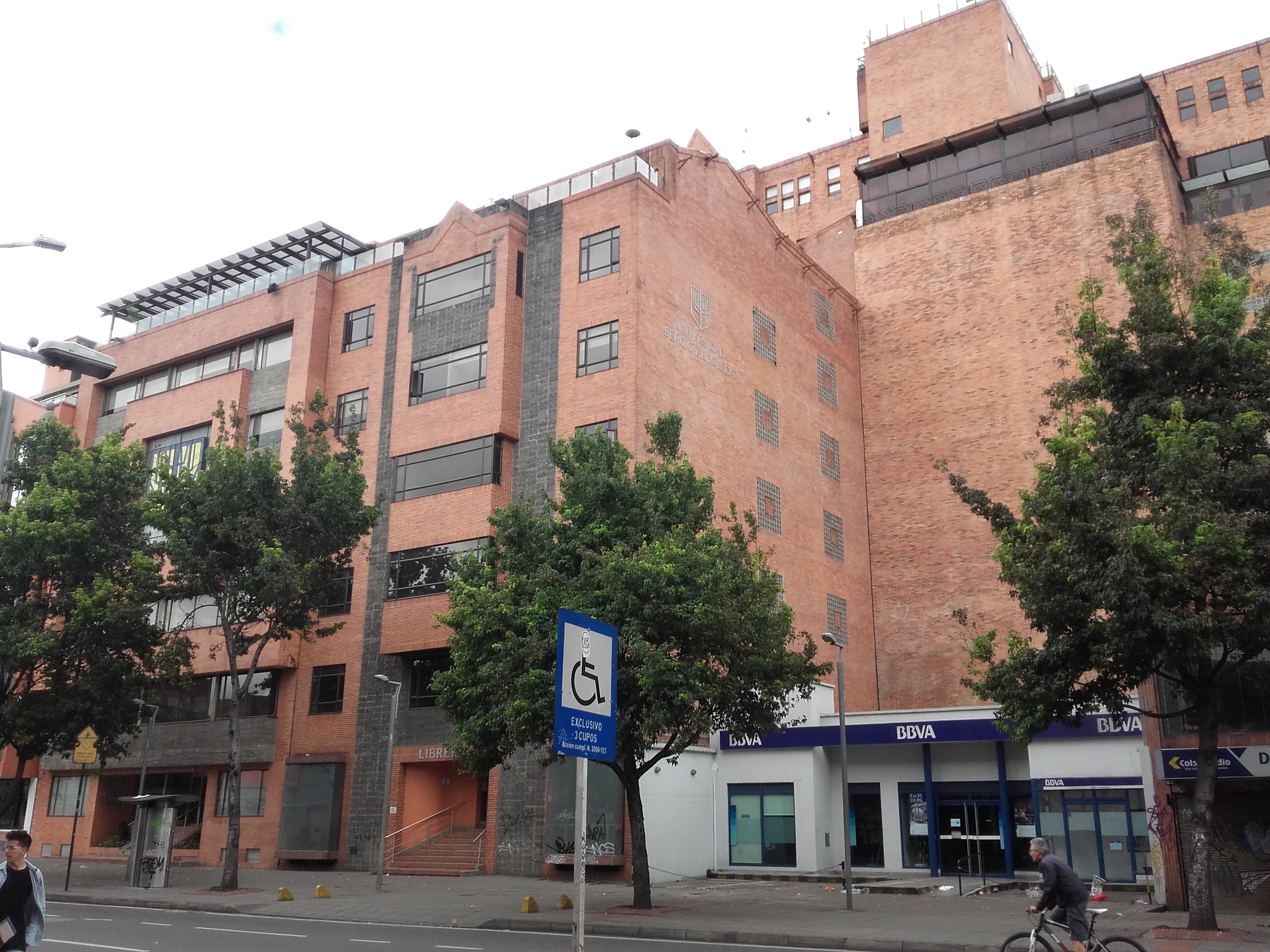
- Motto: 'Donde tú sí cuentas'
- Type: Private
- Principal: Rodrigo Noguera Calderón
- Location: Calle 74 No. 14 – 14, Bogotá, Colombia
- Campus: Urban
- Website: www.usergioarboleda.edu.co

Sergio Arboleda University (Spanish: Universidad Sergio Arboleda) is a university located in Bogotá, Colombia, with sectionals located in Barranquilla, Santa Marta, and Spain. The university was founded in 1984.

== Notable alumni ==
- Abelardo de la Espriella, president of Colombia (2026-present).
- Ivan Duque, former president of Colombia (2018-2022).
