= Defenders of the Homeland (Colombia) =

Defenders of the Homeland Defensores de la Patria
- Leader: Abelardo de la Espriella
- President: Mauricio Gómez Amín
- Founded: July 16, 2025
- Legalised: August 3, 2026
- Ideology: Ultraconservatism; Nationalism; Economic liberalism; Right-wing populism
- Political position: Far-right
- Slogan: Firmes por la Patria (Firm for the Nation)

Website
- Defensores de la Patria - Political Movement; Colombia Abelardista - Civilian Movement

Defenders of the Homeland (Spanish: Defensores de la Patria) is a far-right political party in Colombia, founded by Abelardo de la Espriella to support his candidacy for the 2026 presidential election. It is described as an anti-establishment and populist movement.

== History ==
During the first half of 2025, groups supporting De la Espriella began organizing on social media and at regional events. The political movement adopted a narrative centered on "defending freedom, democracy, security, and the constitution."

On July 16, 2025, De la Espriella registered the "Defenders of the Homeland" campaign committee with the National Registry, with the goal of collecting signatures for an independent presidential candidacy. The chosen slogan was "Firm for the Homeland".

On August 3, 2026, the Defenders of the Homeland became a political party.

== Election results ==
=== Presidential elections ===
| Year | Candidate | Running mate | votes (1st round) | % (1st round) | votes (2nd round) | % (2nd round) | Result | Note |
|---|---|---|---|---|---|---|---|---|
| 2026 | Abelardo de la Espriella | José Manuel Restrepo | 10,366,143 | 43.78% | 12,960,166 | 49.66% | ✓ Elected | Runoff victory against Iván Cepeda |

== See also ==
- List of political parties in Colombia
