= Carlos Caicedo =

Colombian politician (born 1965)

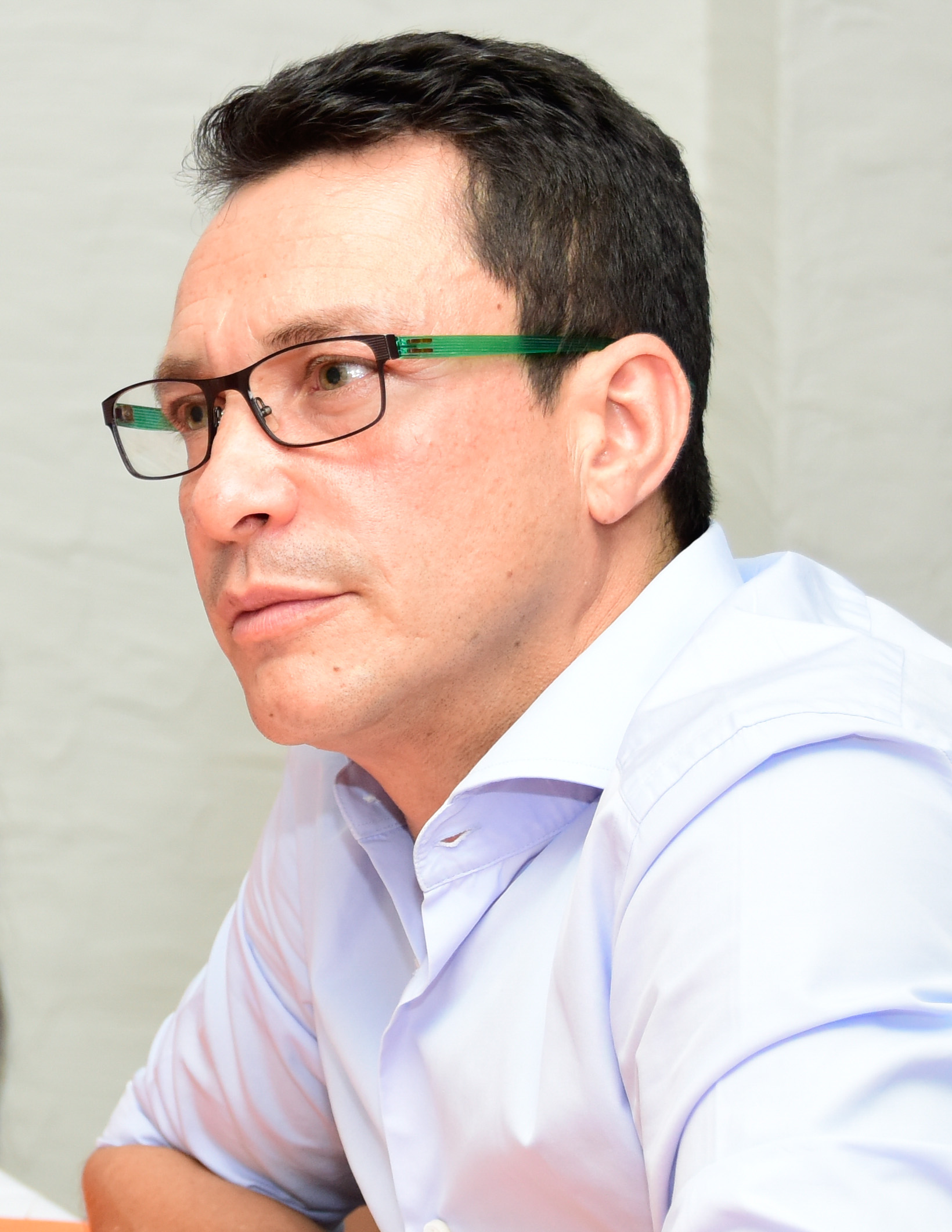
- Caicedo in 2022

Governor of Magdalena
- In office 1 January 2020 – 13 October 2023
- Preceded by: Rosa Cotes Vives
- Succeeded by: Denise Rangel Lozano

Personal details
- Born: 3 October 1965 (age 61)
- Party: Fuerza Ciudadana

Carlos Eduardo Caicedo Omar (born 3 October 1965) is a Colombian politician. From 2020 to 2023, he served as governor of Magdalena. From 2012 to 2015, he served as mayor of Santa Marta.

In July 2026 he was accused of sexual abuse of a minor.
