= Mauricio Gómez Amín =

Colombian politician (born 1981)

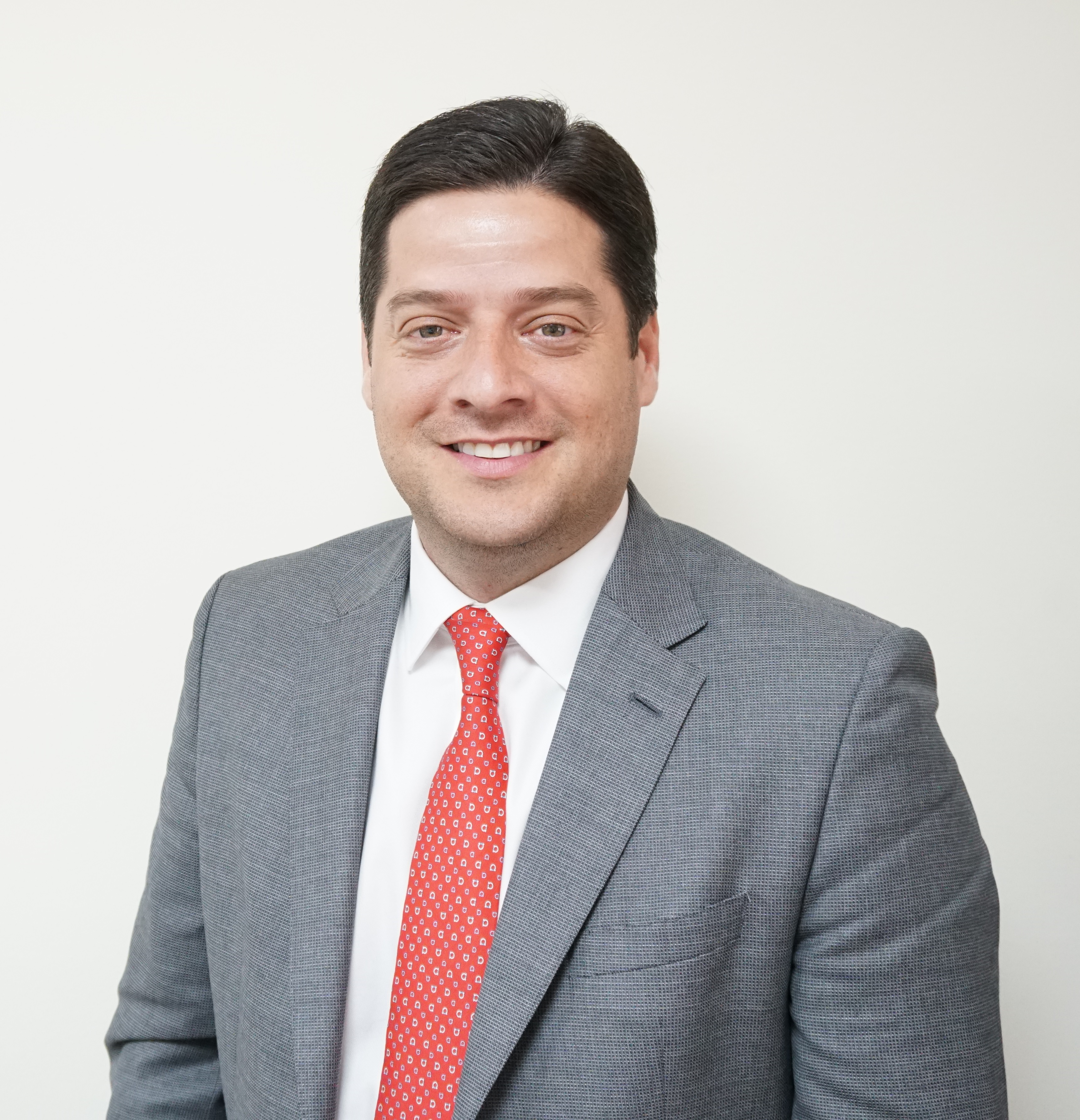
- Official portrait, 2018

Minister of Commerce, Industry and Tourism
- Nominee
- Assumed office 7 August 2026
- President: Abelardo de la Espriella
- Preceded by: Diana Morales

President of Defenders of the Homeland
- Incumbent
- Assumed office 5 May 2026
- Preceded by: Party established

Senator of Colombia
- In office 20 July 2018 – 5 May 2026

Member of the Chamber of Representatives of Colombia
- In office 20 July 2014 – 20 July 2018
- Constituency: Atlántico Department

Member of the Barranquilla City Council
- In office 1 January 2008 – 4 September 2013

Personal details
- Born: 31 March 1982 (age 44) Barranquilla, Atlántico, Colombia
- Party: Defenders of the Homeland (since 2026)
- Other political affiliations: Liberal Party (2004–2026)
- Children: 2
- Education: Universidad del Norte
- Occupation: Lawyer • Politician

Mauricio Gómez Amín (born 31 March 1982) is a Colombian lawyer and politician. Since 2026 he has been the president of the far-right Defenders of the Homeland, the political party of President Abelardo de la Espriella.

He has served as councilman of Barranquilla between 2004 and 2007, twice councilman of Barranquilla between 2008 and 2013, Representative to the House for the Department of Atlántico 2014 – 2018, and is currently Senator of the Republic of Colombia and spokesman of the bench in the Senate.

== Biography ==
Mauricio Gómez Amin studied high school at Marymount School in the city of Barranquilla and his university career at the Universidad del Norte, obtaining a law degree and a specialist in public law.

=== Political career ===
Along with his university studies, Gómez Amin began his public career at the age of 24 as a councilman in the city of Barranquilla. Later, he was councilman of Barranquilla on two occasions, and in this position he supported the construction of steps and roads for the health system of the city and the mega-schools in the five localities.

=== Colombian Congressman ===
In the 2014 Colombian legislative elections, Mauricio Gómez was elected member of the Colombian House of Representatives for the department of Atlántico, and in that capacity, he led the political control debates that forced the National Government to take the decision to intervene the inefficient company Electricaribe. He is a member of Commission III of Economic Affairs and of the Commission of Territorial Planning.
