= Paloma Valencia =

Colombian politician (born 1978)

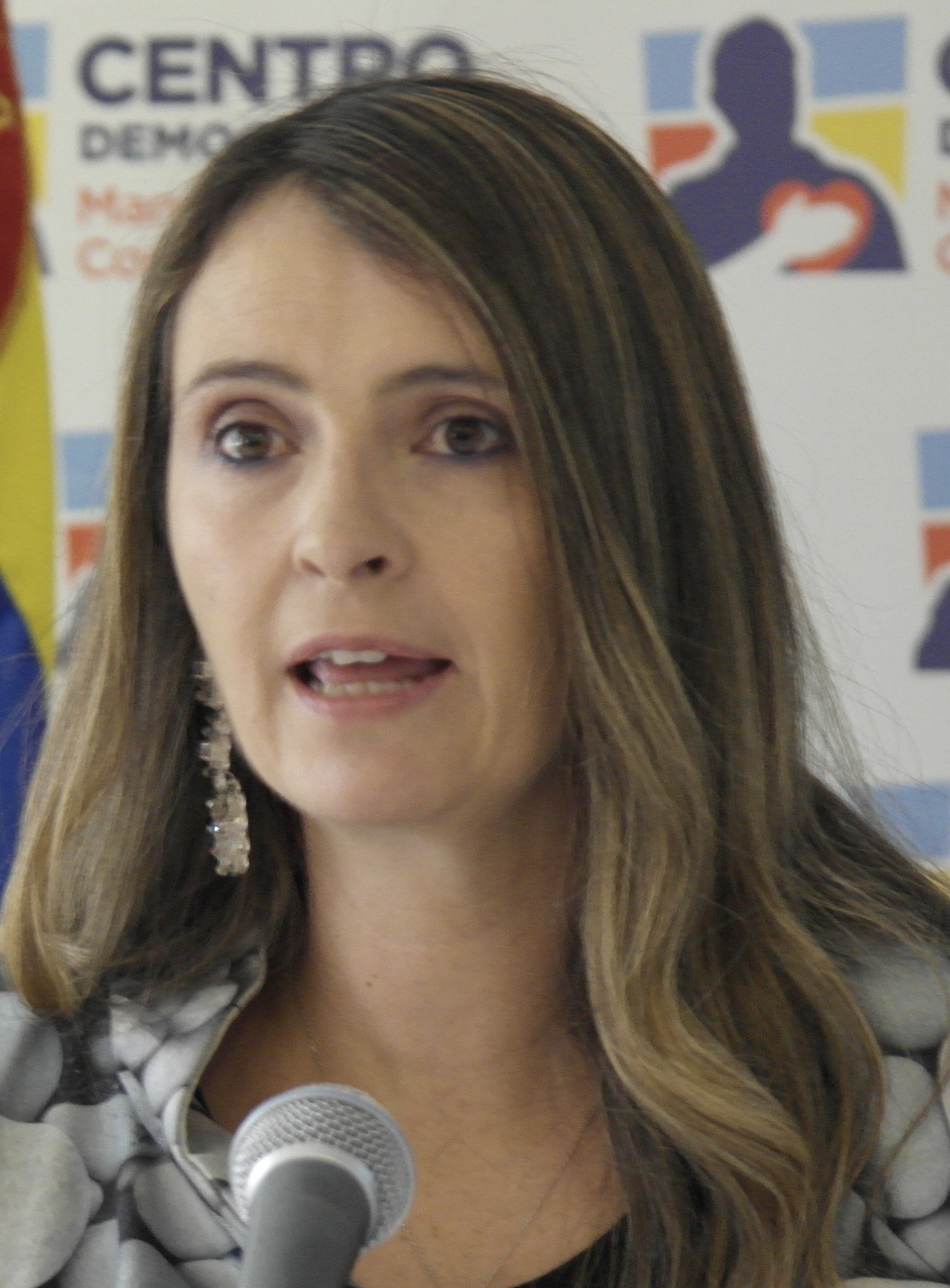
- Valencia in 2022

Senator of Colombia
- In office July 20, 2014 – July 20, 2026

Personal details
- Born: Paloma Susana Valencia Laserna; January 19, 1978 (age 48) Popayán, Cauca, Colombia
- Party: Democratic Centre (since 2013)
- Other political affiliations: Conservative Party (2002–2006); Somos Region Colombia (2006–2013)
- Spouse: Tomás Rodríguez (m. 2016)
- Children: 1
- Relatives: Valencia family
- Occupation: Lawyer • Professor • Politician

Paloma Susana Valencia Laserna (born January 19, 1978) is a Colombian philosopher, lawyer, writer and economist. A member of the Democratic Centre political party, she served as a Senator of Colombia from July 20, 2014 to July 20, 2026.

Born in Popayán, Cauca, Valencia is the granddaughter of President Guillermo León Valencia. She was a candidate in the 2026 Colombian presidential election but lost decisively in the first round.
