= Jota Pe Hernández =

Colombian politician (born 1992)

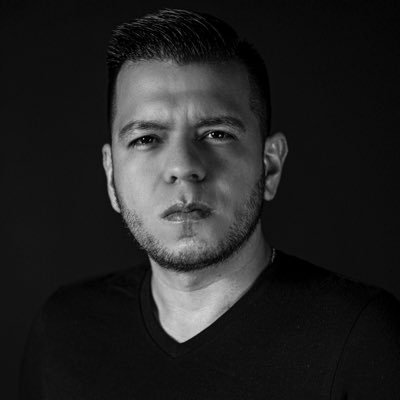
- Hernández in 2023

Member of the Senate
- Incumbent
- Assumed office 20 July 2022
- Constituency: Santander

Personal details
- Born: 6 January 1992 (age 34)
- Party: Green Alliance

TikTok information
- Page: jotapehernandez
- Followers: 1.5 million

YouTube information
- Channel: Jota Pe Hernández
- Genre: Politics
- Subscribers: 1.2 million
- Views: 15.3 million
- Last updated: 8 June 2025

Jonathan Ferney Pulido Hernández, better known as Jota Pe Hernández (born 6 January 1992), is a Colombian politician and Internet personality serving as a member of the Senate of Colombia since 2022. As of 2025, he has 1.5 million followers on Facebook and TikTok, and 1.2 million followers on YouTube.
