= María Adelaida Puerta =

Colombian actress (born 1982)

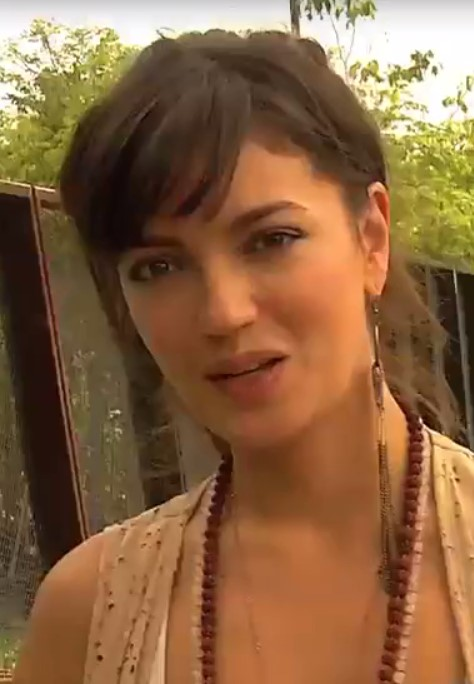
- Born: María Adelaida Puerta Restrepo; November 11, 1982 (age 43); Medellín, Colombia
- Occupation: Actress
- Years active: 2000 – present
- Notable work: Sin tetas no hay paraíso
- Awards: Best Antagonistic Actress in a Telenovela, Series or Miniseries (India Catalina Awards, 2010) Best New Actor or Actress of the Year (India Catalina Awards, 2007) Best Antagonistic Actress in a Telenovela (TVyNovelas Awards Colombia, 2010)

María Adelaida Puerta Restrepo (born 11 November 1982) is a Colombian actress known for her role as Catalina in the Colombian television series Sin tetas no hay paraíso by Caracol Televisión network and in El Capo by Canal RCN. Both of these roles earned her India Catalina Awards.

== Life ==
María Adelaida Puerta was born on 11 November 1982 in Medellín, Colombia.

At 19 years old, she left her home city of Medellín to live in Bogotá. There, she studied at the Teatro Libre de Bogotá and La Casa del Teatro Nacional. During this time, she also traveled to multiple countries, where she acquired more skills for her work as an actress.

She worked at Mapa Teatro, under directors Heidi Abderhalden and Rolf Abderhalden. In film, she worked with Felipe Aljure, Ricardo Gabrielli, Klych Lópezn, and Jaime Escallón.

She is based in México City, where she continues her career as an actress.

She has spoken about her interest in and practicing of yoga and meditation, which she has said helps her physical, mental, and spiritual well-being. Before leaving Colombia, she spent a year and a half teaching classes in yoga at women's prisons in Bogotá.

== Career ==
=== Television ===
Among her works in Colombian television, she has acted in Todos quieren con Marilyn by RCN Televisiónas Lina, El vuelo de la cometa as Victoria, and La mujer en el espejo.

In 2006, Caracol acquired the rights to produce the novel Sin tetas no hay paraíso by Colombian screenwriter and novelist Gustavo Bolívar as a television series of the same name. María Adelaida Puerta tried out for the main character of the novel, Catalina. Initially, she was denied the role, with the reasoning that she lacked the necessary qualities. But, when she was going to sign onto another project with RCN, they contacted her via Caracol and gave her the role.

Puerta's role in Sin tetas no hay paraíso earned her a India Catalina Awards ‘New Actress of the Year’ award at the 2007 Cartagena de Indias Festival, one of Colombia's most prestigious awards for film and television.

In 2007, she participated in Las profesionales, a su servicio by Caracol, in which she played Cassandra, an ambitious, calculating, and latter-climbing professional very different from her role as Catalina.

By the end of 2007, Caracol launched the telenovela Montecristo, in which Puerta played Victoria Sáenz.

In 2008, she starred in the sixth episode of the second season of Fox Latin America's Tiempo final as Viviana. In which she worked alongside David Carradine.

In 2009, she was in El Capo by RCN Televisión, where she played La Perrys, a faithful lieutenant in the service of 'El Capo' Pedro Pablo León Jaramillo (Marlon Moreno). For this performance, she won Best Antagonistic Actress at the 2010 India Catalina Awards and a Favorite Villain award at the 2010 TVyNovelas awards.

In 2012, she starred in La Mariposa, a Fox Telecolombia production for the MundoFox channel in the United States that is broadcast in Colombia by the RCN Channel.

=== Film ===
In film, she worked for Felipe Aljure in El colombian dream and Klych López in the short film Collar de perlas, winner of 'Proyecto 48' Award of the TNT cable channel, and shot in her native Medellín. There, she played Laura, a young woman who earns money working with her voice, leaving phone messages. At one point, she tries to leave this bizarre trade, but it is extremely difficult for her. With Klych López, she played the character Mónica Yamhure in the docufilm Correr o Morir. She was also in the film Cuando Rompen Las Olas by director Riccardo Gabrielli, and starred in the film El Caso Watson by Jaime Escallón.

== Roles ==
=== Television ===
Year	Title	Role	Channel
2024	Klass 95	Gisella Sepúlveda	Caracol Televisión
2022	A grito herido	Camila	Prime Vídeo
2019-2022	El Inquisidor	Aura Bardot	Señal Colombia
2017-2018	La hija pródiga	Beatriz Castellanos / Delia Castellanos	Azteca Uno
2017	¡Ay Güey!	Kiki de los Monteros	Blim
2017	Guerra de ídolos	Bárbara Montoya	Telemundo
2016	Drunk History: El lado borroso de la historia	Wife Llorente	Comedy Central
2016	Mujeres asesinas	Carmen, the daughter	RCN Televisión
2016	La viuda negra 2	Denisse	UniMás
2012-2013	El Capo 2	Pilar Monroy 'La Perrys'	Canal RCN
2012	La Mariposa	Alicia Benítez 'La Mariposa'	Canal RCN
2011	Mentes en shock	Clara	Star Channel
2009-2010	El capo	Pilar Monroy 'La Perrys'	Canal RCN
2008	Sin retorno	Manuela, Ep: Humo	Canal RCN
2008	Tiempo final	Viviana, Ep: Lesbianas	Star Premium
2007-2008	Montecristo	Victoria Sáenz	Caracol Televisión
2006-2007	Las profesionales, a su servicio	Kassandra García	Caracol Televisión
2006	Sin tetas no hay paraíso	Catalina Santana	Caracol Televisión
2004-2005	La mujer en el espejo	Altamira	Telemundo
2004-2005	El vuelo de la cometa	Victoria Durán	Caracol Televisión
2004-2005	Todos quieren con Marilyn	Lina	Canal RCN
2001-2002	Ecomoda	Andrea	Canal RCN
2001	Francisco, el Matemático	Aurora	Canal RCN

=== Programs ===
Year	Title	Role
2008	Proyecto 48	Host
2005	La Guerra de los Sexos	Participant
2004	One night Costa Rica	Host

=== Film ===
Year	Title	Role
2017	El Caso Watson	Lieutenant Mariana Prieto
2008	Correr o morir	
2007	Collar de perlas	María
2006	Cuando rompen las olas	Sofía (young)
2005	El colombian dream	La súper Nena
2001	Sudadera Doble Faz	
2000	Posesión extraterrestre	

=== Theater ===
Year	Title	Director	Notes
2012	Habitación 3.3.3		Casa Esamble
2010	Cuatros secretos		Performance
2007	The Little Prince	Heidi and Rolf Abderhalden	
2004	Historia de amor by Jean Luc Lagarce	Heidi Abderhalden	
2002	Muelle Oeste by Bernard-Marie Koltès	Rolf Abderhalden	Ibero-American Theater Festival of Bogotá
2001	The Imaginary Invalid	Tito Ochoa	
2000	Marat-Sade	Charlotte Corday	Teatro Libre
2000	Bernarda Alba	María Josefa	Teatro Libre

== Awards and nominations ==
=== TVyNovelas Awards ===
Year	Category	Telenovela/Series	Results
2013	Best Leading Actress in a Series	La Mariposa	Nominated
2013	Best Antagonistic Actress in a Telenovela	El Capo 2	Nominated
2010	Best Antagonistic Actress in a Telenovela	El Capo	Won
2007	Best Leading Actress in a Telenovela	Sin tetas no hay paraíso	Nominated

=== India Catalina Awards ===
Year	Category	Telenovela/Series	Results
2013	Best Leading Actress in a Series or Miniseries	La Mariposa	Nominated
2010	Best Antagonistic Actress in a Telenovela, Series or Miniseries	El Capo	Won
2007	Best New Actor or Actress of the Year	Sin tetas no hay paraíso	Won
