= Sin tetas no hay paraíso (Spanish TV series) =

Spanish television series

- Genre: Drama
- Created by: Miguel Sáez Carral
- Based on: Sin tetas no hay paraíso by Gustavo Bolívar
- Directed by: Alfonso Arandia
- Country of origin: Spain
- Original language: Spanish
- No. of seasons: 3
- No. of episodes: 43

Production
- Production company: Grundy Televisión

Original release
- Network: Telecinco
- Release: 9 January 2008 – 20 December 2009

Related
- Sin senos no hay paraíso

Sin tetas no hay paraíso is a Spanish drama television series produced by Grundy Televisión for Telecinco. It is an adaptation of the original homonymous format of Caracol Televisión. The series premiered on 9 January 2008, and ended on 20 December 2009 with a total of 3 seasons and forty-three episodes. After the end of the third season Telecinco announced a fourth season, but it was not produced. It stars Amaia Salamanca as the titular character. The series revolves around a love story of an innocent young woman, self-conscious about her little chest, and an attractive drug trafficker.

The first two seasons starred Amaia Salamanca and Miguel Ángel Silvestre. The latter only lasted two seasons in the series, since his character died at the end of the second season. On 8 January 2009, Telecinco broadcast the finale of the second season in which Silvestre's character was killed. The episode was watched by a total of 5.31 million viewers. The next day the channel broadcast another alternative ending where the protagonists lived a happy life and away from all the problems. The series was nominated for the TP de Oro Awards for Best National Series.

== Cast ==
- Amaia Salamanca as Catalina Marcos Ruiz
- Thaïs Blume as Cristina Calleja
- María Castro as Jessica del Río
- Xenia Tostado as Vanessa Suárez
- Luis Zahera as El Pertur
- Álex García as José Moreno (seasons 2–3)
- Miguel Ángel Silvestre as Rafael Duque (seasons 1–2)
- Fernando Guillén Cuervo as Tomás Castillo (seasons 1–2)
- Armando del Río as Diego Torres (seasons 1–2)
- Manolo Caro as Ramón Amaya (seasons 1–2)
- Álex Barahona as Alberto (seasons 1–2)
- Cuca Escribano as Fina Ruiz (seasons 1–2)
- Mario Bolaños as John Jairo Morón (seasons 1–2)
- Manolo Cardona as Martín (season 3)
- Juan Alfonso Baptista as Guillermo Mejía (season 3)

== Differences from the Colombian version ==
The series has contributions to adapt history to the social reality of Spain.

- The Colombian version stays closer to the book authored by Gustavo Bolívar.
- The shanty-town environment is changed to a working-class neighborhood common in Madrid.
- The motivations of the protagonist of the Spanish version is love, while in the Colombian series it was ambition.
- Catalina's friends are cold and cunning in the Colombian version whereas in the Spanish version they are candid and naïf; similarly, Catalina's mother is driven by ambition in the Colombian version whereas she comes up as selfless and pretty much an archetype of perfect mother in the Spanish version.
