= Without Breasts There Is No Paradise =

Planned American television series

- Created by: Gustavo Bolivar
- Based on: Sin tetas no hay paraíso by Gustavo Bolívar
- Country of origin: United States
- Original language: English

Production
- Executive producer: Gary Scott Thompson
- Production companies: Reveille Productions; Universal Media Studios

Related
- Sin senos no hay paraíso; Sin tetas no hay paraíso

Without Breasts There Is No Paradise was the working title of an NBC drama series produced by Universal Media Studios which was to be adapted from a 2006 Colombian telenovela called Sin tetas no hay paraíso. However, with the departure of NBC Entertainment chairman Ben Silverman in 2009, it never came to air or even went beyond having a pilot filmed. However NBC did produce a Spanish language remake called Sin senos no hay paraíso for its Hispanic-American audience.

== Background ==
The show was set to revolve around the adventures of a young prostitute, who seeks massive breast implants to attract a rich cocaine smuggler. The Colombian version's final episode scored a record 63 share of the country's viewers. The story originated with investigative journalist Gustavo Bolivar's eponymous debut novel about child prostitution.

In April 2008, Ben Silverman, co-chairman of NBC, said that "We're continuing to develop it," but he hinted that an English-language version may not be produced. "It's very likely, actually, to go on Telemundo," he said. "Our script wasn't quite ready." NBC has said little about this project since it first announced in mid-2007 and no pilot has been produced. The network announced in June that the series remained in development for the 2009–2010 season – or beyond. However, with Silverman's departure from the network in June 2009 and the network completely distancing itself from most of the pilots brought in by SIlverman which never made it to series, the project is likely dead and unlikely to be revived by NBC.

== Story ==
Without Breasts There Is No Paradise tells the story of 17-year-old Catalina, a gorgeous young girl who descends into a decadent world of easy money as a teen prostitute "pre-paid girl". She lives in a poor neighborhood with her single mother, Doña Hilda and brother, Bayron, who is a "hitman" and gets paid for killing people on a motorcycle. Catalina dreams of a life of luxury, just like her friends, Paola, Ximena and Vanessa. Yessica is her best friend and a ring leader in charge of the prostitution business of the group and stays in touch with the drug traffickers for when they want girls to stay with them for the weekend. Although all the drug traffickers admire Catalina's beauty, her breasts are not big enough to attract a wealthy pusher whom she can seduce into making her a pampered paramour. She sells her body to a drug lord, Cardona, in order to raise money for her breast augmentation.

Sick of poverty, Catalina decides that getting breast implants is her only ticket into a better life. As Catalina chases her dreams, her boyfriend Albeiro gets tired of waiting for her, never really knowing where she might be or whom she may be with and where she gets so much money from. He eventually develops an intimate relationship with Catalina's mother, Doña Hilda. Later on, while on regular hitman duties, Bayron is caught and killed by the police. During Catalina's pursuit to "paradise", she is raped, gets an abortion, receives a bad surgery and gets a terrible allergic reaction from it and dives into the sex trade. Catalina eventually gets everything she ever dreamed and wanted when she marries drug trafficker Marcial, who falls in love with her instantly. Yessica soon becomes envious of everything that Catalina has and betrays her, by recording Catalina discussing her true feelings about her much older husband, then showing it to Marcial, leaving Catalina on the street and poor again. Catalina loses the will to live and tries to commit suicide but is not able to, so she seeks help from Marcial's bodyguard, Pelambré, who is secretly in love with her. Catalina persuades Pelambré to hire hitmen to kill Yessica. Instead she arranges for them to kill her, while making them think she is Yessica. As she falls to the ground dead, she had written in a book, "It's a lie, without breasts there is no paradise."

== Origins ==
Gustavo Bolivar's heroine is a "pre-paid girl", which means she sells her services around-the-clock for a set period, hoping to make extra money. The screenwriter says Paraiso highlights an unflattering part of his country: teenagers in the Colombian narco-culture getting the breast implants.

Bolívar says the story is based on real-life conditions facing child prostitutes in the town of Pereira. There he met two girls who were desperate for silicone breasts. One told him that she got her operation for free in exchange for sex. Unfortunately, the doctor used a pair of used implants, which led to allergic reactions and infection.

== Development ==
This was the first television show Ben Silverman bought after being named co-chairman of NBC Entertainment. He named Gary Scott Thompson, creator of Las Vegas, as executive producer. NBC would air the program in a style structured like that of the adapted Ugly Betty, which was also produced under Silverman's Reveille Productions.

This show's unique name attracted media attention. A New York magazine writer called it an "almost unbelievably perfect title" and remarked that "TV nirvana has just been achieved." A New York Post headline referred to a "full-frontal soap". The Charlotte Observer remarked that NBC put its "'breast' foot forward." A Dallas Morning News editorial said NBC will be "without a shred of integrity" if this show ever airs.

NBCUniversal experimented with English telenovelas in the past. In early 2006, it commissioned an English version of El Cuerpo del Deseo (Body of Desire), which was a hit on sister network Telemundo. That same year, it signed a deal with a two-year contract with the Los Angeles production company Galán Entertainment to adapt Deseo and other Spanish serials for use on NBC, Bravo and USA Network. However, with the disastrous launch of the competing new network MyNetworkTV using a telenovela model in the fall of 2006, these projects never came to even the pilot stage on NBC or NBC's cable networks.

== Spanish version ==
NBC Universal commissioned both English and Spanish versions of the Colombian serial to be produced independently. Telemundo developed the Spanish version using a different cast and script, and this was the only version of the series to air in the United States.
