= Cielo Rusinque =

Colombian politician (born 1978)

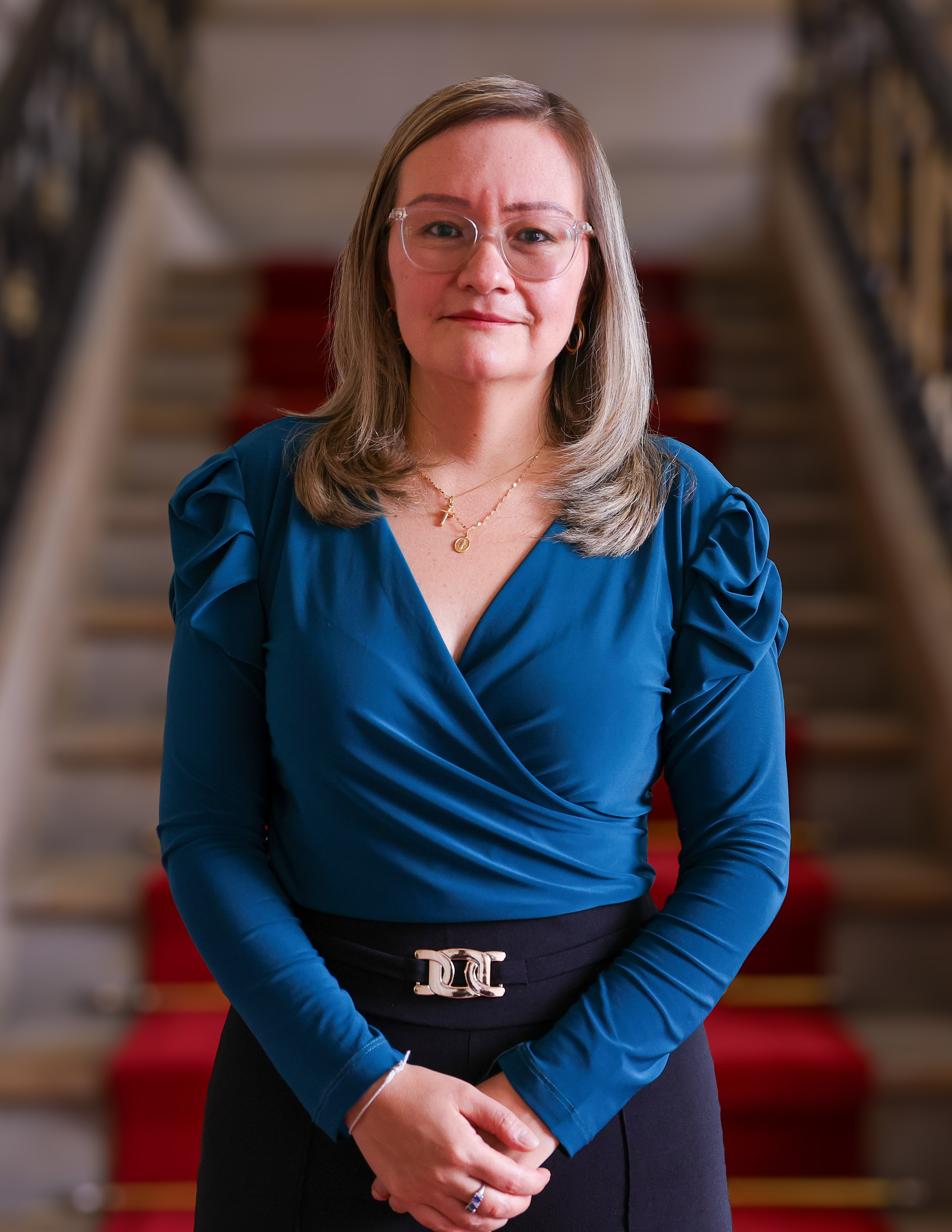
- Official portrait, 2023

Superintendent of Industry and Commerce
- In office 2 February 2024 – 7 August 2026
- President: Gustavo Petro
- Preceded by: María del Socorro Pimienta
- Succeeded by: Iván Cancino González

General Director of Social Prosperity
- In office 14 September 2022 – 31 August 2023
- President: Gustavo Petro
- Preceded by: Pierre García
- Succeeded by: Laura Sarabia

Personal details
- Born: Cielo Elainne Rusinque Urrego; 9 April 1978 (age 48) Bogotá, D.C., Colombia
- Party: Historic Pact (2025-present)
- Other political affiliations: Humane Colombia (2012-2025); Historic Pact for Colombia (2021-2025)

Cielo Elainne Rusinque Urrego (born 9 April 1978) is a Colombian lawyer, reserve police officer, and politician who served as General Director of Social Prosperity from 2022 to 2023 and as Superintendent of Industry and Commerce since 2024.

Born in Bogotá, D.C., Rusinque graduated in law from the Externado University of Colombia. She later specialized in political studies at the University of Paris and subsequently earned a master's degree from the Panthéon-Assas University.

Political offices
| Preceded by Pierre García | General Director of Social Prosperity; 2022-2023 | Succeeded by Laura Sarabia |
| Preceded by María del Socorro Pimienta | Superintendent of Industry and Commerce; 2024-2026 | Succeeded by Iván Cancino González |
Order of precedence
| Preceded by Entities of Ministries and Administrative Departments | Order of precedence of Colombia as Superintendent of Industry and Commerce since 2 February 2024 | Succeeded by Presidential Program Directors |
