= Sandra Beltrán =

Sandra Beltrán may refer to:

- Sandra Ávila Beltrán (born 1960), Mexican drug cartel leader
- Sandra Beltrán (actress) (born 1975), Colombian actress
