= 2018 Colombian presidential election =

- 27 May 2018 (first round); 17 June 2018 (second round)
- Turnout: 53.40% (first round) ▲13.30pp 53.11% (second round) ▲5.14pp
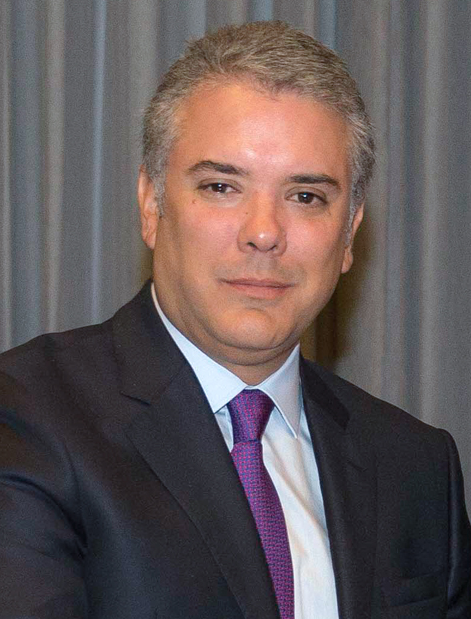

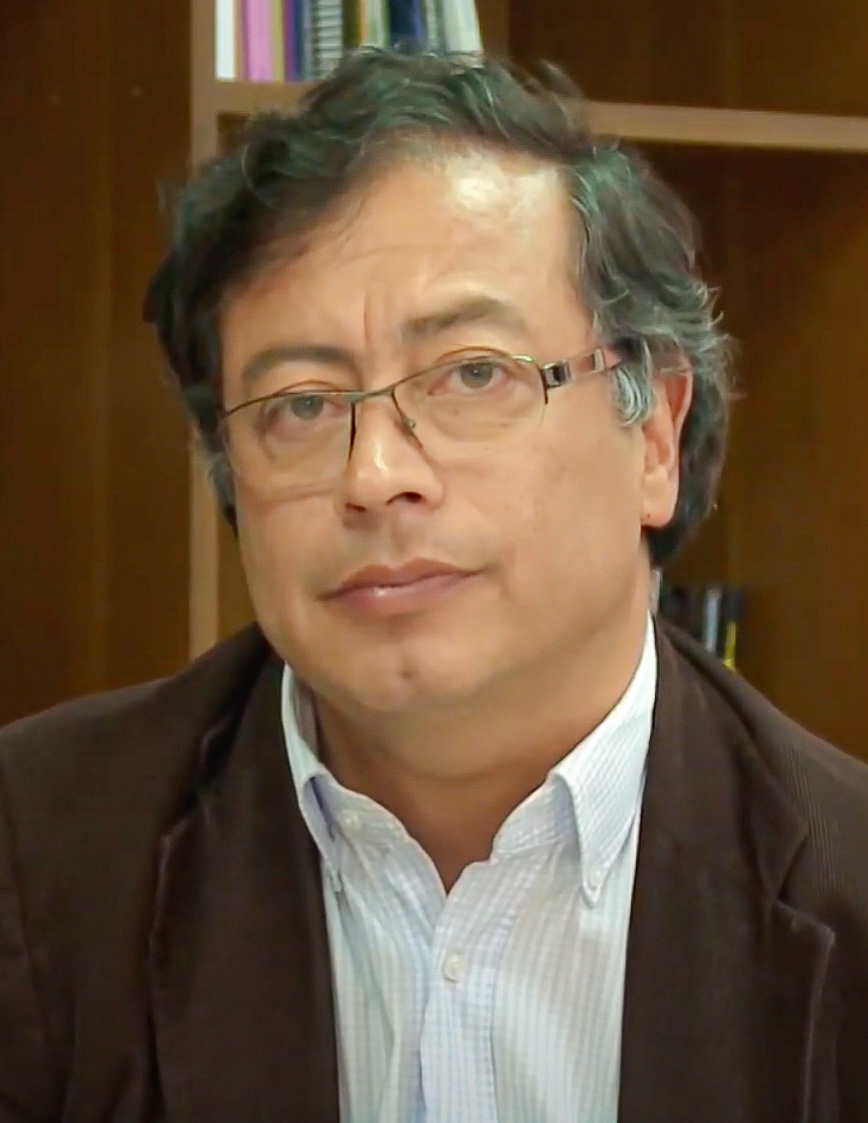
Nominee	Iván Duque	Gustavo Petro
Party	Democratic Centre	Humane Colombia
Alliance	Great Alliance for Colombia	Social Inclusion for Peace
Running mate	Marta Lucía Ramírez	Ángela Robledo
Popular vote	10,398,689	8,040,449
Percentage	54.03%	41.77%
President before election
Juan Manuel Santos
Party of the U
Elected President
Iván Duque
Democratic Centre

Presidential elections were held in Colombia on 27 May 2018. As no candidate received a majority of the vote, the second round of voting was held on 17 June. Incumbent president Juan Manuel Santos was ineligible to seek a third term. Iván Duque, a senator, defeated Gustavo Petro, former mayor of Bogotá, in the second round. Duque's victory made him one of the youngest individuals elected to the presidency, aged 42. His running mate, Marta Lucía Ramírez, was the first woman elected to the vice presidency in Colombian history.

The election was held following a peace agreement between the government and the Revolutionary Armed Forces of Colombia (FARC) in 2016, ending over 50 years of conflict. The elections were the first to occur since congress passed legislation in 2015 modifying the presidential term limits, restricting presidents to one four-year term with a formal ban on re-election. The bill also granted the runner-up candidate in a presidential election a seat in the senate, whilst their running mate would become a member of the chamber of representatives.

Duque, a lawyer and protege of former president Álvaro Uribe, was the nominee for the Democratic Center party. Duque, who was mostly unknown to the public before the election, had a platform encompassing support for innovation, economic recovery and staunch opposition to the peace agreement.

Petro, a former AD/M-19 member and nominee for the Humane Colombia party, ran a progressive populist campaign that focused on reducing inequality and implementing universal healthcare and environmental protection. Petro narrowly surpassed centrist candidate Sergio Fajardo in the first round by just over 1%, permitting him to qualify for the run-off.

Duque was victorious in the second round, earning 54% of the vote to Petro's 41%. Duque won 24 of Colombia's 32 departments, performed well in the inland regions and received over 77% of the vote in the Andean department of Norte de Santander. Duque assumed office on 7 August. Meanwhile, Petro became a senator, and later the future president of Colombia, whilst his running mate, Ángela Robledo, became a member of the chamber of representatives.

== Background ==
During the previous election held in 2014, a second round was held as no candidate attained more than 50% of the vote. The candidates were incumbent president Juan Manuel Santos of the Party of the U and Óscar Iván Zuluaga of the Democratic Center. The election centred on the issue of how to continue peace negotiations with the Revolutionary Armed Forces of Colombia (FARC). In the run-off, Santos defeated Zuluaga, earning 50% of the vote to his opponent's 44%.

In June 2015, both houses of congress approved legislation limiting presidents to a single four-year term with a formal ban on re-election, restoring the term limits that were in place before 2005. President Santos, who submitted the bill upon re-election in the 2014 presidential election, said the re-election ban would restore a balance of power in Colombia. The bill faced criticism from supporters and members of the Democratic Center party led by former president and rival of Santos, Álvaro Uribe. They argued the purpose of the bill's introduction was to prevent Uribe from seeking a non-consecutive third term to the presidency. Edward Rodríguez, a Democratic Center member of congress, described the re-election ban as "revenge against Uribe".

On 27 September 2016, the government signed a peace agreement with the FARC. A referendum took place on 12 October to ratify the deal; however, voters narrowly rejected it. President Santos then negotiated with staunch opponents of the agreement like Uribe and reentered into talks with the FARC. The FARC and the Colombian government agreed to a revised peace deal on 24 November. The modified agreement included changes, such as an agreement that the deal would not be part of the constitution. Rather than put the revised deal through another referendum for ratification, Santos sent the agreement to congress. The Senate voted to ratify the deal on 29 November, which was followed by the approval by the chamber of representatives. The ratification marked an end to 50 years of conflict.

== Electoral system ==
Colombian Presidents are elected for four-year terms using a two-round system; if no candidate receives a majority of the vote in the first round, a runoff is held between the top two candidates. The Vice President is elected on the same ticket as the President. Presidents are limited to a single four-year term and Article 191 of the constitution requires candidates to be Colombian by birth and at least thirty years old.

In line with the constitution, Colombian citizens by birth or by naturalization, aged eighteen or older have the right to vote. Several scenarios can cause the loss of the right to vote, as outlined in the constitution. Citizens in detention centers can vote from the establishments determined by the National Civil Registry. The civil registry inscription is not automatic, and citizens must go to the regional office of the Registry to register.

Legislative act # 2 of 2015 established that the runner-up in the presidential elections is given a seat in the Senate and their Vice President candidate will become a member of the House of Representatives.

== Candidates ==
The following lists display candidates in the order they appeared on the ballot and show the most recent political office they have held as of the time of the election.

=== Candidates in the runoff ===
Party	Presidential nominee	Vice-Presidential nominee	Coalition
Humane Colombia	Gustavo Petro Mayor of Bogotá (2012–2014; 2014–2015)	Ángela Robledo Member of the Chamber of Representatives for Bogotá (2010–2018)	Social Inclusion for Peace
Democratic Center	Iván Duque Senator (2014–2018)	Marta Lucía Ramírez Senator (2006–2009)	Great Alliance for Colombia

=== Candidates not in the runoff ===
Party	Presidential nominee	Vice Presidential nominee (Note: Same party as the presidential nominee, unless mentioned in parentheses)	Coalition
Colombian Liberal Party	Humberto De la Calle Ambassador to the OAS (2001–2003)	Clara López (ASI) Minister of Labour (2016–2017)	PLC–ASI
We Are All Colombia	Jorge Trujillo Senator (2009–2010)	Fredy Obando	—N/a
Citizens' Compromise	Sergio Fajardo Governor of Antioquia (2012–2015)	Claudia López (GA) Senator (2014–2018)	Colombia Coalition
Independent	Germán Vargas Lleras (Note: Member of Radical Change, ran as an independent) Vice President of Colombia (2014–2017)	Juan Carlos Pinzón (CR) Ambassador to the United States (2015–2017)	Mejor Vargas Lleras

=== Electoral Alliances ===
Party/alliance	Presidential candidate	Vice Presidential candidate
Colombia Coalition: Civic Compromise; Alternative Democratic Pole; Green Alliance	Sergio Fajardo	Claudia López Hernández
United Liberalism: Colombian Liberal Party; Independent Social Alliance	Humberto de La Calle	Clara López
List of Decency: Alternative Indigenous and Social Movement; Human Colombia Movement; Patriotic Union; Fuerza Ciudadana (Colombia); Colombian Communist Party	Gustavo Petro	Ángela María Robledo
Grand Alliance for Colombia: Democratic Center; For an Honest and Strong Colombia; La Patria de Pie Movement; Partido Somos Región Colombia; Free and Fair Colombia; MIRA Party	Iván Duque Márquez	Marta Lucía Ramírez
Mejor Vargas Lleras: Mejor Vargas Lleras Movement; Ante Todo Colombia Movement; Radical Change; Social Party of National Unity; Colombian Conservative Party; Citizen Option	Germán Vargas Lleras	Juan Carlos Pinzón
We Are All Colombia	Jorge Antonio Trujillo	Fredy Obando Pinillo

=== Candidates that withdrew ===
The Common Alternative Revolutionary Force withdrew its presidential aspiration on 9 March 2018, stating the health problems of its candidate Rodrigo Londoño, as the reason.

Juan Carlos Pinzón, who had previously served as defence minister and ambassador to the United States under president Juan Manuel Santos, launched his candidacy for Casa de Nariño in 2017. Pinzón withdrew from the race on 16 March 2018 to become Vargas Lleras' running mate.

Piedad Córdoba and her vice presidential candidate Jaime Araújo Rentería terminated their candidacy on 9 April 2018.

Viviane Morales and her vice presidential candidate Jorge Leyva Durán, of the Somos Región Colombia party, retired their candidacy on 2 May 2018. After, Morales adhered to Iván Duque's campaign, while Leyva joined Germán Vargas Lleras' candidacy.

== Primaries ==
Two coalitions, the right-wing Great Alliance for Colombia and left-wing Social Inclusion for Peace, held primary elections concurrently with the legislative elections on 11 March.

=== Great Alliance for Colombia ===
Three candidates sought the nomination of the conservative Great Alliance for Colombia:

- Iván Duque of the Democratic Center, a young lawyer who had served in the senate since 2014.
- Marta Lucía Ramírez, formerly a Conservative party member, sought the nomination as an independent. Ramírez served as defence minister to Álvaro Uribe from 2002 to 2003 and was the first woman to hold that position. She had most recently served as a senator.
- Alejandro Ordóñez, a former inspector-general who competed as a member of the La Patria de Pie party.

==== Results ====
Party	Candidate	Votes	%
Democratic Center	Iván Duque	4,044,509	67.76%
Independent	Marta Lucía Ramírez	1,538,882	25.78%
La Patria de Pie	Alejandro Ordóñez	385,110	6.45%
Source: Semana

Duque won the nomination, and following his victory, he selected the runner-up, Ramírez, to be the alliance's vice presidential nominee.

=== Social Inclusion for Peace ===
The progressive Social Inclusion for Peace alliance was composed of Humane Colombia, the Indigenous and Social Alternative Movement, Patriotic Union and the List of Decency coalition. Two candidates sought the alliance's nomination:

- Gustavo Petro of Humane Colombia was also endorsed by the Indigenous and Social Alternative Movement (MAIS). He had most recently served as mayor of Bogotá.
- Carlos Caicedo, a member of the Citizen Force party and former mayor of Santa Marta, advocated for the government to engage in peace talks with the ELN.

==== Results ====
Party	Candidate	Votes	%
Humane Colombia	Gustavo Petro	2,853,731	84.67%
Indigenous and Social; Alternative Movement	Gustavo Petro	2,853,731	84.67%
Citizen Force	Carlos Caceido	515,309	15.32%
Source: Semana

Petro secured the nomination by a large margin and won all departments, losing only in Caceido's home department of Magdalena. Following the primary election, Petro selected Ángela Robledo of the Green Alliance and a member of the chamber of representatives as his running mate.

== Campaign ==
According to polling data, significant issues amongst voters were unemployment, healthcare, corruption and the FARC peace agreement.

Iván Duque, a lawyer, senator, protege of Uribe, and the nominee for the Democratic Center party, campaigned on promoting innovation, job creation, economic recovery, environmental preservation and opposing the FARC peace agreement. Before his nomination, most of the public was not familiar with Duque. He rose to prominence during the 2016 peace referendum due to his staunch opposition. However, he stated that Duque was still in favour of peace but aimed to keep the FARC out of Colombian politics and prosecute FARC and National Liberation Army (ELN) rebels. On narcotics, Duque expressed his support for the war on drugs and sought to eliminate all coca production. He emphasised a message of opposing corruption and implementing economic reform; for instance; he proposed a simplification of the tax code. Due to Duque's youth and light experience, opponents and critics painted him as unprepared to head the executive branch, leading some to claim further that the senator was a puppet of Uribe. Duque countered these claims by saying it was time for a new generation to take over, and whilst he did highlight his close ties to Uribe, he emphasised that he was "his own man". Critics also attacked Duque for his opposition to the peace agreement, his refusal to rule out fracking and alleged ties to paramilitary groups.

Economist Gustavo Petro of Humane Colombia, a former mayor of Bogotá and former M-19 guerilla who was previously a candidate in the 2010 presidential election, ran a populist campaign focusing on decreasing inequality and tackling climate change. Supported by a coalition of left and centre-left parties, Petro also emphasised workers' rights and campaigned to improve labour conditions in both urban and rural areas. He aimed to reduce poverty by implementing land reforms and establishing a "popular bank" that would offer loans to impoverished citizens. Petro supported the introduction of state-funded universal healthcare that would replace the unpopular private-funded system. Furthermore, he sought to restrict the use of fossil fuels and intended to ban any further exploration of mining and fracking in favour of renewable energy sources. Several months before the election, Petro survived an assassination attempt when a bullet pierced through his armoured van. He presented himself as a successor to prominent slain left-wing politicians such as Jorge Eliecer Gaitan and Luis Carlos Galán. Petro furthermore highlighted the need to end political persecution in the country. Petro's opponents claimed that he would "turn Colombia into another Venezuela", citing his prior support for former Venezuelan president Hugo Chávez. Critics said his policy proposals would not attract foreign investment and that his plans to abandon non-renewable energy, which accounted for 2-4% of Colombia's GDP, were not feasible at the time. Opponents also claimed that his policies would result in an economic disaster.

Veteran politician Humberto De la Calle, who served as vice president to Ernesto Samper, was the nominee for the Colombian Liberal Party. De la Calle played a crucial role in negotiating the peace deal with the FARC and campaigned on policies to assist the country post-conflict, including investments in job creation and regions that were heavily affected by the conflict. He entered the presidential race to keep Duque from winning the presidency. De la Calle supported increasing environmental protection and stricter criteria for the issue of mining licenses, both as a means of promoting ecotourism. Due to the high presence of labour inequality and gender-based violence, De la Calle announced his intention to establish a ministry of women to tackle these issues. He furthermore proposed a significant reform of the education sector, seeking to transform the financing and structure and change the ministry of education to the ministry of intelligence. De la Calle's proposals included other policies with broad support amongst the youth, such as modifying the unpopular student loan program and abolishing compulsory military service. Whilst on the campaign trail, De la Calle struggled to gain momentum and often trailed his opponents in the polls. The peace agreement, a controversial topic amongst voters, did not help boost support for De la Calle. His 30 years of political experience proved a double-edged sword; some voters saw this as a benefit, but others concluded that De la Calle was a part of the elite. The Liberal party's severe dis-unity and rupturing also hurt him. But De la Calle's campaign suffered a severe downturn when Liberal party leader and former president César Gaviria announced before the first round that the Liberal party would support Duque in the run-off, implying that the party had lost confidence in De la Calle's candidacy.

Sergio Fajardo, a mathematician, former mayor of Medellín, former governor of Antioquia and previously a vice presidential candidate in the 2010 presidential election, won the nomination of the Colombia Coalition, an alliance composed of the Alternative Democratic Pole, the Green Alliance and his Civic Compromise party. Fajardo's platform encompassed education and the environment. He intended to increase the education budget by 10% and boost enrollment nationwide to combat poverty. Fajardo supported the peace agreement, although he presented himself as a moderate centrist alternative to Duque and Petro. On the campaign trail, Fajardo expressed concern about vote buying and advocated for a transparent electoral and judicial process. Whilst he campaigned on being the fiscally reliable candidate, he faced criticism from opponents who highlighted a dramatic debt increase that occurred during his tenure as governor of Antioquia. Fajardo considered polarisation a threat to Colombian politics and sought to present himself as a middle-ground candidate. However, critics said this strategy risked Fajardo appealing to few voters.

Jorge Antonio Trujillo, a Christian pastor and former senator, was the nominee for the We Are All Colombia party. Trujillo, the founder of the gospel church of Casa de Reino, gained widespread attention in 2014 when he claimed that the winter wave the country experienced was a punishment from God and blamed President Santos, claiming that the president had previously travelled to the Sierra Nevada de Santa Marta mountains where he made a "secret rite" and "handed over the country to the shamans and sorcerers." Whilst campaigning, Trujillo frequently mentioned that his most fundamental priorities were in the following order: God, family, the Church and the nation. An opponent of LGBT rights, Trujillo pledged to prevent LGBT couples from legally adopting children and outlaw same-sex marriage. Trujillo was opposed to the peace agreement, claiming it violated the constitution. Rarely holding public rallies, he instead preached his campaign messages through his church services. Trujillo performed poorly in opinion polls, although the pastor claimed to have faced discrimination from the national electoral council and pollsters. However, Trujillo assured voters he had faith that God would provide an "electoral surprise" in the first round and qualify for the run-off.

Germán Vargas Lleras of the conservative Radical Change party and vice president to Juan Manuel Santos resigned as second-in-command in March 2017 to be eligible to contest the presidency. Vargas Lleras ran as an independent; at a time when various members of his party were under investigation for corruption. Vargas Lleras led in many early polls and with the support of the Mejor Vargas Lleras coalition; the former vice president campaigned on his experience, pledging to continue many policies of the Santos administration, for example, resuming the 4G road network infrastructure that he played a part in initiating. On the economy, the former vice president supported lowering income taxes to attract more foreign investment and promote entrepreneurs, differing from the policy of the Santos administration. Furthermore, Vargas Lleras highlighted the Crisis in Venezuela during the campaign and expressed staunch opposition towards the Nicolás Maduro. On the campaign trail, Vargas Lleras claimed he was the candidate that would prevent Colombia from descending into a crisis like in Venezuela. The former vice president advocated for an end to corruption; however, this was complicated when opponents attacked Vargas Lleras for the corruption investigations surrounding the Radical Change party. Critics said his tax reform proposal would risk increasing inequality throughout Colombia and that the support from president Santos would prove to be a double-edged sword due to the outgoing administration's unpopularity. Furthermore, Vargas Lleras did not fully support the FARC peace agreement.

== Debates ==
There were four debates, which took place in the four main departments.

The Antioquia debate was characterised by the lack of attacks made by the candidates. Topics included public order, Venezuelan immigration, the peace treaties with FARC and LGBT couples' rights. Regional topics included the Antioquia railroad, regional connectivity and tourist industry development.

The Caribe debate saw several disqualifications and confrontations between candidates, as well as incidents in the crowds between followers of different parties. Topics included the battle against corruption, the peace process with FARC, the environment and the country's relationship with Venezuelan. Regional topics included Electricaribe (an energy supplier in the Caribe region) and the decisions that the candidates would take to resolve the energy problem.

The Pacific debate saw discussions on flaws in the healthcare system, illegal mining, education, FARC, illegal crops, the battle against corruption, infrastructure, culture, racism and the exploitation of biodiversity. The candidates Humberto de La Calle and Germán Vargas Lleras took advantage of the free questions to comment on absent candidate, Iván Duque.

The Eje Cafetero debate was cancelled due to disturbances that prevented some candidates entering the Los Fundadores de Manizales theatre. Afterwards Iván Duque, Humberto de La Calle, Gustavo Petro and Germán Vargas Lleras met at the city's auditorium and held a closed-door debate. The most important topics were the coffee industry and tourism.

== Opinion polls ==
=== First round ===
==== 2017 ====
During the first round, six parties ran for the presidency. These candidates were; Iván Duque, Gustavo Petro, Sergio Fajardo, Germán Vargas Lleras, Humberto De la Calle and Jorge Antonio Trujillo. As none of the candidates received the majority of votes, the elections moved to a runoff between the top two candidates, Iván Duque and Gustavo Petro, which was held on 17 June 2018.

Pollster	Date(s) conducted	Sample size	Candidate																			Margin of error
Pollster	Date(s) conducted	Sample size	Ordóñez	Navarro	Claudia López	Clara López	Santos	Vargas	Petro	De La Calle	Duque	Robledo	Galán	Pinzon	Ramos	Ramirez	Cordoba	Fajardo	Others	Blank vote	Don't know/No response	Margin of error
Invamer	2017-05-22	1200	4.9%	-	6.0%	8.4%	-	21.5%	14.2%	5.4%	-	4.0%	-	2.4%	7.7%	6.5%	2.8%	11.0%	-	6.3%	-	3.6%
Datexco	2017-05-26	900	1.1%	-	3.6%	5.9%	1.1%	16.5%	7.6%	1.5%	0.9%	2.4%	4.1%	1.2%	1.6%	2.6%	1.9%	12.1%	4.2%	-	31.3%	3.27%
EcoAnalitica	2017-07-17	1285	-	-	15.8%	-	-	15.1%	14.2%	3.1%	17.4%	7.2%	-	0.9%	-	2.5%	-	8.8%	-	8.2%	6.8%	3%
Cifras y Conceptos	2017-08-03	1800	6%	1%	10%	7%	-	13%	13%	3%	2%	4%	5%	2%	1%	1%	-	8%	6%	-	17%	5%
Datexco	2017-08-02	900	0.6%	2.2%	4.9%	6.7%	2.1%	5.3%	14.3%	2.5%	0.4%	2.9%	4.9%	2.2%	1.1%	2.5%	1.8%	10.3%	4.1%	-	31.4%	3.27%
Datexco	2017-09-07	900	2.1%	1.9%	5.3%	8.3%	-	6.7%	11.2%	3.4%	1.3%	2.5%	5.6%	1.7%	1.5%	2.7%	1.3%	9.6%	5%	-	29.9	3.27%
EcoAnalitica	2017-09-08	1657	2.0%	1.8%	9.0%	3.3%	-	8.3%	10.1%	3.9%	7.8%	3.7%	2.2%	1.6%	2.5%	2.1%	0.5%	6.9%	7.4%	20.7%	6.2%	2.6%
YanHass	2017-09-16	1250	3%	3%	6%	3%	2%	11%	9%	2%	1%	2%	4%	1%	1%	2%	2%	7%	4.8%	23%	13%	3.3%
Invamer	2017-09-28	1200	3.1%	-	11.2%	3.2%	-	12.5%	10.4%	8.3%	6.9%	5.3%	8.8%	1.2%	-	4.6%	1.4%	21.0%	-	2.1%	8.2%	3%
Cifras y Conceptos	2017-11-26	1795	2%	-	7%	5%	-	14%	17%	10%	2%	3%	-	1%	-	2%	1%	15%	1%	-	14%	4,5%
Invamer	2017-12-07	1200	1.2%	-	6.9%	2.9%	-	12%	14.3%	9.1%	8.4%	2%	3.6%	0.9%	-	8.7%	2.2%	18.7%	2.1%	6%	14%	9.6%

==== 2018 ====
Polling organisation/client	Date(s) conducted	Sample size	Candidate															Margin of error	Source
Polling organisation/client	Date(s) conducted	Sample size	Alejandro Ordóñez	Clara López	German Vargas Lleras	Gustavo Petro	Humberto de La Calle	Iván Duque Márquez	Juan Carlos Pinzon	Marta Lucia Ramirez	Piedad Cordoba	Sergio Fajardo	Viviane Morales	Rodrigo Londoño	Others	Blank vote	Don't know/No response	Margin of error	Source
Guarumo	2018-02-02	2187	2.5%	3.2%	8.4%	12.5%	6.5%	12.2%	1.7%	5.8%	0.9%	14.6%	-	1.6%	1.6%	6%	16.3%	4%	El Tiempo, W Radio
YanHass	2018-02-02	1251	3%	3%	8%	13%	4%	6%	2%	2%	1%	14%	1%	1%	2%	6%	30%	2.2%	RCN
Invamer	2018-02-02	1200	-	4.2%	15.6%	23.5%	11%	9.2%	3.4%	-	1.7%	20.2%	2.2%	1.6%	-	6.7%	-	3%	Caracol TV, Blu Radio, Semana
Cifras y Conceptos	2018-02-02	2813	3%	4%	10%	16%	5%	8%	1%	5%	1%	19%	-	1%	4%	7%	16%	4.6%	Caracol Radio, Red+ Noticias
Centro Nacional de Consultoría	2018-02-08	1187	1%	-	10%	23%	5%	8%	2%	6%	2%	18%	1%	1%	1%	22%	-	3.6%	Noticiero CM&
Centro Nacional de Consultoría	2018-02-22	1175	2%	-	8%	22%	5%	15%	2%	6%	1%	16%	2%	0%	1%	20%	-	3.8%	Noticiero CM&
Centro Estratégico Latinoamericano de Geopolítica	2018-02-28	1200	-	5.6%	13.5%	19%	7.3%	6.2%	-	8.4%	5%	24%	-	-	3.5%	7.5%	-	1% - 2.8%	-
Cifras y Conceptos	2018-03-01	2960	3%	-	8%	22%	4%	22%	1%	6%	1%	11%	2%	1%	1%	2%	6%	4.5%	Caracol Radio, Red+ Noticias
Guarumo	2018-03-04	3425	1.5%	-	6.3%	23.1%	4.1%	23.6%	1%	5.7%	0.3%	8.1%	0.8%	0.3%	1.5%	13.2%	10.5%	2.7%	El Tiempo, W Radio
Centro Nacional de Consultoría	2018-03-08	1192	3%	-	7%	21%	4%	38%	1%	11%	1%	12%	2%	1%	1%	18%	-	3.6%	Noticiero CM&
Invamer	2018-03-27	1200	-	-	6.3%	26.7%	5%	45.9%	-	-	-	10.7%	2.5%	-	-	-	-	-	portafolio.co
Invamer	2018-04-27	1200	-	-	7.9%	31%	2.5%	41.3%	-	-	-	13.3%	2%	-	0.1%	1.9%	46.5%	3%	Semana

=== Second round ===
Former candidate of Sergio Fajardo, leader of Movimiento Compromiso Ciudadano, announced his blank vote for the second round, as well as former liberal candidate Humberto de La Calle, although his party joined Iván Duque's campaign. The Alternative Democratic Pole joined Gustavo Petro's campaign, but a minority sector led by Senator Jorge Robledo (MOIR) decided to vote blank too. The directive of the Green Alliance let their followers to choose between supporting Gustavo Petro or voting blank, but considered unacceptable to support Iván Duque. Movimiento Mejor Vargas Lleras and the Radical Change party sent their former candidate's program to Iván Duque, to consider it for a future government, although there was not an official adhesion. The Partido de la U and the Social Party of National Unity encouraged their followers choose freely to vote for their preferred option.

Polling organisation/client	Date(s) conducted	Sample size	Candidate				Margin of error	Source
Polling organisation/client	Date(s) conducted	Sample size	Gustavo Petro	Iván Duque Márquez	Blank vote	Don't know/No response	Margin of error	Source
Centro Nacional de Consultoría	2018-05-31	1323	35%	55%	10%	-	3.05%	Noticiero CM&
YanHaas	2018-06-05	1251	34%	52%	14%	-	3.2%	RCN, La FM, El Colombiano
Mosqueteros	2018-06-07	2147	38.3%	50.2%	11.5%	-	2.17%	JPG, MSM, Yamil Cure Ruíz
Invamer	2018-06-07	1200	37.3%	57.2%	5.5%	-	2.83%	Caracol TV, Blu Radio, Semana
Datexco	2018-06-08	1993	40.2%	46.2%	13.6%	-	2.31%	W Radio
Cifras & Conceptos	2018-06-08	1983	36.4%	45.3%	18.3%	-	4.8%	Caracol Radio, RED+ Noticias
Centro Nacional de Consultoría	2018-06-09	1591	38%	51%	11%	-	2.8%	Noticiero CM&
Guarumo	2018-06-10	3955	36%	52.5%	11.5%	-	2.1%	El Tiempo, W Radio
CELAG /	2018-06-11	2063	40%	45.5%	7.7%	6.8%	2.2%	

== Results ==
Turnout in the first round was 53.40%. Iván Duque won a plurality of votes in the first round, securing 39.36% of the vote. Because he failed to attain the 50% required to win an outright victory, Duque, along with the second-place candidate Gustavo Petro who received 25.09%, competed in a second round. Petro narrowly surpassed Sergio Fajardo, denying the Colombia Coalition ticket a spot in the runoff. Blank ballots made up 1.75% of the votes cast.

Duque won a decisive victory in the run-off, earning 54.03%. Duque secured a majority of the vote in 23 departments and received a plurality in La Guajira, while his strongest showing was in Norte de Santander, where he earned 77%. Petro received 41% and won eight departments and Bogotá. He performed well in several coastal departments and received nearly 70% of the vote in the Amazonian department of Putumayo. Blank votes increased to 4.20%, whilst voter turnout was virtually identical to the first round at 53.11%. Duque became one of the youngest individuals elected to the presidency at age 42, whilst Marta Lucía Ramírez was the first woman elected vice president.

Candidate	Running mate	Party	First round		Second round	
Candidate	Running mate	Party	Votes	%	Votes	%
Iván Duque	Marta Lucía Ramírez	Democratic Center	7,616,857	39.36	10,398,689	54.03
Gustavo Petro	Ángela Robledo	Humane Colombia	4,855,069	25.09	8,040,449	41.77
Sergio Fajardo	Claudia López	Citizens' Compromise	4,602,916	23.78		
Germán Vargas Lleras	Juan Carlos Pinzón	Independent	1,412,392	7.30		
Humberto De la Calle	Clara López	Colombian Liberal Party	396,151	2.05		
Jorge Trujillo	Fredy Obando	We Are All Colombia	65,767	0.34		
Viviane Morales Hoyos	Jorge Leyva	Somos Región Colombia	36,138	0.19		
Promotores Voto En Blanco	Promotores Voto En Blanco	Party of Ethnic Reclamation	30,128	0.16		
Blank votes			338,581	1.75	807,924	4.20
Total			19,353,999	100.00	19,247,062	100.00
Valid votes			19,353,999	98.53	19,247,062	98.52
Invalid votes			289,677	1.47	289,342	1.48
Total votes			19,643,676	100.00	19,536,404	100.00
Registered voters/turnout			36,783,940	53.40	36,783,940	53.11
Source: EU Election Experts Mission, CNE

=== By department ===
==== First round ====
Department	Duque		Petro		Fajardo		Vargas		De la Calle		Trujillo		Morales		Blank votes	
Department	Votes	%	Votes	%	Votes	%	Votes	%	Votes	%	Votes	%	Votes	%	Votes	%
Amazonas	7,114	39.02%	5,931	32.53%	2,693	14.77%	1,295	7.10%	739	4.05%	87	0.47%	51	0.27%	299	1.64%
Antioquia	1,367,745	53.10%	238,440	9.25%	731,609	28.40%	99,642	3.86%	59,974	2.32%	7,626	0.29%	5,203	0.20%	65,245	2.53%
Arauca	49,415	56.70%	17,824	20.45%	12,036	13.81%	3,336	3.82%	1,588	1.82%	395	0.45%	229	0.26%	2,317	2.65%
Atlántico	234,045	27.18%	331,687	38.52%	85,634	9.94%	171,968	19.97%	16,728	1.94%	3,872	0.44%	2,244	0.26%	14,829	1.72%
Bogotá	983,931	26.78%	1,098,478	29.90%	1,240,799	33.77%	172,158	4.68%	93,830	2.55%	13,959	0.37%	6,354	0.17%	64,016	1.74%
Bolívar	256,732	40.61%	242,378	38.33%	55,468	8.77%	52,111	8.24%	10,304	1.62%	2,544	0.40%	1,616	0.25%	11,031	1.74%
Boyacá	225,146	40.81%	122,686	22.24%	148,029	26.83%	29,967	5.43%	10,647	1.93%	1,959	0.35%	1,321	0.23%	11,847	2.14%
Caldas	190,557	42.91%	34,694	7.81%	161,420	36.35%	30,784	6.93%	14,322	3.22%	1,449	0.32%	1,215	0.27%	9,587	2.15%
Caquetá	67,884	52.23%	29,965	23.05%	21,157	16.28%	3,497	2.69%	2,675	2.05%	443	0.34%	381	0.29%	3,947	3.03%
Casanare	107,131	60.25%	23,130	13.00%	38,047	21.39%	3,445	1.93%	1,473	0.82%	579	0.32%	371	0.20%	3,615	2.03%
Cauca	107,141	22.84%	230,919	49.24%	60,891	12.98%	42,032	8.96%	13,128	2.79%	2,533	0.54%	1,228	0.26%	11,049	2.35%
Cesar	171,647	43.60%	141,502	35.94%	29,021	7.37%	39,281	9.97%	3,112	0.79%	1,831	0.46%	948	0.24%	6,322	1.60%
Chocó	30,136	26.14%	49,552	42.98%	3,834	3.32%	24,343	21.11%	3,843	3.33%	536	0.46%	504	0.43%	2,526	2.19%
Consulates/Abroad	152,432	54.68%	34,395	12.33%	73,833	26.48%	10,440	3.74%	4,223	1.51%	398	0.14%	400	0.14%	2,614	0.93%
Córdoba	228,190	38.70%	249,303	42.28%	22,396	3.79%	66,728	11.31%	10,448	1.77%	3,186	0.54%	1,387	0.23%	7,906	1.34%
Cundinamarca	475,359	40.13%	236,862	19.99%	328,519	27.73%	85,862	7.24%	20,567	1.73%	5,115	0.43%	2,810	0.23%	29,224	2.46%
Guainía	3,872	40.92%	2,126	22.47%	1,218	12.87%	1,839	19.43%	185	1.95%	45	0.47%	27	0.28%	149	1.57%
Guaviare	11,488	46.13%	5,762	23.13%	3,869	15.53%	1,646	6.60%	927	3.72%	141	0.56%	85	0.34%	984	3.95%
Huila	240,669	53.48%	95,270	21.17%	77,837	17.29%	17,623	3.91%	7,155	1.59%	1,067	0.23%	798	0.17%	9,558	2.12%
La Guajira	76,137	38.51%	85,149	43.07%	10,243	5.18%	18,010	9.11%	3,492	1.76%	889	0.44%	481	0.24%	3,276	1.65%
Magdalena	160,752	38.23%	143,107	34.03%	28,233	6.71%	71,896	17.10%	6,811	1.62%	1,833	0.43%	992	0.23%	6,808	1.61%
Meta	211,322	49.36%	75,945	17.73%	101,987	23.82%	21,473	5.01%	4,737	1.10%	1,832	0.42%	855	0.19%	9,964	2.32%
Nariño	134,455	26.09%	238,683	46.33%	70,707	13.72%	44,709	8.67%	10,455	2.02%	1,376	0.26%	1,333	0.25%	13,446	2.61%
Norte de Santander	377,152	61.00%	56,848	9.19%	102,210	16.53%	63,525	10.27%	6,108	0.98%	2,424	0.39%	1,091	0.17%	8,890	1.43%
Putumayo	23,136	22.81%	60,520	59.68%	9,788	9.65%	1,850	1.82%	2,973	2.93%	253	0.24%	200	0.19%	2,676	2.63%
Quindío	109,072	41.92%	30,357	11.66%	97,741	37.57%	11,861	4.55%	4,335	1.66%	1,010	0.38%	480	0.18%	5,277	2.02%
Risaralda	175,159	40.38%	54,207	12.49%	164,736	37.98%	20,657	4.76%	7,645	1.76%	1,054	0.24%	816	0.18%	9,425	2.17%
San Andrés & Providencia	5,691	44.71%	2,361	18.55%	1,986	15.60%	1,507	11.84%	655	5.14%	150	1.17%	32	0.25%	345	2.71%
Santander	439,664	44.35%	171,806	17.33%	271,849	27.42%	63,762	6.43%	17,250	1.74%	4,180	0.42%	2,059	0.20%	20,676	2.08%
Sucre	129,004	37.00%	154,208	44.23%	12,041	3.45%	40,761	11.69%	4,805	1.37%	2,121	0.60%	937	0.26%	4,708	1.35%
Tolima	284,138	49.59%	95,458	16.66%	117,874	20.57%	49,266	8.59%	11,775	2.05%	2,112	0.36%	1,217	0.21%	11,044	1.92%
Valle del Cauca	523,898	29.97%	485,943	27.80%	499,925	28.60%	137,245	7.85%	40,923	2.34%	8,523	0.48%	3,684	0.21%	47,476	2.71%
Vaupés	1,013	15.09%	2,514	37.47%	553	8.24%	1,359	20.25%	1,141	17.00%	24	0.35%	21	0.31%	84	1.25%
Vichada	8,466	53.68%	3,244	20.57%	1,513	9.59%	1,962	12.44%	207	1.31%	68	0.43%	88	0.55%	221	1.40%
Sources: El Tiempo, Registraduría, Adam Carr

==== Second round ====
Candidate with the most votes in the second round by municipality: Iván Duque - Marta Lucía Ramírez Gustavo Petro - Ángela María Robledo

Department	Duque		Petro		Blank votes	
Department	Votes	%	Votes	%	Votes	%
Amazonas	9,962	50.42%	9,324	47.19%	471	2.38%
Antioquia	1,844,027	72.53%	558,514	21.97%	139,598	5.49%
Arauca	59,417	64.94%	28,858	31.54%	3,215	3.51%
Atlántico	342,866	42.82%	440,103	54.96%	17,734	2.21%
Bogotá	1,447,685	40.98%	1,884,869	53.35%	200,079	5.66%
Bolívar	345,415	51.18%	316,670	46.92%	12,725	1.88%
Boyacá	308,733	54.81%	233,755	41.50%	20,688	3.67%
Caldas	283,920	65.67%	121,476	28.09%	26,918	6.18%
Caquetá	79,689	62.17%	43,511	33.94%	4,965	3.87%
Casanare	127,906	72.78%	41,559	23.64%	6,264	3.56%
Cauca	160,191	32.19%	323,443	65.00%	13,937	2.80%
Cesar	216,750	54.24%	174,175	43.58%	8,862	2.17%
Chocó	46,289	39.21%	69,448	58.82%	2,315	1.96%
Consulates/Abroad	180,995	69.91%	69,558	26.86%	8,340	3.22%
Córdoba	310,231	50.16%	298,944	48.34%	9,234	1.49%
Cundinamarca	658,212	56.48%	452,307	38.81%	54,779	4.70%
Guainía	5,873	57.06%	4,097	39.80%	322	3.12%
Guaviare	15,755	58.35%	9,838	36.43%	1,427	5.21%
Huila	296,245	64.71%	146,530	32.01%	14,964	3.26%
La Guajira	106,328	49.89%	103,271	48.45%	3,509	1.64%
Magdalena	226,136	51.83%	201,567	46.20%	8,548	1.95%
Meta	264,513	63.95%	131,819	31.87%	17,247	4.17%
Nariño	192,588	33.53%	366,673	63.85%	14,961	2.60%
Norte de Santander	486,004	77.89%	112,496	18.03%	25,433	4.07%
Putumayo	30,918	27.88%	77,220	69.63%	2,755	2.48%
Quindío	156,973	62.76%	78,071	31.21%	15,067	6.02%
Risaralda	257,267	61.57%	136,646	32.70%	23,913	5.72%
San Andrés & Providencia	9,303	61.20%	5,282	34.75%	614	4.03%
Santander	591,714	60.30%	345,224	35.18%	44,208	4.50%
Sucre	171,322	48.25%	178,934	50.39%	4,797	1.53%
Tolima	379,766	65.89%	174,655	30.30%	21,857	3.79%
Valle del Cauca	746,819	43.66%	885,289	51.76%	78,248	4.57%
Vaupés	3,096	38.75%	4,759	59.56%	134	1.67%
Vichada	10,172	63.94%	5,304	33.34%	431	2.70%
Sources: El Tiempo, Adam Carr
