= Ángela Robledo =

Colombian psychologist and politician

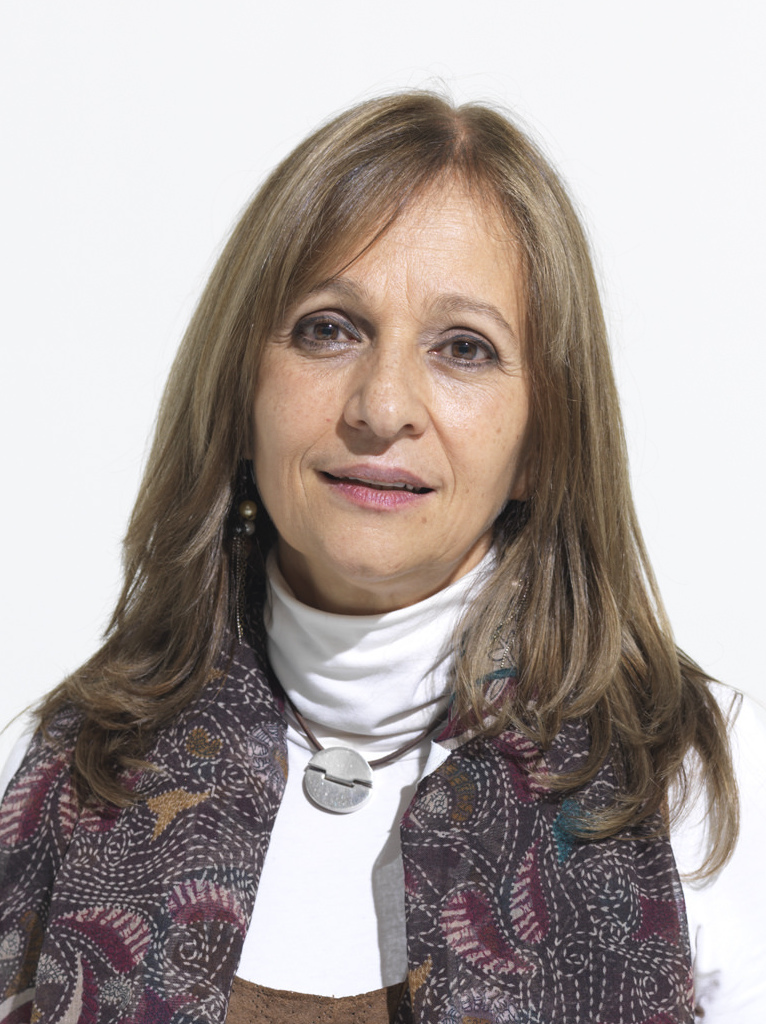

Member of the Chamber of Representatives
- In office 20 July 2018 – 25 April 2019
- Constituency: Capital District
- In office 20 July 2010 – 20 July 2018
- Constituency: Capital District
- In office 13 May 2020 – 20 July 2018
- Constituency: Capital District

Personal details
- Born: Ángela María Robledo Gómez; 7 September 1953 (age 72) Manizales, Caldas, Colombia
- Party: Green Alliance (2010–2018; 2020–present); Humane Colombia (2018–2019)
- Education: Pontifical Xavierian University
- Profession: Politician, psychiatrist, and academic.

Ángela María Robledo Gómez (born 7 September 1953) is a Colombian psychologist and left-wing politician. Currently a member of the Chamber of Representatives, Robledo is a former dean of psychology at Pontifical Xavierian University.

A member of the centre-left Green Alliance from 2010 to 2018, Robledo joined the socialist Colombia Humana party to serve as the vice presidential running mate of Gustavo Petro in 2018. Since then, Robledo has broken with Petro and returned to the Green Alliance. She is considered a likely candidate in the 2022 presidential election. Robledo is known for her feminist politics and work to end gender violence.

== Early life and career ==
Robledo grew up in Manizales, a city in the Caldas Department. Robledo cites her mother as the first person to introduce her to feminism. Robledo has stated that her family were not wealthy, but made enough to pay for her and her siblings' education.

Robledo studied psychology at the Pontifical Xavierian University from 1971 to 1975, and would later return to college to attain a master's degree in social policy from 2004 to 2007. Robledo has served as a professor and researcher at both the Pontifical Xavierian University as well as Del Rosario University. In 2004, she became Academic Dean of the Faculty of Psychology at the Pontifical Xavierian University, and would later serve as president of the Colombian Association of Psychology Faculties.

While completing her studies, Robledo would meet future presidential candidate Antanas Mockus. Robledo would develop a close professional relationship with Mockus, regularly speaking with him about the need to address women's issues. As Mayor of Bogota, Mockus would make Robledo director of the Administrative Department of Social Welfare of the District (DABS), a position she served in from 2001 to 2003. During this time, Robledo advocated for gender equality policies, helping advance the Equal Opportunities Plan for Gender Equality in the Capital District for 2004 to 2016 in cooperation with Bogota City Council member Carlos Baena.

== Member of the Chamber of Representatives ==
In 2010, she ran for the Chamber of Representatives of Colombia as a member of the centre-left Green Alliance with the help of Mockus. She received 158,415 votes and was elected to the body, and in 2014 would be reelected.

Robledo was a member of the Seventh and Integral Commission for Gender Equality. Additionally, she founded the chamber's Peace Commission with Alternative Democratic Pole Senator Iván Cepeda.

In 2014, Robredo would write and advocate for Law 1719 along, a proposal to modify the Penal Code to guarantee access to justice for victims of sexual violence, especially sexual violence during the armed conflict. Robledo is an advocate of abortion rights and participated in a march to end violence against trans women.

Party political offices
New political party	Humane Colombia nominee for Vice President of Colombia; 2018	Succeeded by Francia Márquez
