= El colombian dream =

2006 Colombian comedy film

- Directed by: Felipe Aljure
- Starring: Mateo Rudas; Santiago Rudas
- Release date: 27 October 2006
- Running time: 2h
- Country: Colombia
- Language: Spanish

El colombian dream is a 2006 Colombian comedy film directed by Felipe Aljure. The plot and the many sub-plots revolve around a disco called "El Colombian Dream".
