= Klass 95 =

- Genre: Telenovela
- Created by: Juana Uribe
- Showrunner: Juana Uribe
- Written by: Juana Uribe; Sebastián Sánchez
- Screenplay by: Juana Uribe; Sebastián Sánchez; Laura Rojas; Ricardo Aponte
- Directed by: Andrés Biermann; Rodrigo Triana
- Starring: Nicole Santamaría; David Palacio; Carlos Báez
- Music by: César Escola; Jairo Vargas
- Opening theme: "Klass 95" by Juan Manuel Medina
- Country of origin: Colombia
- Original language: Spanish
- No. of seasons: 1
- No. of episodes: 45

Production
- Executive producers: Amparo Gutiérrez; Dago García
- Editor: Fabián Ignacio Rodríguez
- Production company: Caracol Televisión

Original release
- Network: Caracol Televisión
- Release: 20 August – 25 October 2024

Klass 95 is a Colombian telenovela created by Juana Uribe. It aired on Caracol Televisión from 20 August 2024 to 25 October 2024. The series stars Nicole Santamaría as Shaio Domínguez, a young woman of high society who starts a modeling agency along with her sister and cousin, with the goal of empowering women looking to better their lives. The series also stars David Palacio, Carlos Báez, Diego Trujillo, Laura Cano and Matilde Lemaitre.

== Cast ==
=== Main ===
- Nicole Santamaría as Shaio Domínguez
- David Palacio as Berny Gómez
- Carlos Báez as Nicolás Rocha
- Laura Cano as Laura Domínguez
- Edwin Riveros as Óscar Lourdy
- Matilde Lemaitre as Moni Domínguez
- María Camila Zea
- Laura Barjum as Andrea Vanessa
- Juan David Galindo as Edgar Trejos
- Valeria Gálviz as Kelly Sepúlveda
- Erik Rodríguez
- Diego Trujillo as Joaquín Domínguez
- Juana Arboleda as Nayibe
- Susana Torres as Paulina de Domínguez
- María Adelaida Puerta as Gisella Sepúlveda
- Adriana Arango
- Jacques Toukhmanian de Mera
- Samuel Lizarralde
- Víctor Gómez
- Angélica Blandón
- Manuel Sarmiento as Angelo
- Michelle Orozco
- José Daniel Cristancho

=== Recurring and guest stars ===
- Tommy Vásquez as Hollman
- Marcela Gallego
- Antonio Sanint
- Rafael Zea
- Manuela Valdés as Paola Turbay
- Tania Valencia as Xinia

== Episodes ==
No.	Title	Original release date	Colombia viewers (Rating points)
1	"Shaio se desilusiona con los resultados de Miss Universo"	20 August 2024	8.6
2	"Nico comete su primera jugada sucia contra Berny y su gimnasio"	21 August 2024	8.6
3	"Berny es llevado a la cárcel tras ser víctima del plan de Nico"	22 August 2024	7.6
4	"El amor de Shaio y Berny es víctima de los engaños"	23 August 2024	8.0
5	"Edgar es víctima de una traición, ¿se le acabará el amor?"	26 August 2024	7.4
6	"Tras ser maltratada y humillada Kelly comete un error fatal"	27 August 2024	8.4
7	"En la inauguración de la agencia está la 'crema y nata' de Bogotá"	28 August 2024	7.6
8	"Edgar tiene un grave problema y no podrá viajar a Estados Unidos"	29 August 2024	7.4
9	"Berny conoce a Andrea Vanessa y desata una guerra sin saberlo"	30 August 2024	6.7
10	"Kelly cae en una peligrosa trampa y su vida corre peligro"	2 September 2024	7.4
11	"La agencia de Shaio corre peligro por culpa de los negocios de Edgar"	3 September 2024	7.5
12	"Shaio intenta evitar que Edgar arruine sus planes con la agencia"	4 September 2024	7.6
13	"Shaio tiene un gran dilema"	5 September 2024	6.5
14	"Hollman es dado de baja por un malentendido"	9 September 2024	7.7
15	"Shaio y Nico asisten a su despedida de solteros"	10 September 2024	7.4
16	"Nico busca desesperadamente dinero para su boda"	11 September 2024	8.1
17	"Nico le entrega a Edgar una invitación falsa a su boda"	12 September 2024	7.2
18	"¿Shaio se casa con Nico? Se llega el día del matrimonio"	13 September 2024	6.5
19	"Berny le cuenta a Andrea Vanessa por qué no se opuso a la boda de Shaio"	16 September 2024	7.3
20	"Se revela si Nico es compatible para el trasplante de médula para Joaquín"	17 September 2024	6.8
21	"La vida de Nico corre peligro y Shaio cree que ella es la culpable"	18 September 2024	5.4
22	"Andrea Vanessa pone en jaque a Shaio y su agencia por Berny"	19 September 2024	6.6
23	"Shaio le roba un beso a Berny y le pide que deje a Andrea Vanessa"	20 September 2024	7.2
24	"Las vidas de Andrea Vanessa y Berny podrían cambiar para siempre"	23 September 2024	6.6
25	"Shaio duda que el hijo de Andrea Vanessa sea realmente de Berny"	24 September 2024	7.5
26	"Nico es descubierto siendo infiel"	25 September 2024	7.7
27	"Inicia el tan esperado lanzamiento del calendario de Klass 95"	26 September 2024	8.3
28	"Shaio se practica una prueba de embarazo"	27 September 2024	8.3
29	"Shaio descubre el secreto de Andrea Vanessa y su embarazo"	30 September 2024	6.8
30	"Berny podría ir a la cárcel por haber golpeado a Nico"	1 October 2024	6.6
31	"Nayibe afronta un grave problema por cumplir con los caprichos de Edgar"	2 October 2024	6.2
32	"Berny le revela a Shaio que Paulina habló con él a escondidas"	3 October 2024	6.8
33	"El doctor le dice a Shaio que puede tener dos hijos y Nico propone repartirlos"	4 October 2024	5.9
34	"Shaio insiste en que Klass 95 haga la campaña de cerveza"	7 October 2024	6.5
35	"Shaio toma una decisión radical sobre su matrimonio"	8 October 2024	6.3
36	"Joaquín confronta a Nico y queda entre la espada y la pared"	9 October 2024	6.5
37	"Una enemiga de Edgar regresa a su vida para saldar deudas pendientes"	10 October 2024	6.1
38	"La agencia organiza una gran fiesta para sus invitados del extranjero"	16 October 2024	6.3
39	"La agencia realiza un viaje para la nueva campaña con los italianos"	17 October 2024	6.5
40	"Sale a la luz la trampa con la que Edgar podría ser extraditado"	18 October 2024	6.1
41	"Laura crea un plan para conservar a Andrea Vanessa en la agencia"	21 October 2024	6.7
42	"Shaio entra en labor de parto y Berny y Nico se realizan la prueba de ADN"	22 October 2024	6.9
43	"Elver busca la manera de salir de la cárcel sin quedar perjudicado"	23 October 2024	6.6
44	"Shaio descubre los negocios de Nayibe y toma una decisión sobre la agencia"	24 October 2024	6.6
45	"Berny regresa a Colombia y se encuentra con Shaio, ¿terminan juntos?"	25 October 2024	6.5

== Reception ==
=== Ratings ===
Season	Timeslot (COT)	Episodes	First aired		Last aired		Avg. viewers (in points)
Season	Timeslot (COT)	Episodes	Date	Viewers (in points)	Date	Viewers (in points)	Avg. viewers (in points)
1	Mon–Fri 9:30 p.m.	45	20 August 2024	8.6	25 October 2024	6.5	7.1

=== Awards and nominations ===
Year	Award	Category	Nominated	Result	Ref
2025	Produ Awards	Best Superseries	Klass 95	Won	
