= La gente de la Universal =

1991 film

- Directed by: Felipe Aljure
- Starring: Álvaro Rodríguez
- Release date: December 1991 (HFF)
- Running time: 1h 50min
- Country: Colombia
- Language: Spanish

La gente de la Universal (English translation: The people at the Universal) is a 1991 Colombian drama film directed by Felipe Aljure.
