= General Director of Social Prosperity =

Colombian national government official

General Director of Social Prosperity of Colombia
- Incumbent; Mauricio Rodríguez since July 10, 2025
- Seat: Bogotá, D.C.
- Appointer: President of Colombia
- Inaugural holder: Bruce Mac Master
- Formation: November 5, 2011
- Website: www.prosperidadsocial.gov.co

The General Director of Social Prosperity is the head of the Administrative Department for Social Prosperity, in charge of the formulation, direction, coordination and execution of programs and projects for social inclusion and reconciliation in Colombia.

The current General Director is Mauricio Rodríguez, serving since July 10, 2025.

== List of General Directors of Social Prosperity ==
Name	Assumed office	Left office	President(s) served under	Ref.
Bruce Mac Master	November 5, 2011	October 22, 2013	Juan Manuel Santos	
Gabriel Vallejo	October 22, 2013	August 11, 2014	Juan Manuel Santos	
Tatyana Orozco	August 11, 2014	March 3, 2017	Juan Manuel Santos	
Nemesio Roys Garzón	March 3, 2017	August 7, 2018	Juan Manuel Santos	
Susana Correa	August 7, 2018	March 29, 2022	Iván Duque	
Pierre García	March 29, 2022	July 27, 2022	Iván Duque	
Julián Parra (acting)	July 27, 2022	September 13, 2022	Iván Duque	
Cielo Rusinque	September 13, 2022	September 4, 2023	Gustavo Petro	
Laura Sarabia	September 4, 2023	February 23, 2024	Gustavo Petro	
Iván Fernández (acting)	February 23, 2024	March 5, 2024	Gustavo Petro	
Gustavo Bolívar	March 5, 2024	May 16, 2024	Gustavo Petro	
Mauricio Rodríguez	July 10, 2025	Incumbent	Gustavo Petro	
