= Sandra Beltrán (actress) =

Colombian actress

Sandra Beltran
- Born: Sandra Liliana Beltrán; 5 June 1975 (age 51); Bucaramanga, Colombia
- Occupation: Actress

Sandra Liliana Beltrán, is a Colombian actress born on 5 June 1975 in Bucaramanga. She is well known as Yésica in the series Sin tetas no hay paraíso.

== Telenovelas ==
- El Señor de los Cielos 3ra. Temporada (2015) ... Julia Reyes de Rawlings
- Corazón Valiente (2012–2013) ... Yvonne Matamoros "La Niña Bonita"
- Reto de Mujer (2011) ... Raquel
- El Clon (2010)... Alicia
- El penúltimo beso (2008) ...Gloria
- La marca del deseo (2007) ... Linda Pardo
- Sin tetas no hay paraíso (2006) ... Yésica, la diabla
- La mujer en el espejo (2005) ... Antonia Mutti
- Pecados capitales (2002) ... Eloisa
- A donde va soledad (2000) ... Jenny
- Rauzán (2000) ... María
- Se armó la gorda (2000) ... Ana María Mallarino

== series ==
- mujeres asesinas (2008)...sandra tramitadora
- Tiempo Final (2008)...Dia Perverso
- Regreso a la Guaca (2008)...Nubia
- los Caballeros las Prefieren Brutas (2011)...Sandy
