= Humane Colombia =

Colombian political party

Humane Colombia Colombia Humana
- Founder: Gustavo Petro
- Founded: 2011 (as a movement); 2019 (in alliance with the Patriotic Union); 2021 (as an independent party)
- Dissolved: 3 March 2026
- Split from: Alternative Democratic Pole
- Merged into: Historic Pact
- Headquarters: Bogotá
- Youth wing: Humane Youth (Spanish: Juventud Humana)
- Women's wing: Feminists and Commoners (Spanish: Feministas y Plebeyas)
- Ideology: Progressivism; Anti-neoliberalism; Anti-imperialism; Democratic socialism
- Political position: Left-wing
- National affiliation: Historic Pact for Colombia (since 2021)
- Regional affiliation: São Paulo Forum
- International affiliation: Latin American Socialist Coordination

Website
- www.colombiahumana.co

Humane Colombia (Spanish: Colombia Humana), formerly known as the Progressive Movement (Spanish: Movimiento Progresistas), was a Colombian left-wing political platform and party founded in 2011 and led by Gustavo Petro. The youth wing of the party was known as Juventud Humana (Humane Youth).

== History ==
The movement had its origin in the Bogotá local election of 2011, in which a group of citizens led by Gustavo Petro collected around 300,000 signatures to register the candidacies to the Local Administrative Board, 60,000 signatures to register a list to the City Council headed by Carlos Vicente de Roux, and 120,000 signatures to register Petro's candidacy for the mayorship of Bogotá.

After leaving the mayor's office, Petro decided to run for the presidency of the Republic for the 2018 elections through the mechanism of collecting signatures. Under the promoter committee called Colombia Humana which uses a similar symbology and colours to the movement that the former mayor created to reach the mayoralty and likewise to the slogan of his administration Bogotá Humana, he set about the task of collecting signatures for the sake of registering his candidacy. On 11 December 2017, the last day according to the electoral calendar for registering signatures to endorse presidential candidacies, Petro collected 850,000 signatures.

In August 2018, he was denied legal status by the CNE. This ruling is based on the fact that it was the DECENTES coalition as a whole that obtained the required percentage of votes and not only Colombia Humana, which would not meet the minimum number of votes required. They also argue that the percentage of votes obtained by Petro in the presidential elections are not considered because, according to the constitution, only parties, movements and significant groups of citizens that exceed a percentage of more than 3% of the votes at the national level in the parliamentary elections can be given legal status.

The party is regularly targeted by threats from paramilitary organizations, particularly the Aguilas Negras. Known figures of the party, such as Gustavo Petro, Gustavo Bolivar and Hollman Morris are frequently threatened with death. Nearly a dozen activists from Humane Colombia were assassinated for political reasons in 2020.

In June 2022, Gustavo Petro was elected as president, making him Colombia's first leftist head of state. He won 50.47% of the vote in a runoff election.

With an eye on the 2026 legislative and presidential elections, the member parties chose to start a process of reconfiguration. On 13 June 2025, the Humane Colombia, Alternative Democratic Pole, Patriotic Union, and Colombian Communist parties began the process of merging to create a new collective called Historic Pact (approval of which was granted in September of that year), replacing the coalition of the same name, while others will continue with their independent legal status or in new coalitions. The successor party received legal recognition on 3 December 2025, effectively ceasing the operations of its predecessors.

== Founders ==
Logo of the Progressive Movement

Several of the movement's founders had, like Petro, joined after resigning from the Alternative Democratic Pole party on 2 August 2010 following a meeting of that party's National Executive Committee. Petro claimed to assume the presidency of the Pole using the 1.3 million votes obtained in the 2010 presidential elections; however, by decision of the majority of the board, Clara López was ratified as president of the party. López achieved the backing of over 25 members of the committee, while Petro only achieved the backing of 7 so he decided to create his own movement.

== Seats ==
With the endorsement of the movement, in the 2011 regional elections Petro was elected mayor of Bogotá with more than 700,000 votes; 8 councillors were also elected in Bogotá, 1 in Mosquera (Cundinamarca), and some other councillors in the Atlantic Coast region. Following Colombia's 2015 regional elections, journalist and activist Hollman Morris was elected councillor for the movement with one of the highest votes, while the movement's mayoral candidate, María Mercedes Maldonado, withdrew her candidacy to run in coalition with the Polo Democrático candidate, Clara López.

After the presidential elections, Colombia Humana, which obtained more than eight million votes and came second in the elections, obtained a seat in the Senate and in the House of Representatives, according to the opposition's Statutory Law 1909 of 2008, article 24: "The candidates who follow in votes those who the electoral authority declares elected President and vice-president of the Republic, will have the personal right to occupy, in their order, a seat in the Senate of the Republic and another in the House of Representatives."

== Alliances ==
For the 2014 legislative elections it made a programmatic agreement with the Green Party, a coalition that was renamed Alianza Verde, and under whose legal status it ran several candidates for Congress, with Antonio Navarro being elected as senator and Inti Asprilla and Angélica Lozano as representatives to the Chamber.

On 13 December 2017, party leaders (Gustavo Petro, Aída Avella and Jesús Chávez) agreed to create the so-called List of Decency coalition comprising the Unión Patriótica, the Movimiento Alternativo Indígena y Social, the Alianza Social Independiente and Colombia Humana parties with other sectors of the left to compete in the 2018 legislative and presidential elections.

In 2021, together with various other leftist political parties, Colombia Humana formed the Historic Pact for Colombia for the 2022 congressional elections and the presidential election of the same year. Gustavo Petro was the party's pre-candidate, as well of various other parties, including the Alternative Democratic Pole, Unión Patriótica and the Communist Party.

== Electoral history ==
=== Presidential elections ===
Election Year	Candidate	Running mate	First Round		Second Round		Result
Election Year	Candidate	Running mate	Votes	Percentage	Votes	Percentage	Result
2018	Gustavo Petro	Ángela Robledo	4,855,069	25.09 (#2)	8,040,449	41.77 (#2)	Lost
2022	Gustavo Petro	Francia Márquez	8,542,020	40.34 (#1)	11,292,758	50.42 (#1)	Won

=== Legislative elections ===
Election Year	House of Representatives			Senate		
Election Year	Votes	Percentage	Seats	Votes	Percentage	Seats
2022	With Historic Pact			With Historic Pact		
