= Gustavo Bolívar (author) =

Colombian author, screenwriter and politician (born 1966)

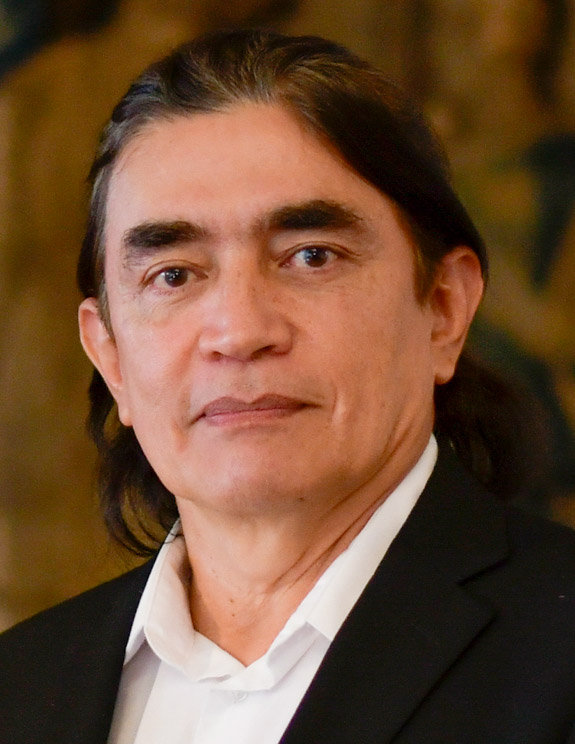

General Director of Social Prosperity
- In office 5 March 2024 – 16 May 2025
- President: Gustavo Petro
- Preceded by: Laura Sarabia
- Succeeded by: Álvaro Rodríguez

Senator of Colombia
- In office 20 July 2018 – 31 December 2022

Personal details
- Born: Gustavo Bolívar Moreno; 22 February 1966 (age 60) Girardot, Cundinamarca, Colombia
- Party: Humane Colombia (since 2022)
- Education: University of La Sabana

Gustavo Bolívar Moreno (born 22 July 1966) is a Colombian politician, author, and journalist who served as the General Director of Social Prosperity from March 2024 to May 2025 under President Gustavo Petro and previously as a Senator of Colombia from 2018 to 2022.

Among his most well-known novels is Sin tetas no hay paraiso, which would gain international fame for its three television adaptations: Sin tetas no hay paraíso, produced by Caracol Television in 2006, Sin senos no hay paraíso produced and broadcast by RTI Producciones–Telemundo in 2008, and Sin tetas no hay paraíso, adapted by the Spanish television channel Telecinco, produced in 2008 and broadcast in 2009. It was also adapted into a film directed by Bolívar in 2011.

He is also known for writing the novel El capo and later adapting it to a telenovela. He also created the telenovelas Victorinos, Ojo por ojo and Tres Caínes.

During his time in the senate, Bolívar was the only senator to donate his entire salary to social works and digital media, Cuarto de hora.

== Adaptations ==
- Sin senos no hay paraíso (Telemundo series)
- Without Breasts There Is No Paradise (NBC series)
- Sin senos sí hay paraíso (Telemundo series)

Political offices
Preceded by Laura Sarabia	General Director of Social Prosperity; 2024-present	Incumbent
Party political offices
New political party	Humane Colombia nominee for Mayor of Bogotá; 2023	Most recent
