= Sin tetas no hay paraíso =

Colombian television series (2006)

- Genre: Telenovela
- Created by: Gustavo Bolívar
- Based on: Sin tetas no hay paraíso by Gustavo Bolívar
- Directed by: Luis Alberto Restrepo
- Creative directors: Gŭarnizo and Lizaralde
- Starring: María Adelaida Puerta; Patricia Ercole; Sandra Beltrán; Nicolás Rincón; Andrés Toro; Marlon Moreno; Jenni Osorio; Marilyn Patiño; Margarita Rosa Arias; Fabio Restrepo; Ernesto Benjumea; Cristóbal Errazúriz; Juan Pablo Franco; Ramses Ramos
- Opening theme: "Agujero" by JOX
- Country of origin: Colombia
- Original language: Spanish
- No. of seasons: 1
- No. of episodes: 23

Production
- Executive producer: Claudia Valencia
- Editor: Sara Libis
- Camera setup: Multi-camera

Original release
- Network: Caracol Televisión
- Release: August 16 – October 13, 2006

Related
- Sin senos no hay paraíso; Sin senos sí hay paraíso; Without Breasts There Is No Paradise

Sin tetas no hay paraíso (Without Breasts There Is No Paradise) is a Colombian telenovela, produced, and aired by Caracol TV. The show is based on the best-selling novel of the same name written by Gustavo Bolivar.

The story is based on a young girl, Catalina, who lives in Pereira and becomes obsessed with getting breast implants in order to overcome poverty. Catalina decides to become a "prepago" (prepaid), a prostitute who has sex with drug traffickers in exchange for gifts, money, and social status.

The complete, uncut series was released on DVD in the United States under the title Sin Pechos No Hay Paraíso on October 13, 2009, by DistriMax Inc.; the five-disc set includes English subtitles.

Telemundo aired this series on February 8, 2010, with English captions on CC3. When it premiered, the word "Tetas" was censored out and replaced with an image of a bra in between the first T and the final S because its English translation "tits" was censored from broadcast television by the FCC. This show lasted for about one month as there were only 23 episodes produced.

== Plot ==
Catalina (María Adelaida Puerta) is a young, beautiful girl living in extreme poverty with her brother, Bayron (Andrés Toro) and her mother, Hilda (Patricia Ércole), in Pereira, Colombia. Catalina becomes obsessed with getting breast implants in order to escape poverty and gain social status and money. She abandons her boyfriend, Albeiro (Nicolas Rincón) and, is guided by her best friend, Yésica (Sandra Beltrán), a ruthless pimp who has also involved Catalina's friends into the business, Ximena, Paola and Vanesa, to get to drug traffickers who pay for sexual services.

As the story progresses, Catalina becomes obsessed with gaining more and more money. She even puts her life, Yésica's life and her mother's life in jeopardy by threatening a prominent drug dealer, Titi (Marlon Moreno) that she would snitch on him. Eventually Catalina marries Marcial Barrera (Fabio Restrepo), another drug trafficker and starts a life full of luxury, corruption, bribing and killings. Her brother Byron has strayed as well, having become a hitman. Meanwhile, her former boyfriend Albeiro and her mother Hilda, apparently the only characters in the story that keep their integrity up to the end, start a relationship behind her back. Catalina has lost her integrity entirely by treating otherwise atrocious actions (paid murders, blackmailing, bribing) as casual events needed to gain status and money.

Catalina snitches Titi to the Police in order to earn the $1 million award and prepares to leave Marcial as soon as he secures a financial support for her in his will. However she faces serious implications from her low quality breast implants, undergoes several surgeries to replace them and she is eventually obliged to remove them, having been warned that she will die unless she abandons all the breast implant business for at least two years. Yésica, realizing that Marcial will soon get bored of Catalina, takes the opportunity and betrays her, getting romantically involved with Marcial herself. She eventually persuades Marcial to marry her and abandon Catalina without money.

At the end, Catalina realizes how miserable her life is since she became a call-girl. The fact that her ex-boyfriend Albeiro and her Mother were having a relationship behind her back, the death of her brother Byron (who was shot down by the police after having murdered a target as a hired killer), the loss of her implants, her kicking out of Marcial's home and the betrayal of her best friend, Yésica, all these events cause Catalina to lose the will to live, and, not having the courage to commit suicide, she decides to seek revenge and kill Yésica for betraying her. She hires killers to murder Yésica by inviting her to a café and giving them directions that Yésica is dressed a certain way and sitting at a table by herself reading a book. The killers kill the girl by shooting her, later to be shown that the girl killed is actually Catalina, who had a change of mind and she instead decided to plot her own assassination by disguising herself as Yésica. The story ends with a somewhat more mourning form of the title song, "El Agujero".

== Cast ==
- Maria Adelaida Puerta as Catalina Santana
- Patricia Ercole as Doña Hilda
- Sandra Beltrán as Yesica "La Diabla"
- Nicolas Rincón as Albeiro Manrique
- Andrés Toro as Byron Santana
- Marlon Moreno as Aurelio Jaramillo "El Titi"
- Jenni Osorio as Ximena
- Marilyn Patiño as Paola
- Margarita Rosa Arias as Vanesa
- Fabio Restrepo as Marcial Barrera
- Ernesto Benjumea as Octavio
- Cristóbal Errázuriz as Cardona
- Ramses Ramos as Pelambre
- Karola Sánchez as Daniela Mejía
- Luces Velásquez as Margot
- Mauricio Mejía as Profesor Mariño
- Juan Carlos Pérez Almanza as Makinón
- Saín Castro as Doctor Molina
- Carlos Manuel Vesga as Portero Carrillo

== See also ==
- Without Breasts There Is No Paradise
- Sin Senos no hay Paraíso
- List of famous telenovelas
