= Felipe Aljure =

Colombian film director

Felipe Aljure is a Colombian film director and screenwriter. He is best known for his first film La Gente de la Universal. His films have been described as bringing technical and narrative innovations to Colombian film. He has also created television series, lectured at universities, and served as the director of the Cartagena Film Festival.
