= Sin senos no hay paraíso =

Television series

- Genre: Telenovela
- Created by: Gustavo Bolívar
- Based on: Sin tetas no hay paraíso by Gustavo Bolívar
- Directed by: Miguel Varoni; Ramiro Meneses
- Creative director: Piedad Arango
- Starring: Carmen Villalobos; Catherine Siachoque; María Fernanda Yepes; Aylín Mújica; Fabián Ríos; Gregorio Pernía; Sofía Lama; Roberto Mateos; Gabriel Porras; Juan Pablo Shuk; César Mora
- Music by: Miguel de Narváez
- Opening theme: "Sin senos no hay paraíso" performed by Natalia Gutiérrez and Hernán Saraza
- Original language: Spanish
- No. of seasons: 1
- No. of episodes: 167

Production
- Executive producers: Jorge Sastoque Roa; Mary-Kathryn Kennedy; Hugo León Ferrer
- Cinematography: Juan Pablo Puentes; Édgar Neisa
- Editor: José Luis Varón
- Camera setup: Multi-camera
- Production companies: RTI Producciones; Telemundo Studios

Original release
- Network: Telemundo
- Release: June 16, 2008 – June 22, 2009

Related
- Sin senos sí hay paraíso; Sin tetas no hay paraíso

Sin senos no hay paraíso (Without Breasts There Is No Paradise) is a RTI Colombia–Telemundo telenovela remake and loose adaptation of the original Colombian series Sin tetas no hay paraíso. The series is based on investigative journalist Gustavo Bolivar's debut novel and features an attractive young prostitute who desires to have massive breast implants in order to attract a rich cocaine smuggler. The series premiered on June 16, 2008. It is based on a true story.

== Plot ==
Catalina Santana (Carmen Villalobos), a 15 year old girl in Pereira, Colombia, is willing to risk everything in order to escape the poverty she lives in and fulfill her dreams - even if this means putting her life and her integrity in jeopardy. Her mother Hilda (Catherine Siachoque), a lovely hard-working woman with no resources to provide her children with luxuries, expends boundless energy in her efforts to push both her children, Catalina and her brother Bayron (Juan Diego Sánchez) to prosper. In spite of their mother's efforts, Bayron and Catalina's situation is filled with poverty and need.

Catalina is beautiful, but is not as voluptuous as her friends who render sexual services as "pre-paid girls" to powerful men in the drug trafficking world. Jéssica "La Diabla" (María Fernanda Yépez), Catalina's best friend, entered this world with her own business as a "madame": recruiting, selecting, and leading groups of women for whom the drug traffickers pay in advance to receive sexual services, which she introduces to Catalina this culture, convincing her that this is the only way she has to get away from her poverty. Once inside, Catalina falls into the manipulative hands of Lorena (Aylín Mújica), Jéssica's Mexican equivalent, who together with Martinez, an important member of the Juarez Cartel, convinces inexperienced young women from Colombia to undergo breast surgery as a means of obtaining a better life in another country. What they don't know is that in reality he uses them as "mules", sending them to Mexico while smuggling heroin in their implants.

Catalina, dazzled by a world of riches and a life full of luxuries, decides not to continue her relationship with her boyfriend Albeiro, a young man from her town who has very few ambitions, but loves her with all his heart. She decides to search for someone who can pay for or finance her surgery of silicon breast implants since, according to her belief, this will provide her the fame and wealth she longs for.

In the end, Catalina begins to remember how hard her life has been since she became a pre-paid girl: having an illegal abortion after being raped by three men, facing struggles in order to get her breasts augmented and the loss of her breast implants due to medical complications, the death of her brother Bayron, finding out that her mother and Albeiro were having a romantic relationship behind her back which resulted in her mother becoming pregnant, and finally getting kicked out of her own house by her drug-dealer husband Marcial, after Jéssica betrayed her and told Marcial that Catalina had lied to him about trying to turn him into the DEA (Drug Enforcement Administration). After all she is left feeling lost, forgotten, betrayed and alone. All these events cause Catalina to lose the will to live, and she tries to commit suicide but does not find the courage to pull through, so she decides to seek revenge and kill Jéssica for betraying her by inviting her to a cafe and calling the hired killers, as she gives them the details to distinguish Jéssica among the other people. The killers do their job and kill Jéssica, by shooting her three times in the back, later to be shown that the girl killed is in fact, Catalina, who had a change of mind; instead of killing Yésica, she decided to plot her own assassination by disguising herself as Jéssica. Before being shot, Catalina wrote in the book she was holding, the line which gave the series its title, "It's a lie - without breasts there is no paradise."

== Production ==
Gustavo Bolivar's heroine is a prepago, or "pre-paid girl", which means she sells her services around-the-clock for a set period, hoping to make extra money. The screenwriter says Paraíso highlights an unflattering part of his country: teenagers in the Colombian narco-culture getting breast implants. According to Bolivar, he didn't imagine it would come to touch on a universal theme: "beauty based in vanity and its connection with money" and noted that no other book had denounced the drug dealers in such bad terms, the ignorant mothers who confuse love for their daughters with pimping, and the unscrupulous plastic surgeons.

Bolívar says the story is based on real-life conditions facing child prostitutes in the province (departamento) of Pereira, Colombia. There he met two girls who were desperate for silicone breast implants. One told him that she got her operation in exchange for sex. Unfortunately, the doctor used a pair of used implants that led to allergic reactions and infection.

Telemundo began shooting the series at Telemundo's production centers in Bogotá and Girardot, Colombia, as well as its studio in Sinaloa, Mexico, on April 15, 2008. As with most of its soap operas, the network broadcast English subtitles as closed captions on CC3 until late October, when the network briefly canceled the translations. Captions were restored the following April. A version with on-screen English subtitles debuted on Mun2 in 2009.

== Cast members ==
- Carmen Villalobos as Catalina Santana
- Catherine Siachoque as Hilda Santana
- María Fernanda Yépez as Yessica Franco "La Diabla"
- Aylín Mújica as Lorena Magallanes
- Fabián Ríos as Albeiro Manrique
- Gregorio Pernia as Aurelio Jaramillo
- Carolina Sepúlveda as Ximena
- Sofía Stamatiades as Julieta
- Roberto Mateos as José Miguel Cárdenas
- Gabriel Porras as Fernando Rey
- Juan Pablo Shuk as Mauricio Contento
- César Mora as Marcial Barrera
- Angélica Blandón as Camila
- Alejandra Pinzón as Paola

== Media ==
In the summer of 2015, the complete telenovela was made available to stream on Netflix in the United States, along with a handful of other Telemundo programming.

=== English release ===
NBC Universal commissioned Universal Media Studios to produce an English-language version of the serial, using a different cast and script.

== Sequel ==
On July 19, 2016, Telemundo began airing a sequel telenovela, Sin senos sí hay paraíso.

On July 25, 2017, Telemundo aired the third sequel to the telenovela where Carmen Villalobos reappears.
