= Henry Price (painter) =

British musician and painter (1819–1863)

- Born: 5 May 1819; London, England
- Died: 12 December 1863 (aged 44); Brooklyn, New York City, New York, United States
- Spouse: Elisa Castello

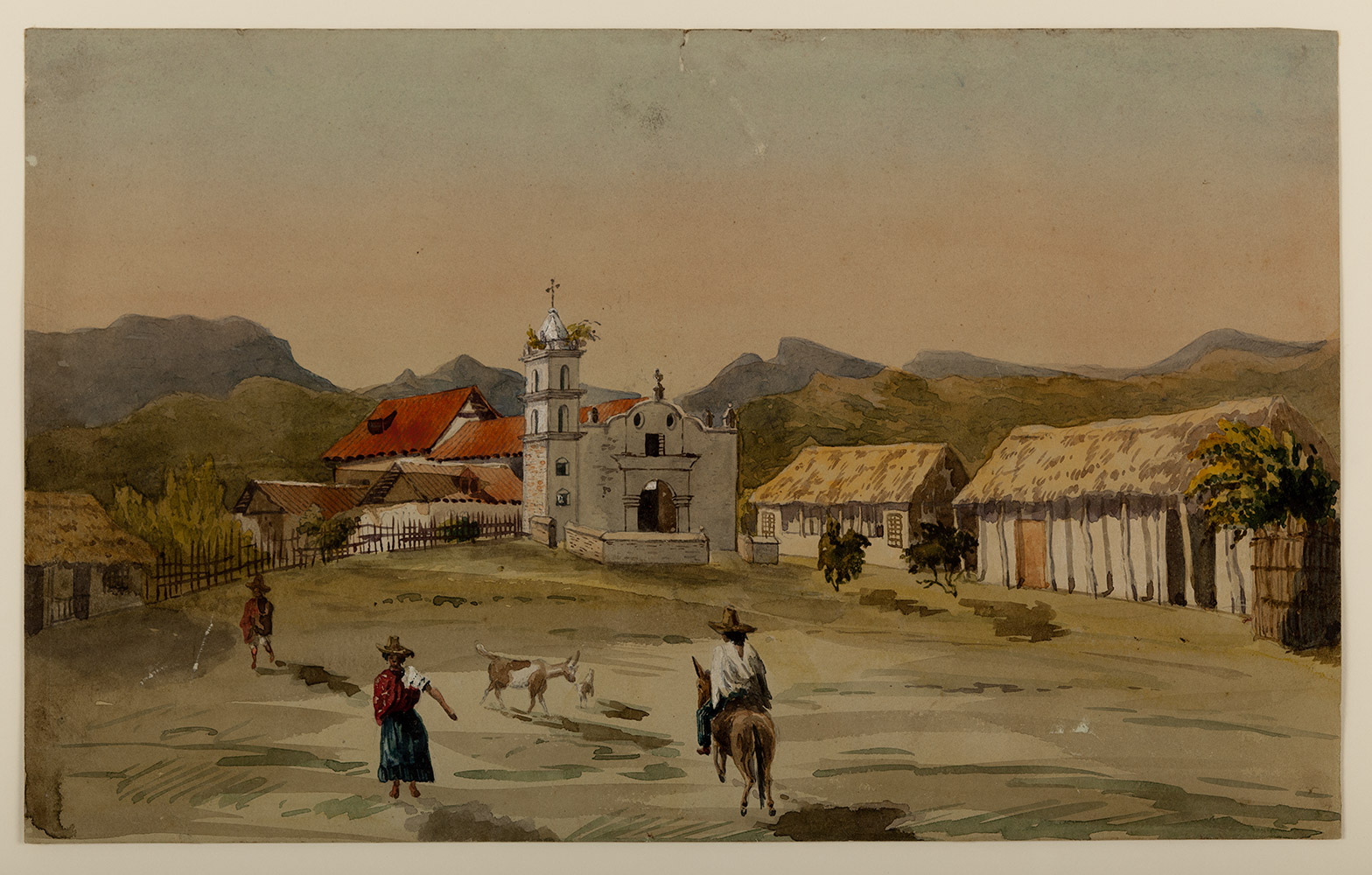
Tocaima (Provincia de Bogotá), watercolor on paper, 20.2 by 32.6 centimeters (8.0 in × 12.8 in), Bogotá, Art Collection of the Bank of the Republic.

Henry Price (5 May 1819 – 12 December 1863) was a British musician and painter who specialized in landscape watercolors. After studying painting and violin in London, he went to New York, where he married Elisa Castello, a Colombian woman. In 1841, they moved to Bogotá, Colombia. In 1847, he co-founded the Philharmonic Society of Bogotá (la Sociedad Filarmónica de Bogotá) and its music school (Escuela de Música).

He participated in the third phase of the Comisión Corográfica (1850–1859), led by Agustín Codazzi, who replaced the Venezuelan painter Carmelo Fernández. The Comisión Corográfica had been founded according to an 1839 law with the mission of creating an official map of Colombia and studying the country's geography. On his trip from Santa Marta to Bogotá together with the Comisión Corográfica, between January and August 1858, he painted the people who lived on the banks of the Magdalena River. He was a renowned landscape artist. His watercolors reflected the scenes and social customs he saw.

During his travels, he became hemiplegic. According to his family, he was poisoned by his watercolor pigments. He was replaced by a Colombian artist, Manuel María Paz. He returned to New York, where he died in Brooklyn on 12 December 1863 at age 44.
