= Manuel María Paz =

Colombian scientist and military officer

Manuel María Paz Delgado
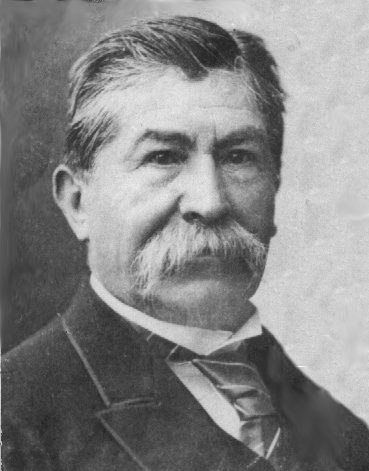
- Born: June 6, 1820; Almaguer
- Died: September 16, 1902 (aged 82); Bogotá
- Occupations: Cartographer, military officer, artist and painter
- Years active: 1832-1895
- Organization: Comisión Corográfica
- Spouse: Felisa Castro
- Children: José Domingo, Felisa, Francisco, María, Ana María, Julián
- Parent(s): Domingo de Paz, Baltazara Delgado
- Relatives: José Miguel de Paz, Carmen de Paz

Manuel María Paz Delgado (1820 – 1902) was a Colombian cartographer, military officer, artist and watercolorist.

== Biography ==
Manuel María Paz Delgado was born June 6, 1820, in the town of Almaguer, Cauca, Viceroyalty of New Granada. His parents were Domingo de Paz and Baltazara Delgado, and his siblings were José Miguel de Paz and Carmen de Paz. After studying literature in his native Amaguer and still being quite young, he moved to Popayán to serve as a soldier in the Guardia Nacional, on December 29, 1839.

As a private he participated in several civil wars of the Republic of New Granada, and distinguished himself for his bravery. As the years passed, he rose through the military ranks, obtaining the rank of colonel in 1848. Along with his military career, he was also simultaneously developing a career as a painter and cartographer, participating in an 1848 artistic exhibition with the "Mesa Revuelta", a work highly admired by the exhibition's selection jury.

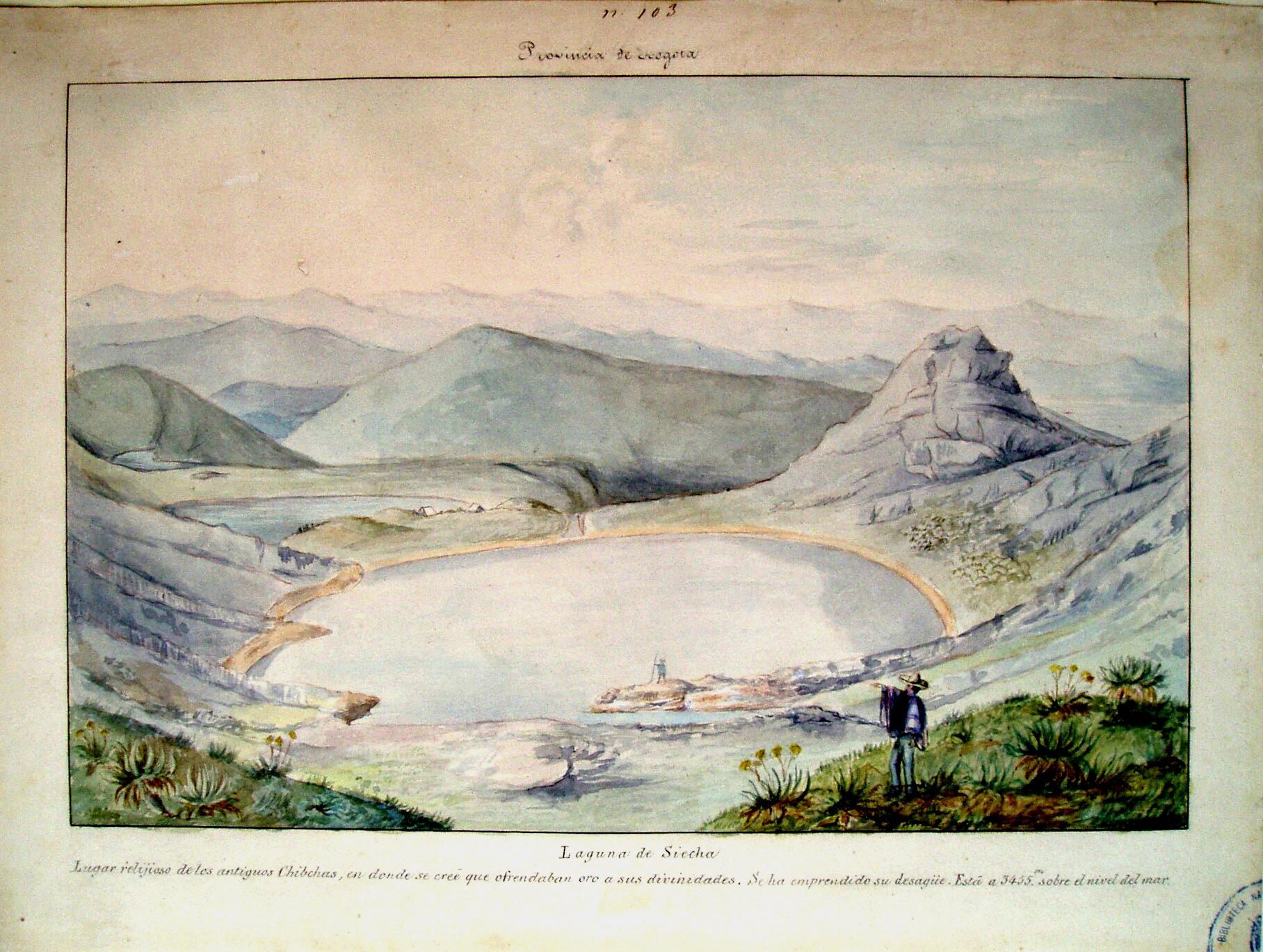
Watercolor of the Lagunas de Siecha, in Chingaza Natural National Park, painted by Manuel María Paz in 1855 during the Comisión Corográfica.

In 1852 he married Felisa Castro. Six children resulted from this union, José Domingo, Felisa, Francisco, María, Ana María y Julián. In 1853 he joined the Comisión Corográfica to work as an artist with Henry Price, who later retired from the project for reasons of health.

Between 1853 and 1858 he painted 127 lithographed watercolors, which not only served to illustrate the work of the Comisión, but also included other works published separately under the auspices of Agustín Codazzi. During these years, María Paz also assisted the celebrated geographer in creating maps of the different regions of the country.

Codazzi died in 1859, in the arms of his friend Manuel María Paz. As a result, the work of the Comisión came to a complete stop. Tomás Cipriano de Mosquera did not want the work to be lost, so he contracted with María Paz and Manuel Ponce de León to finish the works begun under the direction of General Codazzi, and to publish them. As a result of this effort, the Atlas de los Estados Unidos de Colombia appeared in 1865, followed by the Atlas Geográfico e Histórico de la República de Colombia in 1889. The French Société de géographie conferred membership on Paz on December 6, 1889, based on the second of the two publications.

In the period between the publication of the two works, he also participated in various artistic expositions, such as an 1871 exhibition commemorating celebrating the fiestas patrias (patriotic national holidays), and in 1883, as a part of the celebrations commemorating the birth of Simón Bolívar the liberator.

After an exhausting but productive life, Manual María Paz Delgado died on September 16, 1902, in the parish of San Victorino in Bogotá.

== Publications ==
- Atlas de los Estados Unidos de Colombia (1865). Edited with Manuel Ponce de León.
- Atlas Geográfico e Histórico de la República de Colombia (1889). Edited with Felipe Pérez.
- Carta del territorio de los chibchas (1894).
- Diccionario Geográfico Estadístico Histórico de la Nueva Granada.
- Itinerario general de las distancias que existen en la capital de los Estados Unidos de Colombia a las diferentes poblaciones de cada uno de los estados (1870).
- Láminas de la Comisión Corográfica (1853–1858).
- Mapa Económico de la República de Colombia.
- Mapa General de Colombia y los particulares de los Estados (1873).
- Primer Itinerario de Distancias de la República de Colombia.
- Libreta de apuntes (2011) Facsimile edition of the pamphlet. Contains drawings and sketches drawn during the seventh and eight expeditions of the Comisión Corográfica. Published by the Universidad de Caldas and the Universidad EAFIT.

== Paintings ==
- Paintings by Manuel María Paz Delgado from the Comisión Corográfica are held in the collections of the National Library of Colombia, and accessible online.
