= Martín Tovar y Tovar =

Venezuelan painter (1827–1902)

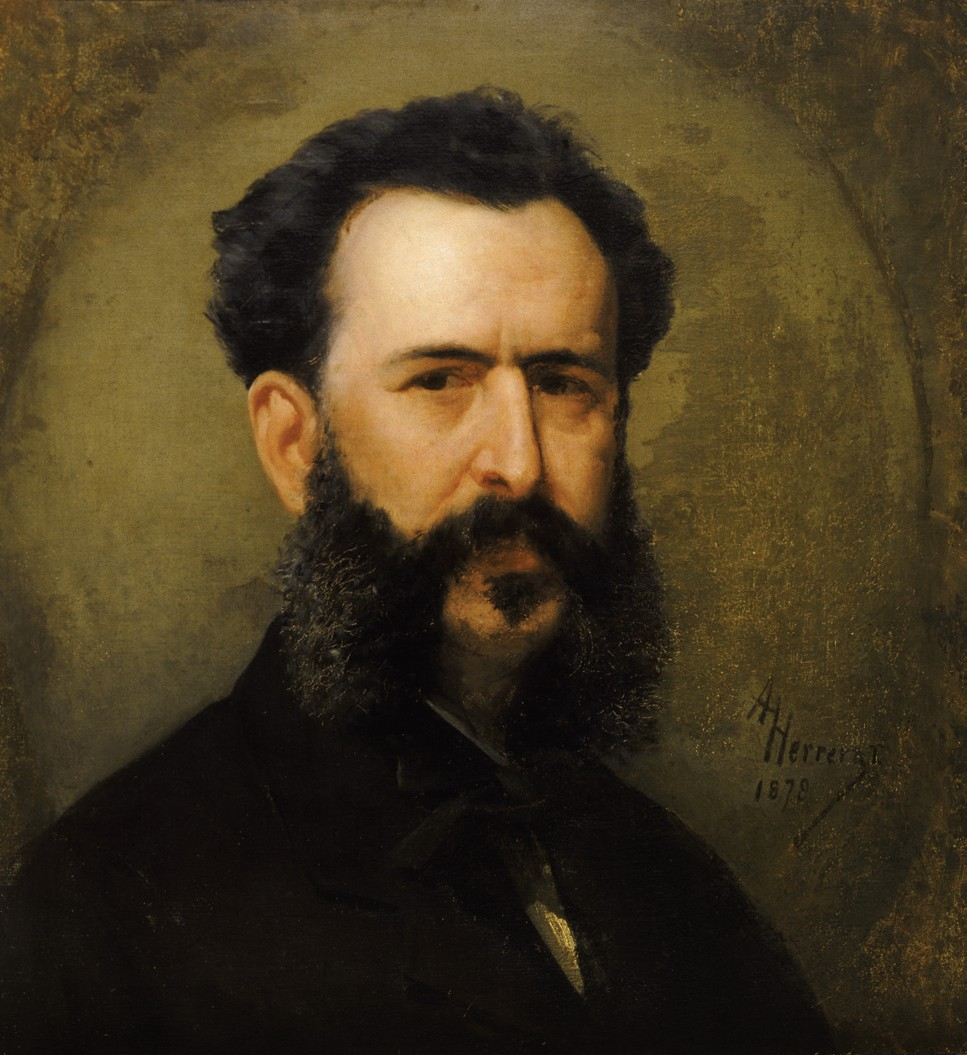
- Portrait by Antonio Herrera Toro, 1878
- Born: Martín Tovar y Tovar; February 10, 1827; Caracas, Venezuela
- Died: December 17, 1902 (aged 75); Caracas, Venezuela
- Education: Real Academia de Bellas Artes de San Fernando (Madrid)
- Known for: Portrait painting, historical scenes, photography
- Notable work: Signing of the Venezuelan Declaration of Independence (1883), portraits for the Salón Elíptico, battle scenes of Carabobo, Boyacá, Junín, Ayacucho
- Style: Academic art, historical realism
- Movement: Venezuelan academicism
- Parents: Antonio María Tovar (father); Damiana Tovar Liendo (mother)
- Awards: Gold Medal, Exposición Nacional de Venezuela; 1883
- Elected: Director of the Academia de Bellas Artes (Caracas)
- Patrons: Antonio Guzmán Blanco

Martín Tovar y Tovar (10 February 1827 – 17 December 1902) was a Venezuelan painter, best known for his portraits and historical scenes.

== Biography ==
Tovar was born and died in Caracas. His father, Antonio María Tovar (1791–1860), was a former official of the Spanish government who had retired after receiving influenza. His mother, Damiana Tovar Liendo (c.1805–1844), was from Caracas. The family had been living in exile in Puerto Rico, but returned to Venezuela immediately before Tovar's birth.

He received his first lessons from Celestino Martínez who, at the age of nineteen, had just become an instructor at the "Academia de Dibujo" (Drawing Academy). Later, Tovar studied at the Academy itself with Antonio José Carranza and at the "Colegio de La Paz" with Carmelo Fernández. In 1844, he joined with Fernández and two other artists to acquire a lithography workshop owned by German emigrants.

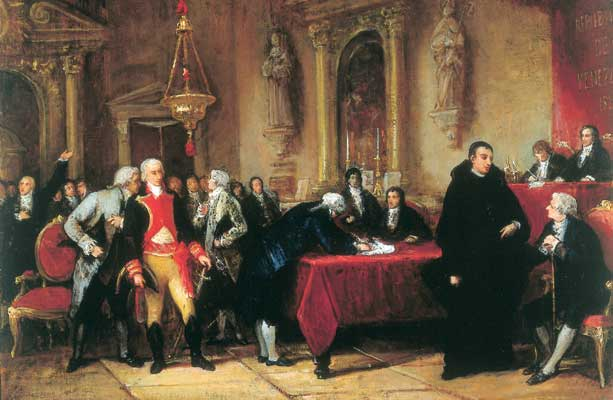
Study for the Signing of the Venezuelan Declaration of Independence

In 1850, he travelled to Spain and enrolled at the Real Academia de Bellas Artes de San Fernando in Madrid. There, he studied with José de Madrazo and his son, Federico de Madrazo, among others. In 1851, he opened a shop called "Fotografía Artística de Martín Tovar y Tovar", becoming one of his country's pioneer photographers. In 1852, he moved to Paris and found a position in the workshop of Léon Cogniet. Three years later, he returned to Venezuela, but stayed for only a year before going back to Paris to copy paintings by the major artists, with a view towards using them to establish a national museum in Caracas. His proposal was accepted, but a lack of funds kept it from being realized.

He continued to focus on portraits, however, and participated in several exhibitions, including the International Exposition (1867) in Paris. Two years later, he was appointed Director of the "Academia de Bellas Artes" in Caracas. In 1872, he exhibited at the "Primera Exposición Anual de Bellas Artes Venezolanas", organized by the explorers James Mudie Spence (1836–1878) and Anton Goering (who was also a painter).

In 1873, he received what would be his largest commission; painting 30 portraits of heroes from the War of Independence and other public figures for the "Salón Elíptico" at the Palacio Federal Legislativo, a project that would occupy him for two years. In 1881, he received another commission from President Antonio Guzmán Blanco; a large canvas depicting the signing of the Venezuelan Declaration of Independence, also for the "Salón Elíptico". The work was presented at the "Exposición Nacional de Venezuela" in 1883 and was awarded a gold medal. This resulted in further commissions to portray the battles of Carabobo, Boyacá, Junín and Ayacucho. After researching and sketching the battle sites, he set up a workshop in Paris, which he maintained from 1887 to the late 1890s, commuting between there and Caracas and doing more portraits as well as the battle scenes. He had finished only three of the battles when he died in 1902. The Battle of Ayucucho was completed by Antonio Herrera Toro, using Tovar's studies.

== Selected portraits ==
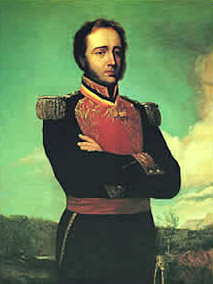
Gregor MacGregor

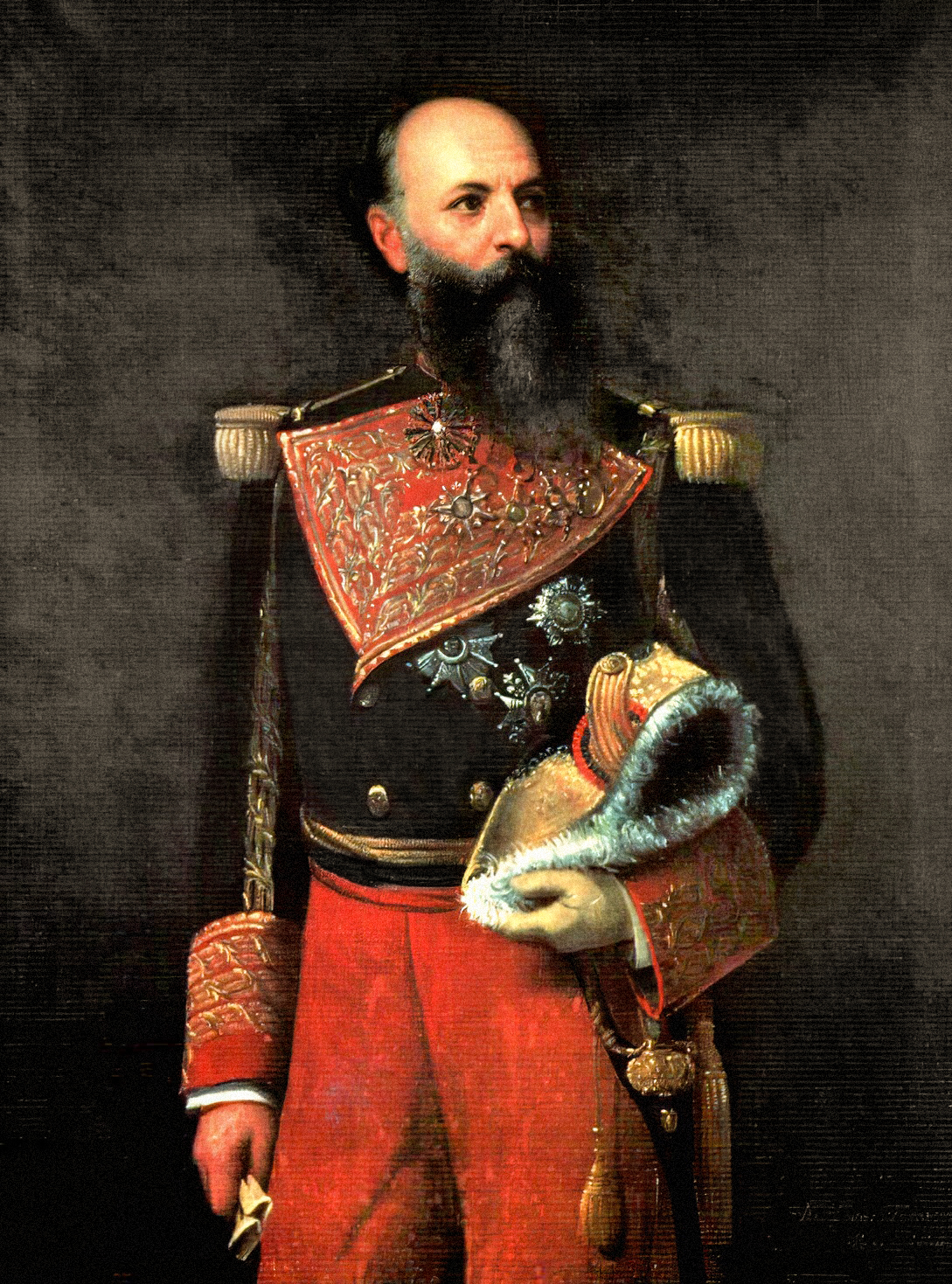
Antonio Guzmán Blanco

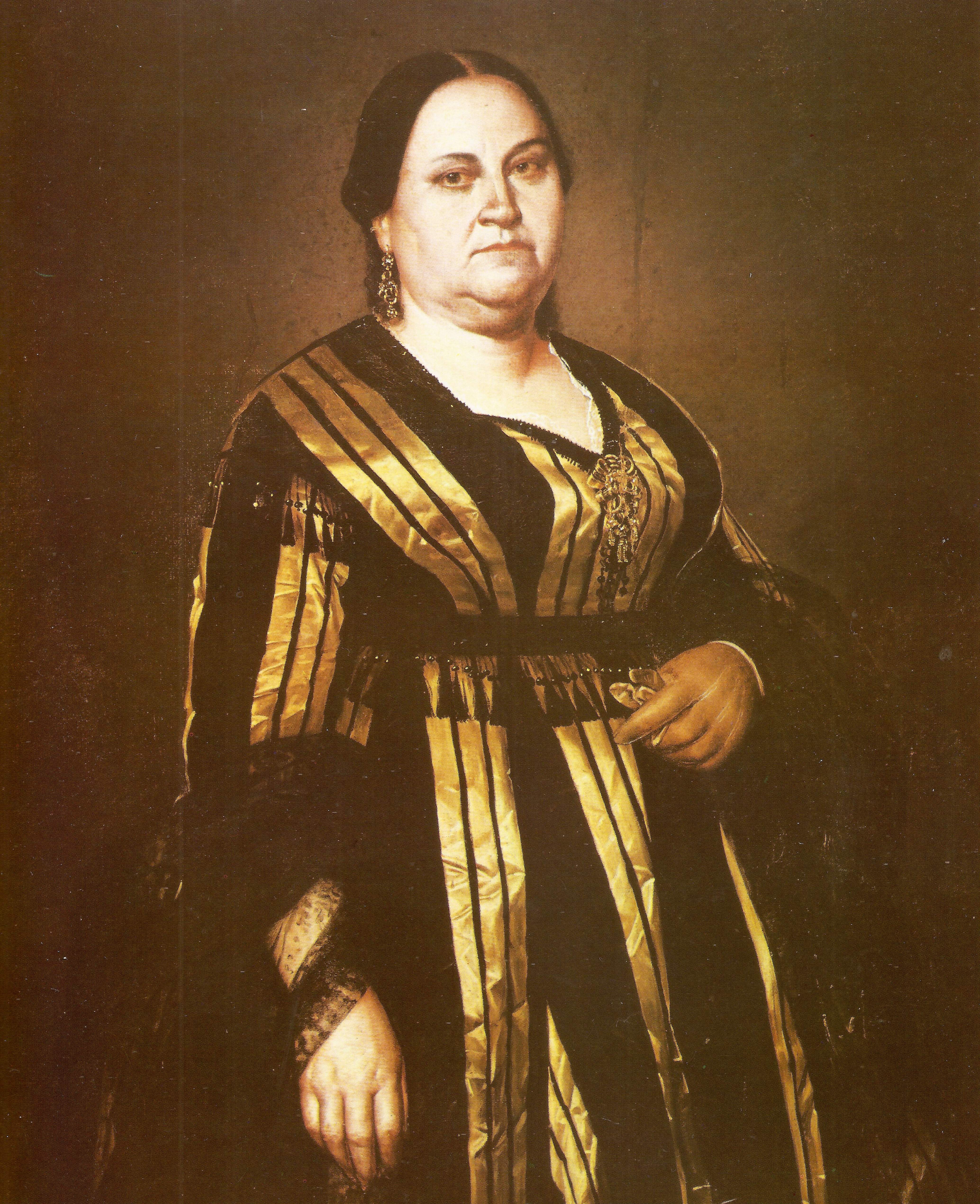
Guzmán's mother, Carlota

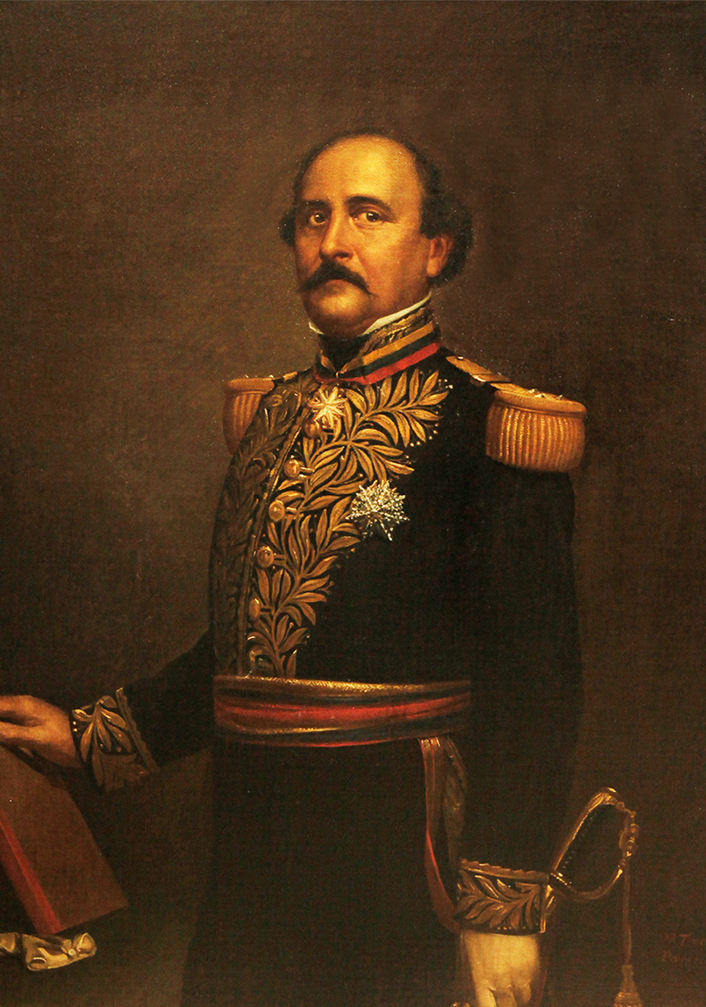
Juan Crisóstomo Falcón

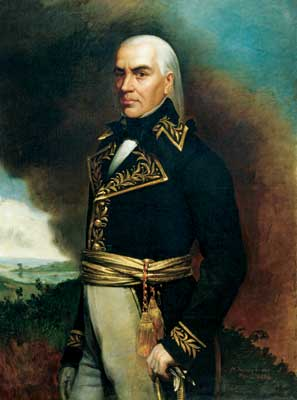
Francisco de Miranda
