= Antonio José =

Antonio José may refer to:

== People ==
- Antonio Díaz (karateka), full name Antonio José Díaz Fernández (born 1980), Venezuelan kata martial artist
- Antonio José Álvarez de Abreu, Spanish noble and lawyer
- Antonio José Amar y Borbón, Spanish military officer and colonial official
- Antonio José Benavides, Venezuelan general
- Antonio José Carranza, Venezuelan painter
- Antonio José Cavanilles, Spanish botanist
- Antonio José Cañas, Salvadoran military officer, diplomat and politician
- Antonio José de Sucre (1795–1830), Venezuelan independence leader, President of Peru, President of Bolivia
- Antonio José González Zumárraga, Ecuadorian cardinal
- Antonio José Herrero Uceda, Spanish painter
- Antonio José López Martínez, Spanish footballer
- Antonio José Martínez, American priest, educator and publisher
- Antonio José Martínez Palacios, Spanish composer
- Antonio José Pardo Andretta, Venezuelan alpine skier
- Antonio José Ramírez Salaverría, Venezuelan prelate
- Antonio José Sánchez Mazuecos, Spanish singer
- Antonio José Ruiz de Padrón, Spanish politician and priest
- Antonio José de Irisarri, Guatemalan statesman, journalist and politician
- Antonio José de Sucre, Venezuelan independence leader and former president of Perú and Bolivia

== See also ==
- Antonio José de Sucre Airport, an airport in Cumaná, Venezuela
- Antonio José de Sucre Municipality, a Venezuelan municipality in the state of Barinas
