= Almaguer =

Almaguer is a surname. Notable people with the surname include:

- Frank Almaguer (born 1945), United States diplomat
- Ilean Almaguer (born 1990), Mexican actress best known for her roles in telenovelas and dozens of TV commercials
- Sergio Almaguer (born 1969), Mexican coach and former defender and Striker
- Miguel Almaguer (born 1977/78), NBC News correspondent for Los Angeles bureau

== See also ==
- Almaguer, Cauca, town and municipality in the Cauca Department, Colombia
- Corral de Almaguer, Spanish municipality of Toledo province, in the autonomous community of Castile-La Mancha
