= Bertilda Samper Acosta =

Colombian nun, poet and writer (1856–1910)

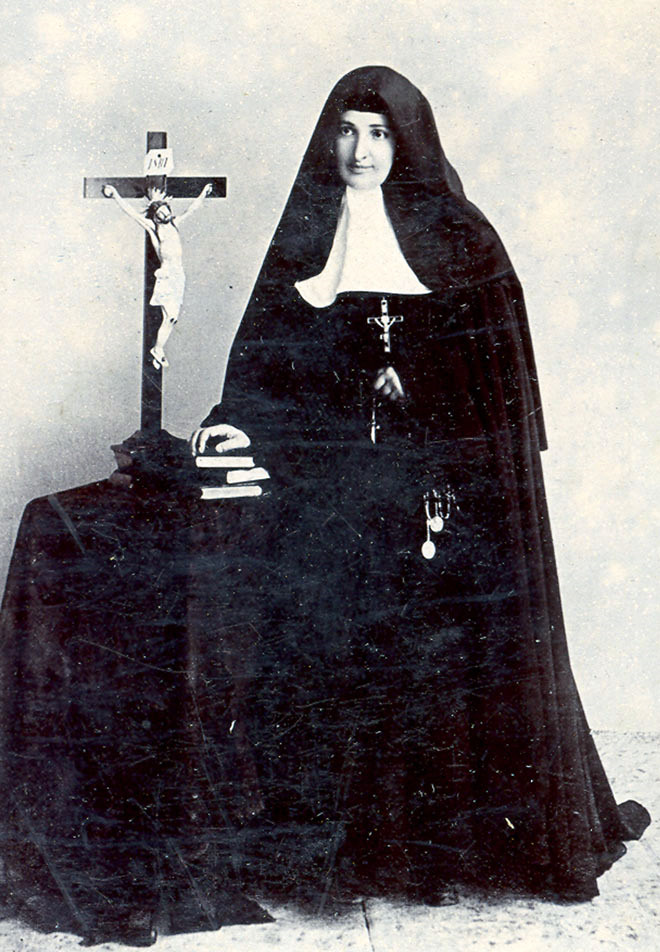
- Photograph of Sister María Ignacia.
- Born: Bertilda Samper Acosta; 31 July 1856; Bogotá, Cundinamarca, New Granada
- Died: 31 July 1910 (aged 54); Bogotá, Cundinamarca, Colombia
- Occupation: Nun
- Relatives: José María Samper Agudelo (father); Soledad Acosta Kemble (mother); Tomás Joaquín de Acosta y Pérez de Guzmán (grandfather); Miguel Samper Agudelo (uncle); Agripina Samper Agudelo (aunt)
- Writing career
- Pen name: Berenice
- Language: Spanish
- Period: 1880—1910
- Genre: Lyric poetry
- Subject: Devotionals
- Notable work: Novena de Aguinaldos

Sister María Ignacia, OSC, born Bertilda Samper Acosta (31 July 1856 – 31 July 1910) was a Colombian Poor Clare nun, poet and writer. She was the daughter of José María Samper Agudelo and Soledad Acosta Kemble, both renowned writers and journalists of their time in Colombia.

Although most of her poetry has remained unpublished, she is known for her revision and expansion of the novena of aguinaldos, a popular devotional novena of Advent during the Christmas season in Colombia, also popular in Ecuador and Venezuela.
