= Francisco Briceño =

Francisco Briceño Gasco (Corral de Almaguer, Spain, around 1500 - Santa Fe de Bogotá, New Kingdom of Granada, 13 December 1575) was a lawyer in the Spanish Empire who held high positions in the Spanish colonization of America.

== Biography ==
From 1550 to 1553, he was governor of Popayán Province, where the city of Almaguer, Cauca was founded in 1551 and named after his birthplace.
He was governor of the Captaincy General of Guatemala and president of the Real Audiencia of Guatemala from 1563 to 1565. From 1565 to 1570, he held only the position of governor of the Province of Guatemala —present-day Guatemala, Belize, and El Salvador— which were militarily, judicially, and economically subordinate to the Viceroyalty of Peru.

Between 23 March and 13 December 1575, he was appointed president of the Royal Audiencia of Santafé de Bogotá, where he died in office.
