= Celestino Martínez =

Venezuelan artist

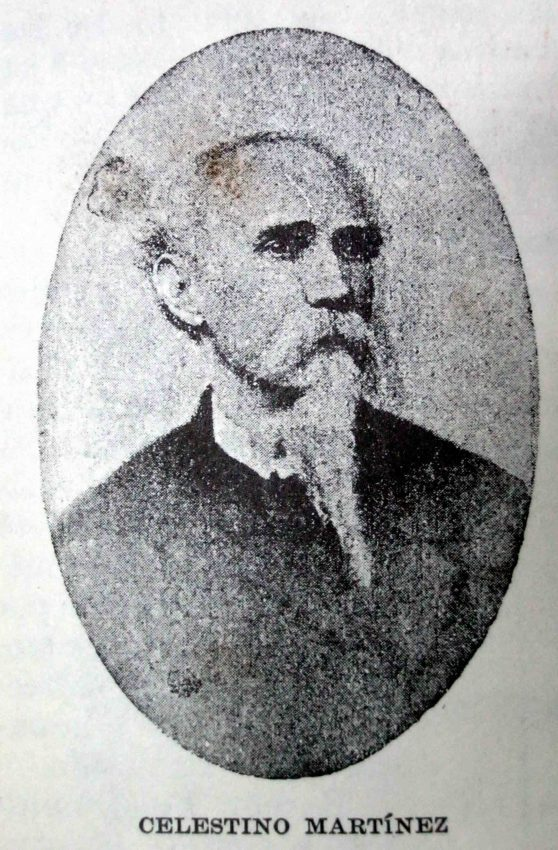
Celestino Martínez (date unknown)

Celestino Martínez Sánchez (19 May 1820, Caracas - 23 December 1885, Caracas) was a Venezuelan painter, lithographer, illustrator and photographer. He also spent part of his career working in Colombia.

== Biography ==
His father, Juan José Dionisio Martínez Alemán (1773-1847), was Secretary to the Supreme Court of Justice of Venezuela. He began his education in art with Juan Lovera in 1832. Later, he visited Europe, spending most of his time in Paris, where he studied the "Old Masters".

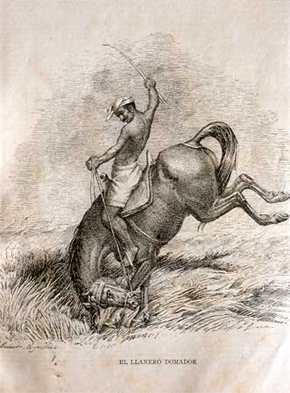
"El Llanero Domador" (The Plainsman Tamer), his most familiar image

In 1839, at the age of nineteen, he taught drawing classes at the "Sociedad Económica Amigos del País" (Economic Society of Friends of the Nation), founded by General José Antonio Páez. These courses lasted for less than a year, but he was able to become an instructor at the new "Escuela de Dibujo" (School of Drawing) He taught at several other institutions as well. Martín Tovar y Tovar was one of his most notable students.

In 1844, he and his younger brother, Gerónimo Martínez, were employed in the lithography workshop of Johann Heinrich Müller and Wilhelm Stapler, where they created images for the first illustrated book published in Venezuela;The Mysteries of Paris by Eugène Sue. When they had completed their work there, they decided to continue as lithographers; receiving awards at several major exhibitions. Celestino continued his painting during this time, producing a depiction of the "Baptism of Christ" for Caracas Cathedral. In 1846, he married Clara Lyon Sucre and they eventually had ten children.

In 1847, at the invitation of the Colombian writer, Manuel Ancízar, he went to Bogotá with his brother to establish a lithography workshop. The following year, they established their own art school, the Academia Martínez-Hermanos. Both worked as collaborators on Ancívar's journal, El Neoogranadino (the New Granadian). In 1853, he developed an interest in photography, so he travelled to Paris and learned to make paper negatives. He also bought photographic equipment from Charles Chevalier, who had designed lenses for one of the first daguerrotypes, and established a studio in Bogotá.

Briefly, from 1860 to 1861, he served as Venezuelan Consul in Bogotá, but was recalled to Caracas when General Páez returned to power. He continued his photographic work there, together with his former student, Tovar y Tovar and José Antonio Salas. Later, in 1867, he began exhibiting in photography expositions, including one organized by the pioneering photographer, Próspero Rey. In 1877, he was one of the co-founders of the "Academy of Drawing and Painting" at the National Institute of Fine Arts. In 1883, he was one of the judges at the "Exposición Nacional de Venezuela", together with Antonio José Carranza and others, celebrating the 100th anniversary of the birth of Simón Bolívar. Shortly before his death, he was appointed Inspector of Public Buildings for the Capital District.

His works may be seen at the National Art Gallery in Caracas and the Colombian National Museum.
