= Miguel Samper Agudelo =

Colombian lawyer, politician and writer (1825–1899)

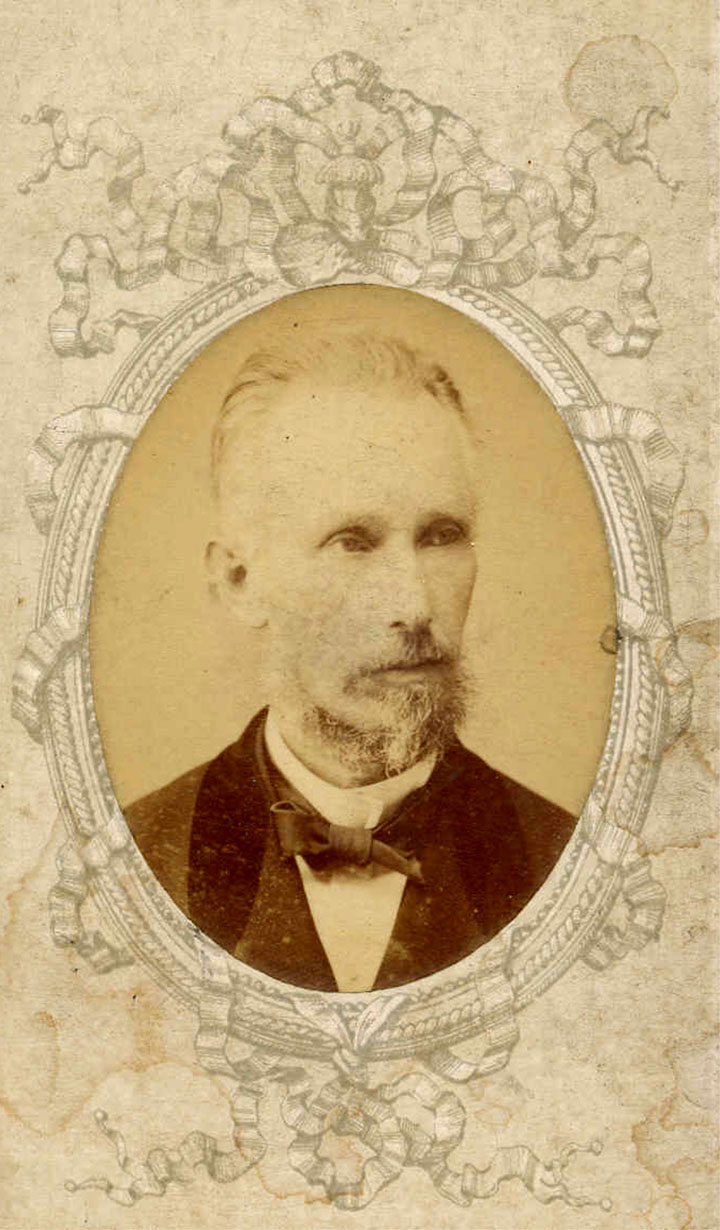
- Daguerreotype of Miguel Samper Agudelo.
- Born: 24 October 1825; Guaduas, Cundinamarca, Colombia
- Died: 16 March 1899 (aged 73); Anapoima, Cundinamarca, Colombia
- Resting place: Central Cemetery of Bogotá
- Education: College of Saint Bartholomew (JD, 1846)
- Occupations: Lawyer, politician
- Spouse: María Teresa Elena Brush y Domínguez (1851–1899)
- Children: Manuel Francisco Samper Brush; Santiago Samper Brush; María Samper Brush; José María Samper Brush; Margarita Samper Brush; Antonio Samper Brush; Dolores Samper Brush; Joaquín Samper Brush; Tomás María Samper Brush; Francisco Ricardo Samper Brush
- Relatives: José María Samper Agudelo (brother); Agripina Samper Agudelo (sister); Soledad Acosta Kemble (sister-in-law); Manuel Ancízar Basterra (brother-in-law); Bertilda Samper Acosta (niece)
- Writing career
- Language: Spanish
- Period: 1855—1899
- Genres: non-fiction, journalism
- Subjects: Politics and economy of Colombia
- Notable work: Escritos político-económicos

Miguel Samper Agudelo (24 October 1825 – 16 March 1899) was a Colombian lawyer, politician, and writer. In Colombian politics he distinguished himself as a proponent of abolitionism and economic reform, was elected Member of the Chamber of Representatives, and rose to prominence in the Liberal party ultimately being nominated by the Liberal Party as their candidate for the 1898 Colombian presidential election.

== Personal life ==
Miguel was born on 24 October 1825 in Guaduas, Cundinamarca to José María Samper Blanco and María Tomasa Agudelo y Tafur; the eight and youngest of their children. To of his siblings stand out: Agripina, who married Manuel Ancízar Basterra; and José María, who married Soledad Acosta Kemble; all of whom were writers in their own right. On 4 May 1851 Miguel married María Teresa Elena Brush y Domínguez, the American born daughter of an Englishman and his Neogranadine wife. Of this union were born ten children: Manuel Francisco, Santiago, María, José María, Margarita, Antonio, Dolores, Joaquín, Tomás María Canuto, and Francisco Ricardo.

An alumnus of the College of Saint Bartholomew in Bogotá, he graduated Juris Doctor in 1844 and became a Lawyer in 1846.

== Selected works ==
- Samper Agudelo, Miguel (1867). La miseria en Bogotá (PDF) (in Spanish). Bogotá: Imprenta de Gaitán. OCLC 23888011.
- — (1880). La protección: análisis económico y político de la República de Colombia en 1880 (PDF) (in Spanish). Bogotá: Imprenta de G.A. Núñez. OCLC 34268606.
- — (1880). Banco Nacional (in Spanish). Bogotá: Imprenta Gaitán. OCLC 22961931.
- —; Leroy-Beaulieu, Pierre Paul (1892). Regulación del sistema monetario (PDF) (in Spanish). Bogotá: Imprenta de "La Nación" y de Lleras. OCLC 43641935.
- — (1898). Escritos político-económicos (in Spanish). Bogotá: Imprenta de Eduardo Espinosa Guzmán. LCCN 15001269. OCLC 318202181.
- — (1884). Nuestras enfermedades politicas: voracidad fiscal de los estados (in Spanish). Bogotá: Imprenta de Vapor de Zalamea Hnos. OCLC 32144938.
- — (1898). Las reformas y el Cesarismo: artículos publicados en El Repertorio Colombiano (PDF) (in Spanish). Bogotá: Imprenta de "La Luz".
