= José María Samper =

Colombian lawyer, politician, and writer (1828–1888)

José María Samper Agudelo
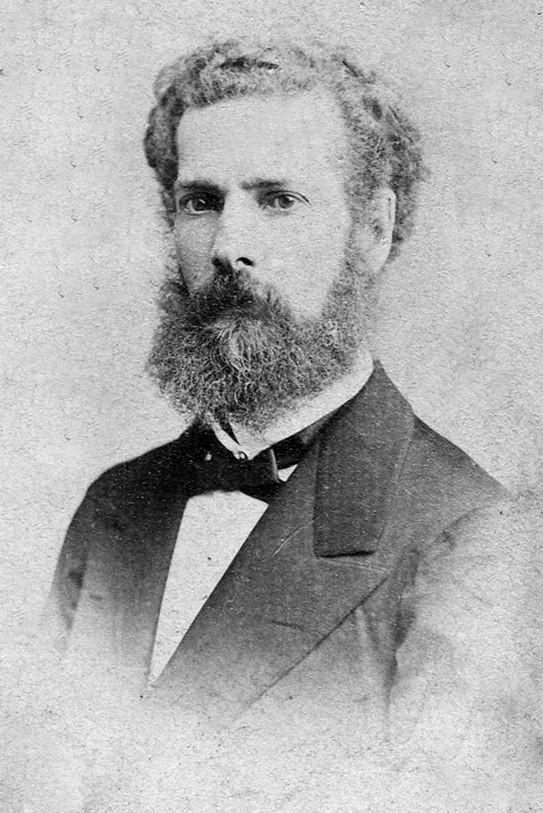
- Daguerreotype of José María Samper Agudelo
- Born: José María Balbino Venancio Samper Agudelo; 31 March 1828; Honda, Tolima, Gran Colombia
- Died: 22 July 1888 (aged 60); Anapoima, Cundinamarca, Colombia
- Resting place: Central Cemetery of Bogotá
- Education: University of Bogotá (JD, 1810)
- Occupations: Lawyer, journalist, politician
- Spouse(s): Elvira Levi Espina (1851-1852); Soledad Acosta Kemble (1855-1888)
- Children: María Josefa Samper Acosta; Carolina Samper Acosta; Bertilda Samper Acosta; Blanca Leonor Samper Acosta
- Relatives: Miguel Samper Agudelo (brother); Agripina Samper Agudelo (sister); Tomás Joaquín de Acosta y Pérez de Guzmán (father-in-father); Manuel Ancízar Basterra (brother-in-law)
- Writing career
- Language: Spanish
- Period: 1845—1888
- Genre: Prose
- Subjects: Travel literature, history of Colombia, politics of Colombia
- Movement: Costumbrismo

José María Balbino Venancio Samper Agudelo (31 March 1828 — 22 July 1888) was a Colombian lawyer, politician, and writer. In his writing he covered many genres including poetry, drama, comedy, novels, didactic works, biographies, travel books, and critical and historical essays. He collaborated in different periodicals of his time, was founder of La Revista Americana, and worked as managing editor of El Deber, and editor-in-chief of El Comercio. His early works were published while the Republic of New Granada still existed.

== Personal life ==
José María Balbino Venacio was born on 31 March 1828 to José María Samper Blanco and Tomasa Agudelo y Tafur, in Honda, present-day Tolima. Among his siblings, two stand out: Agripina, who was married to Manuel Ancízar Basterra, and his older brother Miguel, a businessman and politician, and great-grandfather of Ernesto Samper Pizano. He married Elvira Levi Espina in 1851, but she died soon after in 1852 leaving no children. On 5 May 1855 he married Soledad Acosta Kemble, a renowned writer and journalist, and together they had four daughters, Bertilda, who become a nun, and took up poetry like her parents, Carolina (b. 1857) and María Josefa (b. 1860), both of whom died in 1872 during a smallpox outbreak in Bogotá, and Blanca Leonor (b. 1862).

== Selected works ==
- Samper, José María (1853). Apuntamientos para la historia politica i social de la Nueva Granada [Writings For The Political And Social History of the New Granada] (in Spanish). Bogotá: Imprenta el Neo-Granadino. OCLC 9291198.
- Samper, José María (1855). Un alcalde a la antigua y dos primos a la moderna: Una comedia de costumbrismos nacionales [One Antiquated Mayor And Two Modern Cousins: A Comedy of National Mannerisms] (Play) (in Spanish). Bogotá: Editorial Minerva. OCLC 12143367.
- Samper, José María (1861). Ensayo sobre las revoluciones políticas y la condicion social de las repúblicas colombianas [Essay On The Political Revolutions And the Social Condition of the Colombian Republics] (Essay) (in Spanish). Paris: Imprenta de E. Thurnot. OCLC 9291189.
- Samper, José María (1862). Viajes de un colombiano en Europa, Volume 2 [Travels of a Colombian in Europe, Volume 2] (Travel journal) (in Spanish). Paris: Imprenta de E. Thunot. OCLC 12336584.
- Samper, José María (1866). Martin Flores (Novel) (in Spanish). Bogotá: Imprenta de Gaitan. OCLC 15058863.
- Samper, José María (1873). Los Partidos En Colombia: Estudio Histórico-Politíco [The Political Parties In Colombia: A Historic And Political Study] (in Spanish). Bogotá: Imprenta Echeverria Hermanos. OCLC 4038552.
