= Soledad Acosta =

Colombian writer and journalist (1833–1913)

Soledad Acosta Kemble
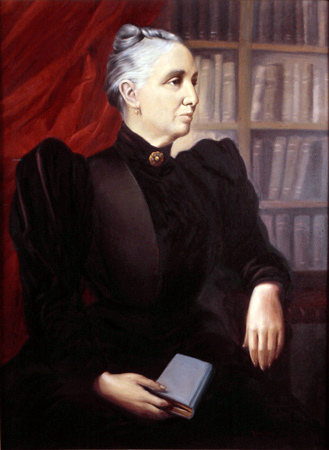
- Kemble, 1913 painting
- Born: 5 May 1833; Bogotá, Cundinamarca, Republic of New Granada
- Died: 17 March 1913 (aged 79); Bogotá, Cundinamarca, Colombia
- Resting place: Central Cemetery of Bogotá
- Occupations: Journalist, writer
- Spouse(s): José María Samper Agudelo (1855–88)
- Children: María Josefa Samper Acosta; Carolina Samper Acosta; Bertilda Samper Acosta; Blanca Leonor Samper Acosta
- Relatives: Tomás Joaquín de Acosta y Pérez de Guzmán (father); Miguel Samper Agudelo (brother-in-law); Agripina Samper Agudelo (sister-in-law)
- Writing career
- Language: Spanish
- Movement: Costumbrismo

Soledad Acosta Kemble (5 May 1833 – 17 March 1913) was a Colombian writer and journalist. A sophisticated, well-travelled, and social woman, she received a much higher and better rounded education than most women of her time and country, and enjoyed a high standing in society, not only for her family background, but for her own literary endeavours. She collaborated in various newspapers including El Comercio, El Deber, and Revista Americana, among other periodicals. Using her writings, she was a feminist well ahead of her time, she lobbied for equal education for women, and wrote on various topics pertaining to female participation in society and family, encouraging others to become proactive in the workforce and in the restoration of society.

== Personal life ==
Soledad was born on 5 May 1833, to Tomás Joaquín de Acosta y Pérez de Guzmán, and Caroline Kemble Rowe in Bogotá. Her father was a native of Guaduas, New Kingdom of Granada, the son of Spanish settlers, he was a scientist, diplomat and general; her mother, a native of Kingston, Jamaica, was the daughter of Gideon Kemble, an American Scotsman and Collector of the Port of Kingston, and his wife Tomasa (née Rowe).

On 5 May 1855 she married José María Samper Agudelo, a renowned writer and journalist. Together they had four daughters: Bertilda, who became a nun, and took up poetry like her parents; Carolina (b. 1857) and María Josefa (b. 1860), both of whom died in 1872 during a smallpox outbreak in Bogotá; and Blanca Leonor (b. 1862).

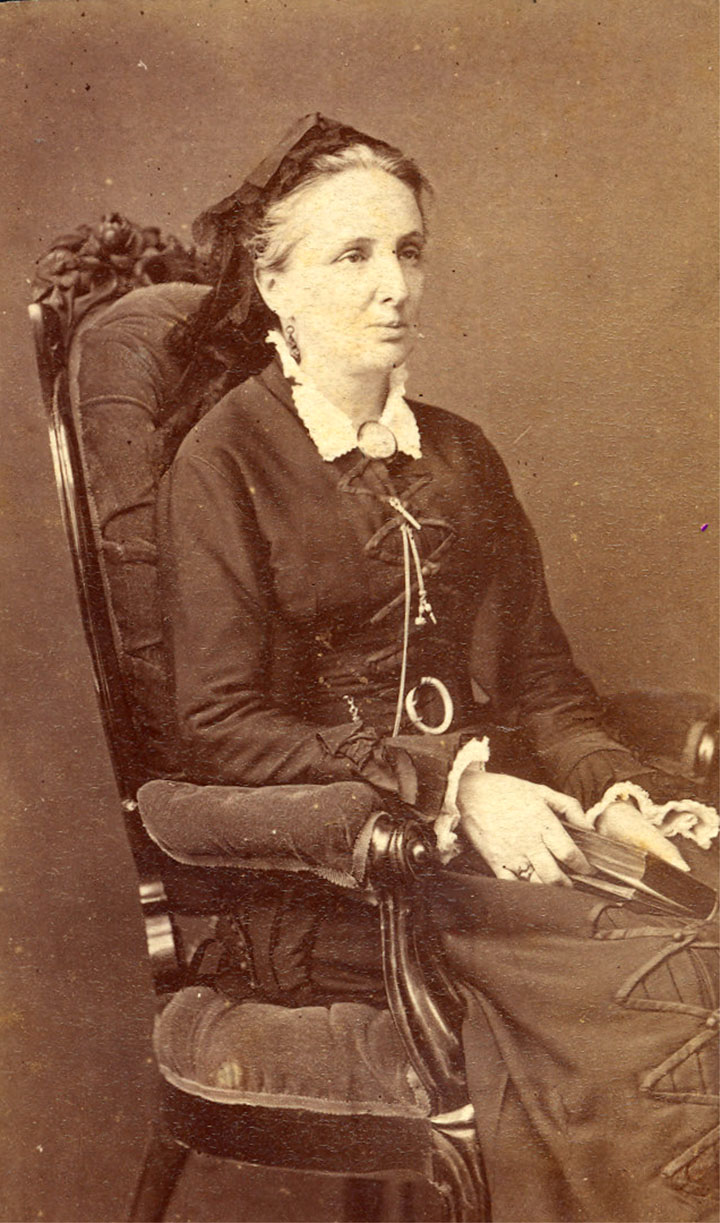
Daguerreotype of Soledad Acosta c 1880

== Selected works ==
- Acosta, Soledad (1867). Dolores: Scenes from a Woman's Life / Dolores: Cuadros de la vida de una mujer (in English and Spanish). Cita Press. ISBN 978-1-961368-24-8.
- Acosta, Soledad (1869). Novelas y Cuadros de la Vida Suramericana [Novels and Portraits of South American Life] (in Spanish). Ghent, Belgium: Eugene Vanderhaeghen. ISBN 978-987-1136-45-2. OCLC 7568301.
- Acosta, Soledad (1886). Los Piratas En Cartagena [Pirates in Cartagena] (in Spanish). Bogotá, Colombia: La Luz. OCLC 228041823.
- Acosta, Samper (1888) [1876]. Una Holandesa En America [A Dutch Woman in America] (in Spanish). Willemstad, Curaçao: A. Betancourt. OCLC 15266567.
- Acosta, Soledad (1895). La Mujer En La Sociedad Moderna [The Woman in Modern Society] (in Spanish). Paris, France: Garnier. OCLC 1547187.
- Acosta, Soledad (1901). Biografía del general Joaquín Acosta: prócer de la independencia, historiador, geógrafo, hombre científico y filántropo [Biography of General Joaquín Acosta: Precursor of the Independence, Historian, Geographer, Man of Science and Philanthropist] (in Spanish). Bogotá, Colombia: Camacho Roldán & Tamayo. OCLC 7706472.
