= Almaguer, Cauca =

Almaguer
- Municipality and town
- Flag Coat of arms

- Location of the municipality and town of Almaguer in the Cauca Department of Colombia.

- Location in Colombia
- Coordinates: 1°55′N 76°52′W
- Country: Colombia
- Department: Cauca Department

Population (Census 2018)
  - Total: 16,523
- Time zone: UTC-5 (Colombia Standard Time)
- Climate: Cfb

Almaguer (Spanish pronunciation: [almaˈɣeɾ]) is a town and municipality in the Cauca Department, Colombia.

== History and geography ==
Founded in 1551 by Vasco de Guzmán and Alonso de Fuenmayor, it was named after the birthplace of Francisco Briceño, the acting governor of Popayán, who granted Alonso de Fuenmayor the license to found the city. Briceño was originally from Corral de Almaguer in La Mancha, Toledo, Spain.

The municipality covers an area of 520 km^{2} and has a population of 21,300. The population is primarily engaged in agriculture.

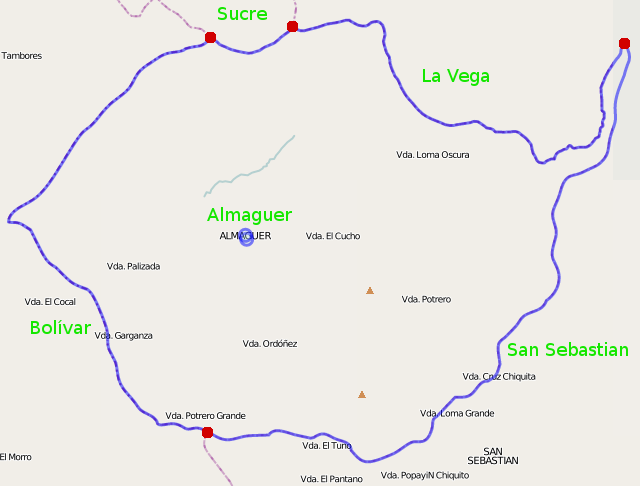
Municipalities bordering Cauca; boundary intersections indicated in red.

== Notable residents ==
- Manuel María Paz Delgado
