= Agripina Samper Agudelo =

Colombian poet (1833–1892)

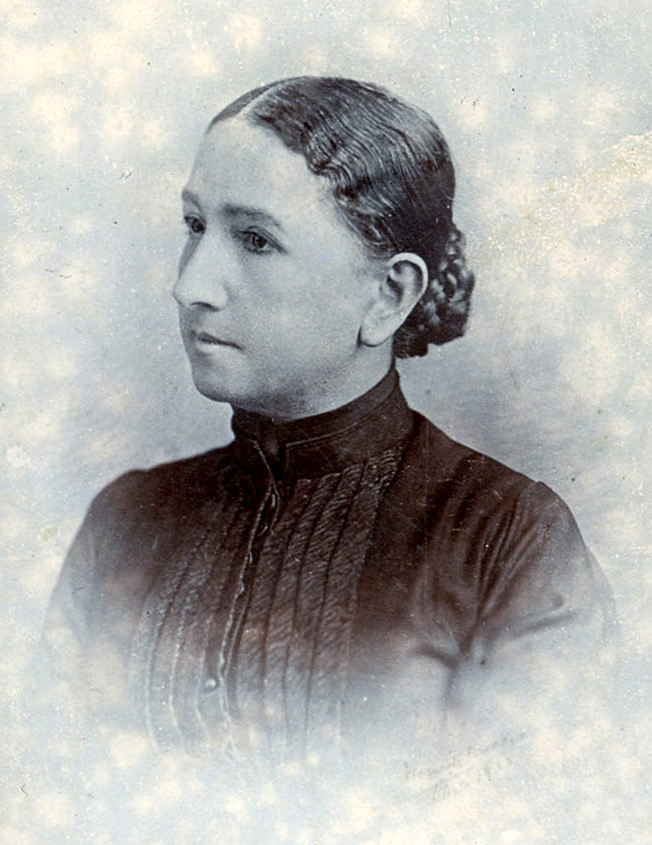
- Born: Agripina Casimira de los Dolores Samper Agudelo; 4 March 1833; Honda, Cundinamarca, New Granada
- Died: 22 April 1892 (aged 59); Paris, France
- Spouse: Manuel Ancízar Basterra (m. 1857–1882)
- Children: Roberto Ancízar Samper; Pablo Ancízar Samper; Inés Ancízar Samper; Jorge Ancízar Samper; Manuel Ancízar Samper
- Relatives: José María Samper Agudelo (brother); Miguel Samper Agudelo (brother); Soledad Acosta Kemble (sister-in-law); Bertilda Samper Acosta (niece)
- Writing career
- Pen name: Pía Rigán
- Language: Spanish
- Period: 1853—1892
- Genre: Poetry
- Literary movement: Costumbrismo

Agripina Casimira de los Dolores Samper Agudelo (4 March 1833 — 22 April 1892) was a Colombian poet. Having a literary family, she received an education not easily accessible to women of her time and country. She wrote prose and poetry under the pseudonym "Pía-Rigán", an anagram of her given name. Her work remained unpublished during her lifetime and was only anthologized and published posthumously.

== Personal life ==
Born Agripina Casimira de los Dolores on 4 March 1833 in the city of Honda, then part of the Department of Cundinamarca, her parents were José María Samper Blanco and María Tomasa Agudelo y Tafur, she was their only daughter and seventh out of the eight children born to José María and María Tomasa. Two of her siblings stand out: José María, who married Soledad Acosta Kemble, both were writers and journalists in their own right; and Miguel, writer and prominent politician. On 4 July 1857 she married Manuel Ancízar Basterra, a scientist and writer, and out this marriage were born Roberto, Pablo, Inés, Jorge, and Manuel. When she widowed in 1882, she moved with her children to Paris, where she died on 22 April 1892.

== Selected works ==
- Samper, José María; Samper, Agripina (1860). "Ensayos Poéticos de Pía-Rigán" [Poetic Essays of Pía-Rigán]. Ecos de los Andes [Echos of the Andes] (in Spanish). Paris: E. Thunot. OCLC 12355033.
- Añez, Julio. Parnaso Colombiano: Colección de Poesías Escogidas [Colombian Parnassus: Selected Poetry of Agripina Samper] (PDF) (in Spanish). Luis Ángel Arango Library.
