= Joaquín Acosta =

Colombian explorer, historian (1800–1852)

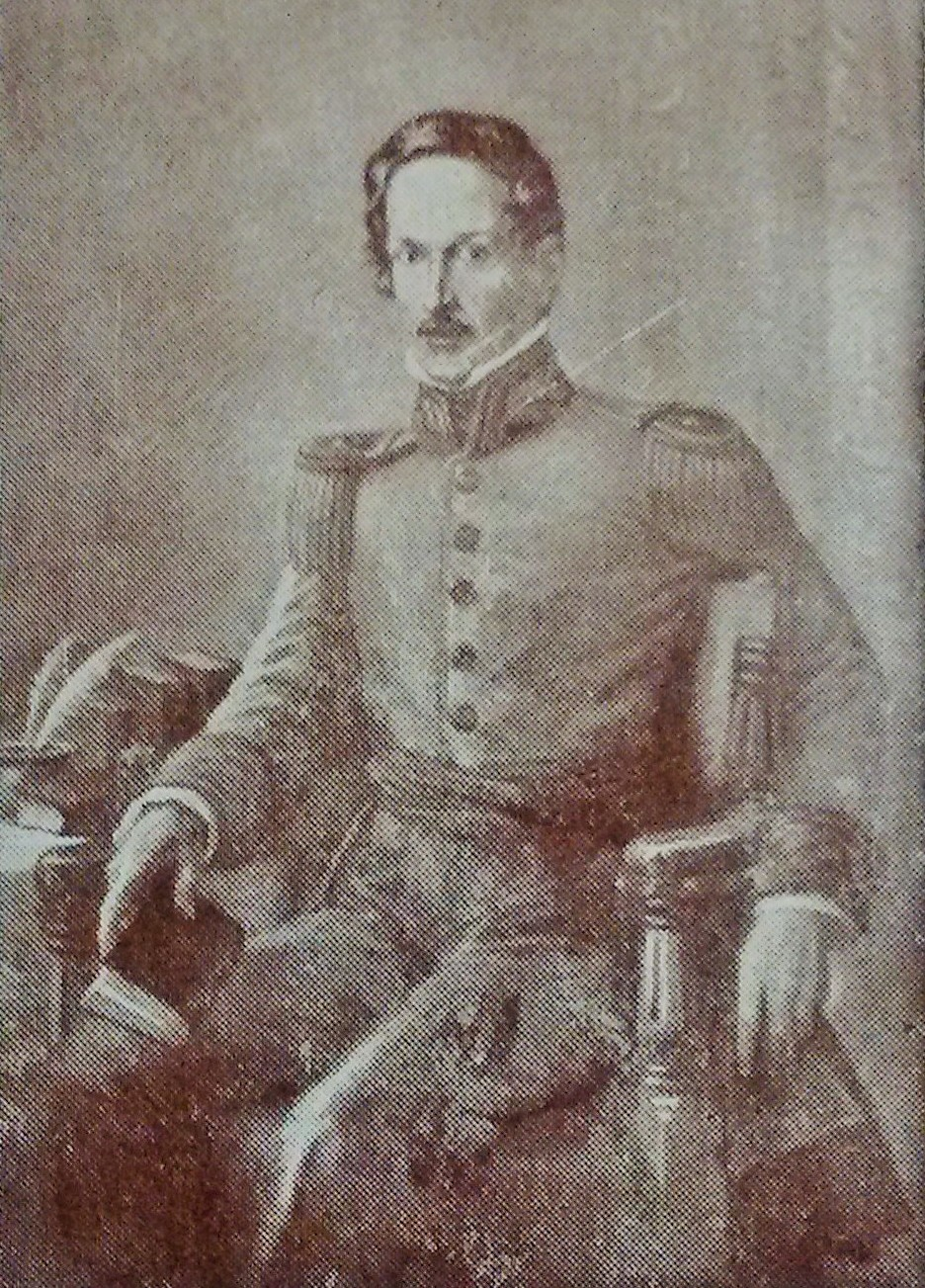
- Born: 29 December 1800; Guaduas, Cundinamarca, Viceroyalty of the New Granada
- Died: 21 February 1852 (aged 51); Guaduas, Cundinamarca, Republic of New Granada
- Children: Soledad Acosta de Samper (daughter)
- Scientific career
- Fields: Geologist

Muisca numerals as noted by Acosta

Tomás Joaquín de Acosta y Pérez de Guzmán (December 29, 1800 – February 21, 1852) was a Colombian explorer, historian, chorographer, and geologist.

A native of Colombia in South America, he served in the Colombian army and in 1834 attempted a scientific survey of the territory between Socorro and the Magdalena River. Seven years later he explored western Colombia from Antioquia to Anserma studying its topography, its natural history and the traces of its aboriginal inhabitants.

In 1845 he went to Spain to examine such documentary material concerning Colombia and its colonial history as was then accessible, and three years later he published his Compendio, a work on the discovery and colonization of New Granada (Colombia). The map accompanying this work, now out of date, was very fair for the time, and the work itself is still valuable for its abundant bibliographic references and biographic notes. What he says in it of the writings of Gonzalo Jiménez de Quesada the conqueror of New Granada, is very incomplete and in many ways erroneous, but his biographies remain a guide to the student of Spanish-American history. One year after the Compendio, another work called Semenario appeared at Paris, embodying the botanical papers of Francisco José de Caldas.

== Personal life ==
He was the son of Josef Acosta and Soledad Pérez de Guzman and married Caroline Kemble Rowe. His daughter Soledad Acosta de Samper, born May 5, 1833, became a historian and writer and married José María Samper, Colombian lawyer, writer and politician.

== Selected works ==
- Acosta, Joaquín (1847). Geología de la Nueva Granada [Geology of New Granada]. Paris.
- Acosta, Joaquín (1848). Compendio histórico del descubrimiento y colonización de la Nueva Granada en el siglo décimo sexto [Historical overview of discovery and colonization of New Granada in the sixteenth century]. Paris: Beau Press. OCLC 23030434.
- Boussingault, Jean-Baptiste; Roulin, François Désiré (1849). Viajes científicos a los Andes ecuatoriales: ó Coleccion de memorias sobre física, química é historia natural de la Nueva Granada, Ecuador y Venezuela [Scientific travels to the equatorial Andes: or Collection of memoirs on physical, chemical and natural history of New Granada, Ecuador and Venezuela] (Translation). Translated by Joaquín Acosta. Paris: Lasserre. OCLC 79145817.
