= Antonio José Carranza =

Venezuelan painter

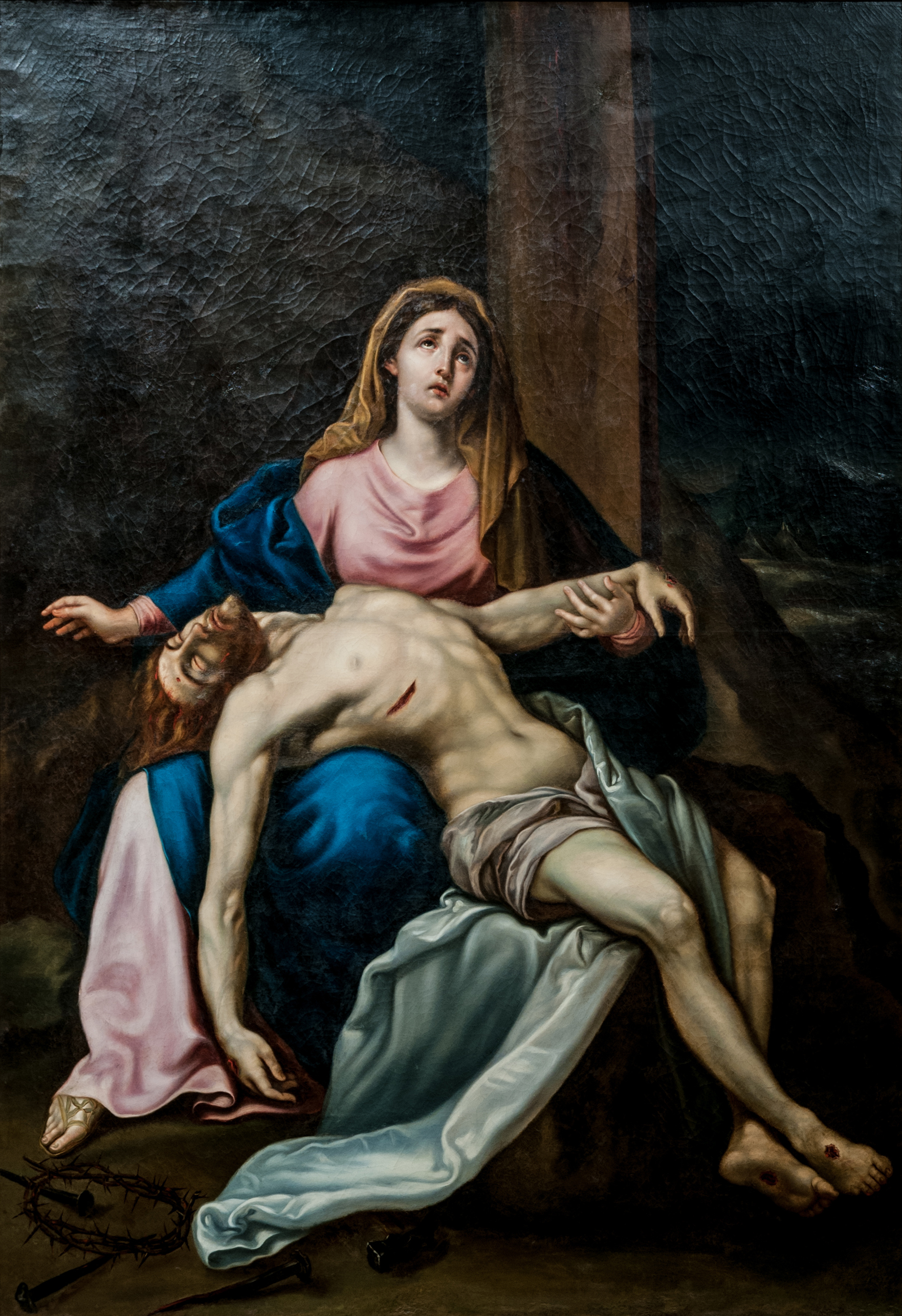
Pietà

Antonio José Carranza Goicochea (12 June 1817, Caracas - 31 March 1893, Caracas) was a Venezuelan painter.

== Biography ==
His father, Pedro Donoso Carranza, was a merchant pilot from Cádiz. He began by studying law at the Central University of Venezuela, but soon developed an interest in music and drawing; especially the latter. In pursuit of that interest, he enrolled at the School of Drawing, where he studied with Joaquín Sosa. When Sosa died, Carranza was chosen to take his place. Shortly after, he was appointed a preceptor at the Normal School.

From 1844, he taught at several institutions. In 1849, he replaced Carmelo Fernández in the drawing department at the Academy of Mathematics, when political issues forced Fernández to leave the country. He also obtained a position as Director at the School of Fine Arts. When the Colegio de Ingenieros de Venezuela was created in 1860, he taught topographic drawing there. During this time, he also contributed illustrations to some periodicals.

In 1877, he was appointed President of the Academy of Drawing and Painting at the National Institute of Fine Arts. At the "Exposición Nacional de Venezuela" in 1883, celebrating the 100th anniversary of the birth of Simón Bolívar, he was one of the panel of judges, which also included Celestino Martínez.

In 1850, he married Felicia Rojas Espaillat: sister of the writer and historian, Arístides Rojas. They had six children; three boys and three girls.

Some of his best known works were portraits, from life and posthumous; notably those of José Cortés de Madariaga, Francisco Salias, Juan Germán Roscio, José Gregorio Monagas and José Tadeo Monagas.

== Sources ==
- Biography @ Venezuela e Historia
