= Antonio José Ruiz de Padrón =

Spanish politician and Catholic priest

José Antonio Ruiz de Padron (1757–1823) was a noted Spanish politician and Catholic priest. He was a critic of the Inquisition and promoter of a more enlightened Catholic faith. In 1785 he went to Pennsylvania and met and debated with George Washington and Benjamin Franklin. In November 2012, he was awarded the Distinguished Honorary Favorite Son of the Island of La Gomera.
