= Carmelo Fernández =

Venezuelan engineer, soldier, cartoonist, lithographer and watercolorist

- Carmelo Fernández Páez
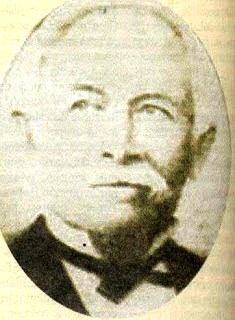
- Born: Carmelo Fernández Páez; June 30, 1809; Spain; Guama, Yaracuy, Captaincy General of Venezuela, Spanish Empire
- Died: February 9, 1887 (aged 77); Caracas, Venezuela
- Education: Studied with Capt. Lessabe (Caracas), Mariano Velázquez de la Cadena (New York)
- Known for: Drawing, watercolor, lithography, cartography
- Notable work: Atlas físico y político de Venezuela (1840), illustrations for the Comisión Corográfica, portrait of Simón Bolívar (1873)
- Style: Miniature, topographical art, historical scenes
- Movement: Costumbrismo, early Venezuelan nationalism
- Parents: José María Fernández (father); Luisa Páez (mother)
- Relatives: José Antonio Páez (uncle)
- Elected: Director of the Institute of Fine Arts, Caracas

Carmelo Fernández Páez (1809-1887) was a Venezuelan engineer, soldier, cartoonist, lithographer and watercolorist. He was born in the town of Guama, Yaracuy State, on June 30, 1809, and died in Caracas on February 9, 1887.

== Biography ==
His parents were José María Fernández and Luisa Páez, sister of general José Antonio Páez. As the nephew of a General, he became familiar with the events and personalities of the Spanish American wars of independence at an early age. From 1821 to 1823, he studied drawing and watercolors at a studio operated by a retired French artillery captain named Lessabe (or Lasabe) in Caracas. He then went to New York City, where he continued his education with Mariano Velazquez de la Cadena and others. When he returned to Venezuela in 1827, he studied mathematics and topographical drawing at the Army Engineering Command in Puerto Cabello, and was later stationed in Bogotá and Cartagena. During this period he participated in the punitive expedition under Daniel Florence O'Leary that went to Antioquia to suppress the revolt of General José María Córdova against the dictatorship of Simón Bolívar.

After the breakup of Gran Colombia, he was invited by the Italian geographer Agustín Codazzi to participate in creating a survey map of Venezuela. This work lasted from 1833 to 1839, during which time he made miniatures and engravings to include with the maps. He went to Paris with Codazzi in 1840 to oversee the printing of the maps by Thierry Frères, a well-known lithography firm, where Codazzi published the Atlas físico y político de la República de Venezuela. On the same trip, he developed some of the drawings for the Resumen de la historia de Venezuela by Rafael María Baralt and Ramón Díaz.

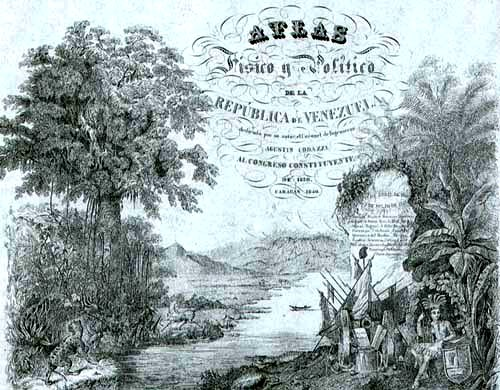
Cover of the "Physical and Political Atlas of Venezuela", drawn by Fernández. (1840)

In 1842, the Venezuelan government appointed a commission to repatriate the remains of Simón Bolívar from Santa Marta, an event that Fernandez recorded with about twenty drawings. Several of them were lithographed by the firm of Aagard, Müller and Stapler in 1844.

Due to the strong enmity between his uncle, the General, and José Tadeo Monagas, the General's friends and family were persecuted so Fernández had to go into exile in 1849, to New Granada. In 1850, upon the recommendation of Codazzi, he was appointed to the "Comisión Corográfica", where he provided illustrations for descriptions written by the historian Manuel Ancízar. He was, according to critics, the most qualified of the three painters who participated in the commission because he combined a skill for painting miniatures with a knowledge of topography. The prints he made during the project numbered about thirty, and are divided thematically into landscapes of natural phenomena, sites of historical and archaeological significance, roads, ethnic groups and customs. He resigned from this position in 1852, due to disagreements with the other members, and returned to Venezuela.

Shortly after, he traveled to France to perfect his skills. He stayed there for a few years, then came back to Caracas to take an appointment as Director of the Institute of Fine Arts, a position he held until his death in 1887. Between 1870 and 1873, he created a series of tempera landscapes of Zulia State. He also decorated the Paéz's home in Valencia as well as designing the "Plaza de Bolívar" in Maracaibo and planning restorative work on Solano Castle in Puerto Cabello.

His most famous work is his portrait of Bolivar, painted in 1873 and later used on several denominations of the Venezuelan Bolívar banknote.

== Selected drawings and paintings ==
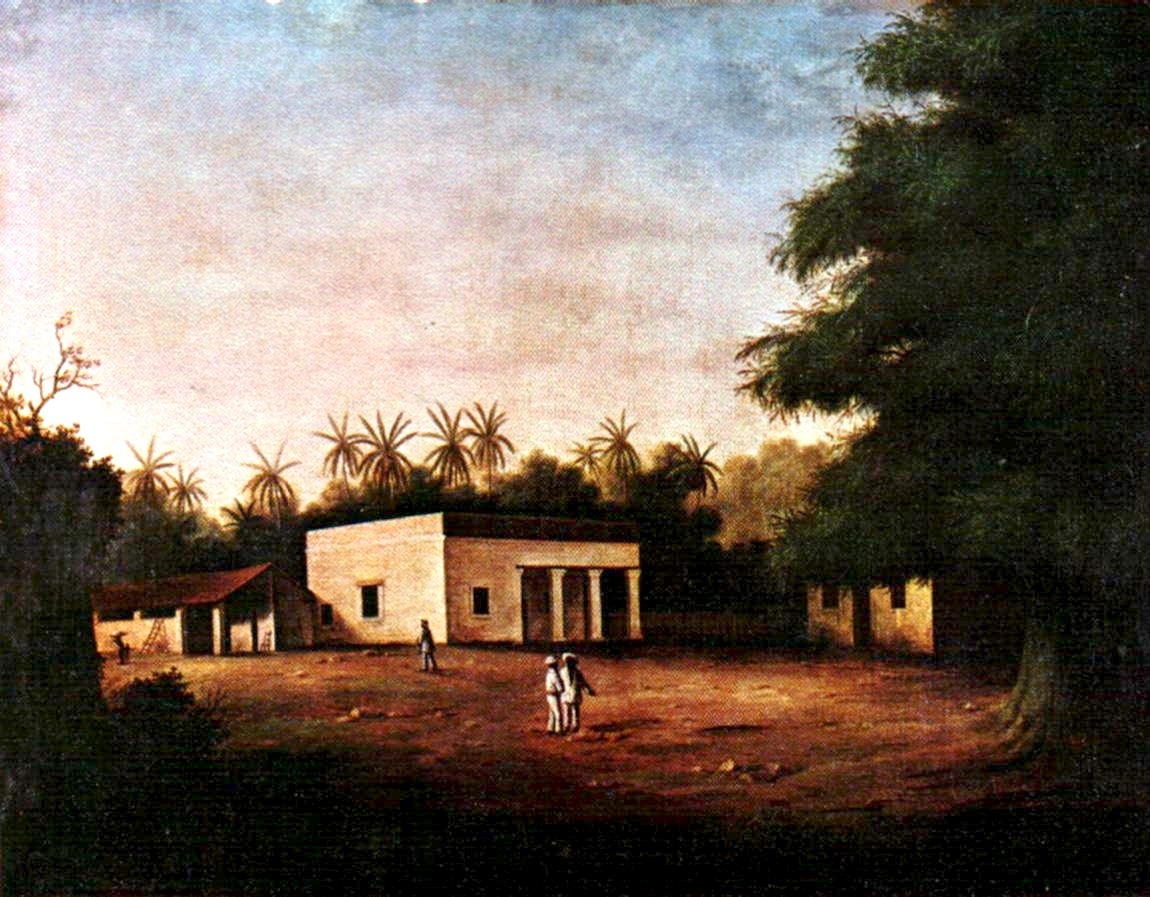
San Pedro Alejandrino Farm. 1848. Oil on canvas

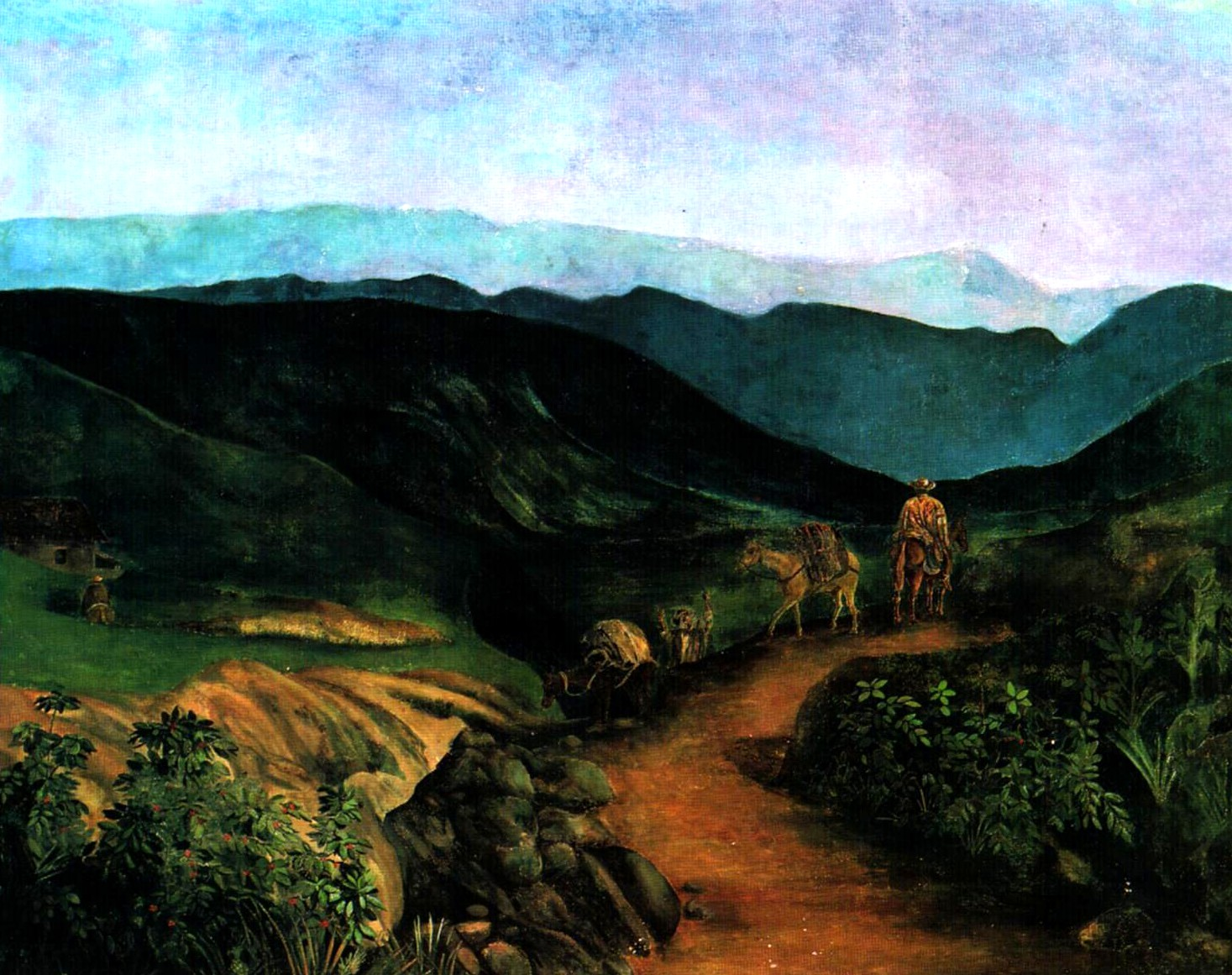
The Andes. Tempera on paper. 180 x 143 cm., collection of the government of Zulia

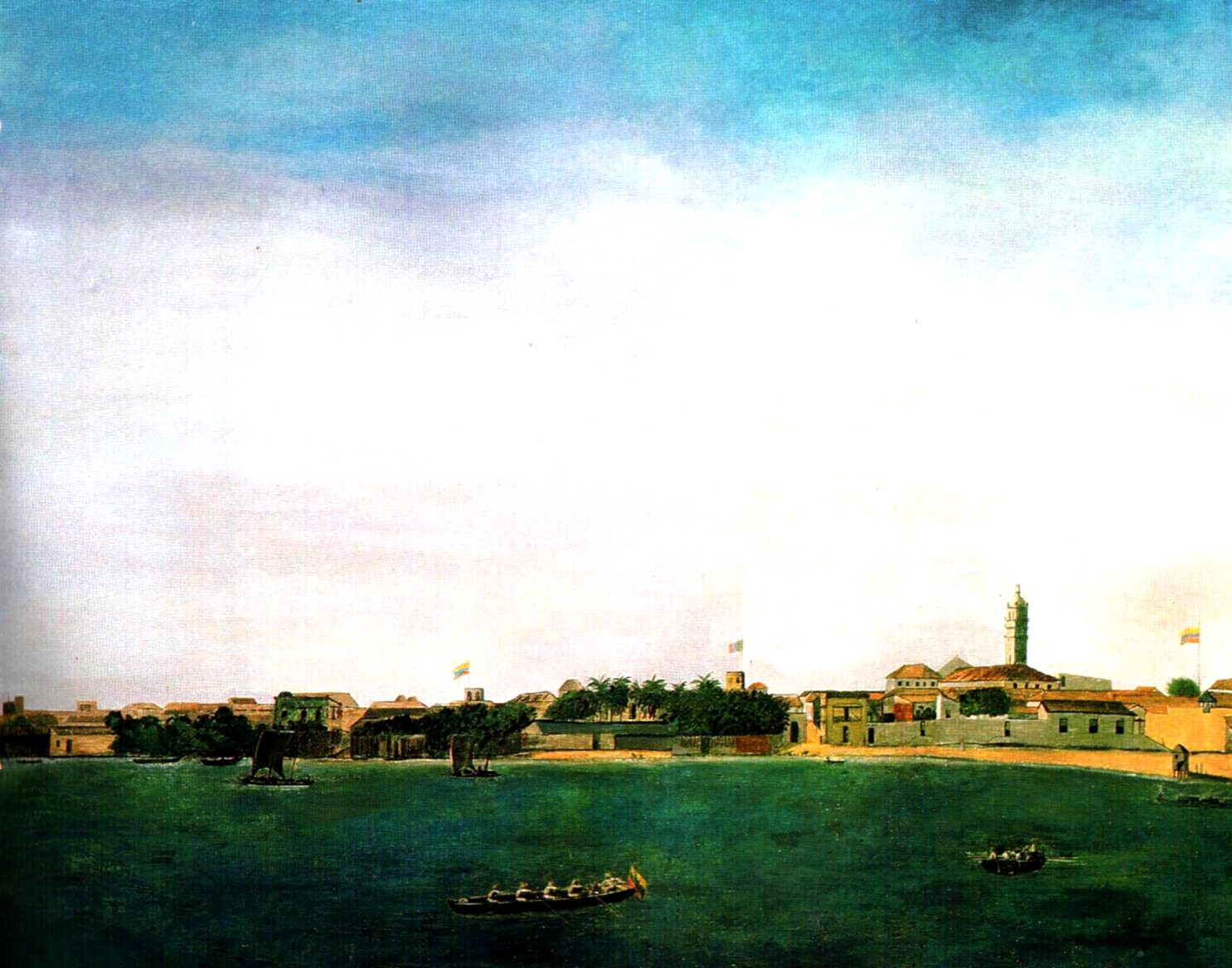
The Lake. Tempera on paper. 180 x 143 cm., collection of the government of Zulia

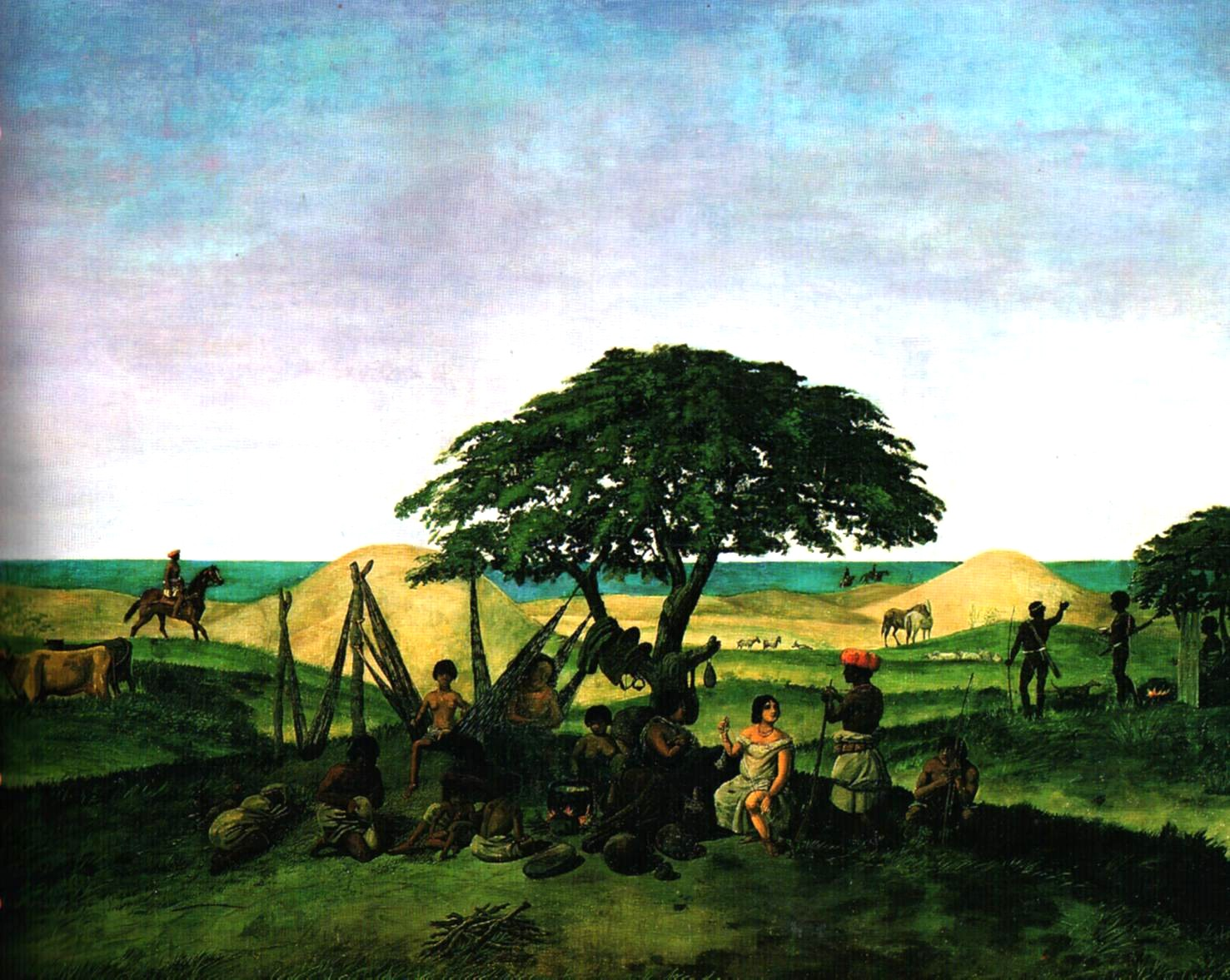
Peasant Encampment. 180 x 143 cm., collection of the government of Zulia

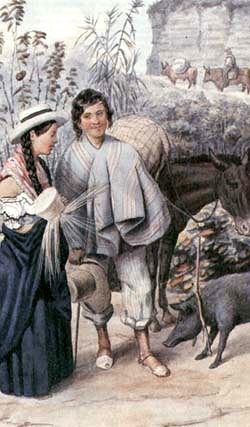
Muleteer and Hat Weaver in Vélez. 1850. watercolor. National Library of Colombia

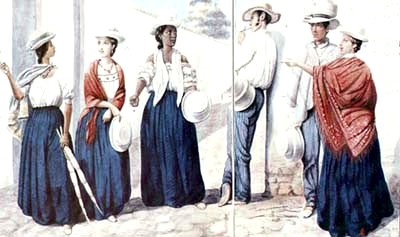
Palm-Hat Weavers and Sellers in Bucaramanga. 1850. watercolor. National Library of Colombia

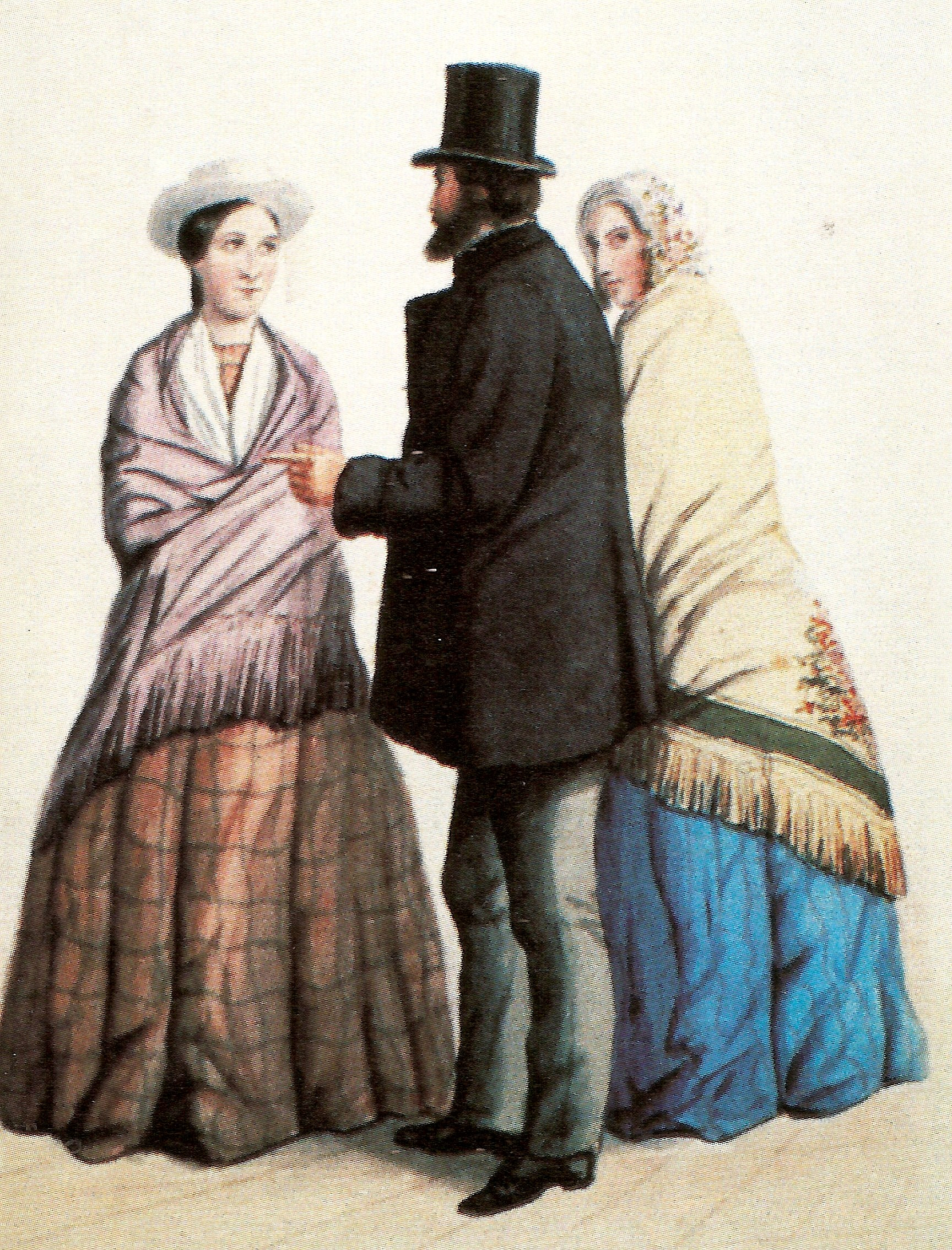
Notables of the Capital. 1851. watercolor. National Library of Colombia

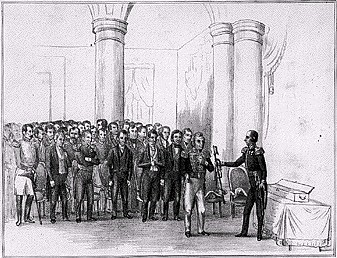
Páez Receives the Sword Granted to Him by the Nation. 1843. Lithograph on paper. Collection of the John Boulton Foundation, Caracas
