= Manuel Ancízar =

Colombian lawyer, writer, and journalist (1812–1882)

Manuel Ancízar Basterra
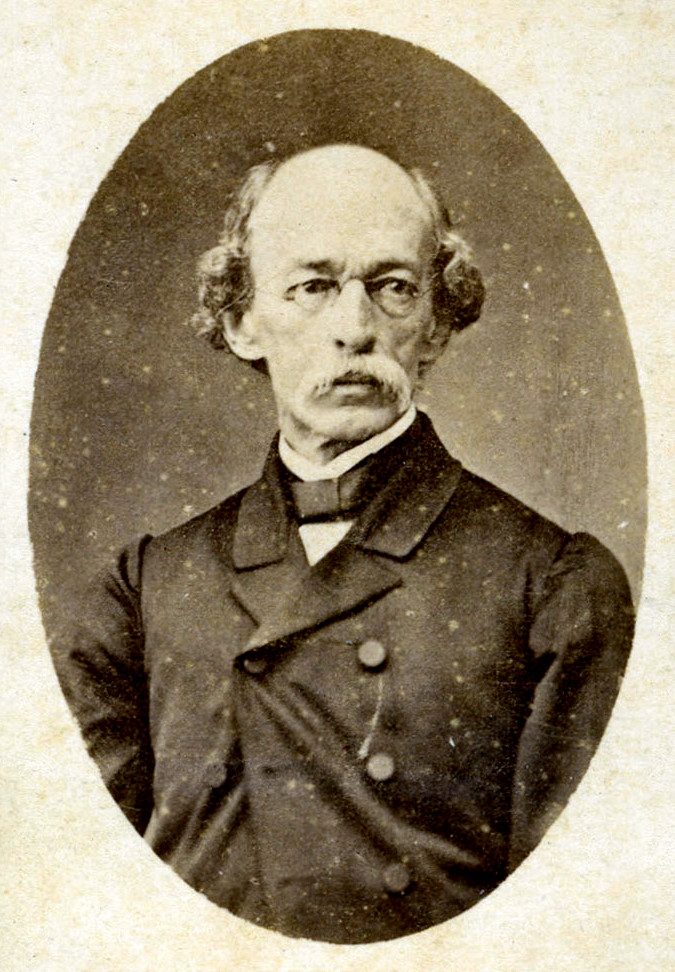

4th Secretary of Foreign Affairs of the Granadine Confederation
- In office 23 November 1861 – 1 December 1862
- President: Tomás Cipriano de Mosquera y Arboleda
- Preceded by: José María Rojas Garrido
- Succeeded by: José María Rojas Garrido

2nd Envoy Extraordinary and Minister Plenipotentiary of Colombia to Venezuela
- In office 1846–1846
- President: Tomás Cipriano de Mosquera y Arboleda
- Preceded by: Lino de Pombo O'Donell
- Succeeded by: Antonio María Pradilla Rueda

Personal details
- Born: Manuel Esteban Ancízar Basterra; 25 December 1812 Bogotá, Cundinamarca
- Died: 21 March 1882 (aged 69) Bogotá, Cundinamarca, United States of Colombia
- Resting place: Central Cemetery of Bogotá
- Party: Liberal
- Spouse(s): Agripina Samper Agudelo (1857—1882)
- Children: Roberto Ancízar Samper; Pablo Ancízar Samper; Inés Ancízar Samper; Jorge Ancízar Samper; Manuel Ancízar Samper
- Relatives: José María Samper Agudelo (brother-in-law); Miguel Samper Agudelo (brother-in-law)
- Education: University of Havana
- Profession: Lawyer

Manuel Ancízar
- Writing career
- Pen name: Alpha
- Language: Spanish
- Period: 1845—1882
- Genres: non-fiction, journalism
- Subjects: Philosophy; Geography, ethnography, and culture of Colombia
- Notable work: Peregrinación del Alpha por las provincias del norte de La Nueva Granada

Manuel Esteban Ancízar Basterra (25 December 1812 – 21 May 1882) was a Colombian lawyer, writer, and journalist. He founded a publishing house and a newspaper before joining the Chorographic Commission in 1850. He also served as the 4th Secretary of Foreign Affairs of the Granadine Confederation, and as the first president of the National University of Colombia.

== Personal life ==
Manuel Esteban was born on 25 December 1812 in Fontibon, Bogotá to José Francisco Ancízar y Zabaleta, Spaniard native of Navarre, and Juana Bernarda Basterra y Abaurrea, Spaniard native of Biscay. In 1819 his father, who had served as Corregidor of Zipaquirá under the Viceroy of New Granada, Juan José de Sámano y Uribarri; during the time of the Reconquista, was forced to flee the capital when the Spanish forces fell at the Battle of Boyacá and the victorious forces of General Simón Bolívar entered the capital. The family arrived in Cartagena de Indias, three of Manuel's siblings died in the arduous journey; in 1821 they had to flee again when this Spanish bastion fell to the forces of Admiral José Prudencio Padilla López. The Ancízar Basterra family landed this time in Cuba, a safe Spanish colony, where they remained under much impoverished circumstances as refugees; his mother and his only remaining sibling died few years after. In 1832 he graduated from the University of Saint Jerome in Civil Law, and two years later received his degree in Canon Law. On 4 July 1857 he married Agripina Samper Agudelo, sister of José María and Miguel Samper Agudelo, both writers and prominent politicians in Colombia; together they had five children: Roberto, Pablo, Inés, Jorge, and Manuel.

== Selected works ==
- Ancízar, Manuel (1851) [1845]. Lecciones de psicología y moral (in Spanish). Bogotá: Neo-Granadino. OCLC 6559317.
- — (1853). Peregrinación de Alpha por las provincias del norte de la Nueva Granada, en 1850 i 51 (in Spanish). Bogotá: Echeverria Hermanos. OCLC 3043000.
