= Agostino Codazzi =

Italo-Venezuelan soldier, scientist, geographer, cartographer, and governor

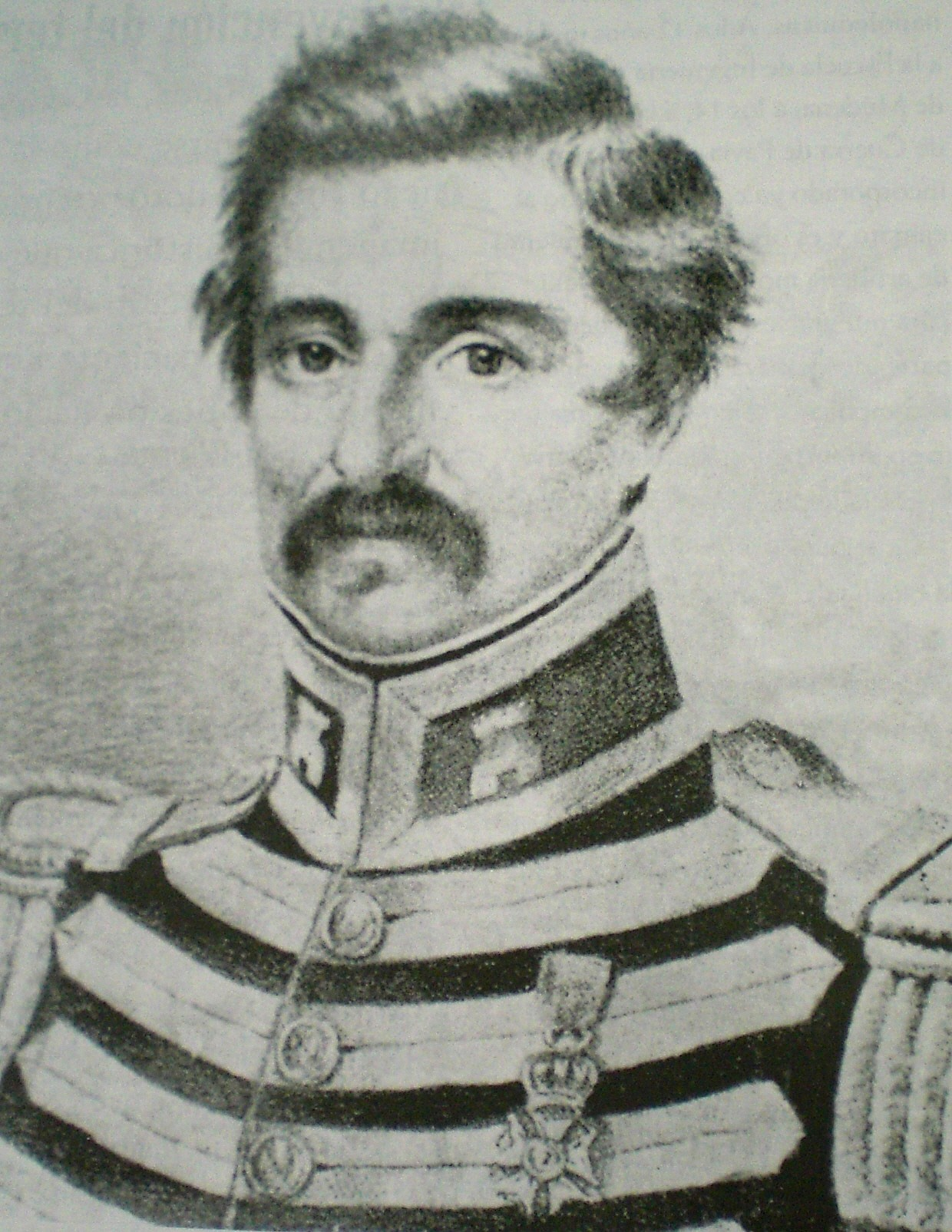
- Born: Giovanni Battista Agostino Codazzi; 12 July 1793; Lugo, Papal States
- Died: 7 February 1859 (aged 65); Espíritu Santo, Granadine Confederation
- Other names: Agustín Codazzi
- Occupations: Explorer, engineer, geographer, cartographer, ethnographer, naturalist, governor, soldier
- Notable work: Atlas Físico y Político de la República de Venezuela (1840)

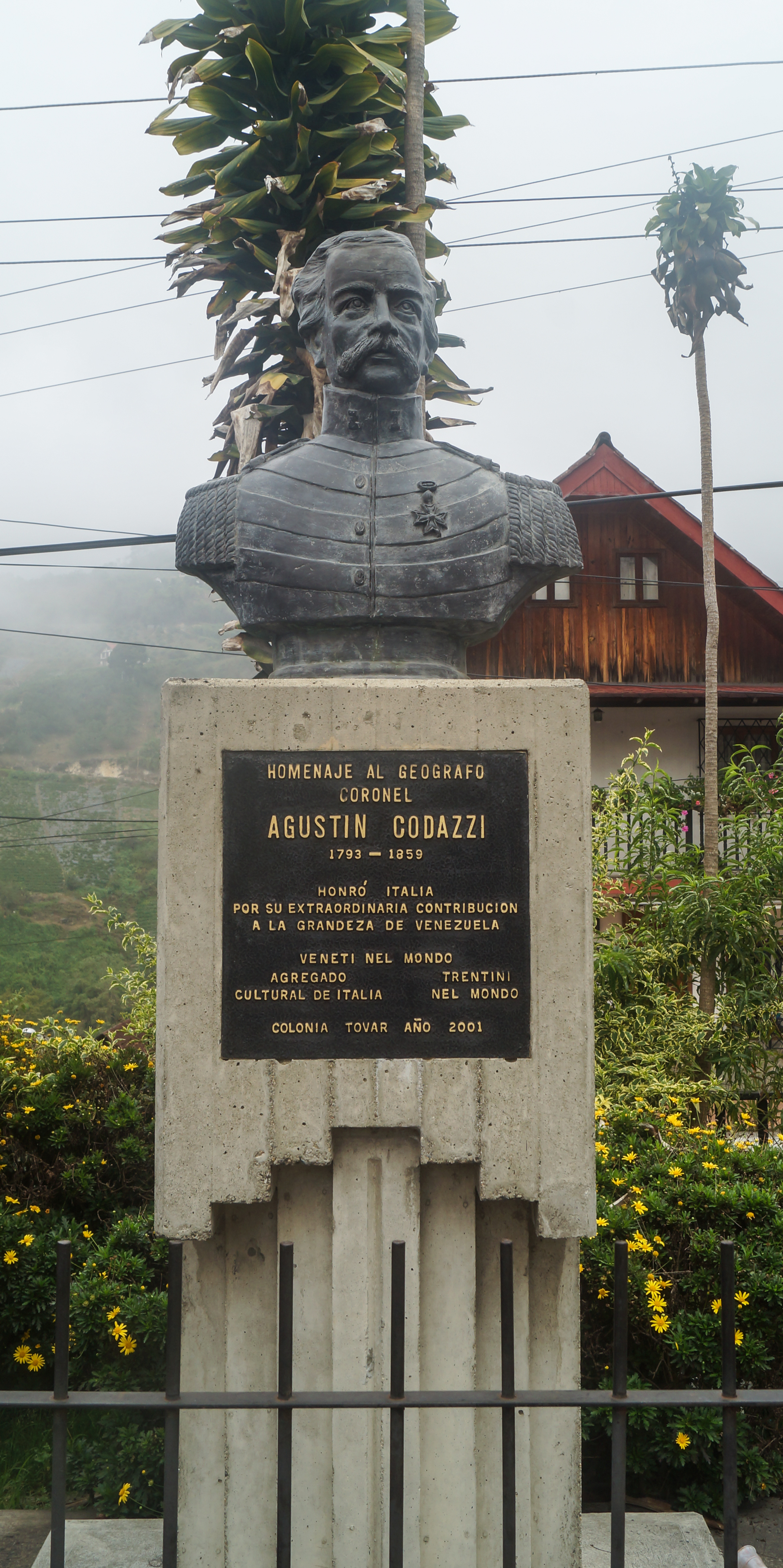
Agostino Codazzi monument (Colonia Tovar)

Giovanni Battista Agostino Codazzi (Italian: [aɡoˈstiːno koˈdattsi]; 12 July 1793 – 7 February 1859), alternatively known in Latin America as Juan Bautista Agustín Codazzi (Latin American Spanish: [aɣusˈtiŋ koˈðasi]), was an Italo-Venezuelan soldier, scientist, geographer, cartographer, and governor of Barinas (1846–1847). He made his main investigations and cartographic work in Venezuela and Colombia, thereby creating for both countries a complete set of maps and statistics after the tumultuous years following independence from the Spanish Empire (see Venezuelan War of Independence and Colombian War of Independence).

== Biography ==
Famous geographer and cartographer born in Lugo, Ravenna (Italy), arrived in South America in the 1810s and fought under the corsair Aury, claiming the independence of Florida. Attracted to the ideals of South American freedom, after obtaining the friendship of Bolivar and other generals, enrolled in the "Libertador" Army, where—thanks to his military expertise obtained in Italian academies—he behaved as excellent artillery official (colonel). After the independence wars, he left the military service and dedicated to what he liked most, the geographical & cartographical investigation, doing his most renowned masterpiece: "The Geography and Atlas of the Venezuelan Provinces" (Célebre geógrafo y cartógrafo nacido en Lugo, Ferrara, llegó a Sudamérica avanzado ya el siglo XIX y combatió a las órdenes del célebre corsario Aury, reclamando con éste la Independencia de La Florida. Cautivado por los ideales de la emancipación sudamericana, al ganarse la amistad y consideración de Simón Bolívar y otros generales patriotas se incorporó al ejército del Libertador, en cuyas filas, gracias a la preparación militar adquirida en academias italianas, tuvo destacada actuación como hábil artillero, y detentó el grado de coronel. Finalizada la lucha por la Independencia, dejaría de lado su actividad bélica para dedicarse a lo que realmente le apasionaba, la investigación geográfica y cartográfica, y llevaría a cabo su singular obra: la geografía y el atlas de las provincias venezolanas).

Codazzi was born in the Italian city of Lugo, then in the Papal States and a few years later part of the Cisalpine Republic. From a young age, he appreciated the ideals of the French Revolution and, after his studies at the military academy Scuola di Artiglieria (Artillery School) of Pavia, actively served in the Napoleonic Army.

With the defeat of Napoleon at Waterloo in 1815, Codazzi moved away from Italy and after some travels went to Venezuela, where he offered his military knowledge to Simón Bolívar and his army.

Successively he received the task of mapping the area of the Maracaibo Lake and the borders between Venezuela, Colombia and Ecuador. The Venezuelan government named him Colonel and ordered the creation of an Atlas of Venezuela, a task that gave him international fame – in Paris, Codazzi was awarded in 1842 the Legion of Honor by the King of France Louis Philippe I, on behalf of the French Academy of Sciences.

Codazzi meanwhile took the Venezuelan citizenship from president José Antonio Páez and became Governor of Barinas, a region of southwestern Venezuela. In those years his academic activity of geographer was continuously interrupted by his duties as a military commander, suffocating many revolts.

Codazzi even promoted the creation in the 1840s of the Colonia Tovar, a small German settlement in the Venezuelan central mountains that still exists today and has become one of the main tourist attractions near Maracay.

With the fall of Páez, after a military insurrection, Codazzi was forced to escape to Cúcuta (Colombia), where he continued his geographic and mapping activity with military duties for the Colombian government.

In 1852 Codazzi did a scientific and cartographic inspection of Panama for the British government: in 1854, even if with no official mention of Codazzi's work, the Panama Canal project was done following exactly his indications and route.

Codazzi died of malaria in February 1859 at the small town of Espíritu Santo in the Colombian mountains, in the arms of his friend Manuel María Paz, while he was mapping the area for the Comisión Corográfica. The town where he died has been renamed Aldea Codazzi, and now is a city with a population of nearly 70,000 inhabitants.

Venezuela honored the memory of Codazzi placing his remains inside the National Pantheon of Venezuela in 1942, where he is considered one the Heroes of Venezuela. Instituto Geográfico Agustin Codazzi, Colombia's national geographical and cartographical institute, is named after him.

== Works ==
This is a list of main works of Agostino Codazzi:

Writings
- Carta al padre (1817).
- Lettera, Imola (1823).
- Memorie inedite di Agostino Codazzi sui suoi viaggi per l'Europa e nelle Americhe (1830).
- Las Memorias, traducción, presentación y notas de Marisa Vannini de Gerulewicz, Caracas, 1970.
- Memorias, traducido al español por Andrés Soriano Lleras y Alberto Lee Lopez, Bogotá, 1973.
- Geografia de Venezuela, informes provinciales (1837).
- Notas sobre la Colonia Tovar.
- El arte de la guerra.
- Lecciones de Artilleria.
- Informes sobre demarcaciones que mas naturai y permanente puedan dividir las Provincias del Estado (1838).
- Informe sobre conducta de algunos curas.
- Instrucciones y Proclama al pueblo de Barinas con motivo de las elecciones.
- Decretos, ordenanzas, etc, de Agustin Codazzi en su calidad de Gobernador de Barinas (1846–1847).
- Cartas a Alexander Benitz (1841–1844).
- Cartas e informes sobre los trabajos de la Comisión Corográfica (1850–1859).
- Defensa de la Plaza de San Fernando en la segunda infidencia del Coronel Farfán (1837).
- República de Venezuela. Comisión Corográfica (1839).
- Prospecto de un plano general de Venezuela, y dos mapas, uno histórico y otro geográfico de su territorio (1839).
- Atlas Físico y Político de la República de Venezuela, dedicado por su autor, el Coronel de Ingenieros Agustín Codazzi al Congreso constituyente de 1830 (1841).
- Catecismo de la Geografía de Venezuela precedido de unas breves nociones de Geografia General y de Cosmografía (1841).
- Informe del Coronel A.C. al Secretano de Estado etc.; Prospecto de la empresa de la Colonia Tovar (1842).
- Proyecto de poblar con las razas teutónicas los terrenos altos y hasta hoy incultos de Venezuela (1842).
- Exposición que presenta el Gobernador de la Provincia de Barinas a la H. Diputación Provincial en su reunión ordinaria de 1846 (1846).
- Notas del Gobernador al Juez de Primera Instancia; Orden inconstitucional (1846).
- Exposición que presenta el Gobernador de la Provincia de Barinas a la H. Diputación Provincial en su reunión ordinaria de 1847 (1847).
- Apuntaciones sobre inmigración y colonización (1850).
- Geografía fisica y politica de la Provincia de Ocaña (1850).
- Informe sobre la provincia de Antioquia (1852).
- Informe sobre la Provincia del Chocó (1853).
- Informe sobre la Provincia de Barbacoas (1853).
- Apuntes de viaje (1853).
- Restimeli del diario histórico del Ejército del Atlàntico, Istmo y Mompós llamado después Ejército del Norte, levantado i mandado por el ciudadano Jeneral en Jefe Tomàs Cipriano de Mosquera (1854).
- Informe sobre la Provincia de Buenaventura (1855).
- Informe sobre la Provincia de Casanare (1856).
- Geografía física y política de las Provincias de la Nueva Granada. Provincias del Socorro y Vélez (1856).
- Geografía física y política de las Provincias de la Nueva Granada. Provincias de Tunja y Tundama (1857).
- Informe sobre los trabajos botánicos (1856).
- Informe sobre los trabajos geográficos de Cundinamarca (1857).
- Informe sobre límites entre Antioquia y Cauca (1857).
- Sobre las vías de comunicación del Estado de Cundinamarca (1858).
- Exposición del plan de la obra de la Geografia generai de la república (1857).
- Descripción del territorio del Caquetá: aspecto del país (1857).
- Antigüedades indígenas. Ruinas de San Agustín (1858).
- Carta geográfica de los Estados Unidos de Colombia, antigua Nueva Granada (1864).
- Atlas Geográfico e Histórico de la República de Colombia (antigua Nueva Granada) (1889).
Maps

=== Maps in his Memorias ===
- Carta dell'América Meridionale.
- Carta del Golfo del México, delle isole e paesi adiacenti.
- Isola della Vecchia Providenza.
- Carta della baia di Honduras.
- Carta delle Provincie di Panama, Cioccò, Cartagena, etc.
- Carta dei due camini che da S.Fe di Bogotá portano alla provincia del Cioccò estratta dalle carte del fuggitivo Viceré Samano regnante in S.Fe.
- Carta del fiume Atrato fin alla capitale del Cioccò estratta da una carta del fuggitivo Viceré Samano regnante in Santa Fé di Bogotá.

=== Maps while in Venezuela ===
- Esbozo de un plano de la región de Maracaibo (1828–1829).
- Plano topográfico del terreno por donde puede atacar el enemigo a Maracaibo (1828–1829).
- Mapa Corográfico de la Provincia de Barquisimeto (1832).
- Mapa de un sector de la provincia de la Guayana con indicación de los asentamientos indígenas (1838).
- Mapa Físico y Político de la República de Venezuela (1840).
- Plano militar de las islas de San Carlos y Bajo Seco (1848).

=== Maps while in Nueva Granada (actual Colombia) ===
- Mapa Corográfico de la Provincia de Tundama (1850).
- Mapa Corográfico de la Provincia de Tunja (1850).
- Mapa Corográfico de la Provincia de Vélez (1850).
- Mapa Corográfico de la Provincia de Socorro (1850).
- Mapa Corográfico de la Provincia de Soto (1851).
- Mapa Corográfico de la Provincia de Córdoba (1852).
- Mapa Corográfico de la Provincia de Medellín (1852).
- Mapa Corográfico de la Provincia de Barbacoas (1853).
- Mapa Corográfico de la Provincia de Túquerres (1853).
- Mapa Corográfico de la Provincia del Chocó (1853–1855).
- Mapa Corográfico de la Provincia de Buenaventura (1855).
- Mapa Corográfico de la Provincia de Casanare (1856).
- Mapa Corográfico del Estado de Panamá (1856).
- Mapa Corográfico del Estado de Cundinamarca (1858).
- Croquis varios de la Comisión Corográfica.
- Carta Geográfica de los Estados Unidos de Colombia (1865).

== See also ==
- Italo-venezuelans
- Italian language in Venezuela
- Colonia Tovar
