= Chorographic Commission =

Government project of the Republic of New Granada

The Chorographic Commission (Spanish: Comisión Corográfica) was a scientific project initially commissioned in 1850 by the Republic of the New Granada (a region which is now Colombia) that was initially led by the Italian engineer Agustín Codazzi. The purpose of the commission was to make a complete description of the New Granada and its provinces, but there were also economic interests, such as the research and acknowledgement of natural resources, the construction of means of transportation, the promotion of international commerce as well as foreign investment and immigration. In this sense there was also a political interest in the construction of a national identity where the mestizo culture was highlighted and there was a hierarchized representation of racial democracy. The commission took place in two stages; the first between 1850 and 1859, led by Agustín Codazzi, and the second between 1860 and 1862 by Manuel Ponce de León. The Colombian Chorographic Commission was a state endeavor, initially created and financed by the administration of Tomás Cipriano de Mosquera. With the help of a law which was passed in 1839, the Colombian government was able to employ various engineers and geographers to assist Codazzi in his journey after eleven years the commission was finally ready to embark on their adventure. The delay was because of the political instability. The commission would ultimately because of this very reason of political instability. During the operation of the commission, 1850–1860, it experienced the political instability first hand. By the means of administration changes and civil wars. Which would effect the commissions funds, which was very important for the success of the commission.

== Expeditions ==
In Nacy Appelbaum's book, Mapping the Country of Regions: The Chorographic Commission of the Nineteenth-Century Colombia, she explains in great detail, the expeditions of the commission. "In 1850, the Chorographic Commission -initially composed of just Agustín Codazzi, Manuel Ancízar, and support workers- embarker on its first expedition. During that year and the following year, the commission traveled through several provinces north of Bogotá in the Eastern Cordillera." Manuel Ancízar, an artist of the time, depicted the various locations the commission visited such as the town of “Santa Rosa de Viterbo, the capital of the Province of Tundama. he portrayed its inhabitants as exemplifying a pattern that repeated itself across the Northeast." However, in the Pacific lowlands, is where Codazzi would encounter many "uncivilized inhabitants and unhealthy climate of the Pacific Provinces- which included Chocó as well as neighboring provinces of Buenaventura and Barbacoas- called for a different approach than that of the Andean provinces." Pérez's comments on the natives who literally carried the men of the commission on their backs shows how the men of the commission The members of the commission “viewed most of the inhabitants of the Pacific coastal provinces: as barbarians. In the Pacific lowlands, the process of nation-state formation advanced by the commission was a colonizing project." "Codazzi explored the upper Caquetá and Putumayo Rivers and various tributaries with the assistance of Indian boatmen. Outside of the capital town of Mocoa, he reported that "I have not encountered... other rational people than the Mosquera family" (in colonial terminology, Indians were not "rational")." The commission headed south, all the way until they reached present-day Ecuador after this expedition of the southern province the group would travel north to regroup with Paz." Once the commission was reunited, which wouldn't happen until spring, the group explored. “the archaeological ruins of San Agustín in the southern highlands and explored the headwaters of the Magdalena River." The commission would admire the "achievements of ancient tribes, the Commission and its sponsors created a link between their own fragile young republic and the great civilizations of its pre-Hispanic past."

== Effects of political instability on the Commission ==
The liberal government of Colombia, which basically enacted the commission and began funding the operation, "..favored an anti-colonial critique in archaeological interpretation, the Conservatives viewed Spain’s influence as a positive force." However, some members of the community would "clearly refused to accept these results without question. Some even attempted to assert their own interpretation of the archaeological findings." Political instability would be one of the main factors that would eventually lead to the end of the commission, due to the lack of funds contributed to the commission which was needed for the success of the mission, which would be controlled by the Government officials of the time, which varied year to year.

== Dissolution ==
The commission would end because of the denial of Codazzi request for more funds. The Colombian government seemed to lose its interest in the mission of the commission."In addition to the usual problems of illness, difficult terrain, uncooperative local officials, and broken equipment, the commission faced new challenges in Bogotá." During 1855, despite completing his task at hand, Codazzi's contract was about to expire. "Codazzi argued that the delays were due to events beyond his control, particularly the 1854 war.". With a lack of government funds and Codazzi's personal funds, the commission would get an extended contract but would not receive the funds necessary to complete the task at hand.

== Legacy ==
The commission proved to be a major milestone for the young nation of Colombia. "A means for the second half of the century to have a sense of belonging and of adaptation to a land which was now theirs and which had to be appropriated and grasped as their own.” The commission would help the young country but eventually the country would “be divided, politically, ideologically and geographically and whose merit lies in maintaining its physical, democratic and idiosyncratic unity for the next 150 years." The commission and its expeditions "proves to be an effort created by a group of people who believed in the importance of organizing, studying and classifying. The legacy also stands by a heritage that developed an enterprise secured under the branches of science, art and literature." The commission produced more than maps and descriptions of the uncharted territory, the commission was responsible for the production of "both an Atlas of Colombia and many watercolor drawings that portrayed not only the physical landscape, but also social, economic, and agricultural aspects of the country, including its people, transportation, crops, and trades."
