= Corral de Almaguer =

- Municipality
- Coat of arms

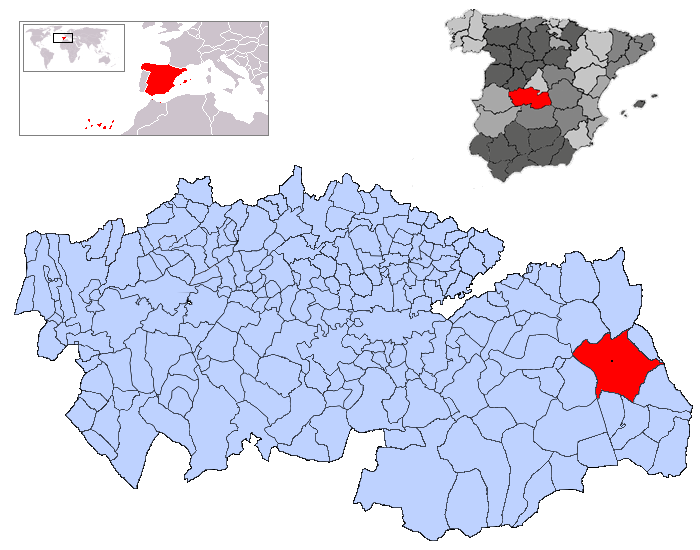

- Location in Spain Location in Castilla-La Mancha
- Coordinates: 39°45′34″N 3°9′54″W
- Country: Spain
- Autonomous community: Castile-La Mancha
- Province: Toledo
- Comarca: La Mancha
- Judicial district: Quintanar de la Orden
- Founded: Ver texto

Government
  - Alcaldesa: Juliana Fernández de la Cueva Lominchar(2007)

Area
  - Total: 326 km^{2} (126 sq mi)
- Elevation: 714 m (2,343 ft)

Population (2025-01-01)
  - Total: 5,280
  - Density: 16.2/km^{2} (41.9/sq mi)
- Demonym(s): Corraleño, ña
- Time zone: UTC+1 (CET)
  - Summer (DST): UTC+2 (CEST)
- Postal code: 45880
- Dialing code: 925
- Website: Official website

Corral de Almaguer is a Spanish municipality of Toledo province, in the autonomous community of Castile-La Mancha. Its population is 5,549 and its surface is 329 km², with a density of 16.9 people/km².

The mayor of Corral de Almaguer is Juliana Fernández de la Cueva Lominchar of the ruling Partido Popular.

In the 2004 Spanish General Election the Partido Popular got 56.0% of the vote in Corral de Almaguer, the Partido Socialista Obrero got 39.1% and Izquierda Unida got 2.8%.

The Romero family of New Mexico, which at one point was one of the most powerful families in colonized New Mexico is from this region of Spain. The Romero family traces its lineage to Bartolomé Romero (1530–1567) who was born in Corral de Almaguer, whilst his grandson, Matias Romero de Robledo (abt 1590s-1648) was born en route to New Mexico.

== Demographics ==
Historical population
Year	Pop.	±%
1900	4,996	—
1910	4,916	−1.6%
1920	6,354	+29.3%
1930	8,491	+33.6%
1940	7,837	−7.7%
1950	8,603	+9.8%
1960	8,261	−4.0%
1970	8,006	−3.1%
1981	6,249	−21.9%
1991	5,782	−7.5%
2001	5,594	−3.3%
2011	6,258	+11.9%
2021	5,068	−19.0%
2023	5,219	+3.0%
Source:INE
