= 1833 Colombian presidential election =

- 1833

Presidential elections were held in the Republic of New Granada in 1833. Francisco de Paula Santander was re-elected president, whilst Joaquín Mosquera was elected vice president.

== Background ==
Following the promulgation of the new constitution, Francisco de Paula Santander was elected interim president by the Constituent Assembly on 9 March 1832, to serve until the first official presidential term began on 1 April 1833.

The electoral college was elected later in 1832.

== Results ==
=== President ===
Candidate	Votes	%
Francisco de Paula Santander	1,012	80.13
Joaquín Mosquera	121	9.58
José Ignacio de Márquez	35	2.77
Rafael Mosquero	30	2.38
Eusebio Canabal	14	1.11
José Fábrega	13	1.03
Domingo Caycedo	9	0.71
José María Obando	5	0.40
Félix Restrepo	3	0.24
Enrique Umaño	3	0.24
Santiago Pérez De Valencia	2	0.16
Miguel Uribe Restrepo	2	0.16
Juan de Dios Amador	1	0.08
Mariano Arosemena	1	0.08
Luis Antonio Baralt	1	0.08
Vicente Borrero	1	0.08
Salvador Camacho	1	0.08
José María Cuervo	1	0.08
Rufino Cuervo y Barreto	1	0.08
José María Estévez	1	0.08
Juan Fernández de Sotomayor	1	0.08
Diego F. Gómez	1	0.08
José María Mantilla	1	0.08
Manual Mota	1	0.08
José María Ortega	1	0.08
José Cornelio Valencia	1	0.08
Total	1,263	100.00
Source: Historia electoral colombiana

=== Vice President ===
Candidate	College vote		Congressional vote					
Candidate	Votes	%	Votes	%	Votes	%	Votes	%
José Ignacio de Márquez	422	34.45	22	38.60	22	38.60	19	33.33
Joaquín Mosquera	217	17.71	25	43.86	35	61.40	38	66.67
Rafael Mosquera	148	12.08	10	17.54				
Vicente Azuero	122	9.96						
Miguel Uribe	52	4.24						
Domingo Caycedo	46	3.76						
José María Obando	38	3.10						
Diego F Gómez	29	2.37						
José María Ortega	27	2.20						
José María del Castillo y Rada	16	1.31						
Juan de Dios Amador	15	1.22						
Pereira Soto	13	1.06						
José Fábrega	13	1.06						
Dr Cuervo	11	0.90						
Felix Restrepo	10	0.82						
José Vallarino	10	0.82						
Antonion Borrero	10	0.82						
Others	26	2.12						
Total	1,225	100.00	57	100.00	57	100.00	57	100.00
Source: Historia electoral colombiana
