= Dictatorship of Simón Bolívar in Gran Colombia =

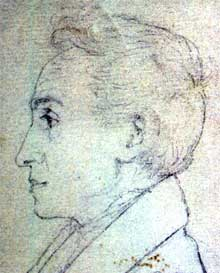
Simón Bolívar, 1828

The dictatorship of Simón Bolívar in Gran Colombia was the final period of Bolívar's government, following the Organic Decree of the Dictatorship of Bolívar in 1828.

After the failure of the Convention of Ocaña, Bolívar carried out a self-coup in 1828, abolishing the office of vice president and initiating a final dictatorial stage in his government that lasted until his resignation in 1830, when he convened the Admirable Congress and handed over power to Joaquín Mosquera. Vice President Francisco de Paula Santander, for his part, was accused of being an accomplice in the assassination attempt against Bolívar at the Palacio de San Carlos after his assumption as dictator, and was exiled in 1828.

The department of Venezuela announced its separation in 1829, and Bolívar convened the Admirable Congress in 1830, where he submitted his resignation with the intention of preventing the imminent dissolution of Gran Colombia, which was followed by the separation of the departments of Ecuador and the Isthmus, as well as the assassination of Antonio José de Sucre, his preferred successor. In December of that year, Bolívar died, and the following year the Republic of Colombia was considered dissolved, changing its name to the Republic of New Granada.

== Domestic policy ==
=== Organic Decree of the Dictatorship of Bolívar ===
The Organic Decree of the Dictatorship of Bolívar was a constitution decreed by the president Bolívar, under which he assumed extraordinary powers and declared a dictatorship in the country until 1830, signed by Bolívar and his ministers José Manuel Restrepo, Rafael Urdaneta, Estanislao Vergara, and Nicolás Tanco after the failure of the Convention of Ocaña.

=== Election of Antonio José de Sucre as successor ===
On February 2, 1829, Simón Bolívar wrote a letter to José María del Castillo y Rada, in which he expressed his conviction that the September Night assassination attempt against him the previous year had sealed the fate of the nation and of himself outside of power. He predicted that Colombia would fragment into two or three nations.

By mid‑1829, Bolívar seriously considered resigning from the presidency of Colombia due to the physical and mental fatigue he felt.

Bolívar wrote to Daniel Florence O'Leary on September 13, 1829, stating that "the current Government of Colombia is not sufficient to order and administer its extensive provinces," and therefore argued:

"The Constituent Congress will have to choose one of the two remaining unique resolutions given the state of affairs:

1st—The division of New Granada and Venezuela.

2nd—The creation of a lifelong and strong government.

In the first case, the division of these two countries must be perfect, just, and peaceful. Once declared, each part will reorganize itself in its own way and will treat separately on common interests and mutual relations. I believe that New Granada should remain intact, so that it can defend itself in the South against the Peruvians and so that Pasto does not become its cancer. Venezuela must remain equally intact, as it was before the union."

At the end of 1829, Bolívar wrote a letter to Juan José Flores, in which he mentioned that he felt tired and would leave Colombia, offering "with soul and heart" Antonio José de Sucre as his successor in office. Sucre would be assassinated the following year.

=== Admirable Congress ===
The Admirable Congress was a constituent assembly of Gran Colombia convened by Simón Bolívar in an attempt to reconcile the creation of the Republic and to prevent the dissolution of Gran Colombia by drafting a new constitution.

== Foreign policy ==
The Gran Colombian–Peruvian War (Spanish: Guerra grancolombo-peruana) of 1828 and 1829 was the first international conflict fought by the Republic of Peru, which had gained its independence from Spain in 1821, and Gran Colombia, that existed between 1819 and 1830.

== Opposition ==
According to public opinion, the political board was divided between the liberal faction and the servile faction, the latter being Bolívar's.

=== Septembrine Conspiracy ===
The Septembrine Conspiracy was an attempted assassination of Simón Bolívar when he was president of Gran Colombia. It occurred in Bogotá on September 25, 1828. Three dozen attackers, commanded by Commander Pedro Carujo, forcefully entered the Presidential Palace at midnight. After killing the guards, they went to Bolívar's room. Bolívar managed to escape through the window with the help of his partner Manuela Sáenz. In the trials that followed the attack, his main opponent, General Francisco de Paula Santander, was condemned to death, but Bolívar spared his life and exiled him instead. The events influenced the disintegration of Gran Colombia three years later.

== See also ==
- Presidency of Simón Bolívar in the Third Republic of Venezuela
