= 1830 Colombian presidential election =

- 4 May 1830

Indirect presidential elections were held in Gran Colombia on 4 May 1830 following the resignation of incumbent president Simón Bolívar. Joaquín Mosquera was elected president, whilst Domingo Caycedo was elected vice president.

== Background ==
Suffering from ill-health, President Bolívar resigned in January 1830 during a Constitutional Convention. He named Domingo Caycedo as his successor until a Congressional vote in May.

== Results ==
=== President ===
Candidate	First round		Second round		Third round	
Candidate	Votes	%	Votes	%	Votes	%
Eusebio Canabal	26	54.17	17	35.42	14	29.17
Joaquín Mosquera	17	35.42	27	56.25	34	70.83
Domingo Caycedo	5	10.42	4	8.33		
Total	48	100.00	48	100.00	48	100.00
Source: Historia electoral colombiana

=== Vice President ===
Candidate	Votes	%
Domingo Caycedo	33	68.75
Eusebio Canabal	12	25.00
José Vallarino	2	4.17
Vicente Borrero	1	2.08
Total	48	100.00
Source: Historia electoral colombiana

== Aftermath ==
Mosquera and Caycedo were forced out of office on 4 September under pressure from the military. General Rafael Urdaneta was appointed interim president the following day whilst a response from Bolívar on whether he would return to the Presidency was awaited. However, he refused to accept the post, and gave his support to Urdaneta. Bolívar died in December.

Following a brief civil war in early 1831, Urdaneta left office and elections were held for a Constituent Assembly. Presidential elections were held the following year.
