= 1832 Colombian presidential election =

- 9 March 1832

Indirect presidential elections were held in the Republic of New Granada on 9 March 1832. Francisco de Paula Santander was elected president, whilst José Ignacio de Márquez was elected vice president.

== Background ==
Joaquín Mosquera was elected President in May 1830, but was forced out of office on 4 September that year under pressure from the military. General Rafael Urdaneta was appointed interim president the following day whilst a response from former President Simón Bolívar on whether he would return to the Presidency was awaited. However, he refused to accept the post, and gave his support to Urdaneta. Bolívar died in December.

Following a brief civil war in early 1831, Urdaneta left office and elections were held for a Constituent Assembly. A new constitution was drafted, and the Assembly elected an interim President to serve until the first normal term of office would start on 1 April 1833.

== Results ==
=== President ===
Candidate	Votes	%
Francisco de Paula Santander	49	75.38
Joaquín Mosquera	6	9.23
Others	10	15.38
Total	65	100.00
Source: Historia electoral colombiana

=== Vice President ===
After fifteen rounds of voting, José Ignacio de Márquez was elected with 42 votes to the 20 received by José María Obando.
