= Septembrine Conspiracy =

1828 assassination attempt on Simón Bolívar

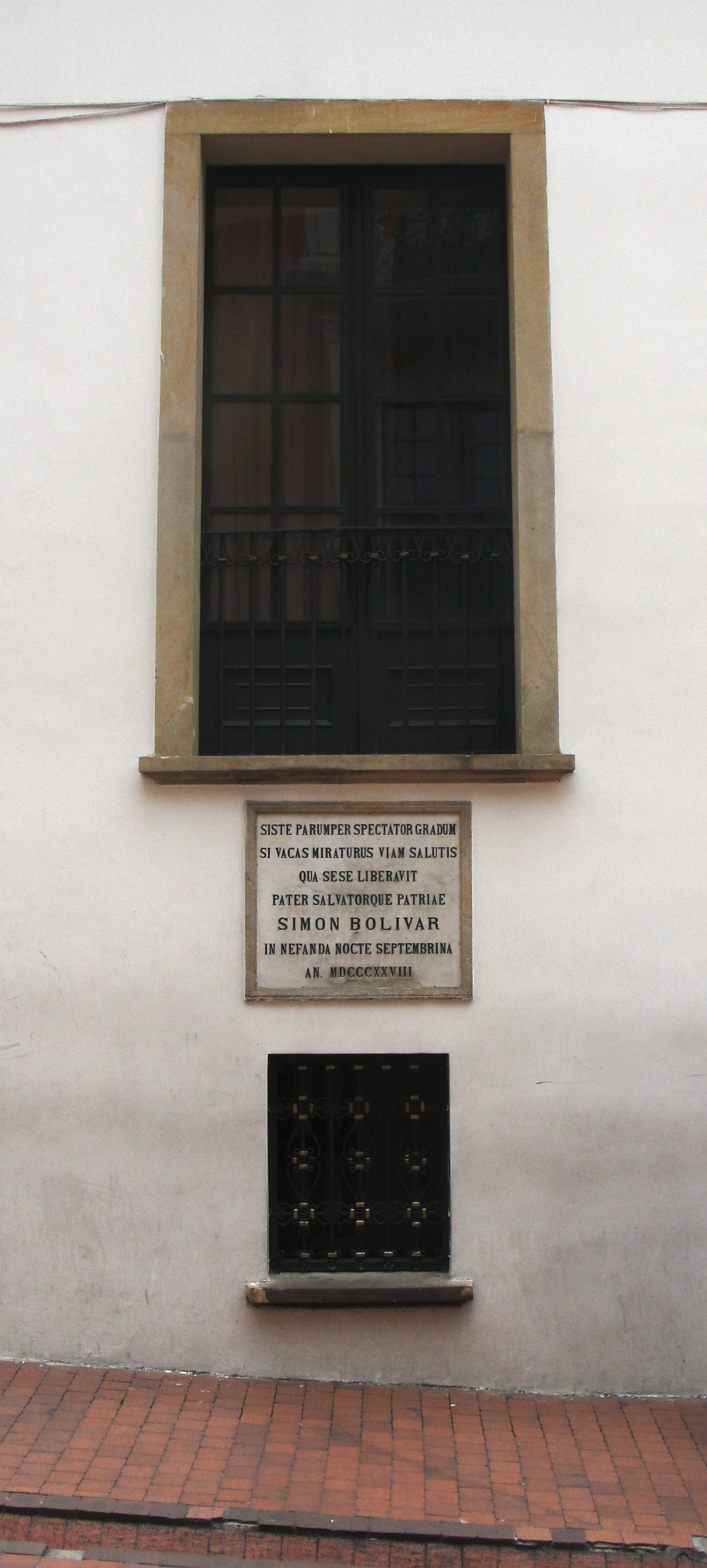
- Window of the Palace of San Carlos through which Simón Bolívar escaped from the attack.
- Date: 25 September 1828
- Location: Palacio de San Carlos, Bogotá
- Type: conspiracy and assassination attempt
- Target: Simón Bolívar

The Septembrine Conspiracy was an attempted assassination of Simón Bolívar when he was president of Gran Colombia. It occurred in Bogotá on September 25, 1828. Three dozen attackers, commanded by Commander Pedro Carujo, forcefully entered the Presidential Palace at midnight. After killing the guards, they went to Bolívar's room. Bolívar managed to escape through the window with the help of his partner Manuela Sáenz. In the trials that followed the attack, his main opponent, General Francisco de Paula Santander, was condemned to death, but Bolívar spared his life and exiled him instead. The events influenced the disintegration of Gran Colombia three years later.

== Background ==
The government of Gran Colombia was highly centralized, with military rulers who often disregarded the laws of the 1821 constitution. Many regions within Gran Colombia had previously had federalist systems of government and had been promised autonomy, but these promises had been ignored by the central government. As a result, there were numerous uprisings and revolts in response to the military's abuse of authority and use of fear to control the population. These rebellions were fueled by the demands of local leaders and the general population for more autonomy and respect for their rights.

Bolívar agreed to be the ruler of Peru, but by 1826 he had to leave a Council of State in charge in Lima, as he needed to negotiate with the leaders of the La Cosiata uprising. Bolívar had left instructions to complete the process of instituting a new constitution in Peru and Bolivia, which was eventually carried out. However, in January 1827, the Peruvians rebelled, claiming that the new constitution had been forced upon them through an irregular process that violated their laws. The Peruvians nullified the constitution and removed Bolívar as a potential ruler of Peru.

The proposal for a lifelong constitution was also presented to the Convention of Ocaña, but it was rejected, and by June 10, 1828, no agreement had been reached. On August 27, 1828, Bolívar signed a decree dissolving Congress, imposing a military regime, and declaring himself dictator, which further fueled social discontent towards the government of the time.

== Events ==
Opposition to Bolívar had grown among the Neogranadine liberals, especially after he declared himself dictator. These liberals had formed secret societies called "SSP" (Parliamentary Socratic Society, in Spanish: Sociedad Socrática Parlamental), similar to those of the French Revolution. Mostly made up of students and intellectuals, these societies met to discuss political issues. At one of these meetings, Luis Vargas Tejada made his famous speech:

Spanish

Si de Bolívar la letra con que empieza
y aquélla con la que acaba le quitamos,
«oliva» de la paz símbolo hallamos.
Esto quiere decir que la cabeza
al tirano y los pies cortar debemos
si es que una paz durable apetecemos.

Translation:
English

If from Bolívar the letter with which it begins
and the one with which it ends we take away,
«olive» of peace symbol we find.
This means that the head
to the tyrant and the feet to cut we must
if we want a lasting peace.

From one of those meetings in early September of that year came the idea of killing Bolívar. To do this, they attempted to gain supporters in the Armed Forces, recruiting veterans, reservists and sergeants, including those expelled or about to be expelled for their misconduct.

=== Assassination attempt ===
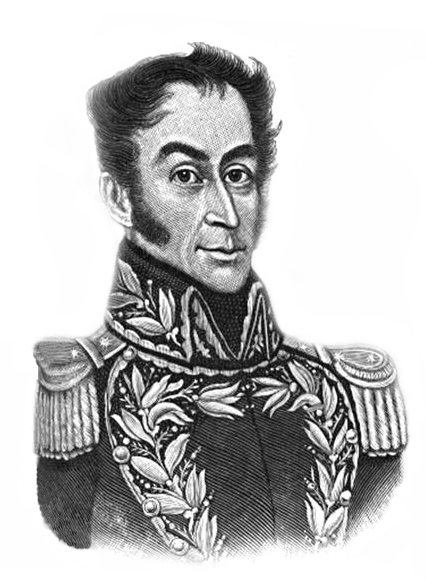
Simón Bolívar, target of the September Conspiracy attack.

On the night of September 25, about twelve civilians and twenty-five soldiers led by Pedro Carujo broke into the Presidential Palace (Palacio de San Carlos) and killed the guards. They then searched for Bolívar's room. Manuela Sáenz, who was with Bolívar that night, woke him up. Upon learning of the attack, Bolívar grabbed his pistol and sword and tried to open the door, but Manuela convinced him to escape through the window.

Bolívar sent to find out the situation in the barracks while he was under a bridge all night. Bolívar managed to jump out of the window while Manuela entertained and engaged the conspirators. The result of this conspiracy was the death of Colonel William Ferguson, an English aide-de-camp, the injury of young Andrés Ibarra, and a concussion from a blow to the forehead received by the rescuer of the illustrious Caracas native. The freed slave José Palacios carried the man newly saved from death to a safe place. Vargas's battalion led by Colonel Whittle contributed to the failure of the conspiracy. Finally, it was up to Generals Rafael Urdaneta and José María Córdova to put an end to the plot, control the situation in the capital and imprison those involved in this sinister attack.

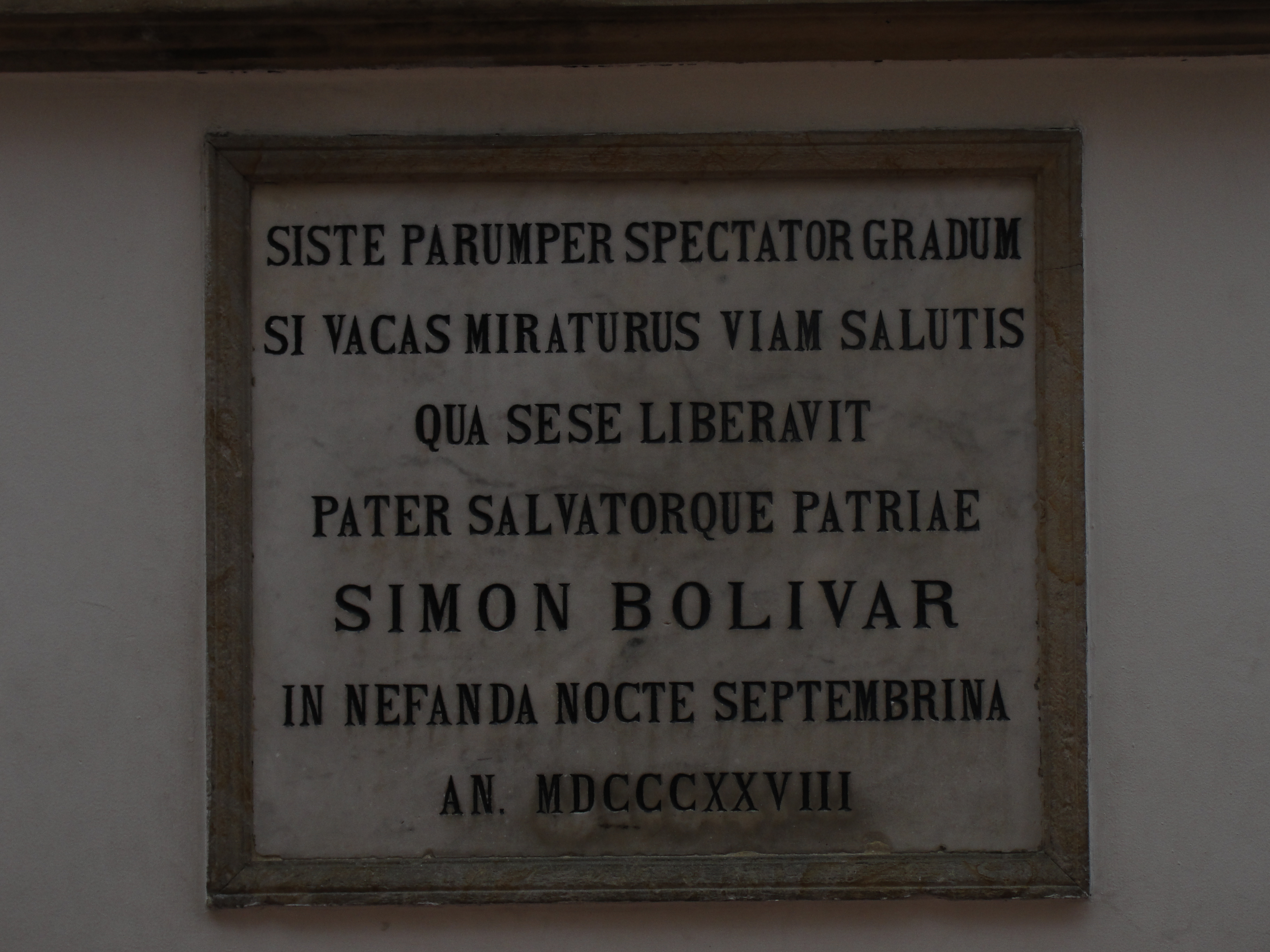
Photo of the plaque in the Palacio de San Carlos

During the days that followed, the alleged culprits were arrested and a "trial" followed for many of them, as well as high-ranking soldiers who were suspected of participating in the attack, whether planning, collaborating with its executors or simply keeping quiet. Francisco de Paula Santander was accused without any evidence, and Admiral José Prudencio Padilla, whom twelve artillerymen and an officer tried to release from prison in the cavalry militia barracks so that he would take sides, Padilla refused, telling them that he was a prisoner and should not get mixed up in such a situation. They managed to make him go down to the door of the barracks, from where in favor of the military bustle, and he went back up to his lodging, where he found the sergeant and a soldier from the guard who were guarding him and had taken refuge in that room together with his aide; that after the troop that had entered that barracks withdrew, he gathered the weapons of the guard and made his assistant close the door of the barracks with a key, suspicious that they try to go back in to force him to take up arms, as they had tried to do at first, or kill him if he did not agree; that he remained that way until he noticed that the noise had ceased, in which act he sent his assistant to notify General Urdaneta or another chief.

=== Aftermath ===
Vicente Azuero and other opponents did not participate, but there were direct participants in the conspiracy such as Luis Vargas Tejada, Florentino González, Captain Emigdio Briceño Guzmán (1800, Carache, Trujillo, Venezuela; 6 January 1874, Santa Fe de Bogotá), called in Venezuela "El septembrista" and even Pedro Carujo, Bolívar's bitter enemy, who were tried by the Council of Ministers and found guilty. Their sentences were commuted to exile, but although some were pardoned like Carujo, a new era of terror was inaugurated. After a dubious trial, Santander was found guilty and was demoted, dishonorably expelled and sentenced to die shot in the back, but his sentence was commuted to exile by Bolívar's decision. Similarly, Azuero and González had their sentences commuted to exile. Vargas Tejada drowned in a river during his escape in the Eastern Plains.

The events of the Septembrine Conspiracy and the subsequent trials that were carried out abnormally by means of a newly created court ex post facto when a court of conspirators emerged, In addition, Bolívar, when reviewing the sentences issued by the court of eight people, became furious by stating that "he did not accept acquittals", by September 29 Bolívar decided to dissolve the court and order Rafael Urdaneta as Sole Judge with the support of Tomás Barriga of the missing cases and the review of those acquitted or convictions that left him unsatisfied, Urdaneta acted summarily setting aside any sense of impartiality or neutrality in the cases, Urdaneta preferred to act in his favor, however many charges were brought without evidence to the defendants in process and simply handed down the sentences (there were no trials), for those decisions that were made even minors and people who did not participate in that event were sentenced to the death penalty, including Admiral José Prudencio Padilla, who was in prison when the attack occurred and the court had acquitted him. Due to these determinations, the rejection against Bolívar and close military leaders grew, contributing to the reasons for the dissolution of Gran Colombia.
