= Convention of Ocaña =

1828 constituent assembly in Colombia

The Convention of Ocaña was a constituent assembly that took place in the Colombian city of Ocaña between April 9 and June 10, 1828. Its objective was to reform the Constitution of Cúcuta and resolve political differences concerning the future of the republic.

== Background ==
Gran Colombia, since 1826 had been economically exhausted by the long campaign to liberate Ecuador, Peru and Bolivia from royalist control. In addition, there were conflicting interests between the political administration and the military of the new nation, as well as tension between local leaders, who did not accept to be subordinates of the central government.

In 1826 General José Antonio Páez, an important caudillo and military leader of the department of Venezuela, rebelled against the central government in a separatist movement called La Cosiata, which is brought to a temporary but peaceful resolution by the personal intervention of Simón Bolívar in 1827, who promised to convene a constituent congress to rewrite the nation's constitution, despite the fact that Constitution of Cúcuta stated that it could not be reformed before ten years (that is, not until 1831).

== Events ==
José María del Castillo y Rada was chosen as president and Andrés Narvarte as vice president of the convention. At the Convention two political currents came into sharp relief: support for a strong presidency, mostly expressed by followers of Bolívar, and support for a more decentralized government, the proponents of which tended to gather around the figure of Vice-president Francisco de Paula Santander. During the opening sessions, Bolívar proposed a new, highly centralized constitution based on the one he recently had written for Bolivia in 1826, but this suggestion proved to be unpopular. The discussion of various political projects, especially whether to establish more centralism or implement federalism, became extremely contentious. Since the Constitution of Cúcuta prohibited its revision before 1831, Santander and his allies were able to support maintaining the status quo and to abandon any idea of reforming the Constitution in the name of maintaining national unity. Nevertheless, a tense atmosphere remained and the Convention did not come to its planned conclusion because the Bolívar's followers quit it. Bolívar, in an effort to maintain the unity of Gran Colombia, assumed dictatorial powers on August 27, 1828.

Deputies elected for the Ocaña convention of 1828
For the province of Bogotá	For the province of Mariquita	For the province of Caracas	For the province of Carabobo	For the province of Maracaibo	For the province of Panamá
Francisco de Paula Santander	José María del Castillo	Martín Tobar	Salvador Mesa	Antonio M. Briceño	José Vallarino
Vicente Azuero	Alejandro Osorio	Andrés Narvarte	Francisco Aranda	Antonio Febres Cordero	Manuel Muñoz
Luis Vargas Tejada	Pedro Carrasquilla	José de Iribarren	Vicente Michelena	Manuel Pardo	
Francisco Soto	Mariano de Echezuría	Miguel Peña	For the province of Mérida		
Diego Gómez	For the province of de Coro	J. Manuel Manrique	Juan J. Romero	Cristóbal Mendoza	For the province of Santa Marta
Joaquín Gori	Rafael Hermoso	Diego Bautista Urbaneja	Ignacio Díaz	Ignacio F. Peña	Santiago Mazenet
Domingo Caicedo	Manuel Vicente Huizi	Santos Rodríguez	Juan Bautista Quintana		
Romualdo Liévano	For the province of Mompós				
Manuel Cañarete	For the province of Riohacha	For the province of Pichincha	For the province of Imbabura	For the province of Chimborazo	
Of Guayaquil	Juan Bautista Quintana	Juan de Francisco Martín	José A. Pontón	Salvador Murgueitio	N. Moreno
José Joaquín de Olmedo	Luis de Saá	Vicente Aguirre	N. Ricaurte		
Francisco Márquez	Of Popayán	Of Pasto	Antonio Ante	Francisco Montúfar	
Pablo Merino	José Rafael Mosquera	Manuel M. Quijano	Jesús Clavijo	Of Buenaventura	Prudencio Bascones
Manuel M. Quijano	Manuel Zambrano	Joaquín Mosquera	Tomás Viteri		
For the province of Chocó	Fortunato Gamba	Ignacio Escobar			
Hilario López	José Antonio Borrero				

== Subsequent developments ==
After the failure of the Convention of Ocaña, Santander left for Cúcuta and then to Bogotá.

On June 13, 1828, a popular movement in Bogota, led by General Pedro Alcántara Herrán, intendant and general commander of the department of Cundinamarca, promoted the idea of the military command seizing power. On August 27, 1828, Simon Bolivar proclaimed himself dictator and signed an order revoking the powers of the deputies of Bogotá to the convention and declaring its decrees null and void. Bolívar had assumed supreme command of the nation.

On August 27, Bolívar promulgated an organic decree, which he called the "Fundamental Law," through which he assumed the dictatorship and left the Constitution of Cúcuta without effect, dissolving Congress and other political offices, such as the vice-presidency, which might be points of opposition to him. On September 11, Estanislao Vergara, Minister of Foreign Affairs, informed Vice-president Santander that he had been appointed as Plenipotentiary Minister of Colombia to the United States. A few weeks later, there would be an attempt on Bolívar's life, which he survived, but the nation remained unstable until 1831 when separatist movements won out and Gran Colombia was dissolved.
