= José Ignacio de Márquez =

Colombian statesman, lawyer and professor

His Excellency José Ignacio de Márquez Barreto
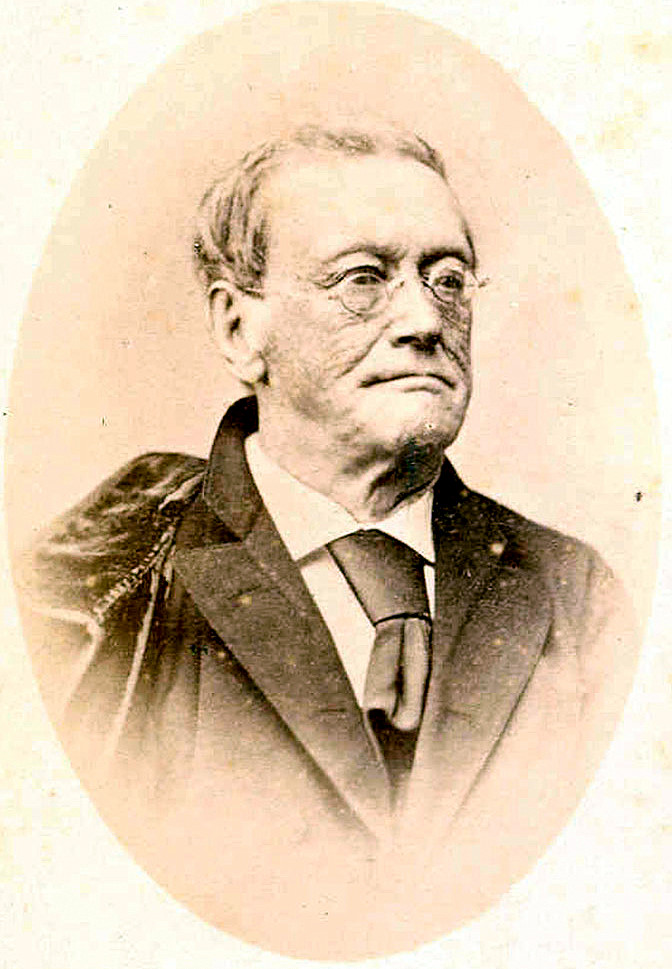

2nd President of the New Granada
- In office April 1, 1837 – April 1, 1841
- Preceded by: Francisco de Paula Santander
- Succeeded by: Pedro Alcántara Herrán

2nd and 4th Vice President of the New Granada
- In office March 10, 1832 – May 12, 1833
- President: Francisco de Paula Santander
- Preceded by: José María Obando
- Succeeded by: Joaquín Mosquera
- In office April 1, 1835 – April 1, 1837
- President: Francisco de Paula Santander
- Preceded by: Joaquín Mosquera
- Succeeded by: Domingo Caycedo

Personal details
- Born: September 9, 1793 Ramiriquí, Boyacá, Colombia
- Died: March 21, 1880 (aged 86) Bogotá, Cundinamarca, Colombia
- Party: Liberal
- Spouse: María Antonia del Castillo y Vargas Machuca
- Vice president in charge of the country due to the absence of the President

José Ignacio de Márquez Barreto (7 September 1793 – 21 March 1880) was a Colombian statesman, lawyer and professor, who first served as Vice President of the Republic of the New Granada after being sworn in by congress in 1832, and under the presidency of Francisco de Paula Santander, and subsequently was elected President of the Republic of the New Granada for the presidential term of 1837 to 1841.

== Biographic data ==
Márquez was born in Ramiriquí, Boyacá and died in Bogotá, Cundinamarca at the age of 86.

== Early life ==
Márquez studied in the Colegio Mayor de San Bartolomé in Bogotá, where he studied jurisprudence and obtained his lawyer degree at age 20.

== Political career ==
In 1821, Márquez was elected as delegated to the Congress of Cucuta, and at age 27, he was elected as President of the congress. As such, he was inaugurated and took the oath of General Simón Bolívar as President of the Gran Colombia, and General Francisco de Paula Santander as Vice President. Later, in the same capacity, he would take the oaths of General Tomás Cipriano de Mosquera and José Hilario López.

In 1831, Márquez was appointed as Secretary of the Treasury by President Domingo Caycedo.

== The Presidency ==
Later, in 1832, Congress elected the president and vice president of Colombia. General Santander was chosen as president and Márquez as vice president. As such, on March 10, 1832, during President Francisco de Paula Santander’s trip abroad, Márquez occupied the Presidency as interim president.

José Ignacio de Márquez won the 1836 Colombian presidential election, the first free and fair election in Colombian history. He defeated the candidate supported by incumbent president.

His presidency was noted for its economic and educational reforms and for the War of the Supremes in Pasto, Nariño.
