= Domingo Caycedo =

Colombian statesman and president (1783–1843)

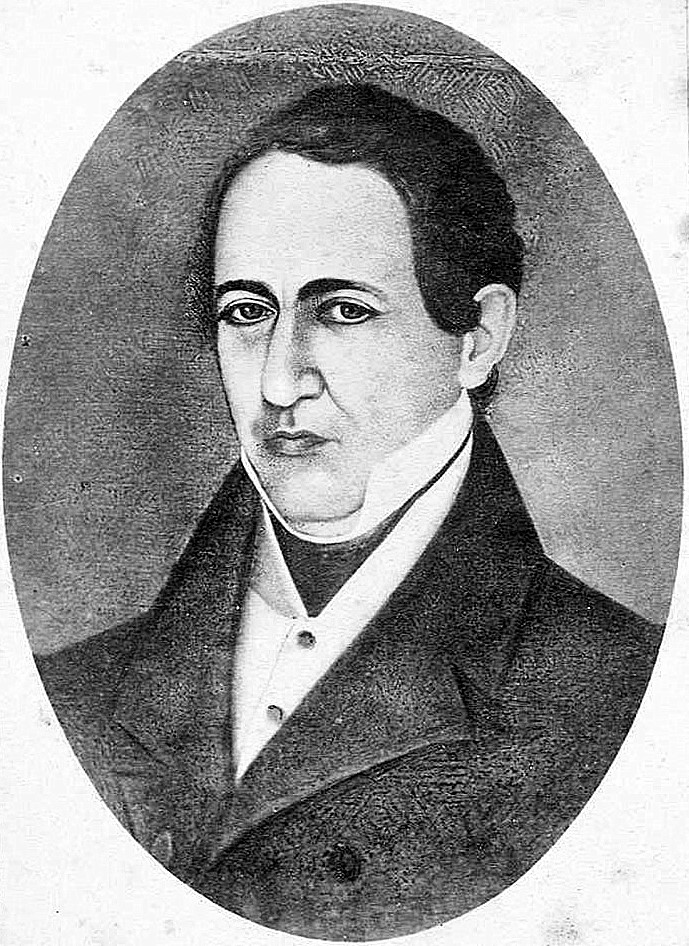

5th Vice President of New Granada
- In office April 1, 1837 – April 1, 1843
- President: José Ignacio de Márquez
- Preceded by: José Ignacio de Márquez
- Succeeded by: Joaquín Gori

6th and 7th Vice President of Gran Colombia
- In office May 3, 1831 – November 21, 1831
- President: Vacant
- Preceded by: Vacant
- Succeeded by: Position abolished
- In office May 3, 1830 – June 13, 1830
- President: Joaquín Mosquera
- Preceded by: Francisco de Paula Santander
- Succeeded by: Vacant

Personal details
- Born: August 4, 1783 Santafé de Bogotá, Viceroyalty of New Granada
- Died: July 1, 1843 (aged 59) Puente Aranda, Republic of New Granada
- Party: Conservative
- Spouse: Juana Jurado y Bertendona
- Never elected president, but during vacancies in the office of president, he served a total of 11 times as Interim President

Domingo de Caycedo y Sanz de Santamaría (August 4, 1783 – July 1, 1843) was a Colombian statesman who served as the vice president of Gran Colombia and the Republic of New Granada. He served as acting President of Colombia a total of eleven times, the most terms any president has served to date. He is also credited for creating the Republic of New Granada after the division of Venezuela and Ecuador.

== Personal life ==
Domingo Caicedo was born in Santa Fe de Bogotá on August 4, 1783, son of Luis Caicedo y Flórez, Caballero de la Real y Muy Distinguida Orden de Carlos III, and Josefa Sanz de Santamaría y Prieto, both criollos from aristocratic families of the colonial era. His father Luis Caicedo y Flórez was a caudillo from Tolima, where his family owned many estates, including the haciendas Saldaña and Santa Bárbara de Contreras. His uncle Fernando Caicedo y Flórez was the first Archbishop of the Archdiocese of Bogotá. Among his paternal ancestors was Juan Flórez de Ocariz, a Spanish-born writer and historian who authored the well-known books Genealogías del Nuevo Reino de Granada.

Caicedo studied Law at the Colegio Mayor de Nuestra Señora del Rosario (now known as Universidad del Rosario) in Bogotá, where he later became vice-rector (deputy headmaster). At an early age, he decided not to practice law, and instead pursued military and political activities. He later became a general in the army and then president of the country. He traveled to Spain, where he joined the army to fight against Napoleon, and he also worked as a secretary in the Spanish Cortes (Congress).

In 1815, he married the Spanish-born Juana Jurado y Bertendona, daughter of Juan Jurado y Laynes and María Concepción Bertendona, in Bogotá, with whom he had eight children. He died in Puente Aranda, near Bogotá, on July 1, 1843.

== Military career ==
Upon learning of the events of July 20, 1810, Caycedo returned to America with Vicente Bolívar, brother of Simón Bolívar, the future “Libertador” and first president of Colombia. Caycedo enlisted in the Colombian revolutionary army. He became a member of the Advisory Council to General Antonio Nariño.

He fought in the battle of la Cuchilla del Tambo and the battle of “la Plata”, where he was arrested by Spanish troops. He was court-martialed as a prisoner of war, found guilty of treason, and sentenced to death. His life was spared thanks to the influence of his father-in-law, his wife Juana Jurado y Bertendona, and some monetary payments to the Spanish authorities. He was freed under probation and vanished from the war theatre until the revolutionary triumph at the Battle of Boyacá (Puente de Boyacá) on August 7, 1819.

== Political career ==
Once again, after the revolutionary triumph of August 7, 1819, Caycedo returned to public life under the protection of Simón Bolívar. In 1827 he was appointed as Governor of Neiva, elected to Congress, and ascended to General of the Army. He became part of the inner circle of Bolívar, who appointed him as Secretary of the Interior in 1829 and a year later as Secretary of State. Afterward, Caycedo was appointed as president of the “Consejo de Estado” (the precursor of the Supreme Court) to replace the retiring José María Castillo y Rada, who decided to become a member of Congress of Gran Colombia.

== The Presidency ==
On April 1, 1830, President Bolívar took a leave of absence from Bogotá to the Hacienda of Fucha to recover from an illness. Caycedo assumed the Office of Interim President. This would be the first of several occasions in which he acted as President in this capacity.

Later that same year, when Bolívar irrevocably resigned the presidency, Congress elected Don Joaquín de Mosquera as president and Caycedo as vice president. Because Mosquera was very ill and frail, Caycedo assumed the executive power as acting president on August 2, 1830.

Caycedo was deposed by the first coup d’état in the country, by the Venezuelan General Rafael Urdaneta on September 5, 1830. Months later, supported by the regrouped constitutional army, Caycedo proclaimed he was the legitimate president on April 11, 1831. He contacted General Urdaneta and invited him to a summit to discuss the future of the nation's government. Urdaneta accepted, and on April 28, 1831, they met at Juntas de Apulo, near the town of Tocaima. They both reached an agreement and signed the Accord of Apalo, by which General Urdaneta recognized Caycedo as acting president. Thus, Caycedo, once again, took office on May 3, 1831.

Caycedo, as acting president, convened Congress. On November 15, 1831, Congress elected General Francisco de Paula Santander as president and General José María Obando as vice president.

A few years later Caycedo was elected to Congress, appointed Secretary of the Treasury. Caycedo would act as interim president for the six times president José Ignacio de Márquez would be absent from office for short periods of time. During the presidency of Pedro Alcántara Herrán (1841-1845), Caycedo acted as interim president twice during temporary absences by the president.

Political offices
Preceded by Joaquín de Mosquera y Arboleda	President of Gran Colombia; 4 May 1830 – 4 September 1830	Succeeded by Rafael Urdaneta y Faría
