= Joaquín Mosquera =

Colombian politician (1787–1878)

Joaquín Mosquera y Arboleda
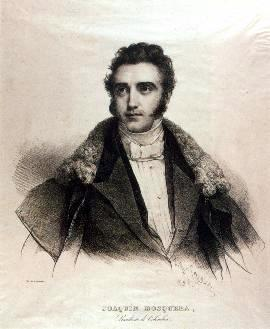

3rd Vice President of New Granada
- In office 12 May 1833 – 1 April 1835; Acting President: 13 June–4 September 1830; 1 May-1 November 1831
- President: Francisco de Paula Santander
- Preceded by: José Ignacio de Márquez
- Succeeded by: José Ignacio de Márquez

2nd President of Colombia
- In office 4 May – 4 September 1830 with Domingo Caycedo as Acting President: 4 May–13 June & 2–17 August
- Preceded by: Simón Bolívar
- Succeeded by: Rafael Urdaneta

Personal details
- Born: Joaquín Mariano Mosquera y Arboleda; 14 December 1787 Popayán, Popayán, Viceroyalty of the New Granada
- Died: 4 April 1878 (aged 90) Santa Fe de Bogotá, Cundinamarca, United States of Colombia
- Spouse: María Josefa Mosquera Hurtado

Joaquín Mariano de Mosquera-Figueroa y Arboleda-Salazar (14 December 1787 – 4 April 1878) was a Colombian statesman and a Founding Father of Colombia who served as the 2nd president of Gran Colombia. Mosquera also served as Vice President of the Republic of New Granada. During the administration of President Simón Bolívar, he was named as the 1st Envoy Extraordinary and Minister Plenipotentiary to the nascent states of Peru, the United Provinces of South America, and Chile with the purpose of creating unity amongst the South American nations.

He was overthrown as President in 1830 in a military coup by General Rafael Urdaneta.
