= Francisco de Paula Santander =

Colombian military and political leader (1792–1840)

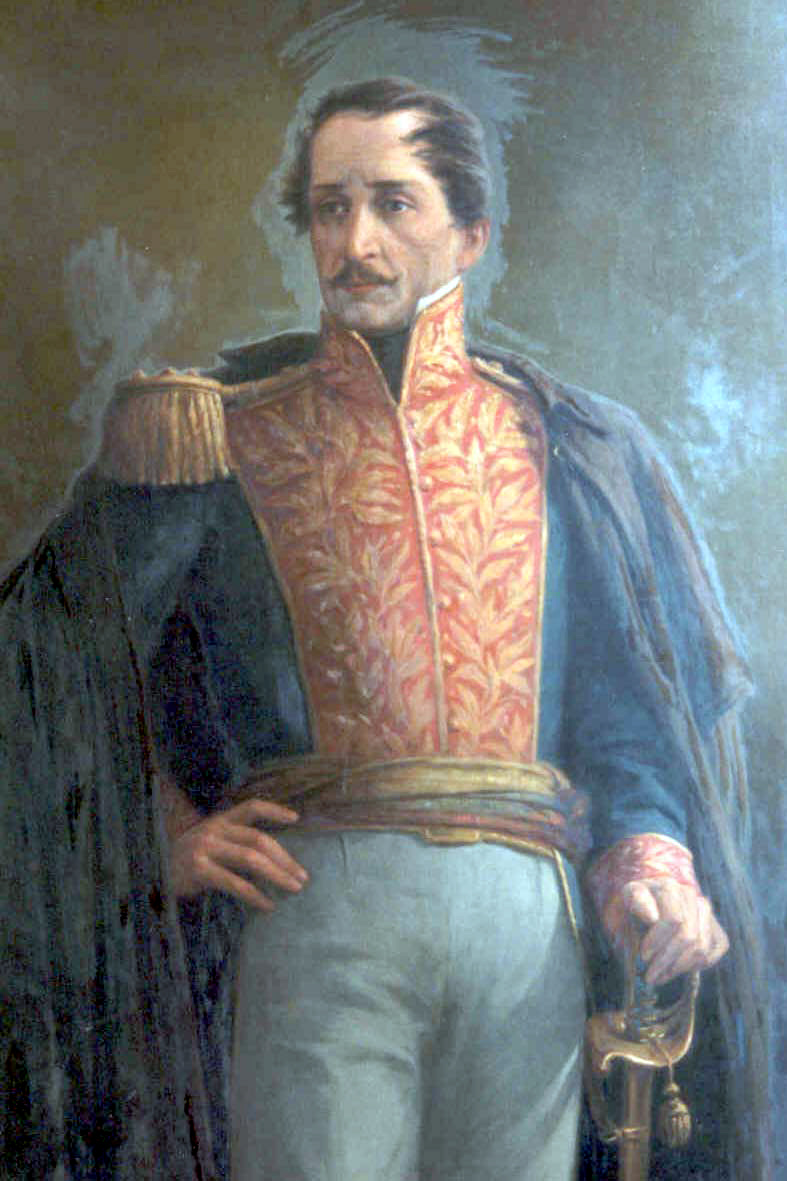
- Oil painting by Ricardo Acevedo Bernal.

1st President of the Republic of New Granada
- In office October 7, 1832 – April 1, 1837
- Vice President: José Ignacio de Márquez
- Preceded by: Office Created
- Succeeded by: José Ignacio de Márquez

5th Vice President of Gran Colombia
- In office November 3, 1821 – September 19, 1827
- President: Simón Bolívar
- Preceded by: José María del Castillo
- Succeeded by: Domingo Caycedo (1830)

Personal details
- Born: Francisco José de Paula Santander y Omaña; 2 April 1792 Villa del Rosario, Pamplona Province, Viceroyalty of New Granada
- Died: 6 May 1840 (aged 48) Santa Fe de Bogotá, Cundinamarca, Republic of New Granada
- Party: Federalist
- Spouse: Sixta Pontón
- Children: Francisco de Paula Jesús Bartolomé, Clementina Santander y Pontón, Sixta Tulia Santander y Pontón
- Education: Colegio Mayor de San Bartolomé Universidad santo Tomás
- Awards: Cross of Boyacá; Order of the Liberator; Medal of the Liberators of Cundinamarca
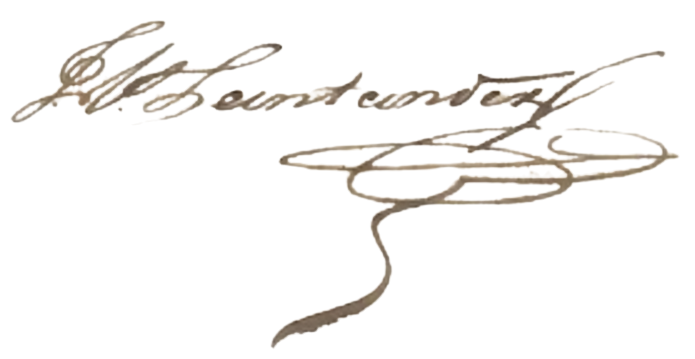
- Signature

Military service
- Allegiance: Cundinamarca 1810-1812 United Provinces of New Granada 1812–1816; Venezuela 1816-1818; United Provinces of New Granada 1818-1819; Gran Colombia 1819
- Branch/service: New Granadan Army (1810-1816); Liberator Army of New Granada and Venezuela (1816-1819); Gran Colombian Army (1819)
- Years of service: 1810-1819
- Rank: General of Division
- Battles/wars: Conflicts: Spanish American wars of independence; Colombian War of Independence; Battle of San Victorino; Battle of La Grita; Defense of the Cúcuta Valley (1813); Battle of Llanura de Carrillo; Reconquest of Cúcuta (1814); Spanish reconquest of New Granada; Battle of Cachirí; Invasion of Casanare (1819); Bolívar's campaign to liberate New Granada; Battle of Paya; Battle of Gámeza; Battle of Vargas Swamp; Battle of Boyacá; Venezuelan War of Independence

Francisco José de Paula Santander y Omaña (April 2, 1792 – May 6, 1840) was a Neogranadine military and political leader who served as Vice-President of Gran Colombia between 1819 and 1826, and was later elected by Congress as the President of the Republic of New Granada between 1832 and 1837. Santander played a pivotal role in the Colombian War of Independence being one of the main leaders of the Patriot forces and helped lead the Patriot Army alongside Simón Bolívar to victory. He is often credited with creating the legal foundations for democracy in Colombia, as well as creating the country's first system of public education. For these reasons he is considered a National Hero in Colombia and has thus commonly been known as "The Man of the Laws" ("El Hombre de las Leyes") as well as the "Organizer of Victory" ("El Organizador de la Victoria").

Santander was born into a wealthy criollo family in Villa del Rosario, in the Viceroyalty of New Granada and spent most of his formative years there. In 1805 he left his home to continue his education in the Viceregal capital of Santa Fe de Bogotá, while finishing his studies on July 20, 1810 he joined in the revolutionary fervor that would be movement for New Granadan Independence. At the age of 18 Santander abandoned his studies to begin his military career fighting for the Patriot cause against the Royalists initially with the Centralists but switched sides and became an officer in the army of the Federalist United Provinces of New Granada.

In 1813 he was wounded and captured during the civil war between the Federalists and the Centralists, but was released to serve under Manuel del Castillo y Rada and Simón Bolívar in the defense of the Cucuta Valley from the Royalists. For the next 3 years Santander defended the valley from Royalist Incursion until he was defeated at the Battle of Cachirí during the Spanish Reconquest of New Granada. With the collapse of the first republic, he fled to the Casanare Province and joined forces with Venezuelan Patriot forces there first under the command of José Antonio Páez, and then joined Bolívar's forces in Guayana in 1817. Under the command of Bolívar during the 1819 Campaign to Liberate New Granada, Santander led his troops valiantly at the battles of Paya, Gameza, Vargas Swamp, and at Boyacá liberating his homeland from Spanish Rule.

With the creation of Gran Colombia in December 1819, Santander was initially chosen as Vice-President of Cundinamarca, in 1821 at the congress of Cúcuta he was elected as Vice-President of Gran Colombia with Bolívar as President. For the next 6 years, with Bolívar away on campaign, Santander became acting president of the new nation, using his administrative skills to create the foundations for the new republic. In 1827 political differences between him and Bolívar led to a rupture in their relationship, culminating in 1828 when Bolívar accused of him of having masterminded a plot to assassinate him. Though no evidence was ever found to corroborate his guilt, Santander was sentenced to death. His death sentence was commuted to exile, and Santander was stripped of his titles and positions before being sent into a four-year exile in Europe and the United States. After the dissolution of Gran Colombia, in 1832 the newly established congress of the Republic of New Granada elected him as President where he served his term from 1832 to 1837. After the end of his presidency, he was elected as a representative for Bogotá in the chamber of representatives. His health declined shortly thereafter; he died on May 6, 1840.

== Early life (1792–1810) ==
Francisco José de Paula Santander y Omaña was born in Villa del Rosario, in the Pamplona Province of the Viceroyalty of New Granada not far from Cúcuta, on April 2, 1792. 11 days later on April 13 he was baptized at the Santa Ana chapel in Villa del Rosario. His parents were Juan Agustín Santander Colmenares who was governor of the rural town of San Faustino de los Ríos as well as a cocoa and coffee plant grower, his mother; Antonia Manuela de Omaña Rodríguez. Both were descendants of aristocratic Spanish families who had settled in the New Kingdom of Granada. The couple had two children before Santander, a boy Pedro José and a girl Josefa Teresa who died in their infancy. 2 years after Santander was born the couple had another girl Josefa Dolores. Santander grew up in a family that was both socially and economically privileged and that had a large influence in the region where he was born through the ownership of various haciendas and properties.

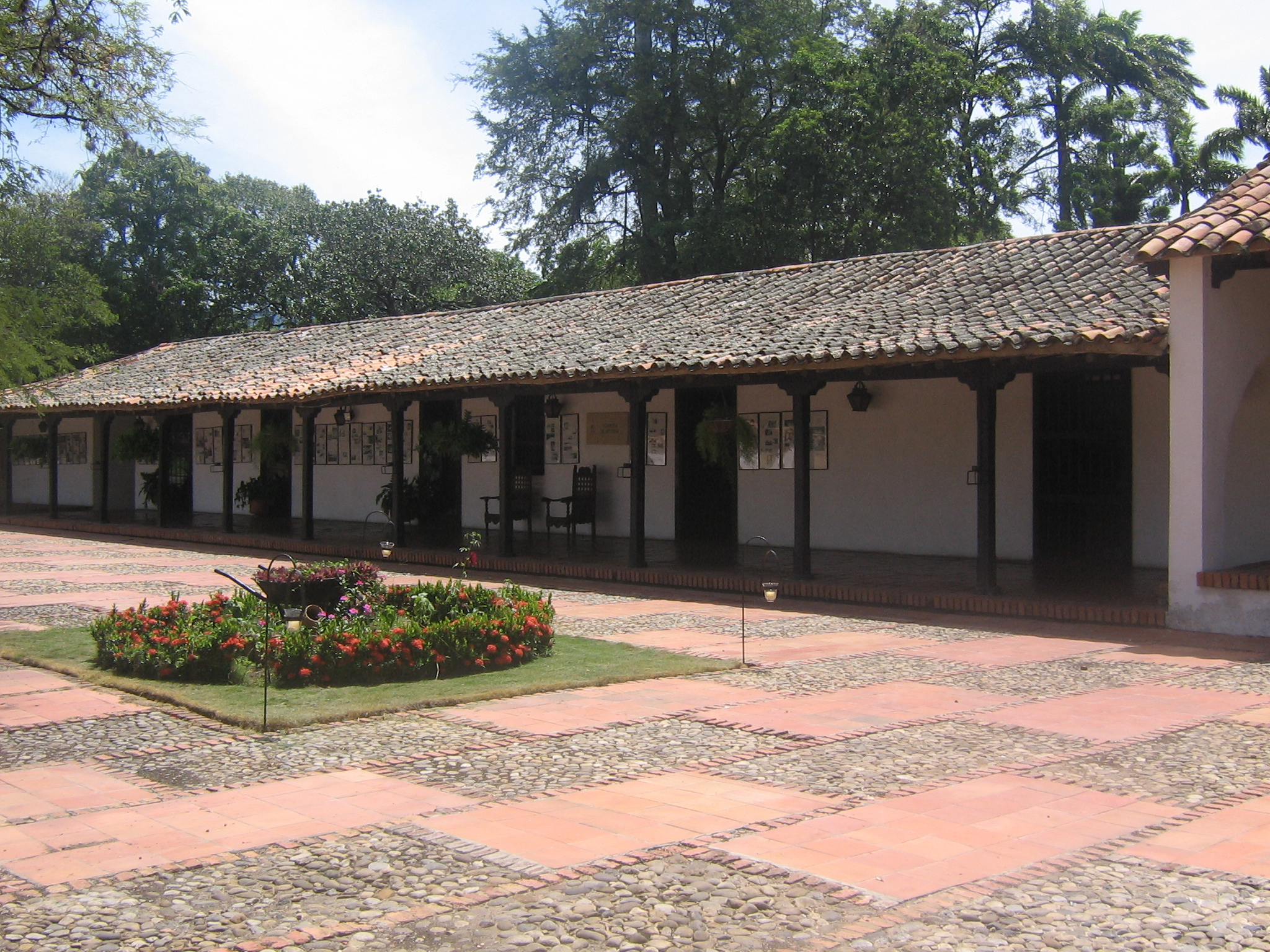
Casa Natal del General Santander, Santander's birthplace

He received his primary education in a private school in Villa del Rosario, and upon becoming literate became a voracious reader poring through the various books his father's library had. He was also taught Latin by a local clergyman. Even at a young age Santander noticed how there was considerable lack of schools for public education as well as trained teachers in the New Kingdom of Granada. Discrimination based on social class often meant that the majority of the population was excluded from a getting even a primary education, and even those who did receive one were taught a very basic curriculum that was often a victim of censorship by colonial authorities. This left a lasting impact on Santander who later in life as President would implement a policy of promoting creating public schools with trained teachers operated by the government for the general population.

As Santander's family was an aristocratic one, it was common for the family to send their children to receive further education in the viceregal capital, Santa Fé. In the capital there were essentially 2 career paths offered by higher education institutions, those being Law or Religion. Juan Agustin Santander then asked his brother-in-law, the priest Nicolás Mauricio de Omaña y Rodriguez, to try to get the young Francisco de Paula a scholarship at the Colegio de San Bartolomé. Santander now 13, was sent by his father Juan Agustin to Santa Fe in 1805 and enrolled in the Colegio Mayor y Seminario de San Bartolomé.

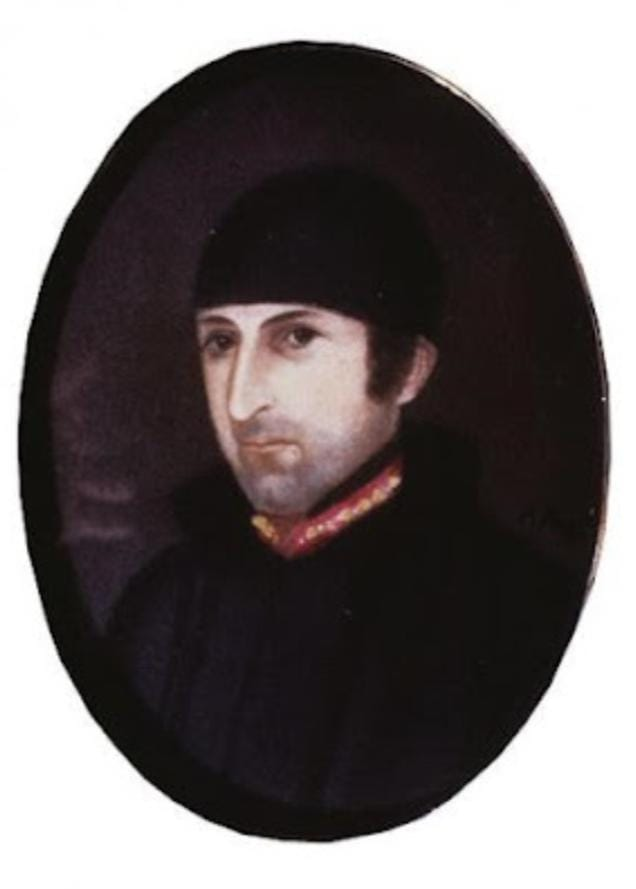
Nicolás Mauricio de Omaña. Santander's maternal uncle and signer of the Colombian act of independence.

After arriving in Santa Fe, the young Francisco de Paula lived in the Colegio de San Bartolomé where his maternal uncle lived at that time, the priest Nicolás Mauricio de Omaña, who occupied the position of vice-rector of that establishment. Nicolás Mauricio de Omaña was a well known figure in the city, and was friends with many of the enlightened and cultured criollos of Santa Fe. His teachings had a large influence over the young Santander who wrote in his memoirs that his uncle had taught him " To know the justice, convenience and need for these countries to shake Spanish domination."

This sentiment was shared by many of the professors at the Colegio Mayor de San Bartolomé who would also play a big role in the independence movement. By 1808, Santander had received his secondary education and began to study law at the University of Santo Tomás. The education he received at the Colegio de San Bartolomé left a big impact on Santander. The legal doctrines extracted from the Roman, Spanish and Indian laws shaped his thinking. This helped him to later organize Colombia with exemplary method and order.

== Military career ==
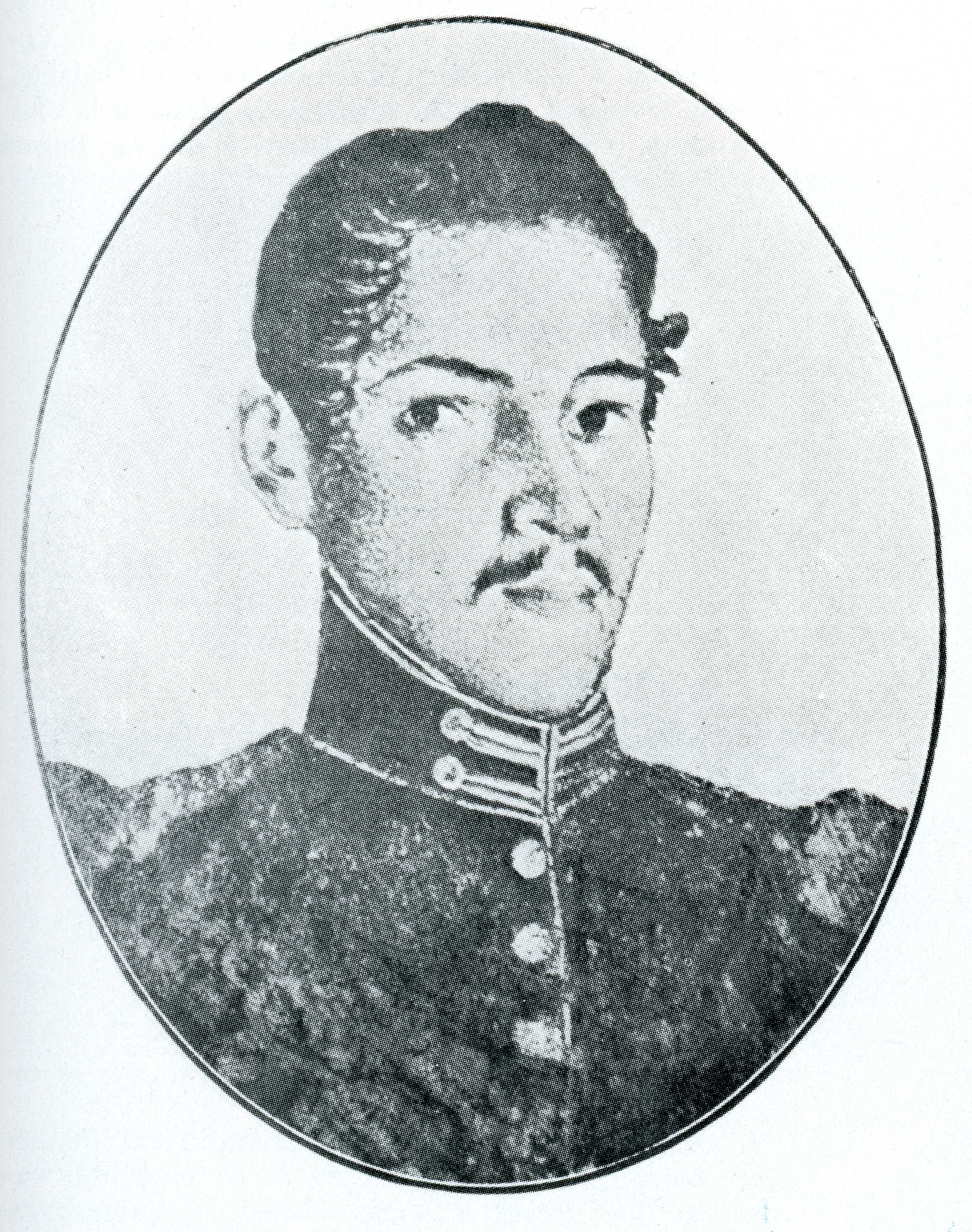
An engraving based on a miniature, showing a young Santander in 1812 as a lieutenant.

As a young law student, Santander was finishing his studies at the University of Santo Tomás when he witnessed first hand the events of the Revolt of July 20, 1810, which would be later known as the cry of independence, where the criollos of Santa Fe revolted against to the Viceregal government of Viceroy Antonio José Amar y Borbón and began the establishment of juntas in 1810, which began the process of independence in New Granada. At the age of 18, Santander abandoned his studies and enlisted on October 26, 1810, as a sub-lieutenant in the National Guard ("Guardias Nacionales") infantry battalion as a flag-bearer. In 1811 the Government of Santa Fe, seeking to impose their hegemony over the other provinces that had begun to form their own independent juntas, deployed a number of military expeditions to incorporate these provinces. The young Santander would be part of a military expedition of some 300 men under the command of cartagenian captain Manuel del Castillo y Rada to the Mariquita province. This expedition would culminate successfully with the Mariquita province being successfully annexed into the Cundinamarca province, with this his unit returned to Santa Fe in June 1811. After returning to Santa Fe Santander was assigned to the Military Inspection Unit of Santa Fe. In January 1812 general Antonio Baraya returned to Santa Fe after having defeated the Royalist forces who had tried to reconquer the independent cities of the Cauca Valley in the northern part of the Popayán Province, as a result of this Santander was made his secretary on January 17, 1812.

That same year a conflict would arise between the 2 main groups of New Granadan Patriots; the Centralists in Santa Fe under the leadership of Antonio Nariño and the Federalists under the leadership of Camilo Torres who had set up a federal congress in Tunja, this congress had gathered delegates from 5 provinces in New Granada to form a confederation through the Federation Act of 1811 creating the United Provinces of New Granada. Nariño refused to recognize the authority of this Union and thus dispatched a force under the command of general Antonio Baraya to dissolve the congress in Tunja and reincorporate these provinces back under the authority of Santa Fe. Santander as Baraya's secretary, was part of this force as they set out in April 1812, Baraya however along with all his officers including Santander would defect to the Federalist United Provinces of New Granada and recognized the authority of the Federal congress. Santander would then be promoted two times in quick succession by the Federal congress, being promoted to lieutenant on May 25, 1812 and to captain of June 1, 1812.

The tensions between the Federalists and Centralists would eventually burst into a civil war in December 1812 when the two armies faced each other at the Battle of Ventaquemada where the Federalists turned back another Centralist attempt to advance on Tunja forcing them to retreat back to Santa Fe. The Federalist Army while victorious did not pursue Centralists immediately, and waited a week before doing so as they reached Santa Fe in January 1813. At the Battle of San Victorino on January 9, 1813 the Federalists encircled the city taking key vantage points such as Monserrate from the west while penetrating the city through the San Victorino neighborhood. Despite the Federalists having a numerical advantage, Nariño had successfully mounted an effective defense since the Federalists hadn't pressed their advantage after Ventaquemada resulting in a resounding defeat for the Federalists. Captain Santander was wounded and taken prisoner along with 23 other officers as a result of the battle, his wounds were so grave that he himself said: "That only a miracle of Providence could have saved me."

Santander would remain in captivity for just a month as he was later exchanged in a prisoner swap when the Centralists and Federalists signed a truce ending the conflict as both sides became alarmed by the Royalist threat in the south and north of the country. After this exchange he arrived in the federal capital of Tunja on February 10, 1813, where congress promoted him to the rank of sergeant major.

Cúcuta Campaign

After receiving his promotion, Santander was then assigned to the 5th Battalion of the Union under the command of now Colonel Castillo y Rada, with orders to march at once to the city of Cúcuta in order to repel an imminent Royalist Invasion from Venezuela. He arrived in the valley in March 1813 after the neogranadine victory at the Battle of Cúcuta had repelled the Royalist Invasion. This victory had been the work of exiled Venezuelan Colonel Simón Bolívar, this would be the first time the two would meet. Santander later participated in a cross-border incursion into Venezuela on April 13 when he and his men under Castillo y Rada attacked the remaining Royalist forces that had been repelled in the Battle of Cúcuta at La Grita. Santander took command of the 1st and 3rd companies of the 5th battalion of the Union and attacked the royalist left flank. The attack was a success and allowed the patriots to take control of the towns of La Grita and Bailadores. Santander's actions in the battle earned him a commendation by part of Bolívar in his official report to the Federal congress. However he and Castillo y Rada would come into conflict with Bolívar's plans to conduct an invasion to liberate Venezuela, with Santander and Castillo y Rada argued that deploying the New Granadan army across the border on a liberation campaign would deprive the republic of its forces necessary for its defense. The Federal Congress in Tunja however would promote Bolívar to general and authorize the expedition disregarding both their opinions on the matter.

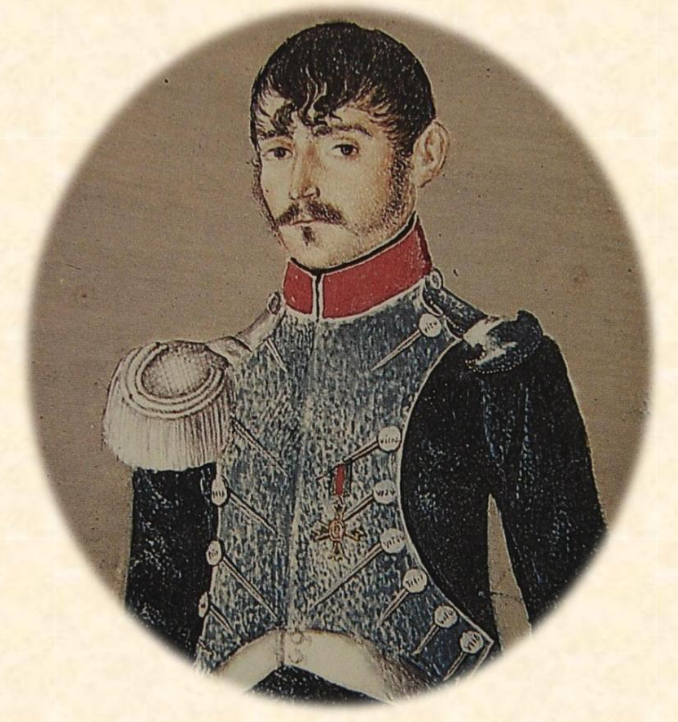
Santander as a Lieutenant Colonel, miniature by José María Espinosa.

After receiving confirmation that Bolívar would indeed begin his campaign to liberate Venezuela, Castillo y Rada resigned his command in protest and returned to Cartagena where he was named military commander there. This left his army, the 5th Line Battalion, now under the command of Manuel Ricaurte who also resigned leaving the command of the troops to Santander. Santander did not accompany Bolívar in his campaign but instead remained per Bolívar's command in Cúcuta to defend it from a possible threat to Bolívar's rear. The circumstances as to why Santander remained in Cúcuta and did not accompany Bolívar are controversial, in a letter to the president of the Federal congress he states.

Stopped my march to the army of Venezuela for the commissions I received from the supreme congress, before the term of fifteen days was fulfilled, for which General Bolívar allowed me to come to Cúcuta from La Grita to carry the particular interests of the 5th battalion that I then commanded accidentally, the command of the Cúcuta valley fell on me by chance, which I never requested.

This account coincides with the that of Colombian historian Jose Manuel Restrepo who wrote that:

To defend the valleys of Cúcuta, he left two hundred and ninety men commanded by Sergeant Major Francisco de Paula Santander, of the militias of Cartagena, who had been claimed the Government of that province. Given these provisions, Bolívar extended his campaign headquarters to give independence and freedom to Venezuela, his beloved homeland".

However, another account provided by Bolívar's Irish aid-de-camp Daniel Florence O'Leary describes that there was serious confrontation between the two with Bolívar in a severe tone ordering Santander to "march at once" barking at him "You have no choice in the matter! March! Either you shoot me or by God, I will certainly shoot you." This account of events has been called into question due to the fact the O'Leary was not present at the time of these events and wouldn't arrive in Venezuela to join Bolívar until 1818 some 5 years later.

On May 14, 1813, Bolívar departed for Venezuela with the army of the United Provinces and would begin what would be later known as the Admirable Campaign. In Cúcuta, for the defense of this strategic border city 21-year-old Sergeant Major Santander had been officially left with 80 soldiers, 72 working muskets, and 1800 paper cartridges, this force would be later augmented to around 200 with troops recruited from the area. Over the next months Santander would wage a brilliant campaign in defending the city from Royalist Invasions dispatched from their stronghold in Maracaibo. He often had to do this at a numerical disadvantage as well as with a limited supply of munitions. He fought off these attempts at Loma Pelada on August 13, San Faustino on September 30, and Limoncito and Capacho on October 6 and 10, however due to his small force and limited number of munitions he was unable to pursue these attackers allowing them to regroup in Venezuela.

From October 10 to 18, a large Royalist force under the command of Bartolomé Lizón invaded the valley from four different points with 1,300 troops in what would be known as the Battle of Llano de Carrillo. With only 260 troops, Santander convened a war council with his officers and realizing that their position was untenable given the number of enemy troops, ordered the evacuation of Cúcuta and began a withdrawal towards Pamplona positioning himself in an area known as Llanura de Carrillo. Lizón was informed of this by Royalist sympathizers when he took Cúcuta and attacked Santander's forces on October 18 in only what could be described as a massacre. Of the 260 men Santander had, only 50 survived, many Patriot prisoners were executed by order of Lizon along with their supporters in Cúcuta and Pamplona including many of Santander's own family members.

The defeat at the Llanura de Carrillo and the loss of Cúcuta was bitter event for Santander he wrote to Congress "asking for a court martial" which the congress refused, he then asked "that he be removed from the army for his failures" which was refused as well. In Tunja congress named Gregor MacGregor as the commander of the Army of the North and dispatched him immediately, Santander would be his second-in-command. In early 1814, this army waged a successful counteroffensive to reconquer the Cúcuta Valley and forced Lizon back into Venezuela. For his actions during the counteroffensive, congress promoted Santander to Colonel on May 31, 1814. MacGregor would not remain commander for long however as he resigned his commission due to serious health problems.

=== Reconquest of New Granada ===
In 1814, Ferdinand VII of Spain deployed an expeditionary force to reconquer Venezuela and New Granada, this force of over 10,600 men was under the command of General Pablo Morillo, a veteran of Peninsular War who had fought alongside the Duke of Wellington. They departed Spain in early 1815 arriving off the coast of Venezuela in early April, in August he began a campaign to Reconquer New Granada, by laying a 105 day siege to the republican stronghold of Cartagena. After the city fell in December of that year Morillo began a march into the interior following the Magdalena River, this was done in tandem with General Sámano's forces from the south and Colonel Sebastian de la Calzada's forces marching from Venezuela. In July 1815 prior to his siege of Cartagena, Morillo landed his force in the royalist province of Santa Marta while most of his force would participate in the siege he also raised a division of 1,000 men known as Volante under the command of brigadier Pedro Ruiz de Porras, who would take the vital river port of Mompox, doing so that same month. Porras's next objective would be to take the city of Ocaña which was along the main route to Santa Fe. The government of the United Provinces alarmed by this ordered Colonel Santander to march from Cúcuta to the city of Ocaña and recruit a force capable of retaking Mompox. Santander arrived in Ocaña in late July with 200 lancers and 200 fusiliers the government also sent him 150 troops under the command of colonel José Maria Vergara y Lozano as reinforcements. At Ocaña, by August Santander had a force of around 500 men, but a plan to attack Mompox was considered unfeasible as Porras had received more reinforcements from Morillo and had fortified the port. To make matters worst Colonel Calzada invaded New Granada entering the Casanare Province and defeating general Urdaneta's defense forces there allowing him to march north towards the Cúcuta valley on November 25 and quickly took the provincial capital of Pamplona on the 26. Santander now found himself caught between two forces, with Morillo's forces to the north and Calzada to south, on December 22, 1815 he skillfully withdrew his men south through an abandoned path that led to Girón eventually arriving in Piedecuesta. There he was able to meet up with Custodio Garcia Rovira who had been named commander of the Army of the North, where they would attempt to defend the main route that led to the capital of the United Provinces.

While Santander wanted to position the army more towards Bucaramanga, Garcia Rovira overruled him and instead placed the army in a defensive position on the Páramo de Cachirí an area in between Bucaramanga and Pamplona. Sebastian de la Calzada's army continued their march toward Bucaramanga and met the New Granadan army at the Battle of Cachirí on February 21 and 22. The New Granadan army was no match for the troops of Spanish Army, the republicans received a heavy defeat, of the 2,000 strong army that Rovira had commanded, only 300 were able to escape including Rovira and Santander. With the road to Santa Fe practically open, the Spanish continued their march. Rovira was then relieved of command with French born Brigadier General Manuel de Serviez now in command of what remained of the republican army. Serviez had been ordered by the republican government to retreat with what was left of the army to the south where the rest of the government had fled, however Serviez decided against this and decided to take the army and withdraw towards the plains of Casanare where he could reorganize the army and fight a war of guerillas against the Spanish.

The republican government then ordered Santander to prevent Serviez from doing this however, he too disobeyed this order and agreed with Serviez's plan. During their retreat they were pursued by Spanish Colonel Miguel de la Torre who was able to catch up to them at times, such as at the Negro River crossing where the Spanish attacked the patriots during the ir crossing at the Negro River. The battle was a disaster with most of the army still unable to cross Serviez was forced to cut the bridge which allowed the few on the other side to escape. Serviez's dramatic retreat to the plains of Casanare finally concluded when they reached Chire in July 1816 where they were met with General Rafael Urdaneta's Venezuelan cavalry. The retreat had saved many of the best of the neogranadine officer corps such as Santander and Jose Maria Cordova, and other offices who would form an important part of the army that would fight in the Liberation Campaign of 1819. The other part of the republican army, who had fled south, would be defeated at the Battle of Cuchilla del Tambo with many of their officers perishing in battle or executed along with almost the entirety of the officials that made up the government of the First Republic.

With that the First Republic ceased to exist, apart from a small area in the plains of Casanare.

=== Apure Campaign of 1816 ===
After arriving in the llanos and joining up with Urdaneta's forces, the beleaguered patriot forces withdrew further into the vast plains. In the vast and sparsely populated eastern Llanos of New Granada there were three groups of Patriot forces that operated in the area, although they did so independently of one another. One group was led by Venezuelan Colonel Miguel Valdés, commander of the Casanare troops or army of the East, whose main operations center was located in the town Guasdualito. The second group was commanded by colonel Nepomuceno Moreno, a native of Casanare and the titular governor of Casanare, and the third was the one led by the Venezuelan general Rafael Urdaneta. As mentioned, this last group had received the remains of the neogranadine troops commanded by General Serviez and Colonel Santander after their retreat.

The diverse amount of groups and their leaders led to a chaotic situation akin to anarchy as there was no unified command structure for these troops. In order to solve this Colonel Valdés proposed a meeting between the various leaders in the town of Arauca which lay on the Arauca river on the border of Venezuela and New Granada. Serviez and Urdaneta agreed and sent Santander to the meeting as their representative.

On July 16 the meeting was convened in the town of Arauca where the delegates formed a junta. At the meeting Colonel Valdés expressed the impossibility of continuing his command, given his declining health. The junta then unanimously agreed to appoint Fernando Serrano, former governor of the Pamplona province, as president. The lawyer Francisco Javier Yañez was appointed secretary general minister and Generals Serviez and Rafael Urdaneta as advisors to the civilian government.

The junta then decided to vote on who would be given command of the unified army, with colonel Santander being voted as commander of the army. Santander was commander for 2 months, during his short command the patriots withdrew further east crossing the border into the llanos of Apure in Venezuela as the Spanish penetrated further into the llanos.

In September 1816, Lieutenant Colonel José Antonio Páez would end up taking control of the army, despite his inferior rank, Santander agreed with this decision and followed his orders. Páez assumed control of the army as well as provisional civilian government that was under president Serrano who Páez ordered that he cease his duties. As a result Serviez and Urdaneta were relieved of their positions as advisors to the government and put back into active duty. Páez then went about reorganizing the army into 3 Cavalry divisions with the 1st division under the command of general Urdaneta, the 2nd division under Serviez, and the 3rd division under the command of Santander.

By the end of September Páez and the Army of Apure went on the offensive, they headed for the town of Achaguas where the Spanish army had placed their forces.

On October 8, 1816 the patriot army clashed with the Colonel Francisco Lopez's Spanish cavalry at the Battle of El Yagual. Santander and his division fought valiantly in the bloody battle, conducting a violent cavalry charge that threw the enemy into the river. The battle was resounding victory for Páez's army of Apure, who captured horses, weapons, and uniforms from the Spanish that were badly needed. Despite the victory tragedy would strike again when General Serviez was murdered only a few weeks after the battle. The death of Serviez left Santander as the most senior Neogranadine officer within the Army of Apure. Santander spent the rest of the year fighting under Paesz in the Apure campaign of 1816.

In 1817, the 25 year old Santander requested a passport to travel to Guyana to join General Simón Bolívar's forces who had been waging a renewed a campaign against the Spanish forces under Morillo. Bolivar made him part of his general staff as well as his aid-de-camp. For his actions during the Center Campaign of 1818 campaign on July 16, 1818, Bolívar awarded him the Order of the Liberators, one month later he was promoted to Brigadier General on August 12, 1818.

=== Liberation Campaign of 1819 ===
See Main Article: Bolívar's campaign to liberate New Granada

With the war in Venezuela essentially a stalemate by late 1818, Bolívar sought to end the stalemate by shifting his tactics and opening a new front against Morillo by conducting a military operation to invade New Granada which had been firmly under Spanish control since 1816. With the majority of the Royalist Army in Venezuela, and a large contingent of his Patriot army composed of New Granadan exiles eager to liberate their homeland, occupied New Granada seemed like a promising target that could tip the war in his favor. In preparation for this campaign, Bolívar named Santander as Commander of the Vanguard of the Liberator Army of New Granada and gave him 1,200 muskets and gave him the task of raising and organizing an army in the eastern plains region of the Casanare Province in New Granada. Santander left the Guayana Region on August 27 arriving in the Casanare Province on November 29, 1818 along with other New Granadan officers who Bolívar had assigned to his command to assist in the creation of the army.

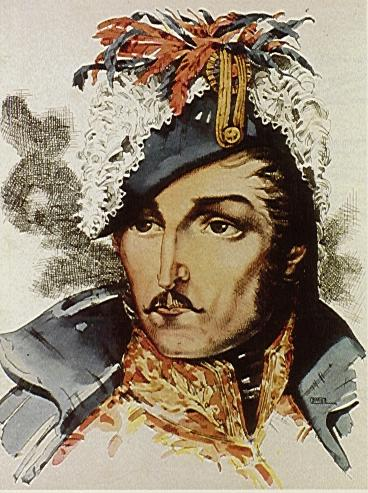
Water Color of General Santander by Master Santiago Martinez Delgado

Upon arriving in the province the situation was critical as the Casanare Province, while one of the few regions not under full Spanish control, was a "miserable province, with no resources and no capable men." The New Granadan Patriot forces in the province were in complete chaos upon his arrival due to infighting and lack of resources especially between the 2 most senior officers, Nonato Perez and Antonio Arredondo, who had been in the province prior to Santander's arrival. Santander was able to eventually impose his authority over the two as "his presence inspired confidence, as well as his emphasis in unity in order to solve the situation" his officers began the arduous task of recruiting and training this new army. He also established a provisional government in the name of the previous United Provinces of New Granada, with it being subservient to the previous constitution of 1815, with Casanare as its sole province and Pore as the provisional capital of New Granada and, while at the same time formally establishing its alliance with Venezuela and recognizing Simón Bolívar as captain-general of both the New Granadan and Venezuelan armies on December 18, 1818.

During his time as commander in chief in the Llanos, Santander took to the task of establishing supply caches for the army, he also ordered the production of uniforms and 1,000 straw hats. He also set up system of rudimentary logistics for food provisions to keep his troops fed. He imposed strict discipline on his new army through a permanent war council and instituting a system of passports that all soldiers were required to have on their person to control their movements and prevent desertion. By February 1819, Santander along with his officers such as the young Sergeant major Joaquin Paris as well as Lt. Colonels Antonio Obando and Jacinto Lara, were able to build a respectable force of around 1,200 men divided in 2 infantry battalions the Cazadores Constantes Battalion and the First Line Battalion of New Granada as well as a cavalry contingent recruited from the local population. These efforts did not go unnoticed however, Spanish intelligence had informed Morillo of Santander's presence in Casanare since late 1818, Morillo informed the Viceroy of New Granada Juan de Samano as well as the commander of III Division of the Royalist Army tasked with the protection of that kingdom, Colonel Jose Maria Barreiro of Santander's presence. In early 1819 Morillo ordered Barreiro to invade Casanare as soon as possible to destroy the possible insurgent threat.

Barreiro crossed the eastern andes with an army of around 1,800 troops in late March 1819 and invaded the province, the Royalist army took the deserted town of Pore on April 9. Santander's strategy during this campaign would be one of evasion as he withdraw deeper into the Llanos in order to stretch Barreiro's supply line as well as exhaust his troops who were not accustomed to the harsh climate of the Llanos. This strategy would succeed as the campaign became harsh on the royalist troops who lacked sufficient supplies for a further penetration into the vast Llanos, these troops were also subject to ambushes by mobile Patriot troops, and with the rain season only one month way Barreiro decided to withdraw across the andes back into the central New Granada, the withdrawal was complicated further by Santander who ordered a small counteroffensive against the Royalists which further demoralized Barreiro's men. On April 17 Barreiro's army eventually withdrew back to central New Granada and garrisoned the army in Tunja to wait out the winter rain season, the failure of this campaign was further confirmed when Santander ordered colonel Obando to attack the garrison at La Salina which Barreiro had left behind to cover his retreat with the attack being a victory for the patriots resulting in the capture of the garrison. News of successful defense of the province was sent to Bolívar with Santander stating in his letter dated April 21.

Barreiro, general commander of this expedition, has seen with his own eyes that it is not with three or four thousand men that Casanare is conquered, and that it is not with terror that he can erase the feelings of patriotism that her own troops have for freedom of their homeland.

In late May, Santander notified Bolívar of his final preparations and the favorability of the local population's support for a liberation campaign, he also dispatched one of his officers Colonel Jacinto Lara to Bolívar's camp to report these advances in person. Bolívar upon receiving these reports made his decision on May 20, and revealed this plan to his officers on May 23 who agreed to the plan. He then marched his army from their camp in Manteca in the Apure region of Venezuela on May 27, 1819. On June 4 Bolívar's army crossed the Arauca river and reached town of Tame on June 12, where he met with Santander's forces. At Tame, Bolívar organized the army as well as informed his officers of the military strategy for the campaign. The combined New Granadan and Venezuelan army of around 2,500 troops was named the Liberator Army of New Granada and Venezuela comprised two divisions, with Bolívar as commander-in-chief, General Soublette as chief-of-staff, Santander as commander of the vanguard division and General José Antonio Anzoátegui commander of the rearguard division. While at Tame, Bolívar finalized the route the army would take, whilst he originally planned to the route through La Salina de Chita, Santander suggested taking the route that passed through the Parámo de Pisba which was the fastest and least guarded route but also the most difficult and challenging. Bolívar agreed with this suggestion and on July 17 the army left Tame and marched towards Pore in the direction of the eastern andes mountain range. The campaign, conducted during the winter rain season which flooded the Llanos, made marching extremely difficult for the army.

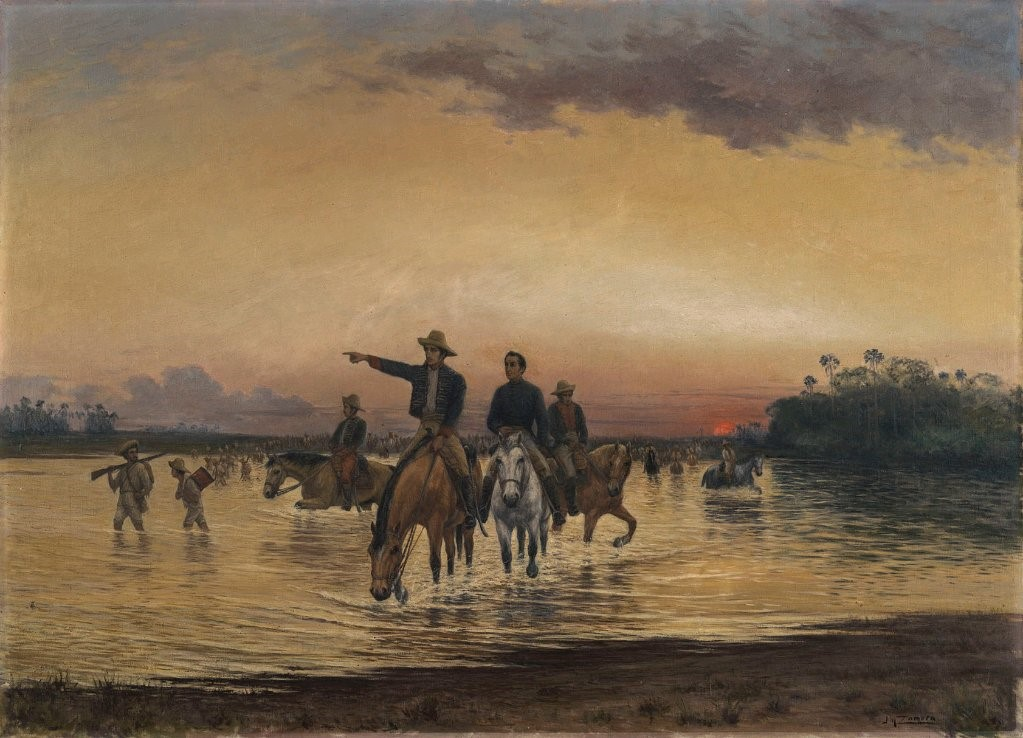
Santander and Bolívar crossing the eastern Llanos (Plains) to reach the Andes.

As his division was at the front of the army, the vanguard division was usually one day's march ahead of the rest of the army. As a result they often made first contact with Royalist forces such as when they came upon a 300 strong Royalist garrison at Paya on June 27. Santander ordered the commander of the Cazadores battalion under Lt. Colonel Antonio Arredondo to attack the Royalist through a flanking maneuver on the right while he would lead the rest of the vanguard and march down the main road to support him. After a few hours of combat the Spanish forces withdrew and the Patriot Forces continued onward, however that same day June 27 Bolívar, one-days march behind, sent a letter informing Santander of the exhaustion of the Venezuelan troops who were also skeptical of the success of the campaign. Bolívar considered calling the campaign off, however Santander responded by stating he preferred "a certain death in the planned operation against the enemy then retreating back to the llanos" this sentiment was also supported by the officers of the vanguard division as well as General Anzoátegui. The determination demonstrated by Santander and his officers inspired confidence in Bolívar and the campaign continued.

From July 1 to 6 the army began their grueling crossing of the Andes Mountains through the Paramo de Pisba enduring extremely harsh conditions and its limits tested as they endured cold temperatures and constant rain storms further complicated by the abundant lack of uniforms the soldiers causing many to perish. Santander and his division arrived on the other side on July 5 reaching the town of Socha in the Tunja Province, with the rearguard arriving on July 6. The army was in a sorry state as it lost almost all of its horses, cattle, as well a number of men and equipment with Santander describing that "the army was a dying body." Over the next few days elements of Santander's Vanguard division were deployed to take the surrounding towns of Corrales and Gameza, there they skirmished with the forces of Barreiro's royalist army on July 10. On July 11, a larger battle occurred, the Battle of Gámeza, where Santander led his division in an attempt to take the Gámeza bridge. As his forces were at the front of the army they bore the brunt of the Spanish musketry preventing them from taking the bridge,

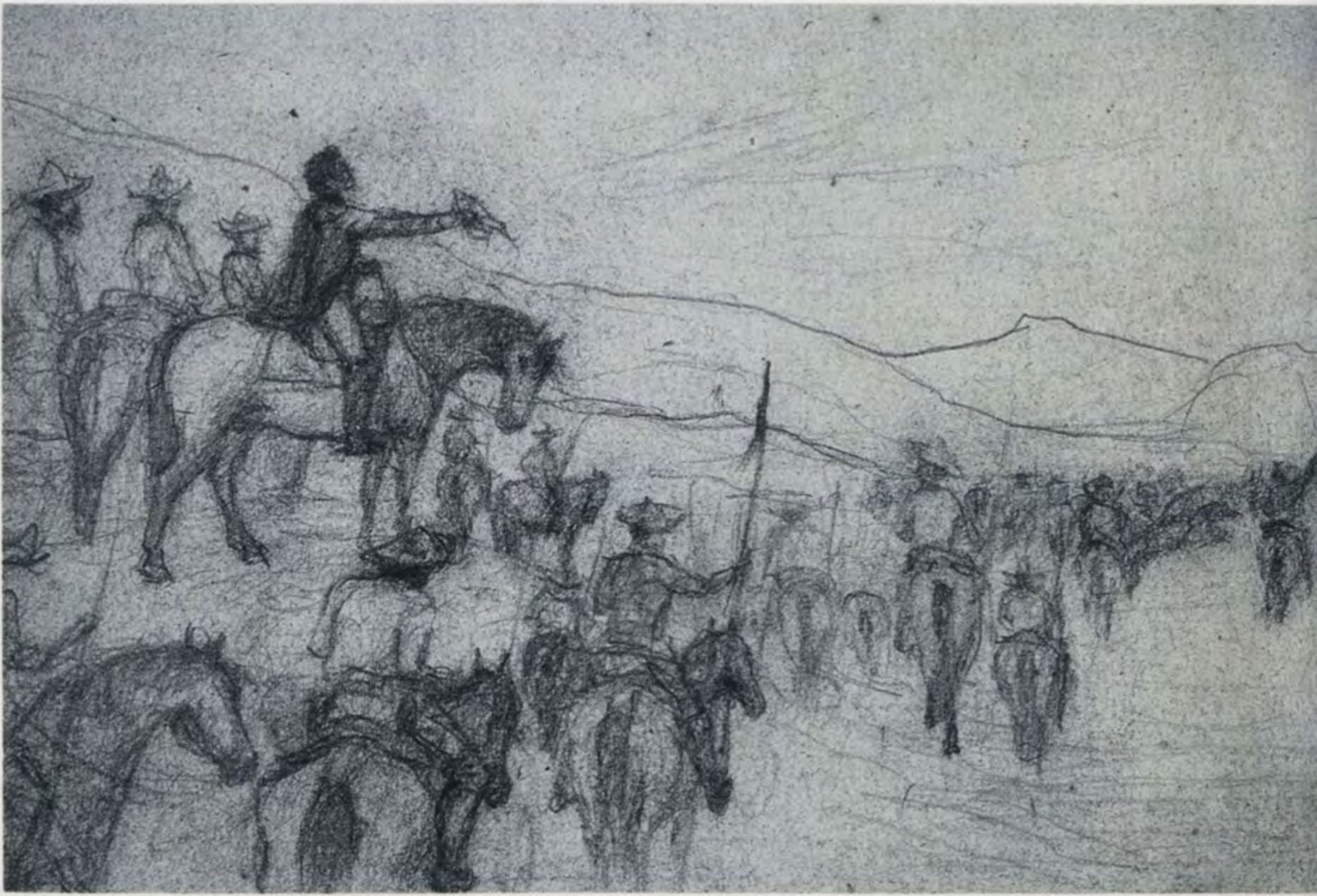
A drawing made by Jose Maria Espinosa circa 1824, depicting Bolívar and Santander at the Battle of Boyacá.

At Gámeza on July 11, Santander himself would be lightly wounded as a Royalist musketball grazed his neck with Sergeant Major Paris urgently coming to his side to review his wound. This battle would also result in the death of the commander of his Cazadores infantry Battalion, Colonel Arredondo, who would be replaced by Joaquin Paris now promoted to Lieutenant Colonel. On July 25 he participated in the Battle of Vargas Swamp leading his Vanguard Division on the left flank trying take Picacho Hill, the fight was difficult as they were pushed back 3 times by Spanish King's 1st infantry battalion. After 5 hours of grueling combat Santander supported by Colonel James Rooke of the British Legion led a desperate bayonet charge that finally dislodged the Spanish off the hill, this was done as Colonel Juan José Rondón led his lancers in an uphill charge on Cangrejo Hill resulting in a hardfought Patriot victory. Of the battle Santander later stated that:

The glory of Vargas belongs to Colonel Rondon and Lieutenant Colonel Carvajal, both from the plains of Venezuela. To no one else was it granted but to them, on that glorious day those renown brave men were given honorable mention in the army bulletin.

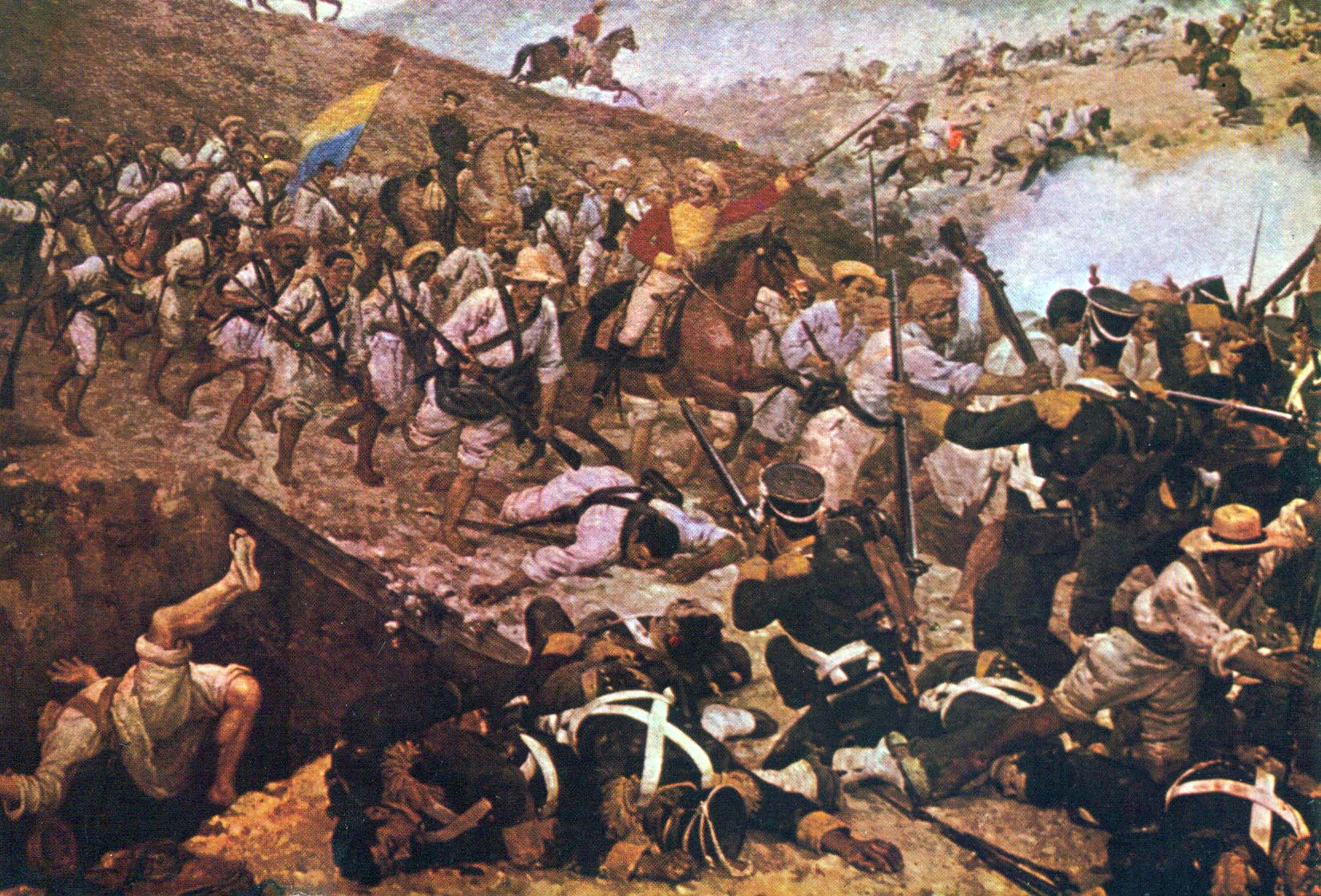
Santander (wearing red, on top a horse) leads the bayonet charge across the Boyacá Bridge, by Martín Tovar y Tovar (1890)

After the victory at Vargas Swamp, the Patriot Army tricked the Royalists by conducting a feint march back to Venezuela while on that same night they conducted a countermarch allowing them capture the important city of Tunja behind the backs of the Royalists who now had their main line of communication with the capital Santa Fe, severed, Santander commented that this action "without dispute what sealed the success of our campaign". Barreiro hurriedly marched towards Tunja but informed of its capture, took the alternate route around the city through Motavita during a night march in the rain in order to gain the lead on the race to the capital. On August 7 at 9am Bolívar informed by his spies of Barreiro's march, observed the Royalist army march towards the Boyacá Bridge, he then ordered Santander and Anzoátegui to intercept the Royalists before they could cross the bridge. At the Battle of Boyacá, Santander would play a pivotal role as his men spotted the Royalist Vanguard force at the nearby Casa de Teja guarding the bridge as they waited for the bulk of the Royalist Army to arrive. The two forces spotted each other and exchanged fire with the Royalists charging after the Patriots thinking they were a small observation force. Santander marching down theCamino Real with the rest of the patriot vanguard upon seeing this unfold ordered Lieutenant Colonel Joaquín París commander of the "Cazadores" Battalion to attack the Royalist forces at the Casa de Teja. The Cazadores forced the Royalists to fall back towards the bridge, eventually being forced across the other side as the two forces faced each other. Santander then ordered Colonel Antonio Bejar to take some forces down the river and cross it in order to attack the Spanish vanguard from the rear. While this was happening Anzoátegui marching behind Santander, spotted the main bulk of Royalist Army and immediately attacked causing panic and decimating the main force. Bejar's forces eventually managed to ford the river and were approaching the rear of the Royalist vanguard force, the two forces engaged in battle. When this occurred Santander led a bayonet charge across the bridge with a company from the First Line Battalion of New Granada to deliver the final blow ending the battle around 4:30pm as the Patriot Army decimated the Royalist Army, culminating the campaign.

Santander along with the rest of the Patriot army entered triumphantly into Bogotá on August 10, the Viceroy and the rest of the Spanish government had fled the city after receiving new of their defeat at the Boyacá Bridge. In recognition of his actions during these battle, 11 days later he was promoted to the rank of General of Division, the equivalent of a modern major general. During the victory ceremony that was held in Bogotá on September 18, he was paid tribute to alongside the other generals of the army and awarded along with all those who participated in the campaign the Cross of Boyacá (Modern equivalent: Order of Boyacá).

== Santander's presidency ==
With most of New Granada liberated from Spanish rule, on August 10 Bolívar named Santander as military governor and commander of all forces in the Province of Santa Fe. On September 11 he became Vice President of New Granada and was given "all the broad powers in all branches of government" Bolívar also gave him the task "of liberating the country from Spanish domination at all costs." Shortly after Bolívar departed for Angostura to propose the union of liberated territories of Venezuela and New Granada to the congress there.

After Bolívar left, on October 10, 1819 Santander ordered the execution of 38 Spanish officers captured at the Battle of Boyacá, among them Colonel José María Barreiro. These executions caused a great deal controversy, as Bolívar had the month prior sent a letter to Viceroy Sámano in Cartagena proposing a prisoner exchange. Santander attempted to justify the executions by stating that the presence of these prisoners in the capital presented a threat as the city was lightly defended as Bolívar had taken the rest of the army with him to Venezuela and other units had been deployed to the Caribbean coast where the Spanish still had control. Another justification was that the executions were carried out in accordance with the War of death and revenge for the executions of the generation of 1810 that were executed during Morillo's regime of terror during the Reconquest of New Granada in 1816. While in private Bolívar, expressed his sadness and disapproval through a letter he wrote in Pamplona to Santander, he refrained from doing so publicly. The ramifications of these executions would continue to be a stain on Santander's career for the rest of his life.

On December 17, 1819 the delegates of the Congress of Angostura approved the fundamental law that united New Granada and Venezuela and established the Republic of Colombia(referred to as Gran Colombia). The territories of New Granada and Venezuela became the departments of Cundinamarca and Venezuela, with Santander as Vice President of Cundinamarca and Juan Germán Roscio and Vice President of Venezuela.

Come 1820 Vice President Santander dealt with crippling fiscal situation that the department suffered from, as commerce and trade were at a standstill and state funds depleted. With great difficulty he managed to administer and send funds to the army that was currently on campaign in the Caribbean coast under Colonels Jose Maria Cordova and Hermógenes Maza. .

Midway through 1820, Santander attempted to resign as Vice president and return to active duty in the army, Bolívar however refused to accept his resignation considering that no one else could replace him and that no other person had the merits or know how to occupy such an important position. Santander tried again to resign this time in the hopes of receiving a diplomatic position in Chile or in Argentina however Bolívar again refused to accept it.

=== First administration ===
In October 1821, after the Constitution of Cúcuta was proclaimed, Santander was elected by the newly gathered Congress as Vice President of Gran Colombia, in a heated election, where he overcame the other strong candidate for the post, the former leader of Cundinamarca, General Antonio Nariño, by a margin of 38 to 19 votes. Santander was placed in charge of the government of New Granada, while Bolívar returned to Venezuela to propose the union of Venezuela and New Granada to the Venezuelan congress.

Since General Simón Bolívar, despite being the President of the new republic, decided to continue leading the republican forces in their southern campaigns in Ecuador and Peru, the office of President of Gran Colombia was entrusted to General Santander. The Constitution mandated that the vice-president remain in Bogotá in such cases and handle the functions of the executive branch of government. As acting ruler, Santander had to deal with a grave economic crisis—that was one of the direct consequences of a decade of constant warfare—pockets of royalist sentiment in Gran Colombian society, supplying the logistics of the continuing military operations, administrative and legislative reactivation, and the establishment of internal political divisions. During this period Santander definitely moved towards a centralist political philosophy and upheld the legitimacy of the Cucutá Constitution against federalist and regionalist pretensions. Santander also made a concerted move toward free trade. He removed and reduced many taxes which had been left in place from Spanish rule and opened ports to all foreign nations. He also created incentives for immigrants, including expedited naturalization—applicants were allowed to leave the country for up to six months without interrupting their legally "required" stay—and land grants. Bolívar undid many of Santander's actions after he returned in 1826 and reassumed his position as president, often ruling through emergency decree.

== Political differences ==
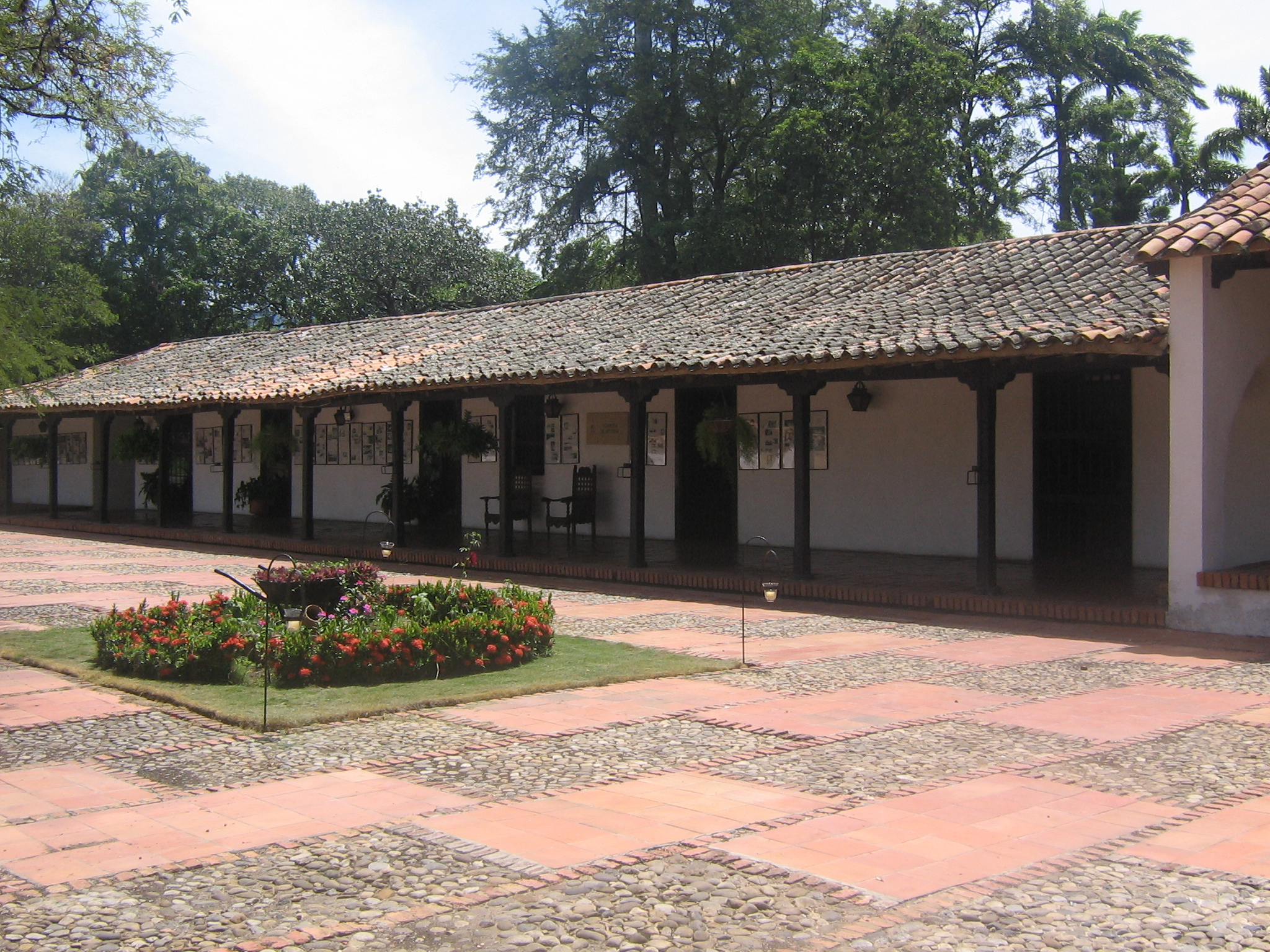
House of Francisco de Paula Santander

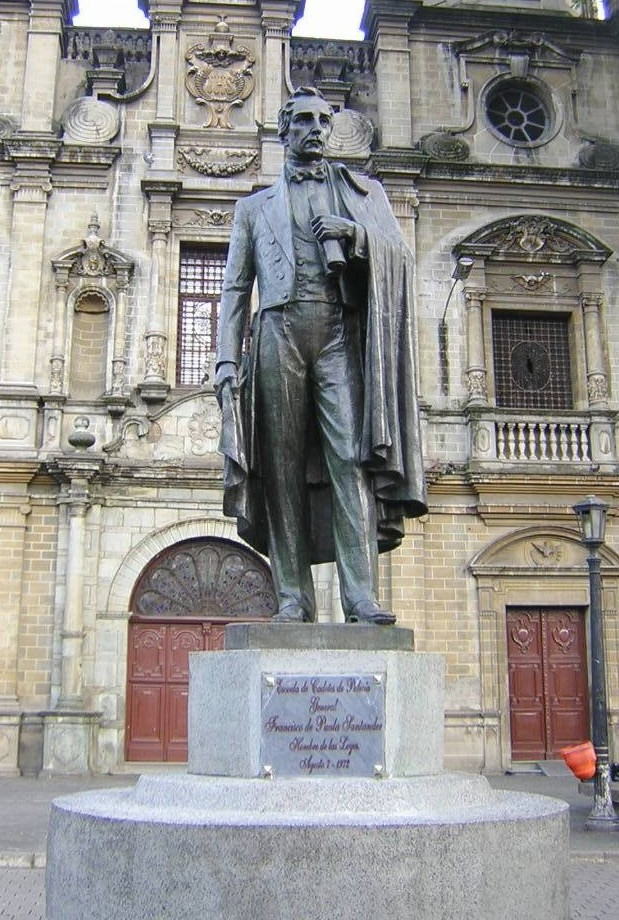
Statue of Francisco de Paula Santander in Medellín

Initially, Santander and Bolívar were considered close friends and allies, but gradually political and ideological differences emerged. It is considered by modern scholars that Santander believed in the sanctity of constitutional government and in the rule of law, perhaps to a greater degree than Bolívar, who would have allegedly thought that those concerns were secondary to what he perceived as the actual needs and solutions that historical circumstances demanded, and thus could be subject to flexibility.

In 1826, when the first Venezuelan uprising occurred, Santander and Bolívar came to disagree about how to handle the situation. Santander believed that the rebels, led by José Antonio Páez and federalist sympathizers, should be punished or at least made to openly submit to the established constitutional order. When Bolívar, who had returned from Peru and reassumed his executive powers, arranged for an amnesty and placed Páez as supreme military chief of the department of Venezuela, Santander felt that the central government's authority and the rule of law were being undermined by the constitutional President himself in a personalist manner.

Santander also disagreed with Bolívar's attempt to promote a reform of the 1821 constitution before it was legally permitted (the constitution stated that ten years had to go by), and especially with Bolívar's attempted nationwide implementation of the constitution that he had previously drafted for Bolivia, which among other provisions called for a lifelong presidency with the ability to select a direct successor. In Santander's opinion, this could place the country dangerously close to monarchism..

In 1828, growing internal conflicts continued. Santander was elected as one of the delegates to the Ocaña constitutional convention, during which both his supporters and other opposition political factions blocked Bolívar's attempts at reform. This led to the sudden exit of many of the delegates supporting Bolívar, who disagreed with the Convention's potential outcome.

These events eventually led Bolívar to declare himself dictator in August of that year, while the office of the vice president was abolished.

Santander and his political sympathizers felt that this act betrayed liberalism and the ideology of the Age of Enlightenment, some even comparing Bolívar to Napoleon or Julius Caesar.

On September 25, 1828, Bolívar escaped an assassination attempt. Among those blamed was Santander who, in a quick military trial headed by General Rafael Urdaneta, was originally sentenced to die without specific proof of his participation in the event, but Bolívar pardoned him, commuted his sentence and ordered his exile.

Even today, the details are not totally clear and the evidence appears to be inconclusive. Some historians consider that Santander knew about the possibility of an assassination attempt and initially opposed it, but eventually allowed it to happen without his direct participation. This position was eventually assumed by Santander himself later in his life. Others consider that Santander may have been involved in the plan from the beginning as it would benefit him politically, though no direct proof of his role has been found.

== Exile ==
After receiving his sentence, Santander left Bogotá on November 15, 1828, where he was taken as a prisoner to the city of Cartagena de Indias where he planned to board a ship and go into exile. This plan would change however as when he arrived near outskirts of the city in December 1828 his guards were instructed by General Mariano Montilla, chief of the Magdalena district, that Santander would not be allowed into the city itself but instead be taken to the fortress of San Fernando de Bocachica. Although Santander was sentenced to exile by the Council of Ministers, Montilla together with Urdaneta decided to detain him illegally and imprison him in the fortress where he would remain December 4 to 19. Santander, who had left Bogotá sick, saw his health decline due to conditions of the cell where he was placed, he sent several letters complaining about the situation to both Bolívar and Montilla.

On December 19, he was transferred to the castle of San José de Bocachica where his health worsened and his access to paper and ink were also restricted by order of Montilla, in addition his letters were also censored. Friends of Santander attempted to help him by writing letters to Bolívar protesting on his behalf. Santander would remain imprisoned in the castle for almost a year until General Antonio José de Sucre intervened and got into a heated argument with Bolívar about the matter. Bolívar finally acquiesced to Sucre's demands and the result of this was the transfer of Santander aboard the frigate Cundinamarca to Puerto Cabello in Venezuela on June 16, 1829. He arrived on August 19 in Puerto Cabello, where Paéz granted him a passport to be allowed to go into exile aboard the merchant ship María, on August 27 arriving at the port of Hamburg about 48 days later on October 15, 1829.

During his stay in Europe, Santander traveled to several countries, visiting museums, factories, libraries, and met with several personalities from the Old Continent who treated him as if he were a head of state. During his stay in Hamburg he had his portrait taken by a local newspaper in the city. After a while he moved to Brussels where he met the Liberator of Argentina General José de San Martín, the two spoke for several hours about the state of affairs in South America, this would not be the only time the two would meet while in Europe. Of the meeting between the two, Santander remarked: "I have treated General San Martín. I think he is a good soldier, very alive and shrewd, but a friend of monarchies" From there he traveled to France, arriving in Paris on February 17, 1830, during his stay in the French capital he was presented to French society thanks to General Joaquín Acosta who was in the city by a government commission. During his stay in Paris he met the Marquis de La Fayette, the two had several conversations and also had the opportunity to visit his house, of this meeting the general commented in a letter to Bogotá:

"The first time I saw the venerable Lafayette, I was frozen with admiration and respect; this gentleman has given me such a benevolent and distinguished welcome, that I am confused"

Notably Lafayette made several serious efforts to reconcile Bolívar and Santander, he even sent a long and meaningful letter addressed to Bolívar that did not arrive on time, by the time it arrived in Bogotá, Bolívar had already departed for the coast to go into exile.

After a while, he left France to travel to England; in London he was able to meet the English philosopher and utilitarian Jeremy Bentham a person who Santander deeply admired and followed. Bentham invited him to a meal at his residence in London. Bentham gifted him several books and brochures, Santander was delighted to meet him and visited him again the following year. Shortly after he departed England for a brief stopover in the Netherlands on his way to Germany where he returned to Hamburg to visit some friends from there he traveled to Prussia arriving in the capital, Berlin, on July 16, 1830. Whilst in Berlin he met several members of the Prussian aristocracy, the most notable of them being Alexander Von Humboldt where the two spoke about Colombia and Bolívar during a lunch offered at the house of the Prussian nobleman. He also toured several German cities such as Dresden and Munich, in September 1830 he crossed the border with Italy and traveled through Verona and then arrived in Venice on October 6, 1830.

When he arrived in Florence on October 13, he was received by Grand Duke Lepold II and Princess Maria Ana Carolina of Saxony in his palace who took a certain interest in the Colombian general, asking him about his life, Colombia, and if he was thinking of returning to South America. He also met Camillo Borghese, Prince of Sulmona, who accompanied him during his visit to the different museums and art academies in the city. Santander left the city on Monday, December 6 in a rented carriage, accompanied by Francisco García, a native of Havana, traveled to Rome where he had the opportunity to visit the Vatican, the monuments, and the Roman ruins. Santander left Rome on February 23, 1831 arriving in Florence, it would be there where he learned of the death of the Bolívar, writing down in his diary:

"Today I read in the Journal du Commerce of February 21 the death of General Bolívar near Santa Marta on December 17, 1830. A Loss for Independence"

When one of his servants, José Delfín Caballero, commented with joy about the news of Bolívar's death, Santander responded angrily "In America only the miserable can rejoice in Bolívar's death."

Santander returned once again to Paris in April 1831, on the way to the French capital he traveled through Switzerland. In June he returned to England where he ate with Bentham once again before leaving for Scotland where he arrived in Edinburgh, then he went to Ireland before returning for the third time to Paris. In Paris he met with Tomás Cipriano de Mosquera who presented General Santander to the court of Louis Philippe I of France on September 16, 1831 where he had a placid conversation with the king and queen.

Later, in an attempt to be closer to New Granada, Santander traveled to the United States where he arrived in New York City on November 10, he then traveled to Philadelphia. During his stay in the US he became friends with Joseph Bonaparte, Napoleon's older brother. He also had the opportunity to visit the capital of Washington D.C., visiting the White House where he met and conversed with President Andrew Jackson.

== Return from Exile ==
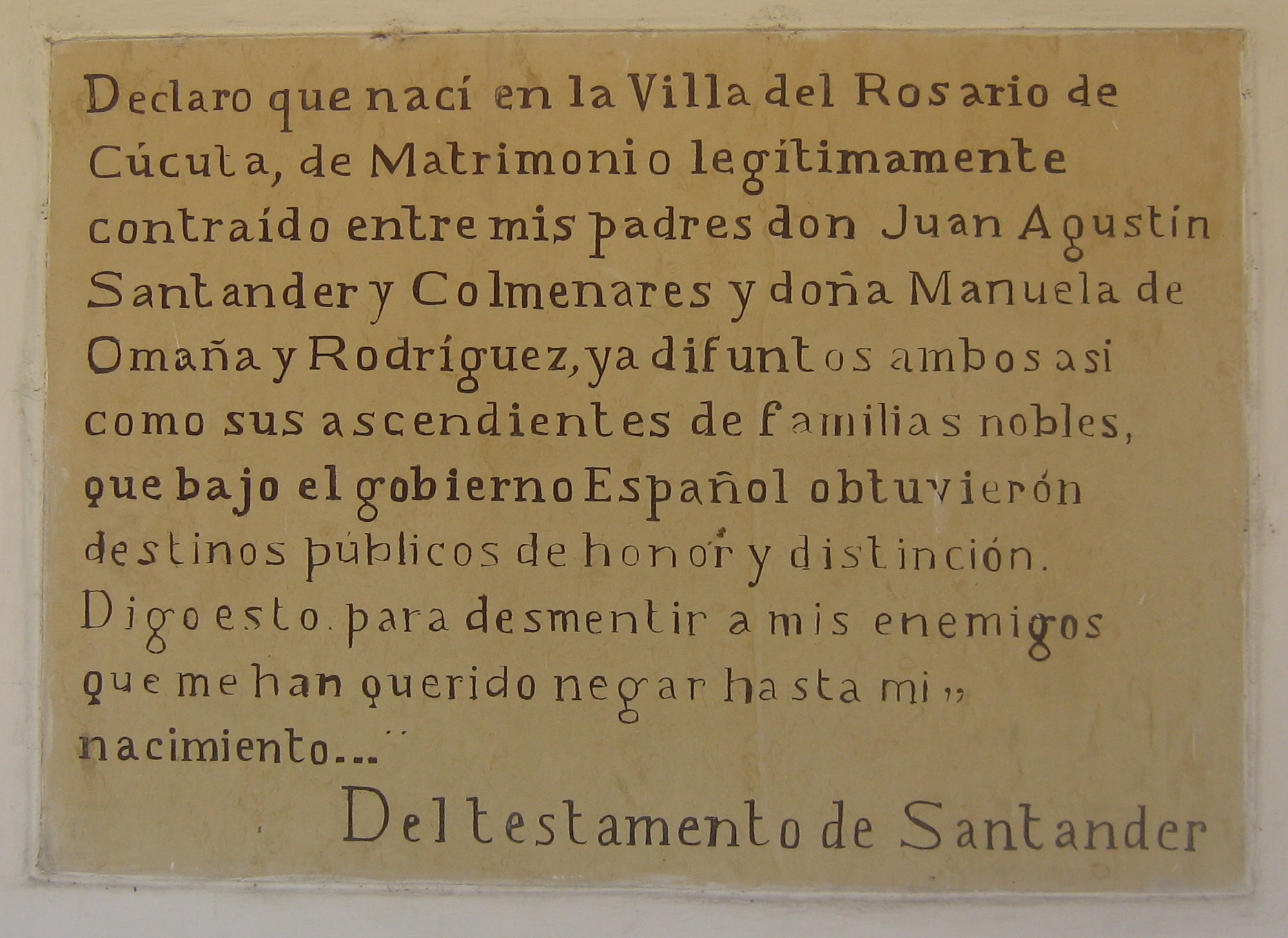
Testament of Francisco de Paula Santander: I declare that I was born in Villa del Rosario de Cúcuta, of the legitimately contracted marriage between my parents Mr. Juan Agustin Santander y Colmenares and Mrs Manuela de Omaña y Rodriguez, both already deceased as well as their ancestors of noble family, that under the Spanish government obtained public destinies of honor and distinction. I say this to counter the lies of my enemies, who have wanted to deny me even my birth.

After Bolívar died and Gran Colombia broke up, Santander returned from exile in 1832 and served as President of the Republic of New Granada from 1832 to 1836. Santander had spent a great deal of time in Europe absorbing how the ideas of the Enlightenment were affecting European politics in the early 19th century. As his diary shows, Santander was an assiduous art and music lover, and attended the opera almost every evening. In 1830, he was in Brussels, where he saw various performances of La muette de Portici, whose liberal political implications caused a riot that sparked the Belgian Revolution, although he was in Berlin in August 25 when the riots occurred. When he returned, these concepts influenced his decisions to a great extent.

== Second Administration ==
In 1832, Santander was elected by Congress as President for a second term. This administration was quite different from the first, in that he moved away from free trade and stressed an alternate form of protectionism. He first reverted most of his original changes from Bolívar's undoing, although some were devalued somewhat. He did not close New Granada to international trade, but rather sought safety for New Granada under the auspices of industrialized nations, instead of discouraging trade with them. He set up economic contacts in eleven United States cities, hoped that by creating strong ties with them, he would promote industrial development in New Granada while avoiding the use of high tariffs, which he inherently disliked.

During his second administration, just like he did during his first administration, he ordered the execution of most of the rest of the Spanish officers still in captivity, who had been saved by Bolívar in the first round of Santander's murderous pursuit; among them General José Sardá. They were executed in Bogotá, on July 23, 1833, in front of Santander himself.

== Later years and death ==
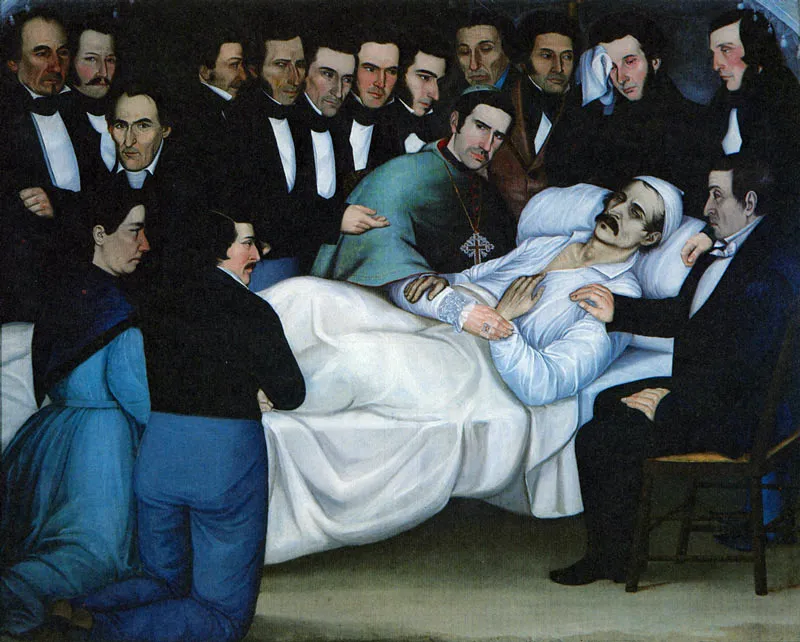
The death of Santander in Bogotá, after a long agony. Making his will, he said: "I wish I would have loved God as much as I loved my country ."

After his term expired, he remained an important and influential political figure and was elected as a representative for the chamber of the representatives of New Granada. Santander attended the sessions in the chamber, but stopped attending in April 1840 when he became gravely ill and became bedridden. From April 27, a diary was kept describing Santander's health's rapid decline. On May 6, 1840 at approximately 6:30 pm, Santander died in his bed surrounded by his friends and family.

== Personal life ==
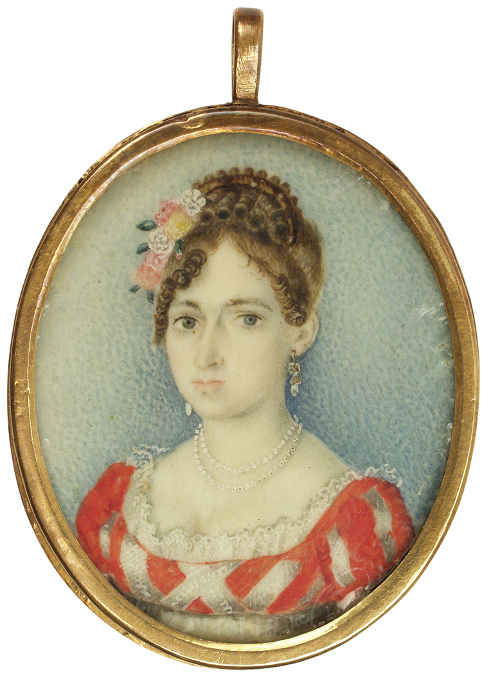
María Josefa de Briceño, Santander's younger sister

Santander was described as relatively tall compared to his contemporaries, as well as having a "good figure" but later in life became more portly. He was also described as having a serious tone and of having good oratory skills when he talked and of having a strong Cucuteño accent. Personality wise, Santander was described as a hard worker and a voracious reader who was serious and behaved much like the military officers of his time, however once he became more involved in politics his personality became more jovial and that of an intellectual. Santander also enjoyed conversing with people and could often be found conversing with anyone regardless of social class or economic status. He often attended parties and balls, and was an avid lover of popular music and art.

While much is known about Santander's public life as he left a rich amount of documents and letters, his personal life remains much of a mystery. Many of his personal letters were burned as per his instructions laid out in his last testament, his letters to his lover Nicolasa Ibáñez were taken by her when she moved to Europe and have never been found.

Santander's father died in 1808 while he was studying in Santa Fe, his mother died in 1819 while he was on campaign during the New Granada campaign of 1819. Santander had only one sibling who survived to adulthood, his sister Maria Josefa, whom he was very close to. On July 19, 1820 she married a Venezuelan man, Colonel José María Briceño Méndez who had been wounded during the war of independence and was the brother of Colonel Pedro Briceño who also took part in New Granada Campaign of 1819 and was wounded at the Battle of Vargas Swamp. He maintained a good relationship with his brother-in-law, who even accompanied him during his march to Cartagena when he was exiled.

=== Marriage and children ===
For much of his youth Santander was often on military campaigns and thus did not marry young like many of his generation. However he did have 5 children, 2 of these being out of wedlock, and 3 with his wife.

His first child, Manuel Santander, was born when Santander was only 19 years old and a second lieutenant in the National Guard Battalion while he was posted in the town of Honda with a local woman of that town. His second son Francisco de Paula Jesús Bartolomé Santander Piehdrahita, was born on August 23, 1833, to Paz Piehdrahita Saenz, despite being born out of wedlock Santander recognized him as his legitimate son in his testament, and also referred to him affectionately by his nickname "Pachito". Pachito followed his father's footsteps and served in the Colombian military, reaching the rank of general before dying in 1916.

Santander's three other children were a result of his marriage to Sixta Pontón Piedrahita who he married on February 15, 1836 in the parish of San Bernardino in the town of Soacha. Amongst historians there is confusion regarding his marriage with Sixta as the relationship between the too was not romantic and was often cold at times. Leading historians speculate that Santander married her out of convenience as her father was one of the richest men in the country. Their marriage produced 3 children, a boy Juan born on December 20, 1836, who died only minutes after being born and who would later be buried in the recently inaugurated Central Cemetery of Bogotá, and two girls Clementina and Sixta Tulia, who both survived into adulthood. Apart from his marriage to Sixta, for almost two decades Santander maintained a relationship with a married woman, Nicolasa de Ibáñez and the few letters that survive show that the two were very in love with each other and even maintained a relationship when Santander was exiled in 1828.

== Legacy ==
Santander's legacy has long been controversial, although his administrative importance in the vice-presidency of Gran Colombia has always been recognized, as well as his military leadership alongside Bolívar and Anzoátegui during the Liberation campaign. His reputation was heavily overshadowed by that of Bolívar, and affected by dark patches, such as the execution of prisoners after Boyacá. Nor after death did he become an object of veneration in his own country. Colombian political divisions did not permit that, as he was often vilified by ultra hard line Conservatives, such as former President Laureano Gomez, due to his opposition to the church and their influence over public education.

However, over time he has been rehabilitated as the division between the nation's two founding fathers has helped prevent party-political cults of Bolívar. In Colombia, Bolívar stands as the Liberator of the nation while Santander as the Lawgiver, the man who built the foundations for democracy in Colombia. Bolívar was "the genius of the activity, Santander was the genius of order," in this sense they were, more than an opposition, a complement to each other.

He is featured as a Comandante General in Sid Meier's Civilization 6, available only to users playing as the Gran Colombia civilization.
