= Isakson =

Isakson is a surname, a variant of Isaacson. Notable people with the surname include:

- Carolina Barco Isakson (born 1951), Colombian-American diplomat, daughter of Carolina Isakson Proctor
- Carolina Isakson Proctor (née Isakson, 1930–2012), American and Colombian artist and philanthropist, mother of Carolina and Virgilio
- Emma Isakson (1880–1952), Swedish newspaper publisher and suffragist
- Finnbogi Ísakson (1943–2005), Faroese journalist, writer, and politician
- Jane Isakson (born 1965), Canadian Olympic biathlete
- Johnny Isakson (1944–2021), American businessman and politician
- Karl Isakson (1978–1922), Swedish painter
- Marcia Isakson (born 1970), American physicist
- Virgilio Barco Isakson (born 1965), Colombian impact investor and LBGTQI+ activist, daughter of Carolina Isakson Proctor

== See also ==
- Frank Isakson Prize for Optical Effects in Solids, research award of the American Physical Society
