= Isaacson =

Isaacson is a surname meaning "son of Isaac", the Biblical figure. Notable people with the surname include:

- Bruce Isaacson (born 1956), American poet and publisher
- Caroline Isaacson (1900–1962), Australian journalist
- David Isaacson, American military officer
- Dean Isaacson (born 1941), American statistician
- Doug Isaacson (born 1957), American politician from Alaska
- Frederick Wootton Isaacson (1836–1898), English politician
- James Isaacson (born 1980), English rugby union football player
- Jason Isaacson (born 1971), American politician from Minnesota
- Jeff Isaacson (born 1983), American curler
- Judith Magyar Isaacson (1925–2015), Hungarian-American schoolteacher, academic administrator, and writer
- Leonard Isaacson (1925–2018), American chemist and composer
- Megan Isaacson, American gospel singer
- Michael Isaacson (born 1946), American composer
- Peter Isaacson (1920–2017), English-born Australian newspaper publisher and military pilot
- Rich Isaacson (born 1964), American music entrepreneur
- Richard A. Isaacson, American physicist
- Robert Isaacson (1927–1998), American art collector, dealer, and scholar
- Thorpe B. Isaacson (1898–1970), American leader in The Church of Jesus Christ of Latter-day Saints
- Walter Isaacson (born 1952), American author, columnist and CEO

== See also ==
- Isakson
