= Diego Betancur Álvarez =

Colombian politician

Colombia Ambassador to Australia
- Incumbent
- Assumed office 30 April 2008
- President: Álvaro Uribe Vélez
- Preceded by: Patricia Eugenia Cárdenas Santa María

Colombia Ambassador to New Zealand
- Incumbent
- Assumed office 17 February 2009
- President: Álvaro Uribe Vélez
- Preceded by: Patricia Eugenia Cárdenas Santa María

Personal details
- Born: 1949 (age 76–77)
- Other political affiliations: Revolutionary Independent Labour Movement
- Spouse: María Emma Rubiano Rivadeneira
- Relations: Belisario Betancur Cuartas (father)
- Profession: Agronomist

Diego Betancur Álvarez (born 1949) is the current ambassador of Colombia to Australia and New Zealand. He is also the son of former president of Colombia, Belisario Betancur Cuartas.

== Political positions ==
Diego Betancur was famous for being a member of the MOIR, a Maoist Left Wing party during the 1980s, even during his father's tenure as President of the Republic on behalf of the Conservative Party. Diego was a staunch supporter of the rights of a legal, unarmed left, to be allowed into the then de facto bipartisan system of Liberals and Conservatives. When the paramilitary from Magdalena Medio began their purge of left wing politicians, Diego Betancur was among the voices that warned against the mistake of how the military and the landowning elites were targeting lawful contradictors as military enemies.

== Ambassadorship ==
On 25 October 2007, the Government reopened the Embassy of Colombia in Canberra, which had been closed since 2002, to fulfil this office, the Government appointed Betancur as Ambassador of Colombia to Australia concurrently accredited as non-resident to New Zealand; previously, the Ambassador of Colombia to Japan, Patricia Eugenia Cárdenas Santa María, served as non-resident ambassador to both Australia and New Zealand. On 14 March 2008 Betancur was sworn in by the Minister of Foreign Affairs Fernando Araújo Perdomo in a ceremony at the Palace of San Carlos in Bogotá. Betancur started his mission with the re-aperture of the Embassy the following April, and presented his Letters of Credence to the Administrator of the Commonwealth of Australia, Her Excellency Professor Marie Bashir, on 30 April 2008 in a ceremony of protocol at Government House, Canberra, and to The Right Honourable Sir Anand Satyanand, Governor-General of New Zealand, on 17 February 2009 in a ceremony of protocol at Government House Vogel.

== Personal life ==
Born in 1949, he is the second child and only son of Belisario Betancur Cuartas and Rosa Helena Álvarez Yepes; his two other sisters are Beatriz (1956) and María Clara (1960). He is married to María Emma Rubiano Rivadeneira.

== See also ==
- Carolina Barco Isakson
- Pedro Felipe Valencia López
