= Rosa Álvarez de Betancur =

First Lady of Colombia from 1982 to 1986

First Lady of Colombia
- In role August 7, 1982 – August 7, 1986
- President: Belisario Betancur
- Preceded by: Nydia Quintero
- Succeeded by: Carolina Isakson de Barco

Personal details
- Born: Rosa Helena Álvarez Yepes; November 15, 1924 Medellín, Antioquia, Colombia
- Died: June 4, 1998 (aged 73) Bogotá, D.C., Colombia
- Party: Liberal
- Spouse: Belisario Betancur (m. 1946)
- Children: Beatríz; Diego; María Clara

Rosa Helena Álvarez de Betancur (née Álvarez Yepes; November 12, 1924 – June 4, 1998) was the first lady of Colombia from 1982 to 1986, as the wife of Belisario Betancur, the 27th President of Colombia.

Rosa Álvarez was born in Medellín, Antioquia. She met Belisario Betancur when she was sixteen, and they married in 1946. They moved to Bogotá, D.C., in 1948, where Belisario began his political career. The couple had three children between 1948 and 1952. Álvarez de Betancur lived in Bogotá, D.C., Soacha, and Spain, accompanying her husband in his various political positions during the 1960s and 1970s.

Álvarez de Betancur became First Lady in 1982, following her husband's inauguration as president. She enjoyed the position and life at the Casa de Nariño, where she served discreetly as First Lady without obstructing her husband's policies. Among her most notable actions as First Lady was her promotion of expanding the coverage of the Colombian Institute of Family Welfare to more areas of the country.

== Early life and family ==
Rosa Helena Álvarez Yepes was born in Medellín, Antioquia, on November 12, 1924, the daughter of Evelia Yepes de Álvarez (née Yepes) and Pedro Luis Álvarez. She married Belisario Betancur at the age of eighteen on January 21, 1946, at the Sacred Heart of Jesus Church in Medellín, a year after graduating from high school at Colegio Pardo Vergara. Three years later, her eldest daughter, Beatriz, was born, followed a year later by her eldest son, Diego, while her youngest daughter, María Clara, was born in 1956.

Honorary titles
Preceded by Nydia Quintero	First Lady of Colombia; 1982–1986	Succeeded by Carolina Isakson de Barco
