= Virgilio Barco Vargas =

Former 27th President of Colombia

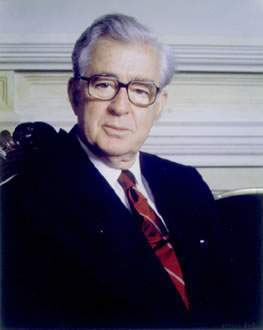
- Barco in 1989

28th President of Colombia
- In office 7 August 1986 – 7 August 1990
- Preceded by: Belisario Betancur
- Succeeded by: César Gaviria

20th Colombia Ambassador to the United Kingdom
- In office 9 November 1990 – 1992
- President: César Gaviria
- Preceded by: Fernando Cepeda Ulloa
- Succeeded by: Luis Prieto Ocampo

18th Colombia Ambassador to the United States
- In office 24 June 1977 – 11 December 1980
- President: Alfonso López Michelsen
- Preceded by: Julio César Turbay
- Succeeded by: Jorge Mario Eastman

6th Mayor of Bogotá
- In office 1966–1969
- President: Carlos Lleras Restrepo
- Preceded by: Jorge Gaitán Cortés
- Succeeded by: Emilio Urrea Delgado

Minister of Agriculture
- In office 23 April 1963 – 6 October 1963
- President: Guillermo León Valencia
- Preceded by: Cornelio Reyes Reyes
- Succeeded by: Gustavo Balcázar Monzón

Minister of Finance and Public Credit
- In office 7 August 1962 – 5 September 1962
- President: Guillermo León Valencia
- Preceded by: Jorge Mejía Palacio
- Succeeded by: Carlos Sanz de Santamaría

8th Colombia Ambassador to the United Kingdom
- In office 16 June 1961 – 1962
- President: Alberto Lleras Camargo
- Preceded by: Alfonso López Pumarejo
- Succeeded by: Alfredo Araújo Grau

Minister of Public Works
- In office 7 August 1958 – 9 November 1960
- President: Alberto Lleras Camargo
- Preceded by: Roberto Salazar Gómez
- Succeeded by: Misael Pastrana Borrero

Personal details
- Born: Virgilio Barco Vargas; 17 September 1921 Cúcuta, North Santander, Colombia
- Died: 20 May 1997 (aged 75) Bogotá, Colombia
- Resting place: Central Cemetery of Bogotá
- Party: Liberal
- Spouse: Carolina Isakson Proctor (m. 1950)
- Children: Carolina Barco; Julia Barco Isakson; Diana Barco Isakson; Virgilio Barco Isakson
- Education: National University of Colombia (Lic, 1942); Massachusetts Institute of Technology (MScCE, 1943; PhD 1953); Boston University (MScS, 1952)
- Profession: Civil engineer
- Website: Official website

Virgilio Barco Vargas (17 September 1921 – 20 May 1997) was a Colombian politician and civil engineer who served as the 28th President of Colombia serving from 7 August 1986 to 7 August 1990.

== Early life ==
Barco was born in Cúcuta in the Norte de Santander Department of Colombia to Jorge Enrique Barco Maldonado and Julieta Vargas Durán. He studied Civil Engineering at the National University of Colombia and at the Massachusetts Institute of Technology from which he graduated in 1943. He entered politics in 1943 when he became a city council member for the Liberal Party in the town of Durania. He was then elected to the lower house of Congress, but went into exile to the US in 1950 because of violence between liberals and conservatives. His daughter, Carolina Barco Isakson (who would later become a Colombian politician herself) was born there. He obtained an M.A. in economics at MIT, where he took classes under Nobel Prize winners Robert Solow and Paul Samuelson in 1952. In 1954 he obtained a PhD in economics from Boston University.

Barco is the grandson of Colombian General Virgilio Barco Martinez, who developed one of the country's largest oil concessions in 1905.

== Political career ==
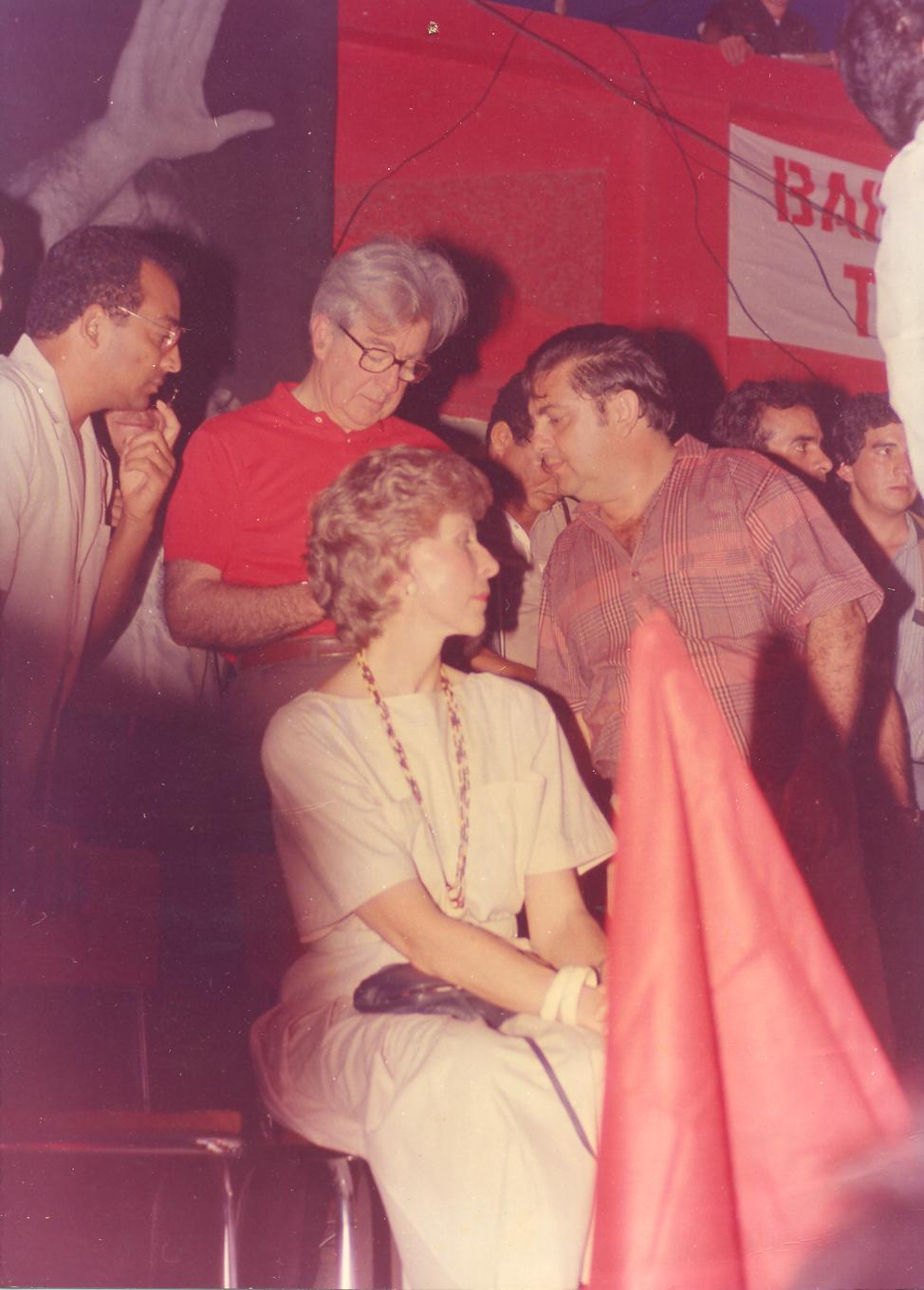
Virgilio Barco and his wife in 1985

Barco returned to Colombia in 1954 to help negotiate the peace process which allowed the formation of the National Front between liberals and conservatives, which lasted two decades. He became a member of the Senate, the upper house of Congress in 1958, left to become the ambassador to Britain in 1961, and returned to Colombia in 1962. He served another term in the Senate until 1966, when he was elected mayor of Colombia's capital, Bogotá. He served in that position until 1969, when he became a director of the World Bank until 1974. He then served as ambassador to the United States from 1977 until 1980.

=== Presidency ===
Barco was elected president of Colombia with 58% of the vote in 1986. He supported anti-poverty programs, renewed dialogue with leftist guerillas and fought drug traffickers. Though he was popular within the international community, he became less popular in Colombia because the drug traffickers became more violent after he started to move against them. His restrictive economic policies at first doomed the country. After two years of this, The Economic Openness program was initiated by his administration, which would open Colombian markets to the world and recharge the country's economy. He served one 4-year term.

== Post-Presidency and death ==
When he left the Presidency in 1990, he served as ambassador to Britain again until 1992.

Barco was diagnosed with cancer and he died on May 20, 1997, in Bogotá when he was 75. He is now buried in the Central Cemetery of Bogotá.

== Popular culture ==
- Barco is portrayed by actor Jorge Zúñiga as the character of Ramiro Vargas in TV series Pablo Escobar, The Drug Lord.

Political offices
Preceded by Belisario Betancur Cuartas	President of Colombia; 1986–1990	Succeeded by César Gaviria
