= Hena Rodríguez =

Colombian sculptor (1915–1997)

- Born: Hena Rodríguez Parra; 20 May 1915; Bogotá, Colombia
- Died: 17 April 1997 (aged 81); Bogotá, Colombia
- Occupations: artist, sculptor
- Years active: 1930-1968
- Known for: founding dean of the Faculty of Arts at the University of Los Andes

Hena Rodríguez Parra (20 May 1915 – 17 April 1997) was one of the first Colombian women to become a sculptor. She taught at the National University of Colombia and University of Los Andes, before becoming the founding dean of the Faculty of Arts at the latter institution. Her sculpture Cabeza de Negra is in the collection of the Colombian National Museum and the painting Espalda is part of the Art Collection of the Bank of the Republic.

== Early life and education ==
Hena Rodríguez Parra was born on 20 May 1915 in Bogotá, Colombia. She became interested in art at a very young age, as her family lived across the street from the Spanish sculptor Ramón Barba Guichard, who began teaching her. It was during this time she was introduced to famous artists, including Michelangelo, whom she expressed admiration for.

Between 1930 and 1935, Rodríguez studied at the School of Fine Arts of Bogotá (Spanish: Escuela de Bellas Artes de Bogotá) with Barba Guichard, Francisco Antonio Cano, Coriolano Leudo, Eugenio Peña, and Roberto Pizano. While in school, in 1930, she joined Dario Achury Valenzuela, Rafael Azula Barrera, Tulio González, Darío Samper and Juan P. Varela in founding the Bachué Movement, an avant-garde art of the Americas, with indigenous roots and influences. She was the only woman in the group, that created the first modernist art movement in the country.

In the 1930s, Rodríguez collaborated with other artists on the façade of the Cathedral of Bogotá. In 1935, she enrolled at the Real Academia de Bellas Artes de San Fernando in Madrid. Earning a government scholarship in 1936, she participated in the Exposition Internationale des Arts et Techniques dans la Vie Moderne; in 1937, winning a gold medal for her exhibit in the Uruguayan Pavilion and an honorable mention at the Salon d'Automne that same year. However, Rodríguez explained she fled Spain due to the civil war initiated by Francisco Franco's coup, which interrupted her while mask sculpting in a cemetery. Aided by townspeople, she escaped by hiding in a coffin.

== Career ==
Returning to Colombia in 1938, she began working as an art teacher at the School of Fine Arts of the National University of Colombia. She completed a bust of Julio Flórez, which was installed on Calle 26. The following year, her bust of Antonio José Restrepo was installed at Titiribí. In 1940 she exhibited three pieces in the First Annual Salon of Colombian Artists and in 1942 received an honorable mention in New York City at the Macy's Latin American Fair.

In 1944 Rodríguez joined the faculty as a professor at the School of Fine Arts at the University of Los Andes. That same year, she held a solo exhibition at Bogotá's Hotel Granada. In 1945, she won the bronze medal for her wood carving Cabeza de Negra (Black woman's head) at the 4th Salon of Colombian Artists. The sculpture, owned by the Colombian National Museum, depicts a strong, proud negress, with sensual, fleshy lips. She founded the Museum of Impressions and Reproductions (Spanish: Museo de Impresiones y Reproducciones) in the Teatro de Cristóbal Colón that same year. The museum featured portraits and sculptures of great artists and her own works housed here included Manos de Nicanor Zabaleta (Hands of Nicanor Zabaleta), Manos de (niño) Roberto Benzi (Hands of the child Roberto Benzi, and Manos de Andrés Segovia (Hands of Andrés Segovia), among others.

In 1954, she was one of the founders of the Women's University and became the director of the art section. The director of the University itself was the pianist Elvira Restrepo de Durana. The idea of the Arts Workshops were to give upper-class women instruction in the fine arts to free them from the strict social customs which required that must be chaperoned, were barred from university, and incapable of intellectual conversation. The courses, first held in the laundry of a former women's prison and a women's mental asylum, followed a curricula of three years of fine arts academic work with an additional two years of independent study and practical application. Rodríguez was the first dean of the Faculty of Arts when the program was incorporated into the University of Los Andes, serving from 1954 to 1958. In 1968, Rodríguez was forced to retire and was awarded the university's highest honor, the Chivo de Oro.

Rodríguez primarily worked as a sculptor, in wood, marble and stone; She also painted: Espalda (Back, 1945) that forms part of the Art Collection of the Bank of the Republic. The painting features the back of a female nude figure, which utilizes a dramatic lighting effect to highlight the contours of her shape and pull it into the foreground. The pale pinks, reds and greens used in the oil painting, red drape and short hair, emphasize the appreciation of the female. Her female sculptures, moved away from the Art Nouveau portrayals of femininity and motherhood and tried to capture the essence of women's power.

After her forced retirement, Rodríguez and her work were long forgotten. Acquisitions by the Bank of the Republic begin until the 1980s. The National Museum lagged far behind other museums.

In 1982, she was among the group which accompanied Gabriel García Márquez to Stockholm to accept the Nobel Prize for literature.

== Personal life ==
Rodríguez lived openly as a lesbian. She was a friend of many artists and ceramicists, such as Elvira Martínez, Elisa Mujica and Carolina Cárdenas. In the United States, she was friends with the Madisonian Long family, who nicknamed her "Enita", "for years" by January 1983. Additionally, she was a member of the Colombian Association for the Care of Animals, primarily helping the Bogotan poor take care of their pets.

== Death and legacy ==
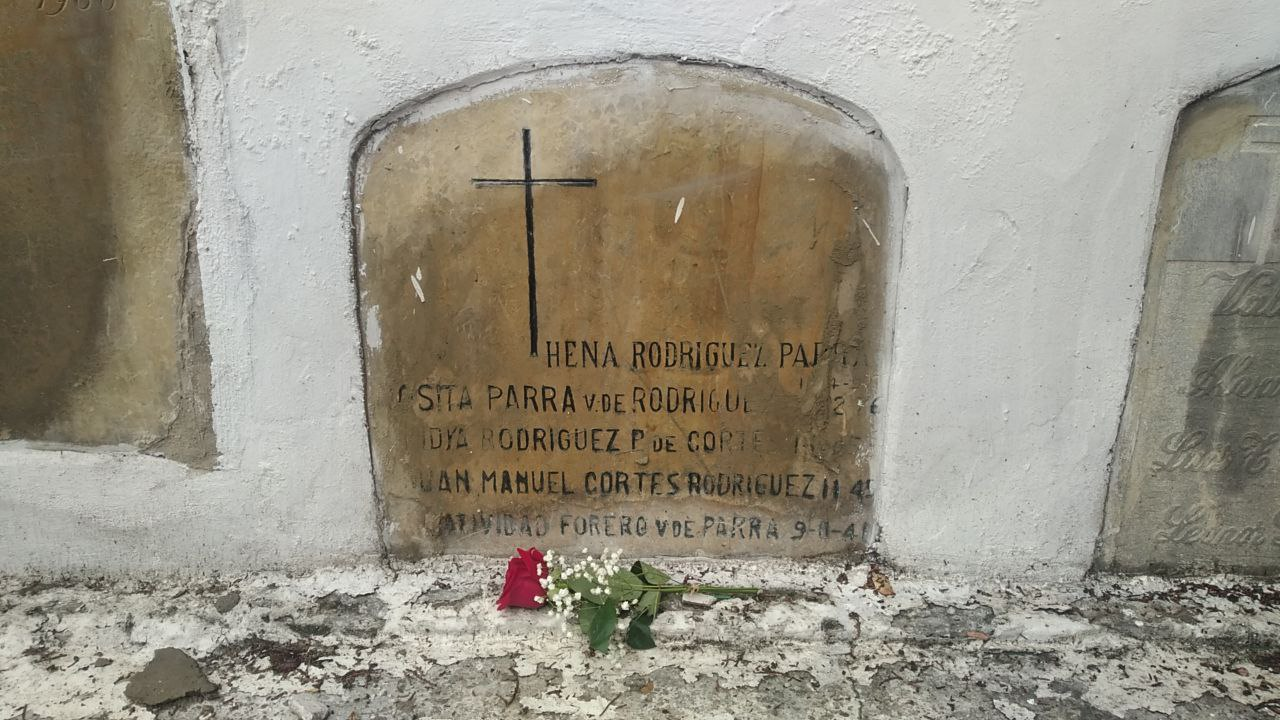
Hena Rodríguez's grave at the Central Cemetery in Bogotá

Rodríguez died 17 April 1997 in Bogotá and was interred in the Central Cemetery of Bogotá. Rodríguez's significance and that of the Bachué Movement has been re-evaluated and is recognized as a significant contribution to the development of modern art in Colombia.
