= Patricia Eugenia Cárdenas Santa María =

Colombian diplomat, businesswoman and engineer

Patricia Cárdenas

Colombia Ambassador to Mexico
- Incumbent
- Assumed office March 2016
- President: Juan Manuel Santos Calderón

Colombia Ambassador to Brazil
- In office March 2014 – March 2016
- President: Álvaro Uribe Vélez
- Preceded by: Francisco José Sierra Arango

Colombia Ambassador to Japan
- In office 15 March 2007 – March 2014
- President: Álvaro Uribe Vélez
- Preceded by: Francisco José Sierra Arango

Colombia Ambassador to Singapore
- Incumbent
- Assumed office 26 July 2007
- President: Álvaro Uribe Vélez
- Preceded by: Francisco José Sierra Arango

Colombia Ambassador to Australia
- In office 31 May 2007 – 30 April 2008
- President: Álvaro Uribe Vélez
- Preceded by: Francisco José Sierra Arango
- Succeeded by: Diego Betancur Álvarez

Colombia Ambassador to New Zealand
- In office 17 July 2007 – 17 February 2009
- President: Álvaro Uribe Vélez
- Preceded by: Francisco José Sierra Arango
- Succeeded by: Diego Betancur Álvarez

Personal details
- Born: Medellín, Antioquia, Colombia
- Spouse: Ricardo Sala Gaitán (divorced)
- Relations: Mauricio Cárdenas Santa María (brother)
- Children: María Paula Sala Cárdenas; Ana Daniela Sala Cárdenas; Juan Felipe Sala Cárdenas
- Education: University of the Andes (BSc, 1983)
- Profession: Industrial Engineer

Patricia Eugenia Cárdenas Santa María (born 1958) is a Colombian diplomat, businesswoman and engineer. She is the current Ambassador of Colombia in México. She served as Ambassador of Colombia to Brazil, as Ambassador of Colombia to Japan and Non-Resident Ambassador to Singapore Australia and New Zealand. An industrial engineer, she was President of the Banking and Financial Institutions Association of Colombia from 2000 to 2006.

== Background ==
She is daughter of Jorge Cárdenas Gutierrez, former President of the National Federation of Coffee Growers of Colombia, and Cecilia Santa María Botero. She married, and later divorced, Ricardo Sala Gaitán with whom she had three children: María Paula, Ana Daniela, and Juan Felipe.

Patricia Cárdenas is a qualified Industrial Engineer from University of Los Andes, Bogotá. She obtained a Diploma in Economic Development from the University of Oxford in June 1985.

== Career ==
From 1982 to 1984, Cárdenas was the Administrative Director of the Research Institute SER. She became Head of the Planning for the Ministry of Finance and Public Credit's Economic and Fiscal Analysis Office in 1985 and from 1989 Advisor to Minister, Ministry of Finance and Public Credit.

In 1996, Cárdenas became Commercial Director at Naturandina Ltda, International Trading Co. She then entered politics from 1998 to 2000 as a City Council Member of Bogotá, D.C. In 2001 she became President of the Banking and Financial Institutions Association of Colombia, ASOBANCARIA.

Cárdenas has served on numerous boards as representative of the Minister of Finance including being the Joint Administrator of the Institute of Social Insurances, the Committee of Credit of the National Energy Finance, and the Plan of Integrated Rural Development.

From 1996 to 1997, she was on the Board of Fiduciary Bogotá, from 2000 to 2006 Crafts of Colombia as the representative of the President of the Republic, from 2001 to 2006 the Board of the National Fund of Guarantees Co Ltd. She was also on the Board of Latin American Federation of Banks - FELABAN from 2002 to 2006, and the Modern Art Museum of Bogotá from 2004 to 2006. Cárdenas was a member of the Boards of Directors of the University of Los Andes.

== Ambassadorship ==
On 19 December 2006, President Álvaro Uribe Vélez appointed Cárdenas Ambassador of the Republic of Colombia to the State of Japan accredited as Non-Resident Ambassador to the Commonwealth of Australia, the Republic of Singapore, and New Zealand. Cárdenas presented her Letters of Credence to Emperor Akihito of Japan on 17 March 2007 at a ceremony at the Tokyo Imperial Palace, to Major General Michael Jeffery, Governor-General of Australia, on 31 May 2007 at Government House, Canberra, to Sellapan Ramanathan, President of Singapore, on 26 July 2007 at the Istana, and to Sir Anand Satyanand, Governor-General of New Zealand on 17 July 2007 at Government House, Wellington.

In 2008, Colombia reopened its embassy in Australia and named Diego Betancur Álvarez Ambassador of Colombia to Australia, formally taking the representation of Colombia to Australia and New Zealand from Ambassador Cárdenas who remained Ambassador to Japan and Singapore.

On 2014, after 7 years accredited as Colombian Ambassador of Colombia to Japan, President Juan Manuel Santos Calderón appointed Cárdenas Ambassador of the Republic of Colombia to the Federative Republic of Brazil. Cárdenas remained in this position from March 2014 to March 2016.

Cárdenas was appointed Ambassador of Colombia to Mexico in March 2016. Ambassador Cárdenas presented her Letters of Credence to President of Mexico Enrique Peña Nieto, on 12 May 2016.

Ambassador Cárdenas promoted the celebration of the Colombia-Mexico / Mexico-Colombia year, 2017-2018, with more than 200 activities in both countries.
