= Central Cemetery of Bogotá =

Cemetery in Bogotá, Colombia

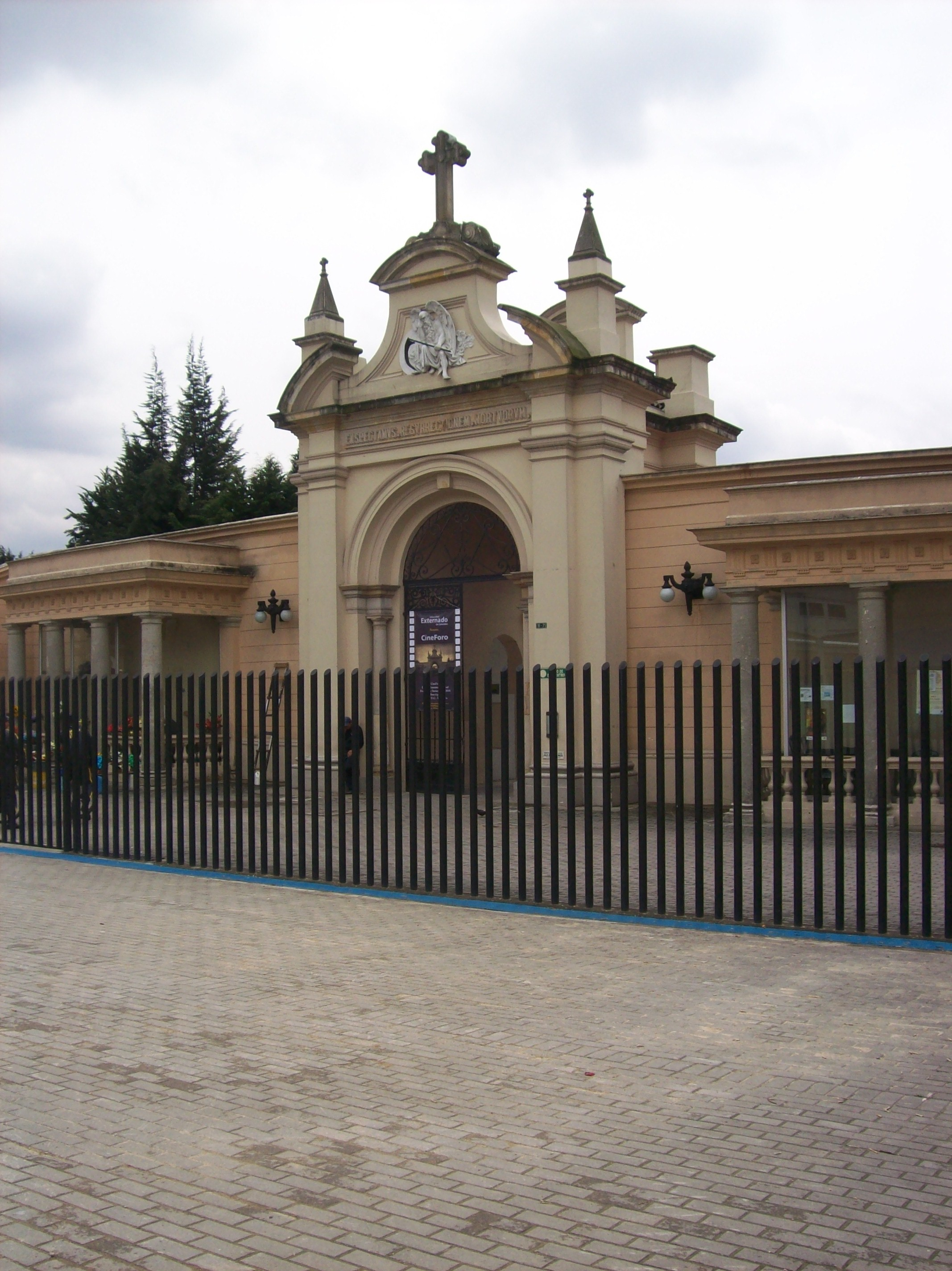
- Interactive map of Central Cemetery of Bogotá

Details
- Established: 1836
- Location: Bogotá
- Country: Colombia
- Coordinates: 4°36′59″N 74°4′31″W
- Type: Public
- Find a Grave: Central Cemetery of Bogotá

Central Cemetery of Bogotá (Spanish: Cementerio Central de Bogotá) is one of the main and most famous cemeteries in Colombia located in Bogotá. Houses several national heroes, poets and former Colombian presidents. It was opened in 1836 and was declared National Monument in 1984. Some of the sculptors of the mausoleums are Tenerani and Sighinolfi.

== Pavilion of the Presidents and First Ladies ==
The cemetery has been the site of many funerals and burials. The presidents buried in the pavilion of the presidents:

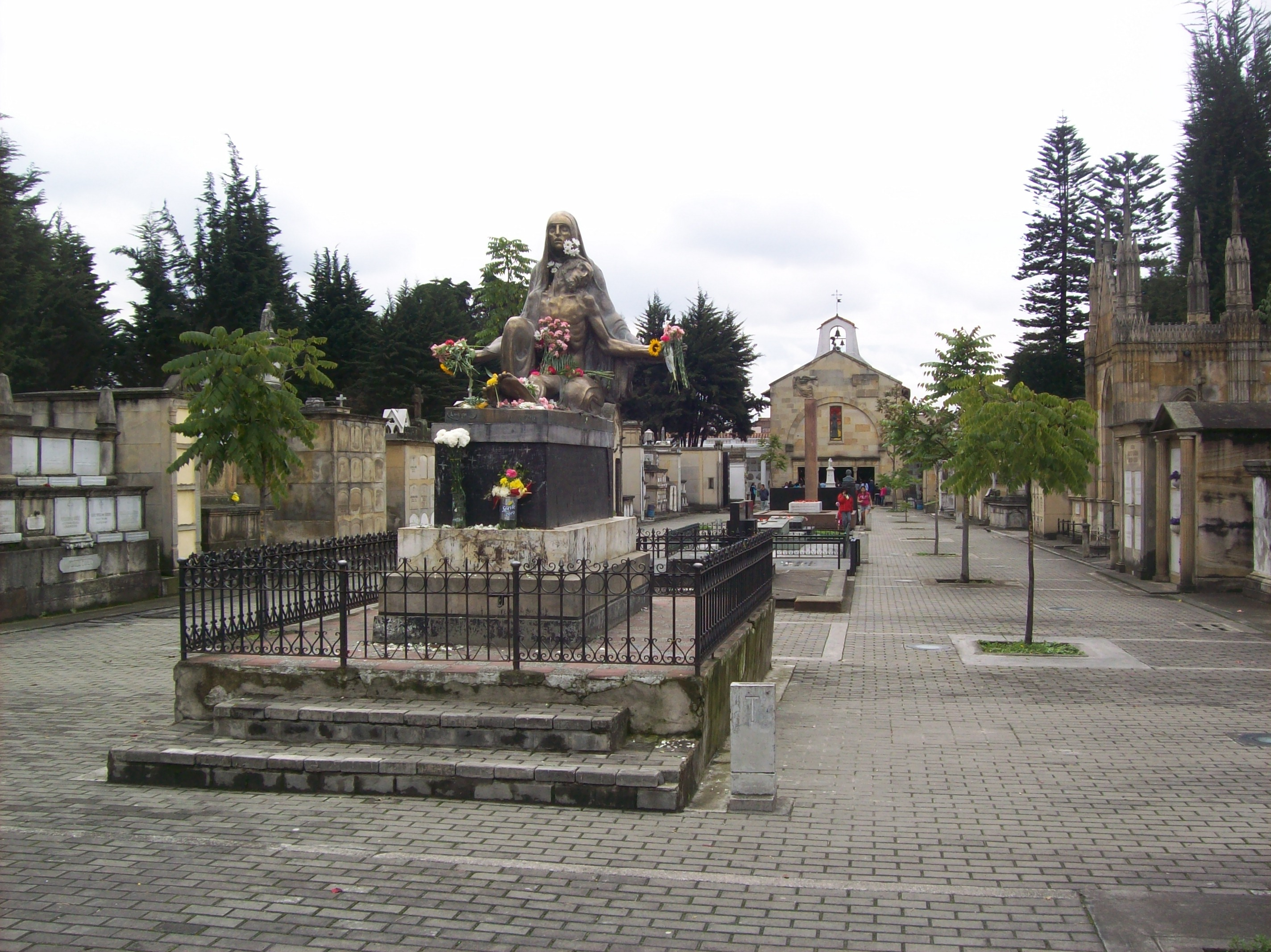
Pavilion of the Presidents

=== Central wing ===
- Francisco de Paula Santander – First constitutional Colombian president
- Miguel Abadía Méndez – Former president
- Santos Acosta – Former president
- Miguel Antonio Caro – Former president
- Laureano Gómez – Former president
- José Ignacio de Márquez – Former president
- Rafael Reyes – Former president
- Eustorgio Salgar Moreno – Former president
- Eduardo Santos – Former president

=== Right wing ===
- Santiago Pérez – Former president
- José Vicente Concha – Former president
- Alfonso López Pumarejo – Former president
- María Michelsen Lombana – First Lady
- Alfonso López Michelsen – Former president
- Cecilia Caballero Blanco – First lady
- Marco Fidel Suárez – Former president
- Carlos Lleras Restrepo – Former president
- Cecilia de la Fuente de Lleras – First lady
- Gustavo Rojas – Former president
- Virgilio Barco Vargas – Former president
- Carolina Isakson – First lady

=== Left wing ===
- Manuel Murillo Toro – Former president
- Enrique Olaya – Former president
- Misael Pastrana Borrero – Former president
- María Cristina Arango – First lady

== Notable interments ==
- Soledad Acosta – Writer and journalist
- Rafael Almansa – Venerated Catholic priest
- Gilberto Alzate Avendaño – Former ambassador to Spain
- José Asunción Silva – poet and writer
- José Fernández Madrid – Scientist, writer and statesman
- Luis Carlos Galán – Former candidate for presidency
- Julio Garavito – astronomer
- Álvaro Gómez Hurtado – Former candidate for presidency
- León de Greiff – poet and Writer
- Gonzalo Jiménez de Quesada – Founder of Bogota
- Leo Siegfried Kopp – Founder of the Bavaria Beer Company
- Nepomuceno Matallana – serial killer
- Jean Marie Marcelin Gilibert – Founder of the National Police of Colombia
- Jaime Pardo Leal – Former candidate for presidency
- Carlos Pizarro – Former candidate for presidency
- Rafael Pombo – poet and writer
- Hena Rodríguez – sculptor
- Oreste Sindici – Composer of the National Anthem of Colombia
- Miguel Uribe Turbay – senator
- Rafael Uribe Uribe – Politician and statesman
- José Eustasio Rivera – Lawyer and novelist

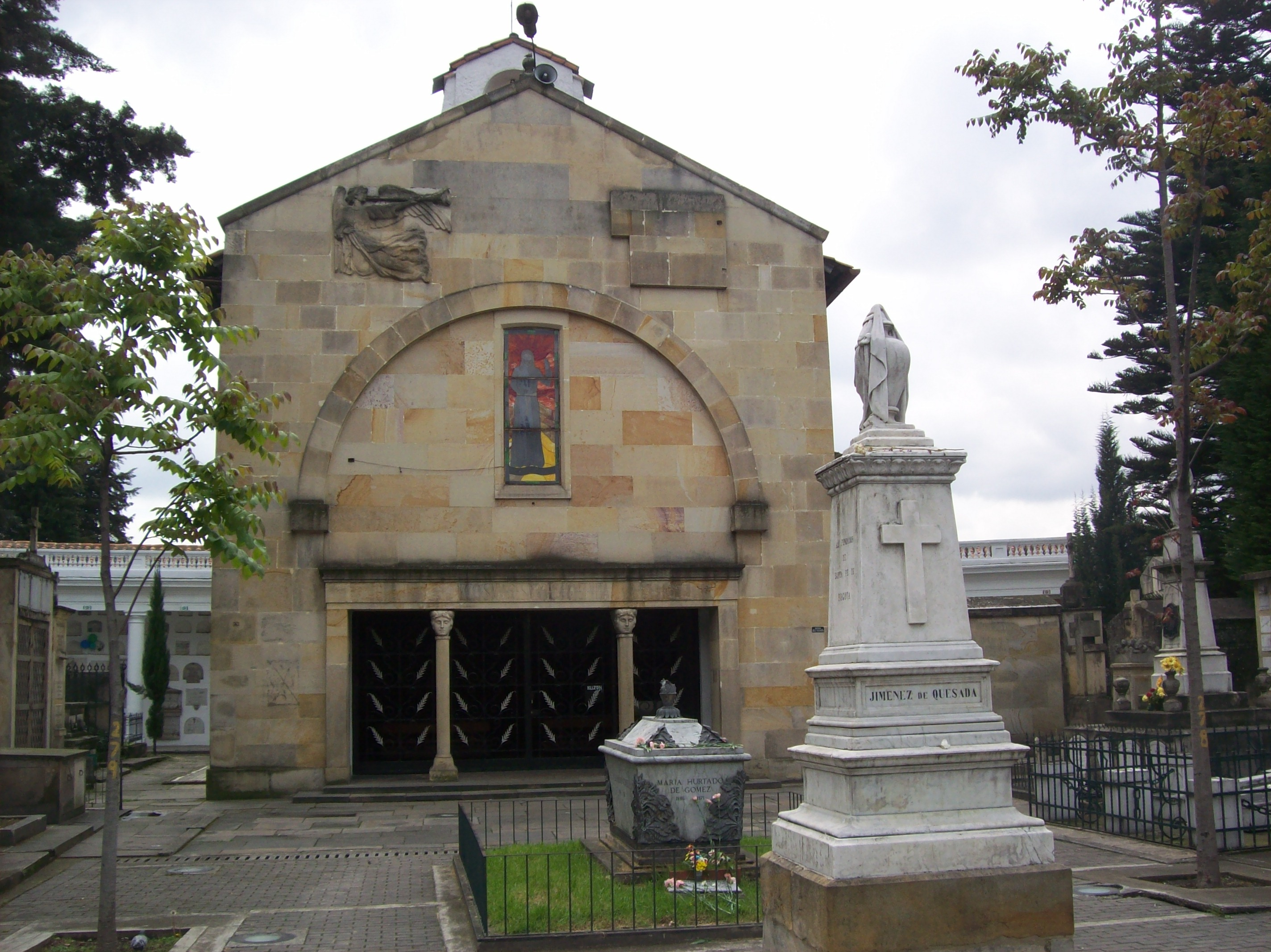
Cenotaph of Gonzalo Jiménez de Quesada at Central Cemetery.
