= Ricardo Sala Gaitán =

Colombia Ambassador to Germany
- In office 27 April 1992 – 27 January 1996
- President: César Gaviria Trujillo
- Preceded by: Luis Guillermo Giraldo Hurtado
- Succeeded by: Jorge Bendeck Olivella

Personal details
- Party: Liberal
- Spouse: Patricia Eugenia Cárdenas Santa María (divorced)
- Children: María Paula Sala Cárdenas; Ana Daniela Sala Cárdenas; Juan Felipe Sala Cárdenas
- Education: University of the Andes (BSc, )
- Profession: Industrial Engineer

Ricardo Sala Gaitán is a Colombian industrial engineer and politician.

== Ambassadorship ==
On 17 March 1992, President César Gaviria Trujillo designated Sala as Ambassador of Colombia to Germany. Sala presented his Letters of Credence to Richard von Weizsäcker, President of Germany, on 27 April 1992 at the Hammerschmidt Villa. On 27 January 1996, as a result of the public events that surrounded the 8000 Process scandal, Sala resigned his Ambassadorship in protest against the then President of Colombia Ernesto Samper Pizano.

== Personal life ==
He married. and later divorced, Patricia Eugenia Cárdenas Santa María with whom he had three children: María Paula, Ana Daniela, and Juan Felipe.
