= Virgilio Barco Isakson =

Colombian economist (born 1965)

- Born: 1965 (age 60–61); Bogota, D.C., Colombia
- Education: Harvard University; Massachusetts Institute of Technology; New York University
- Known for: Impact investing, LGBTQI+ activism
- Partner: Andrew Dier
- Parent(s): Virgilio Barco Vargas; Carolina Isakson de Barco
- Family: Carolina Barco (sister); Julia Barco (sister); Diana Barco (sister)

Virgilio Barco Isakson (born 1965) is a Colombian impact investor and LBGTQI+ activist. He is the son of former Colombian President Virgilio Barco Vargas.

== Career ==
Since 2013, Barco Isakson has been the first Latin America Director at Acumen, a leading impact investing fund that focuses on tackling global poverty.

In 2018, Barco Isakson co-founded ALIVE, an Impact Fund Manager based in Bogota, Colombia and became its Managing Partner. In 2024, ALIVE was included in the Impact Assets 50 database of the 50 leading impact investment managers in the world.

From 2011 to 2013, Barco Isakson served as executive director of the Banca de Inversión Social, a nonprofit organization that is at the forefront of impact investing in Colombia.

From 2006 to 2010, Barco Isakson led Invest in Bogota, a public-private partnership that promotes foreign direct investment to the Greater Bogota region.

Previously, Barco Isakson headed the privatization unit at the Colombian Ministry of Finance and Public Credit and was an advisor on local economic development for the country's planning department. He has also worked as a management consultant at Booz Allen Hamilton in Brazil and as a financial analyst at Citibank in Spain.

== LGBTQI+ activism ==
Barco Isakson is the co-founder and Chairperson of the Board of Directors of Colombia Diversa, a Bogota-based nonprofit organization founded in 2004 that advocates for LGBTQI+ rights in Colombia. Colombia Diversa was instrumental in litigation that led the Colombian Constitutional Court to extend property, inheritance, and other benefits to same-sex couples in 2007, recognize de facto civil unions in 2009, and recognize same-sex marriage in 2011.

== Education ==
Barco Isakson holds a Bachelor of Arts in government from Harvard University (1987), a Master of Science in management from the Massachusetts Institute of Technology, and a Master of Arts in economics from New York University (1999).

== Personal life ==
Barco Isakson was born to former Colombian president Virgilio Barco Vargas and Carolina Isakson Proctor. Barco Isakson is the youngest of four: Carolina, Julia, and Diana. He lives in Bogota with his partner, Andrew Dier, with whom he has been together since 1998.
