= Carolina Isakson de Barco =

First Lady of Colombia from 1986 to 1990

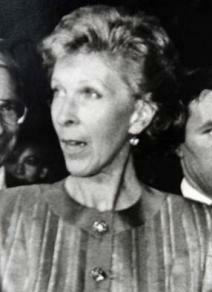
- Isakson in 1987

First Lady of Colombia
- In role August 7, 1986 – August 7, 1990
- President: Virgilio Barco Vargas
- Preceded by: Rosa Álvarez de Betancur
- Succeeded by: Ana Milena Muñoz de Gaviria

First Lady of Bogotá
- In role January 1, 1966 – December 31, 1969
- Mayor: Virgilio Barco Vargas
- Preceded by: Emma Villegas Puyana
- Succeeded by: Margarita Vanegas

Personal details
- Born: Mary Caroline Isakson; January 6, 1930 York, Pennsylvania, U.S.
- Died: January 24, 2012 (aged 82) Bogotá, D.C., Colombia
- Resting place: Central Cemetery of Bogotá
- Party: Liberal
- Spouse: Virgilio Barco Vargas (m. 1950; died 1997)
- Children: Carolina; Julia; Diana; Virgilio
- Education: Stanford University (BA, 1949)

Carolina Isakson de Barco (born Mary Caroline Isakson, (Note: Name prior to her marriage: Carolina Isakson Proctor, a Hispanicization of her American birth name Mary Caroline Isakson.) January 6, 1930 – January 14, 2012) was an American and Colombian artist and philanthropist who served as first lady of Colombia from 1986 to 1990 and previously as first lady of Bogotá from 1966 to 1969 as wife of Virgilio Barco Vargas. She is the second naturalized citizen to become first lady, the third first lady born abroad after Cecilia de la Fuente de Lleras (wife of Carlos Lleras Restrepo), the first and only Lutheran first lady and the second to have a profession after María Michelsen de López (wife of Alfonso López Pumarejo).

Mary Caroline Isakson was born in York, Pennsylvania, her family moved to Cúcuta, Norte de Santander when she was 7 years old. She changed the typing of her name to Carolina and adopted her mother's maiden name Proctor to adapt her name to the Spanish naming customs resulting in Carolina Isakson Proctor. At the age of 14 she moved to Palo Alto, California to attend the Castilleja School where she would finish high school. She would later finish her Latin American Studies at Stanford University and obtain a master's degree in Spanish at Boston University.

Carolina and Virgilio met through Virgilio's sister Edelmira who was Carolina's schoolmate. She supported and accompanied her husband during the 1986 presidential campaign.

== Early life, education and family ==
Mary Caroline Isakson was born in York, Pennsylvania on January 6, 1930. Her father Carl Oscar Isakson worked as a petroleum engineer in Tampico, Mexico. His family settled in Cúcuta, Norte de Santander thanks to the work of his father who worked as an engineer for Ecopetrol.

Carolina and Virgilio met in Cúcuta when she was a classmate of Virgilio's younger sister Edelmira. They married on July 1, 1950 in the Cathedral of Cúcuta. A year later in 1951 his eldest daughter Carolina would be born and two years later his daughter Julia, a year later Diana and three years later his only son Virgilio.

At 14 he moved to California to finish his studies, complete his high school studies and begin his university studies. Carolina studied Latin American Studies at Stanford University and would later obtain a master's degree in Spanish Language at Boston University.

== First Lady of Colombia (1986-1990) ==
After the election of Virgilio Barco Vargas as president of Colombia. Carolina served as first lady, being the first whose native language is not Spanish and the third born abroad after Cecilia de la Fuente de Lleras born in Spain.

While serving as First Lady of Colombia, she helped to create "Bienestar," an anti-poverty program focused on improving the quality of life for Colombian children. Following the program's launch in February 1987, she was appointed as its director. Program personnel identified individual women in communities across Colombia who were each capable of caring for up to fifteen children, aged six months to seven years, in the women's respective homes. After working with each of those women to ensure that they had appropriate kitchen and bathroom facilities in their homes, and providing them with day care training, the program then paid the women salaries to care for the groups of children they were assigned, freeing up the mothers of those children to obtain employment, which, in turn, increased the standards of living of the families whose children were enrolled in the program. By March 1988, 120,000 children were receiving food via the program with planners hoping to increase that number to one million by 1990.

During her husband's administration, she helped to create, and then directed, a national anti-poverty program, "Bienestar," which was established in February 1987 to provide food and day care for Colombian's poorest children. She also served as presidente of the board of directors of the Colombian Institute of Family Welfare.

== Death ==
Preceded in death by her parents and husband, she died on January 24, 2012, in Bogotá, D.C., Colombia.

== Notes ==
Honorary titles
Preceded by Emma Villegas Puyana	First Lady of Bogotá; 1966–1969	Succeeded by Margarita Vanegas
Preceded by Rosa Álvarez de Betancur	First Lady of Colombia; 1986–1990	Succeeded by Ana Milena Muñoz de Gaviria
