= Nepomuceno Matallana =

Colombian criminal

Nepumeceno Matallana
- Born: Buenaventura Nepomuceno Matallana; September 1891; Boyacá Department, Colombia
- Died: 24 January 1960 (aged 68); Bogotá, Colombia
- Other names: "Doctor Mata"; "The Murderous Tinterillo"
- Conviction: Murder
- Penalty: 24 years imprisonment

Details
- Victims: 1–7+
- Span of crimes: 1936–1947
- Country: Colombia

Buenaventura Nepomuceno Matallana (September 1891 – 24 January 1960) was a Colombian criminal, murderer, and suspected serial killer. He was tried and sentenced to 24 years imprisonment for the 1949 murder of merchant Alfredo Forero Vanegas, and he was also suspected to be responsible for the disappearances of at least six or seven others to whom he pretended to be a lawyer, receiving broad powers over their properties with the promise of making them big business, after which the clients either disappeared or were found dead.

== Trial and conviction ==
His trial, prolonged and complicated by deceit of the defendant's legal expert and by the weakness of the investigative organizations, caused great sensation and expectation in the Colombian society. The judge had to borrow a theater to hold the hearings, due to the large number of people present. Gabrial García Márquez stated in one of his chronicles, "Las audiencias públicas que se adelantan en Bogotá para juzgar a Nepomuceno Matallana, el célebre doctor Mata, están haciendo la competencia" [transl.: The public hearings that are held in Bogotá to judge Nepomuceno Matallana, the famous Doctor Mata, are giving competition to] El derecho de nacer, a radionovela by Félix B. Caignet that made the nation cry each of the 300 days it was broadcast.

During his trial he escaped twice, once during the riots of 9 April 1948. Matallana never admitted responsibility for the crimes he was accused. The jury's verdict was to condemn him to 24 years in prison. This was the maximum sentence in Colombia at that time. In the same conditions, Hipólito Herrera, the accomplice active in Forero's murder, was convicted and confessed to the police the exact location of the body in exchange for chicken broth. However, while serving the sentence in the Panóptico prison in Tunja, Matallana declared that the trial had flaws in the procedures, and at the end of the 1950s, the second public hearing was started against him for the "crimen de Calderitas" [transl. crime of Calderitas] (the nickname the press gave to Forero's murder case, as the body was found in the Calderitas wasteland).

== Death ==
On 24 January 1960, Matallana died in the infirmary of the La Modelo prison of Bogotá while waiting for the result of the new verdict. His death was caused by bronchitis with heart failure. Two days later, he received a religious ceremony in the Basilica of the Voto Nacional, after which he was buried in the Central Cemetery of Bogotá.

== See also ==
- List of serial killers by country

== Bibliography ==
- Cruz Niño, E. (2013). The Monsters that Exist in Colombia. Icono. ISBN 9789588461342.
