= Carolina Barco =

Colombian-American diplomat (born 1951)

Carolina Barco Isakson
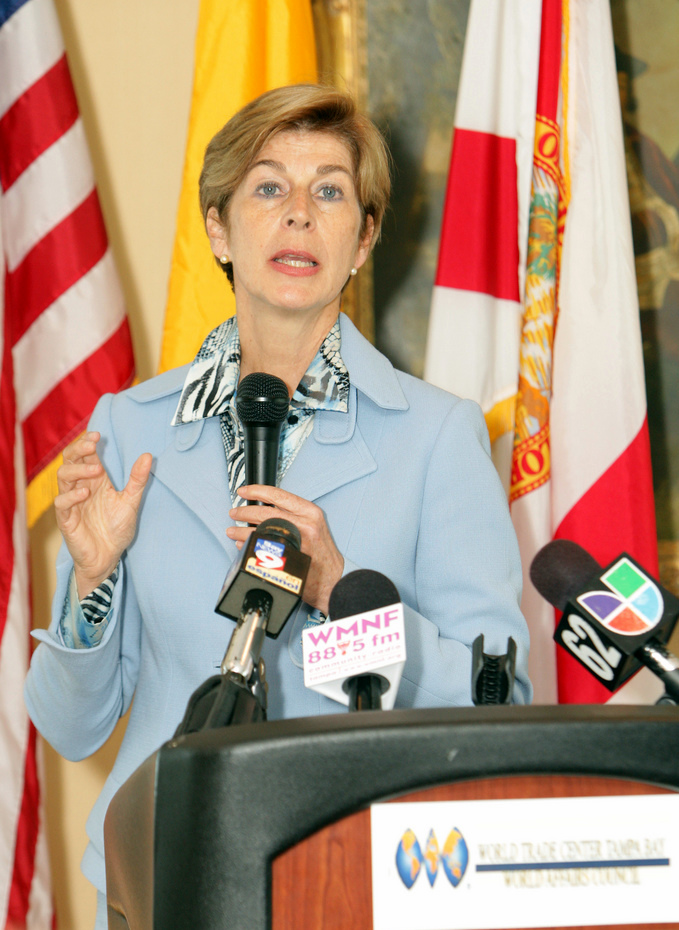
- Ambassador Barco speaking before a TradeRoots forum on the US-Colombia Free Trade Agreement.

Colombia Ambassador to the United States
- In office 26 August 2006 – 1 October 2010
- President: Álvaro Uribe Vélez
- Preceded by: Andrés Pastrana Arango
- Succeeded by: Gabriel Silva Luján

Minister of Foreign Affairs
- In office 7 August 2002 – 7 August 2006
- President: Álvaro Uribe Vélez
- Preceded by: Guillermo Fernández de Soto
- Succeeded by: María Consuelo Araújo

Personal details
- Born: María Carolina Barco Isakson; 1951 (age 74–75) Boston, Massachusetts, U.S.
- Education: Wellesley College; Harvard University; IE Business School
- Profession: Diplomat

María Carolina Barco Isakson (born 1951) is a Colombian-American diplomat, who served as Minister of Foreign Affairs of Colombia from 2002 to 2007, and then as Ambassador of Colombia to the United States from 2006 to 2010.

She served as the Colombian ambassador to Spain in 2019 and 2020.

== Personal life ==
Carolina Barco Isakson is a daughter of Virgilio Barco Vargas, a former mayor, senator, ambassador, President of Colombia and director to the World Bank Board. Her mother, Carolina Isakson de Barco, an American-born former First Lady of Colombia, helped to create, and then direct, Colombia's national anti-poverty program, "Bienestar," which was established in February 1987 to provide food and day care for Colombian's poorest children.

Carolina Barco was born in Boston, Massachusetts while her father, Virgilio Barco Vargas, was there studying at the Massachusetts Institute of Technology. In 1973, Barco received her bachelor of arts degree in Sociology and Economics from Wellesley College in Massachusetts. During her time at Wellesley, she spent a year studying abroad at the Université Libre de Bruxelles in Belgium. In 1975, she received a master's degree in city planning from the Harvard University Graduate School of Design. In 1984, she received a master of business administration at IE Business School in Madrid, Spain. From 1990 to 1991, she was a visiting scholar at her father's alma mater, MIT.

Carolina Barco was married to Mauricio Botero Caicedo, with whom she had three daughters. Her brother, Virgilio Barco Isakson, founded one of Colombia's largest gay civil rights NGOs, Colombia Diversa.

== Career ==
Barco conducted research from 1988 to 1999 at the University of the Andes. Assessing the growth of Bogotá and its neighboring towns and cities, she generated information which helped to formulate future urban and territorial growth policies to improve sustainability.

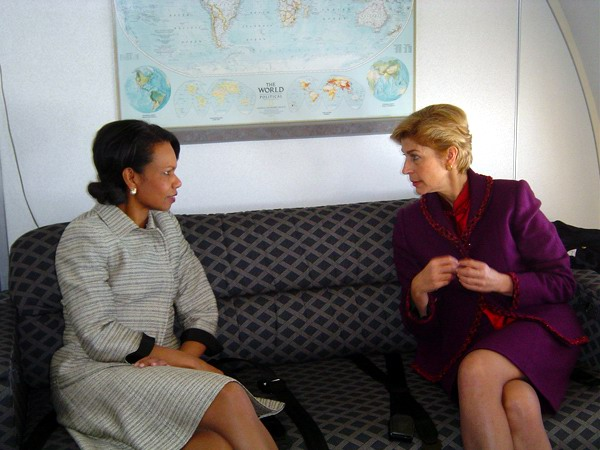
Carolina Barco (right) with Condoleezza Rice

Barco was appointed Foreign Minister of Colombia by President Álvaro Uribe in August 2002 and remained in that post until July 2006, when she was appointed Ambassador to the United States, replacing former Colombian president Andrés Pastrana Arango in Washington, D.C.

In September 2003, she was announced by The Miami Herald as one of the invited speakers at its annual "America's Conference." The theme for the October program was "Rebuilding Hemispheric Relations: New Economic Perspectives and Changing Foreign Policy Realities."

In 2007, she was one of several high-ranking political figures, celebrities and prominent athletes who attended a black-tie gala for the Formula Smiles Foundation, which was hosted by NASCAR driver Juan Pablo Montoya in the art district of Miami, Florida. Montoya's BeLive Gala raised funds for six Colombian charities.

One of twenty-five women stationed in Washington, D.C. as ambassadors from their respective nations in 2010, Barco was the only female ambassador representing Latin America that year.

In 2019 and 2020, she served as the Colombian ambassador to Spain.
