= Megan Isaacson =

American singer

- Born: Megan Isaacson
- Origin: Texas
- Genres: Christian, Gospel, Pop
- Occupation: Singer
- Instruments: Vocals, Guitar
- Years active: 2000 - Present

Megan Isaacson is an American Gospel Music Association award-winning Christian and gospel singer.

== Career ==
Megan Isaacson was born in Austin, Texas. She started her career in 2000, when she flew to Australia to sing with the Continental Singers. Upon returning, she started touring with youth ministry, Dare 2 Share. Finally, in the early summer of 2005 she released her debut album Close. She also recorded her song 'Worship' which won her an award at the Gospel Music Association.

Isaacson once said, "I love, making music, but more important to me than making music is helping people catch a glimpse of how valuable they are to God, which I show them through my music."

== Discography ==
=== Albums ===
Year	Album Cover	Albums Released	Genre
2005		Close	Christian/Gospel

== Awards and nominations ==
1. Gospel Music Association- Song of The Year, winner
