= Caroline Isaacson =

Australian journalist (1900–1962)

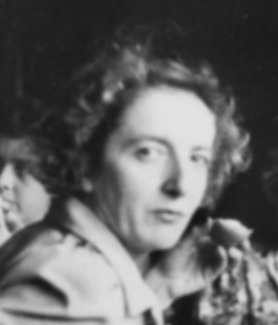
- Isaacson in the Australian Women's Army Service, 1943
- Born: Caroline Jacobson; 14 September 1900; Vienna, Austria
- Died: 23 January 1962 (aged 61); Genoa, Italy
- Other names: Lynka Isaacson, Viola
- Family: Peter Isaacson (son)
- Awards: Australian Media Hall of Fame

Caroline "Lynka" Isaacson née Jacobsen (14 September 1900 – 23 January 1962) was a Jewish journalist and editor in Melbourne, Australia.

== Early life and education ==
Caroline Jacobson was born in Vienna, Austria on 14 September 1900, daughter of Bettina (née Lipmann) and shipping manager Emile Jacobson. She was taught at home by a governess who coined the name "Lynka", and later completed her education at Highbury in London.

She commenced medical training at King's College London, but left after her marriage to Lieutenant Arnold Isaacson (born 29 March 1881) on 30 March 1919. He was an Australian soldier in the AIF who had survived the Gallipoli landing.

== Career ==
Isaacson began contributing articles as a freelance journalist in London. Following her marriage and the birth of two children, Peter and Joan, she and her husband returned to Australia in 1926, where he found work as an agent for a printing press manufacturer. Two years later, following the failure of that business, Isaacson sought work as a reporter for The Age. Commencing as a women's social writer, she was promoted to women's editor of that paper, soon transferring to its weekly, The Leader, as women's editor. She also contributed articles and, as Viola, started The Spare Corner Club which published readers' contributions. She produced several editions of The Leader Spare Corner Book, a compilation of hints and recipes from those columns.

On the outbreak of World War II, Isaacson was made foreign news editor at The Age, but in July 1942 she joined in the Australian Women's Army Service. Later she was moved to the Directorate of Public Relations where she was promoted to rank of captain. Her work included accompanying women journalists and photographers on tours of military installations and acting as public relations officer to two generals, Thomas Blamey and Stanley Savige. She was discharged in September 1943.

Next, Isaacson worked for Vogue on its fashion pages and wrote feature articles for The Argus. In 1945 she was appointed editor of the women's pages of The Argus, but in 1948 she bought, edited and wrote for The Dandenong Ranges News, which ceased publication in October 1949.

Throughout her life Isaacson was also active in Jewish affairs and, from 1948, was the editor of the Australian Jewish Outlook and worked in public relations for the Victorian Jewish Board of Deputies.

In 1953 she became a director of her son's company, Peter Isaacson Publications.

Following her husband's death in 1960, Isaacson retired and travelled to Europe. She died on 23 January 1962 in Genoa, Italy.

She was posthumously inducted into the Australian Media Hall of Fame.
