= Emma Isakson =

Swedish newspaper publisher and suffragist

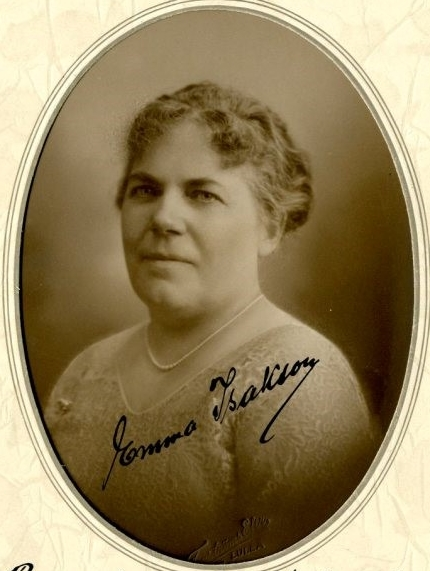
Emma Isakson, signed portrait (1930)

Emma Josefina Isakson (1880–1952) was a Swedish newspaper publisher and suffragist who is remembered for her activity in Luleå at a time when few women gained positions of influence. From the age of 17, she worked for the daily newspaper Norbottens-Kuriren which she headed from 1945. She was also active in women's rights, acting as treasurer for the Luleå branch of the National Association for Women's Suffrage (LKPR) from its inception at the turn of the century.

== Biography ==
Born in Luleå on 14 April 1880, Emma Josefina Isakson was the daughter of the newspaper owner Nils Petter Isakson (1839–1907) and his wife Fredrika Vilhelmina née Eriksson (1843–1902). She was the eighth in a family of nine children. After attending Luleå's elementary school for girls, when she was 17 she began to work for her father's newspaper Norrbottens-Kururen together with two of her older brothers. Throughout her life she lived in the large building in Luleå which housed the newspaper's offices and printing presses but was also the family home. In 1908, she became the paper's accountant and in 1924 was elected to the board. In 1945, she became the paper's owner and editor-in-chief.

Isakson actively supported women's suffrage from the turn of the century when she became treasurer for the newly established Luleå branch of the National Association for Women's Suffrage. Thanks to her involvement, the local association was able to announce its activities free of charge in Norbottens-Kuriren. She later chaired the Luleå organization and organized suffrage activities in the whole of Norrland. In an anniversary article in the Norrbotten-Kuriren in 1920, the editor Ivar Frick commented: "She stood on her own two feet and saw things with her own two eyes." She was "strict but fair".

Emma Isakson died in Luleå on 15 February 1952.
