= Peter Isaacson =

Australian pilot and publisher

Peter Stuart Isaacson
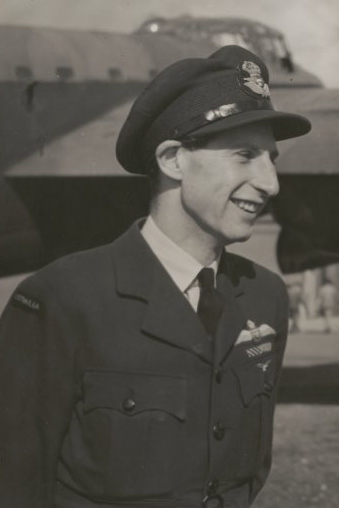
- Flight Lieutenant Isaacson with Lancaster Q-for-Queenie, 1943
- Born: 31 July 1920; London
- Died: 7 April 2017 (aged 96); Melbourne
- Military career
- Allegiance: Australia
- Branch: Royal Australian Air Force
- Service years: 1940–46 (RAAF); 1946–69 (RAAF Reserve)
- Rank: Wing Commander
- Unit: RAF Bomber Command
- Conflicts: World War II
- Awards: Member of the Order of Australia; Distinguished Flying Cross; Air Force Cross; Distinguished Flying Medal
- Other work: Publisher

Peter Stuart Isaacson, AM, DFC, AFC, DFM (31 July 1920 – 7 April 2017) was an Australian publisher and decorated military pilot. He was the owner of Peter Isaacson Publications, publisher of various trade journals and suburban newspapers including the Southern Cross and the Sunday Observer in Melbourne. During World War II, he served in the Royal Australian Air Force (RAAF) as a pilot with RAF Bomber Command and was awarded the Distinguished Flying Cross, the Air Force Cross and the Distinguished Flying Medal.

Isaacson grew up in Melbourne and started working for a newspaper when he was sixteen. He joined the RAAF in 1940. Following his stint in Bomber Command, he became well known in Australia for his tours in the Avro Lancaster Q-for-Queenie to promote the sale of war loans and, in particular, for flying his plane under the Sydney Harbour Bridge in 1943. He transferred to the RAAF Reserve after the war, retiring as a wing commander in 1969. From 1956 he served as a Trustee, Chairman, and finally Life Governor of the Victorian Shrine of Remembrance. In 1991 he was appointed a Member of the Order of Australia for his publishing and community work.

== Early life ==
Isaacson was born in London on 31 July 1920 to an Austrian mother, Caroline "Lynka" (née Jacobson) and an Australian father, Arnold Isaacson; his parents moved to Australia with him when he was six years old. Growing up in Melbourne, he was educated at Brighton Grammar School and started work at sixteen as a messenger boy on The Age, where his mother Caroline edited women's features. All of Isaacson's immediate family would eventually serve in World War II: his father, Arnold, a World War I veteran, joined the Volunteer Defence Corps, his mother became Public Relations Officer in the Australian Women's Army Service (AWAS), and his sister Joan became a photographer with the AWAS.

== World War II ==
On 8 December 1940, the nineteen-year-old Isaacson enlisted in the Royal Australian Air Force (RAAF). After completing his training in Australia and Canada, he was posted to the United Kingdom and joined No. 460 Squadron RAAF at RAAF Breighton, Yorkshire, as a sergeant pilot. Operating Vickers Wellington medium bombers, No. 460 Squadron had been raised under the Article XV provisions of the Empire Air Training Scheme and was one of a number of nominally Australian formations taking part in RAF Bomber Command's strategic air campaign against Germany. The squadron commenced operations in March 1942 and participated in 1,000-bomber raids against Cologne, Essen and Bremen in May and June. It converted to Avro Lancaster heavy bombers in October. Isaacson was awarded the Distinguished Flying Medal on 6 November 1942 for "many successful night attacks on the enemy" with No. 460 Squadron. The following month his Lancaster was damaged by a Junkers Ju 88 night fighter after a raid on Munich.

Commissioned as a pilot officer, Isaacson was subsequently posted to No. 156 Squadron RAF of the Pathfinder Force, based at RAF Warboys, Huntingdonshire. He was awarded the Distinguished Flying Cross on 30 March 1943 for his actions during a raid on Berlin. His citation, promulgated in the London Gazette, read:

One night in March 1943, this officer was detailed for an attack on Berlin. Following the attack and while still over the target area, his aircraft was hit by anti-aircraft fire and severely damaged. The mid-upper turret frame was twisted, the perspex and 2 engine cowlings blown off, the aileron controls damaged and the aircraft forced down to 4,000 feet. On the return journey the aircraft was driven off the route and held in a cone of searchlights for 15 minutes; during this time a further loss of height down to 900 feet occurred. In the face of this perilous situation Pilot Officer Issacson, showing coolness, resolution and skilful airmanship, succeeded in flying his aircraft back to base. This officer is an outstanding captain of aircraft who has a fine record of many successful operational sorties.

Lancaster Q-for-Queenie flies under Sydney Harbour Bridge, 22 October 1943

Isaacson completed forty-five sorties with Bomber Command, when the likelihood of surviving an operational tour of thirty missions was never more than 50% and, at times, much less. Promoted to acting flight lieutenant, he was chosen in May 1943 to captain Lancaster Q-for-Queenie on a landmark flight from England to Australia across the Pacific Ocean, and then from Melbourne to New Zealand and back, non-stop in both directions. He was awarded the Air Force Cross on 27 August 1943 for this mission, the citation noting that it was "the first occasion on which an aircraft has flown to Australia by this route and the direct flights between Melbourne and New Zealand are the first of their kind". The Lancaster was brought to Australia so that it could serve as a template for local production of the type, but this never took place and it was instead used for exhibition flights to encourage purchase of war bonds. On 22 October 1943 Isaacson flew Q-for-Queenie under the Sydney Harbour Bridge, flouting a 1931 regulation that prohibited such activity; the Lancaster remains the largest aircraft to have been flown under the bridge. Isaacson gave his crew no warning of what he was about to do and when asked later why he did it, replied "Because it was there". It was, however, reported at the time that he undertook the stunt to support the war loan effort for which he and his crew were actively fundraising.

Notwithstanding the publicity the escapade generated for war loans, Isaacson recalled that when he landed at Mascot afterwards:

I was threatened with a court martial. Two authorities wanted to court martial me: Eastern Area in which the crime was committed and Southern Command to which I was attached at the time. I was told later there was a great fight among the bureaucrats of each of these commands as to which would court martial me. Apparently they could not agree on which should be the prosecutor and the idea either lapsed – or maybe is still being pursued by the successors to each of these commands!

In December 1943, following his promotional tour with his crew in Q-for-Queenie, he settled down to instructional work at an operational training unit before undertaking a further tour in the Lancaster commencing in March 1944.

== Post-war career ==
Peter and Anne Isaacson at the registry office for their wedding in 1950

Isaacson stood as the Liberal candidate for Prahran in the November 1945 Victorian state election, but was defeated by Labor's Bill Quirk. His wartime commission was terminated on 21 February 1946 and he transferred to the RAAF Reserve. He was state commandant of the Victorian Squadron of the Air Training Corps from 1950, and commandant of No. 21 (City of Melbourne) Squadron from 1961, before retiring in 1969 with the rank of wing commander. He also served as an honorary aide-de-camp to Queen Elizabeth II from 1963 to 1965.

After working as aviation correspondent for The Argus in Melbourne, Isaacson set up his first newspaper, the Advertiser, in 1947; he established Peter Isaacson Publications the same year. The Advertiser took over other community newspapers and became the Southern Cross, which Isaacson edited and published along with Sunday Observer and various business and industry magazines. In 1986 Peter Isaacson Publications took over the Asher Joel Media Group. Southern Cross was bought by APN News & Media in 1993 and Isaacson became APN's director, serving until 1998. He chaired TW Media from 1997 to 2005.

Isaacson married Anne McIntyre in Melbourne on 21 December 1950. The couple, who had known each other since their teens, had delayed their wedding during Anne's five-year struggle with polio and Isaacson carried his future bride to the registry office on the day. The marriage produced two sons. On 10 June 1991 Isaacson was appointed a Member of the Order of Australia "for services to the print media and the community". He published As I Remember Them: Men and Women Who Shaped a Life, a collection of eulogies he had delivered for friends and colleagues, in 2012. In May of that year he was among a group of thirty-two veterans selected to attend the dedication of the RAF Bomber Command Memorial in London as part of the official Australian delegation. Isaacson was a Life Governor of the Victorian Shrine of Remembrance, having previously served as a Trustee from 1956 to 2000, and Chairman from 1983 to 2000. He and his wife lived in the Melbourne suburb of Toorak. Following a short illness, Isaacson died on 7 April 2017 in Melbourne aged 96. He was survived by his sons; Anne had died the year before.
