= Cathedral of Cúcuta =

Coordinates: 7.8864°N 72.5035°W

- Cathedral of San José de Cúcuta
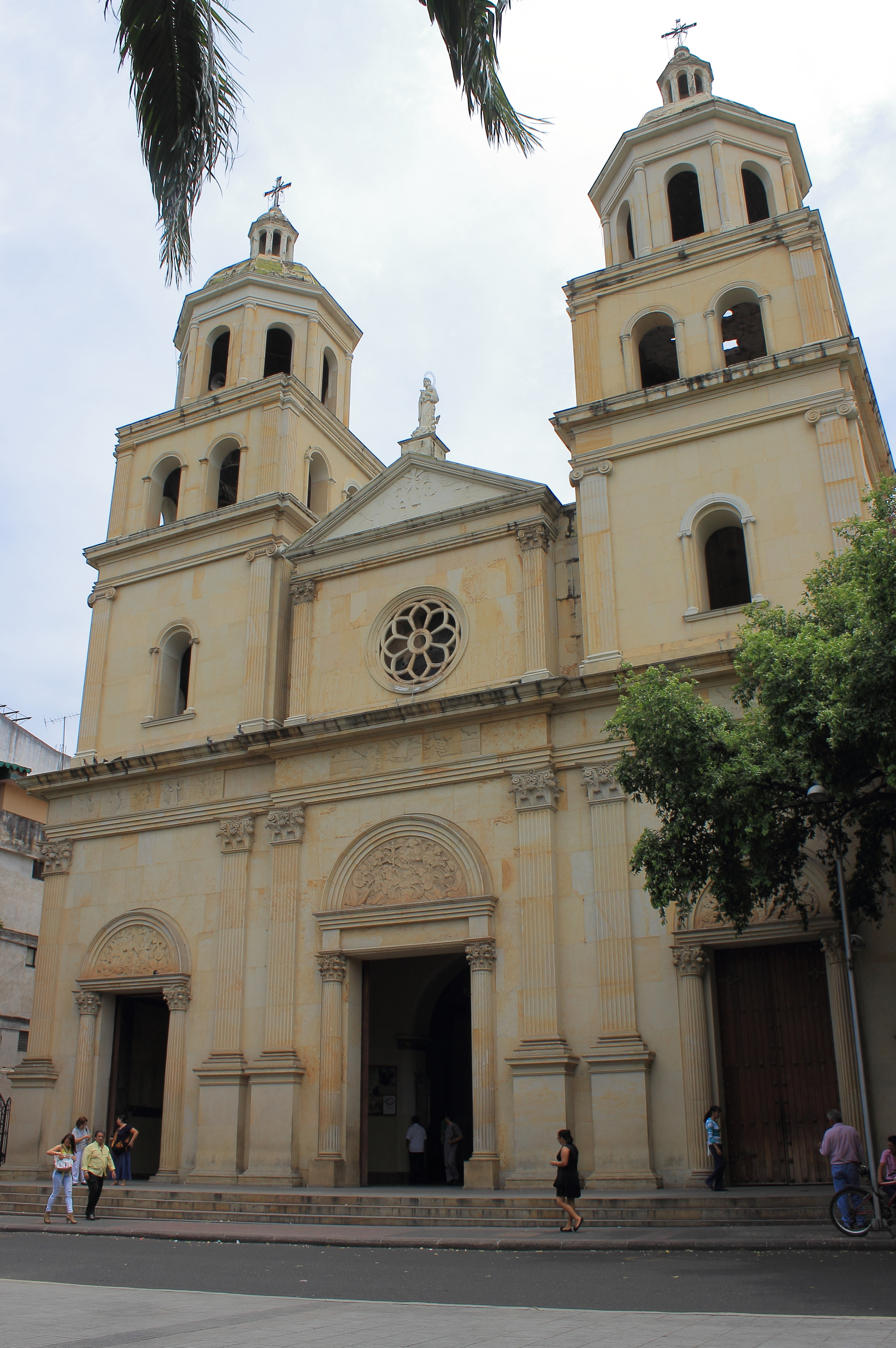
- Cathedral of Cúcuta
- Location: Cucuta
- Country: Colombia
- Denomination: Roman Catholic

History
- Founded: March 09, 1734
- Founder: Antonio Claudio Alvarez de Quiñonez

Administration
- Diocese: Roman Catholic Diocese of Cúcuta

Clergy
- Priest: Víctor Manuel Ochoa Cadavid

The Cathedral of San José de Cúcuta is a Catholic cathedral in the city of Cúcuta (Colombia). It lies in the center of the town, in front of Santander Park and close to the city hall. It is considered to be the historic and cultural heart of the city. The cathedral is the headquarters of the Bishop of Cúcuta, and became the main church of the Diocese of Cúcuta on May 29, 1959, when it was consecrated by Pope Pio XII. It is predominantly of pure Romanesque style, with an imposing facade of stone veneer.

== History ==
Not much is known about its construction. The foundation stone was laid on 12 May 1889, and the building commemorates the creation of the parish in 1734. The church was destroyed by the 1875 Cúcuta earthquake. The restoration of the temple was demanded by the community of Cucuta, but due to economic difficulties and the rising conflict by the two principal parties in Colombia, its reconstruction was delayed by several years. It was only in 1905 that the recently elected priest Demetrio Mendoza decided to begin construction of the new temple. In 1956 it was given the category of Cathedral of Diocese.

Inside are the remains of the First Bishop of Cúcuta Monseñor Luis Hernandez. It is noteworthy that houses pictures of the painter cucuteño Salvador Moreno. The 19 March 1920 (day of San José), opened the organ in this building, donated by Rudesindo Soto.

== Gallery ==
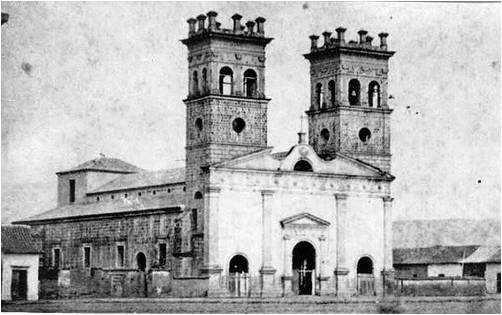
The church as built initially

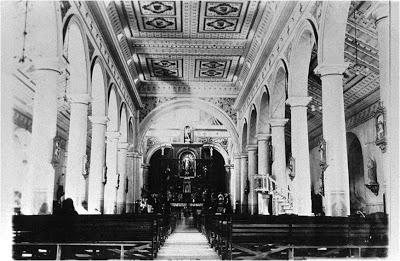
Church Interior before the earthquake

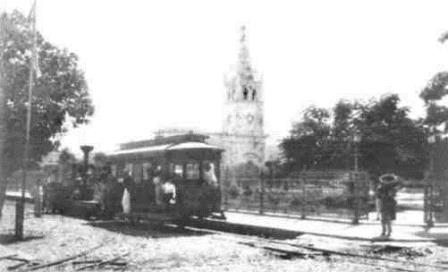
Old facade

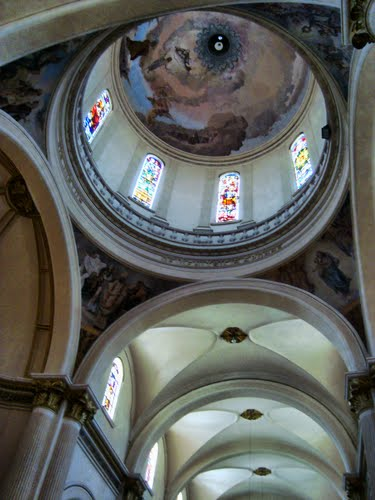
Interior view of one of the domes

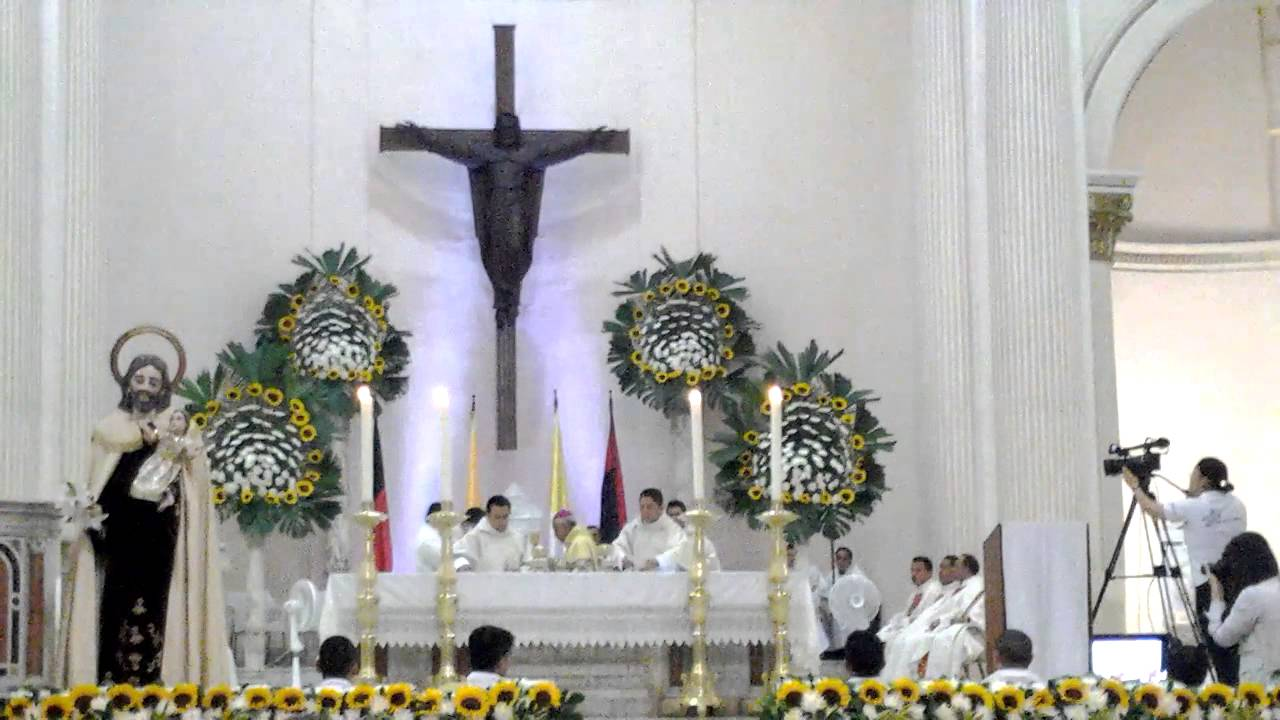
An ongoing Eucharistia

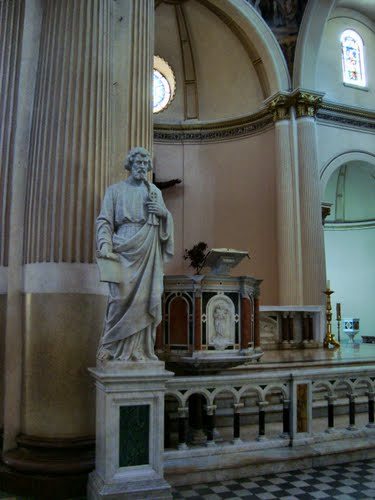
Figure of San pedro.

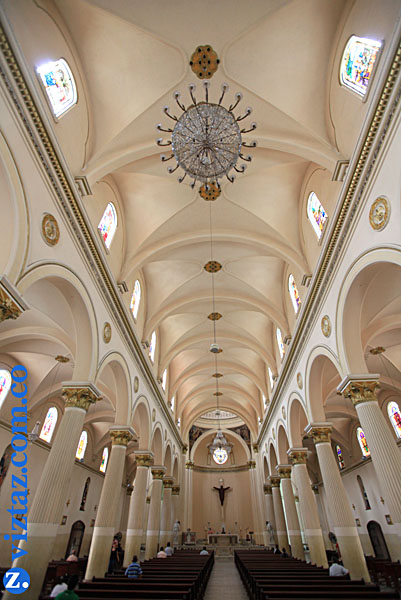
Interior view from the entrance
