= Marcia Isakson =

American acoustical engineer

Marcia Joyce Isakson (born 1970, née Geiger, also published as Marcia J. Geiger) is an American physicist who directs the Signal and Information Sciences Laboratory of the Applied Research Laboratories at the University of Texas at Austin. She is also a former president of the Acoustical Society of America, and holds an affiliate faculty position as a lecturer in the university's Walker Department of Mechanical Engineering. Her research concerns modeling and understanding the behavior of sonar in shallow ocean water, with applications in mapping tidal regions and in national defense.

== Education and career ==
Isakson is originally from Hereford, Texas, but moved twice as a teenager to Chicago and Connecticut, where she attended New Milford High School. She graduated from the United States Military Academy in West Point, New York in 1992, with a bachelor's degree in engineering physics and mathematics, including an internship at the Brookhaven National Laboratory. After a 1994 master's degree in physics from the University of Texas at Austin, as a Hertz Foundation Fellow, and ordnance officer training at the Aberdeen Proving Grounds, she became a battalion operations officer in the United States Army from 1994 to 1997, serving as a captain at Fort Hood. Returning to the University of Texas for continued graduate study in physics, she completed her Ph.D. in 2002. Her dissertation, The Effects of Alignment on the Dissociation of H_{2} on Pd(111), was advised by Greg Sitz.

She joined the Applied Research Laboratories of the University of Texas at Austin in 2001. There, she began her work in underwater acoustics, despite her previous physics research being entirely focused on lasers, electromagnetic radiation, and "the dynamics of gas- surface reactions". She also holds a lecturer position in mechanical engineering at the university, and taught underwater acoustics there beginning in 2009.

She became president of the Acoustical Society of America for the 2017–2018 term. This led her to shift her work at the Applied Research Laboratories from research to management, and in 2021 she became director of the Signal and Information Sciences Laboratory.

== Recognition ==
Isakson was elected as a Fellow of the Acoustical Society of America in 2013, "for contributions to modeling shallow water acoustic propagation using the finite element method".

== Personal life ==
Isakson is married to John Isakson, an electronics engineer and former artillery officer. They have two children, medical imaging researcher Grace Isakson-Murley and defense software engineering contractor Nicholas Isakson.
