= Colombia Diversa =

Colombian LGBT rights organization

Colombia Diversa is an organization based in Bogotá that promotes and defends LGBT rights in Colombia. It was founded in 2004 by a group of activists who met in 2003 while advocating for a failed bill recognizing the rights of same-sex couples. The original goal of Colombia Diversa was to create a better situation for same-sex couples. Colombia Diversa has been referred to as "the country's leading LGBT organization" by GLAAD.

Since constitutional rights including marriage, adoption, military service, etc. were instituted in Colombia, the organization has focused on violence including homicide directed at LGBT people. Their current mission statement is "in order to live in an equal society for all, we carry out strategic litigation, advocacy and research on the human rights of lesbians, gays, bisexuals and trans people in Colombia." Furthermore, the organization's three main areas of focus are legal advice, human rights, and peace and post-conflict. Since 2004, Colombia Diversa has also published reports with topics ranging from violence to education, as well as statistics on violence towards LGBT individuals.

== See also ==
- LGBTQ rights in Colombia
- Human rights in Colombia
