= Miguel Uribe Turbay =

Colombian politician (1986–2025)

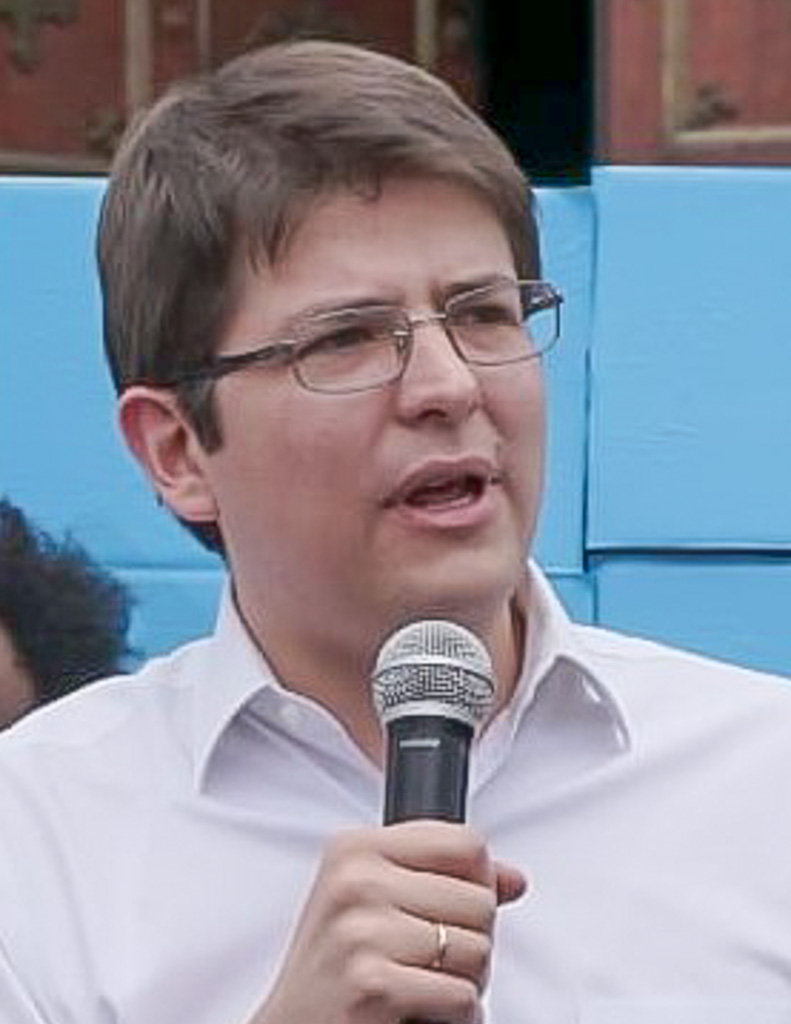
- Uribe in 2019

Senator of Colombia
- In office 20 July 2022 – 11 August 2025

Secretary of Government of Bogotá
- In office 1 January 2016 – 22 October 2018
- Mayor: Enrique Peñalosa
- Preceded by: Gloria Flórez
- Succeeded by: Juan Miguel Durán

Bogotá City Councilor
- In office 1 January 2012 – 31 December 2015
- Leader: Horacio José Serpa

Personal details
- Born: Miguel Uribe Turbay; 28 January 1986 Bogotá, Colombia
- Died: 11 August 2025 (aged 39) Bogotá, Colombia
- Cause of death: Assassination (gunshot wounds)
- Party: Democratic Centre (2021–2025)
- Other political affiliations: Liberal (2010–2018); Independent (2018–2020)
- Spouse: María Claudia Tarazona (m. 2016)
- Children: 1
- Parents: Miguel Uribe Londoño (father); Diana Turbay (mother)
- Relatives: Julio César Turbay Ayala (grandfather); Nydia Quintero (grandmother); Julio César Turbay Quintero (uncle); Claudia Turbay (aunt); Paola Turbay (cousin)
- Education: University of the Andes (MA); Harvard University (MA)
- Website: migueluribe.com

Miguel Uribe Turbay (Spanish: [miˈɣel uˈɾiβe tuɾˈβaj]; 28 January 1986 – 11 August 2025) was a Colombian politician who served as a member of the Senate of Colombia from 2022 until his assassination in 2025. A member of the Democratic Centre political party, he had been seeking the party's nomination for the 2026 presidential election.

Miguel Uribe Turbay was the grandson of former president Julio César Turbay Ayala. On 7 June 2025, he was shot in the head during a rally in Bogotá and died two months later, on 11 August.

== Background ==
Miguel Uribe Turbay was born in Bogotá, Colombia, in 1986, to Diana Turbay and Miguel Uribe Londoño. The prominent Turbay family are descended from Lebanese immigrants who arrived in Colombia at the end of the 19th century. His maternal grandfather, Julio César Turbay Ayala, the son of a Lebanese immigrant, served as president of Colombia from 1978 to 1982, making his maternal grandmother, Nydia Quintero Turbay the first lady of Colombia during that period.

Uribe's mother, Diana Turbay, was a lawyer, journalist, and director of the news program Criptón. In 1990, she was kidnapped by the Medellín Cartel and, in 1991, killed during a botched rescue attempt. Following his mother's death, Miguel Uribe Turbay was raised by his father, Miguel Uribe Londoño, a former Bogotá city councilor, Conservative Party senator, and head of the National Federation of Cocoa Growers.

Uribe Turbay held a law degree and a master's in public policy from the University of the Andes, as well as a master's in public administration from the Harvard School of Government.

== Political career ==
=== Bogotá City Councillor ===
In 2012, Uribe was elected as a Bogotá city councillor at age 25 after campaigning alongside other Colombian Liberal Party politicians such as David Luna, Juan Manuel Galán, and Simón Gaviria (son of former president César Gaviria). In his first year as councillor, he was selected by journalists as "revelation councillor of the year" and, in 2014, was elected president of the District Council after receiving 32 of 45 available votes.

He was characterized as one of the leading opponents of Bogotá mayor Gustavo Petro, whose handling of the new garbage collection system and social programs he criticized.

=== Secretary of Government ===
In 2016, at age 30, he was appointed secretary of government under mayor Enrique Peñalosa, becoming the youngest Secretary of Government in Bogotá's history after receiving support from then-Vice President of the Republic Germán Vargas Lleras for the position.

During his tenure as secretary of government, the homicide rate in Bogotá decreased slightly in 2018, while it increased nationwide for the first time in five years. However, in the first half of 2019, thefts increased by 17% and the perception of insecurity rose.

In 2016, the Legal Office of Bogotá's Secretary of Government issued a legal opinion on the femicide of Rosa Elvira Cely that generated controversy for its victim-blaming tone. Uribe Turbay clarified that he was not consulted on this opinion and offered apologies to the Cely family.

=== Mayoral candidacy for Bogotá ===
In 2018, he resigned from his position as secretary of government to run for mayor of Bogotá in 2019. His candidacy was registered independently through the significant citizen movement "Avancemos" (Let's Move Forward), which obtained 400,000 signatures validated by the National Civil Registry. His campaign was joined by various sectors and political parties including the Liberal Party, Conservative Party, Colombia Justa Libres, MIRA Party, and the Democratic Centre, which withdrew its support from candidate Ángela Garzón when it decided Uribe Turbay was a more viable option. His campaign proposal focused on defending Enrique Peñalosa's mayoral programs, especially the elevated Metro project, urbanizing the Thomas van der Hammen Forest Reserve, creating multimodal transportation systems, and generally continuing the infrastructure plan and proposals left by the previous administration.

Uribe Turbay obtained 426,982 votes, finishing in fourth place, reflecting the low popularity of Peñalosa's administration, of which he had been one of the most visible officials. The mayoral election was ultimately won by Claudia López.

=== Senate of the Republic ===
On 5 December 2021, former president Álvaro Uribe announced that he would use his extraordinary powers as supreme leader of the Democratic Centre to designate Miguel Uribe Turbay as the head of the Senate list. This decision was accepted but not well received by veteran party members such as María Fernanda Cabal and Paloma Valencia. Thanks to this position, Uribe Turbay received the most votes on the open list and was elected on 13 March 2022 as senator.

=== Prospective presidential candidacy ===
On 4 March 2025, Miguel Uribe Turbay officially announced his intention to seek the presidency as a candidate for his party, the Democratic Centre. Uribe faced María Fernanda Cabal, Paloma Valencia, Andrés Guerra, and Paola Holguín. According to polls conducted at the end of 2024, Miguel Uribe appeared as the collective's favorite, slightly surpassing Cabal. However, the other prospective candidates questioned the reliability of these polls.

== Assassination ==
=== Attack ===
On 7 June 2025, Uribe Turbay was shot from behind during a rally at El Golfito Park in the Modelia neighborhood of Fontibón, Bogotá. The BBC reported that he was "shot three times – reportedly twice in the head". After he was shot, a gunfight took place between his bodyguards and the gunman, who was shot in the foot. Bystanders also beat the fleeing perpetrator before he was taken into custody. Two other people were injured during the attack. In the video footage recorded at the time of the suspect's arrest, he can be heard shouting, "I'm sorry, I did it for the money, for my family".

=== Treatment and suspects ===
Uribe Turbay was transported to Engativá Medical Center in west Bogotá. Later that night, he was transported by ambulance to the Fundación Santa Fe de Bogotá, where chief neurosurgeon Dr. Fernando Hakim led a combined neuro-surgical and peripheral-vascular operation. In a bulletin issued at 01:10 on 8 June, the hospital said that he had been admitted in critical condition. The procedure was successful and Uribe Turbay left the operating theater alive. Despite showing signs of neurological improvement, he remained in an "extremely serious" condition in the intensive-care unit following the initial surgery. On 16 June, he underwent another emergency surgery due to bleeding in his brain.

The suspect, described as a 15-year-old boy, was detained. Authorities indicated that they believed he was a contract killer hired by others. The suspect pleaded not guilty in court on 10 June. On 13 June, Colombian prosecutors charged an alleged accomplice, who had turned himself in. A man accused of being the mastermind of the shooting was arrested in Bogotá on 5 July 2025. On 27 August 2025, the teenage suspect was sentenced to a seven-year confinement at a youth rehabilitation facility.

=== Death and funeral ===
In the early morning of 11 August, around two months after the shooting, Turbay died at a hospital in Bogotá at the age of 39. Uribe Turbay lay in state on 11 August in the Elliptical Hall of the National Capitol until the afternoon of 13 August. Following the death of Uribe Turbay, President Gustavo Petro declared 12 August, a day of national mourning. His coffin was transported to the Primate Cathedral of Bogotá by members of the 37th Infantry Presidential Guard Battalion. The service was presided over by the Cardinal Primate of Colombia, Luis José Rueda Aparicio. Following Uribe Turbay's death, his family requested that President Gustavo Petro and Vice President Francia Márquez not attend. Several foreign leaders attended Uribe Turbay's service: U.S. Deputy Secretary of State Christopher Landau. Among those who attended the funeral were former Presidents of Colombia César Gaviria, Ernesto Samper, and Juan Manuel Santos; former First Ladies Ana Milena Muñoz de Gaviria, Jacquin Strouss de Samper, Nohra Puyana de Pastrana, Lina Moreno de Uribe, and María Clemencia de Santos; and former Vice President Marta Lucía Ramírez. Former Presidents Andrés Pastrana and Iván Duque were not present, while former President Álvaro Uribe was unable to attend due to his house arrest. Neither were former Vice Presidents Humberto De la Calle, Gustavo Bell, Francisco Santos, Angelino Garzón, Germán Vargas Lleras, and Óscar Naranjo. Also present mayor of Bogotá Carlos Fernando Galán and First lady Carolina Deik.

The service concluded with a performance by Yuri Buenaventura. Uribe Turbay's burial took place in the central nave of the Central Cemetery of Bogotá. The service included a prayer service presided over by Monsignor Fadi Abou Chebel, Apostolic Exarch of Bogotá and leader of the Mariamite Maronite Order. The ceremony honored the Lebanese origins of the Turbay family.

=== Aftermath ===
On 26 August 2025, Uribe Turbay's father, Miguel Uribe Londoño, launched his presidential campaign, saying that he intended to continue his son's legacy.

== Personal life ==
In 2016, he married María Claudia Tarazona, with whom he had a son, Alejandro, and participated in raising his wife's three daughters.
