= Miguel Uribe =

Miguel Uribe may refer to:

- Miguel Uribe Restrepo (1792–1842), Colombian politician, contended in the 1833 Colombian presidential election
- Miguel Uribe Londoño (born 1952), Colombian businessman and politician, 2026 presidential hopeful
- Miguel Uribe Turbay (1986–2025), Colombian senator, assassinated during the 2026 Colombian presidential election
- Miguel Uribe (footballer) (born 1995), Colombian footballer
- Miguel Uribe (actor), appeared in El secreto de Puente Viejo
