= Assassination of Miguel Uribe Turbay =

2025 political murder in Colombia

- Part of the 2026 Colombian presidential election
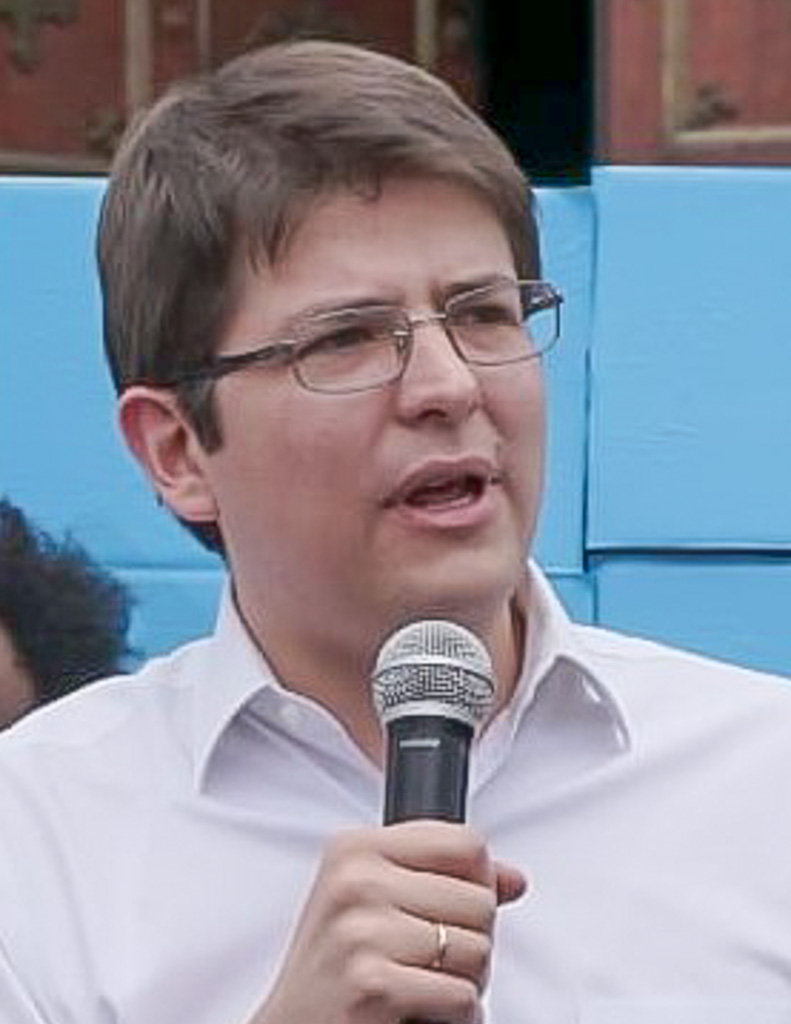
- Uribe Turbay in 2019

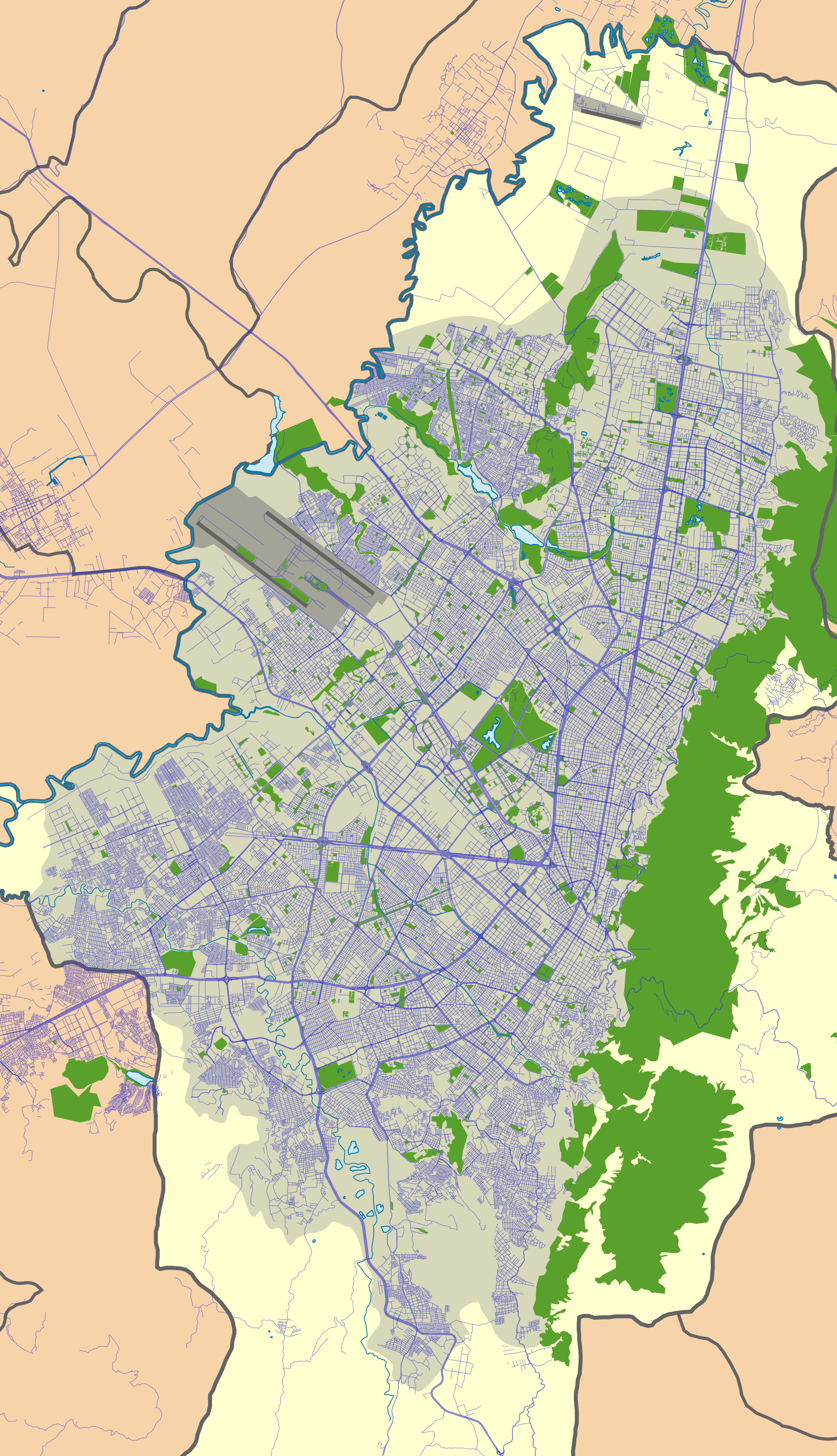
- Location: 4.6652°N 74.1270°W; El Golfito Park, Modelia, Fontibón, Bogotá, Colombia
- Date: 7 June 2025 c. 5:00 p.m. (UTC−05:00)
- Target: Miguel Uribe Turbay
- Attack type: Assassination, shooting
- Weapon: 9mm Glock-style pistol
- Deaths: 1 (Uribe; died on 11 August 2025)
- Injuries: 3 (including the suspect)
- Assailant: 15-year-old boy
- Motive: Under investigation
- Accused: 6 (including accomplices)

On 7 June 2025, Miguel Uribe Turbay, a senator and pre-candidate in the 2026 Colombian presidential election, was shot during a rally at El Golfito Park in the neighbourhood of Modelia, part of the locality of Fontibón, in Bogotá, Colombia. He was hospitalised in critical condition and died two months later from his injuries.

== Background ==
Uribe Turbay was a conservative Colombian politician. His grandfather, Julio César Turbay Ayala, was the 25th president of Colombia and his mother, journalist Diana Turbay, was kidnapped by the Medellín Cartel in 1990 and killed during a botched rescue attempt the following year.

At the time of the attack, Uribe Turbay was serving as a member of the Senate of Colombia and running as a pre-candidate for the Democratic Centre in the 2026 presidential election.

== Assassination ==
=== Attack ===
On 7 June 2025, Uribe Turbay was shot from behind during a rally at El Golfito Park in Modelia, Fontibón, Bogotá. The BBC reported that he was shot three times, including two shots to the head. Two other people were injured, and the suspected gunman was wounded in the foot during an exchange of fire with bodyguards.

=== Treatment ===
Turbay was transported first to the Engativá Medical Center and then to the Fundación Santa Fe de Bogotá, where a combined neurosurgical and peripheral-vascular operation was performed. On 16 June, he underwent emergency surgery due to bleeding in his brain, and on 10 August his condition became critical again after another cerebral haemorrhage.

=== Declared death ===
Uribe Turbay died at the Fundación Santa Fe on 11 August 2025, aged 39, of complications from his injuries. President Gustavo Petro declared 12 August as a day of national mourning. Uribe's remains were laid in state at the National Congress before being taken to the Primatial Cathedral of Bogotá for his funeral mass on 13 August. He was then buried at the Central Cemetery of Bogotá. Neither Petro nor Vice President Francia Márquez attended the ceremonies, citing the wishes of Uribe's family.

=== Investigation and legal proceedings ===
A teenage suspect was arrested at the scene. Authorities initially described him as a minor and later said a 15-year-old was charged with attempted homicide and illegal possession of a firearm. In a video recorded during his arrest, the youth said he did it for money from a drug dealer. His mother was deceased, and his father lived abroad. According to President Gustavo Petro, he quit the courses of "Youth in Peace", was highly-conflicted and had social difficulties.

On the day of the attack, the Ministry of National Defence offered a reward of up to 3 billion pesos for information leading to those responsible. Investigators said the 9mm Glock-style pistol recovered at the scene had been legally purchased on 6 August 2020 in Mesa, Arizona, United States; how it entered Colombia remained under investigation.

Prosecutors later charged additional suspects alleged to have provided logistics and reconnaissance. On 5 July 2025, police announced the arrest in Bogotá of a man accused of masterminding the attack: Elder José Arteaga Hernández ("Chipi" or "Costeño"). As of August 2025, authorities had not publicly established a motive.

=== Suspects arrested ===
In total, six people have been arrested in connection with the case: the teenage suspect, charged with attempted homicide and unlawful possession of a firearm; Carlos Eduardo Mora González, alleged to have provided logistical support; Katerine Andrea Martínez, accused of participating in the planning; William Fernando González Cruz, allegedly tasked with picking up those involved; Elder José Arteaga Hernández, implicated by the authorities as being the person who ordered the attack; and a sixth person, arrested on 18 July, who is alleged to have been an escape driver. All have pleaded not guilty.

On 27 August 2025, the teenage suspect was sentenced to a seven-year confinement at a youth rehabilitation facility.

== Reactions ==
=== Domestic ===
President Gustavo Petro posted a message of solidarity on X, condemning the attack and recalling the 1991 killing of the senator's mother, journalist Diana Turbay.

The national government announced a cross-party meeting for 9 June 2025 to discuss measures to strengthen security for candidates in the run-up to the 2026 elections; the meeting was later suspended after several opposition parties—including the Democratic Centre, Radical Change and the Conservative Party—declined to attend. The government said it would seek alternative mechanisms, including an electoral monitoring commission.

President Petro and other government officials raised concerns about Uribe Turbay's protection on the day of the attack; Petro said the candidate's security detail had been reduced shortly before the shooting and ordered an investigation. The defence ministry offered a monetary reward for information and the government announced stepped-up protection measures for other candidates.

While Uribe Turbay was undergoing surgery and treatment at Fundación Santa Fe clinic, several political figures visited him in hospital, including Bogotá mayor Carlos Fernando Galán and former presidents Álvaro Uribe and César Gaviria.

Authorities said the arrested minor appeared to have acted as a paid hitman and was likely a material perpetrator in a wider plot; the Attorney General's Office described the suspect as "the last link" in a chain and investigators pursued possible organisers and accomplices. The teen formally pleaded not guilty to charges in June.

Human Rights Watch said that the attack risked deterring political participation and called for prompt, transparent investigations.

=== International ===
Regional leaders and international organisations condemned the attack. The Organization of American States issued a statement condemning the violence and calling for a swift, thorough investigation. The United Nations Secretary-General expressed sorrow and called for a full investigation. The EEAS also expressed condolences and urged Colombian authorities to identify and bring to justice those responsible.

Heads of state and senior politicians in the region publicly condemned the attack; those issuing statements or messages of condemnation included Chilean president Gabriel Boric, Ecuadorian president Daniel Noboa and Venezuelan opposition leader María Corina Machado.

Several U.S. leaders condemned the attack, including Secretary of State Marco Rubio and Representative María Elvira Salazar of Florida, who urged that those responsible face judicial proceedings and called for greater security measures for political figures.

Coverage compiled by Reuters and other outlets recorded statements urging calm, demanding a transparent investigation, and calling for protections for political actors.

=== Aftermath and official follow-up ===
In the weeks following the attack, authorities arrested multiple suspects who were alleged to have roles in planning, logistics or facilitating the shooting; prosecutors said investigations remained ongoing into the alleged masterminds behind the operation. The attack prompted renewed debate in Colombia about political rhetoric, candidate protection, and the use of minors by criminal groups.

On 26 August 2025, Uribe Turbay's father, Miguel Uribe Londoño, launched his presidential campaign, saying that he intended to continue his son's legacy.

== See also ==
- List of assassinations in Colombia
