= Balcazar =

Balcazar is a surname. Notable people with the name include:

- Alfonso Balcázar (1926–1993), Spanish screenwriter, film director and producer
- Apolinar Hernández Balcazar, Mexican award-winning basket maker
- Carlos Balcázar (born 1984), Mexican footballer
- Gustavo Balcázar Monzón (born 1927), Colombian lawyer and retired politician
- Javier Hernandez Balcazar (born 1988), Mexican footballer
- José María Balcázar (born 1943), 66th President of Peru
- Juan Castillo Balcazar (born 1970), Chilean footballer
- Judith Balcazar (born 1953), Australian-British entrepreneur and fashion designer
- Tomás Balcázar (1931–2020), Mexican footballer
