= Diana Turbay =

Colombian journalist (1950–1991)

Diana Turbay Quintero
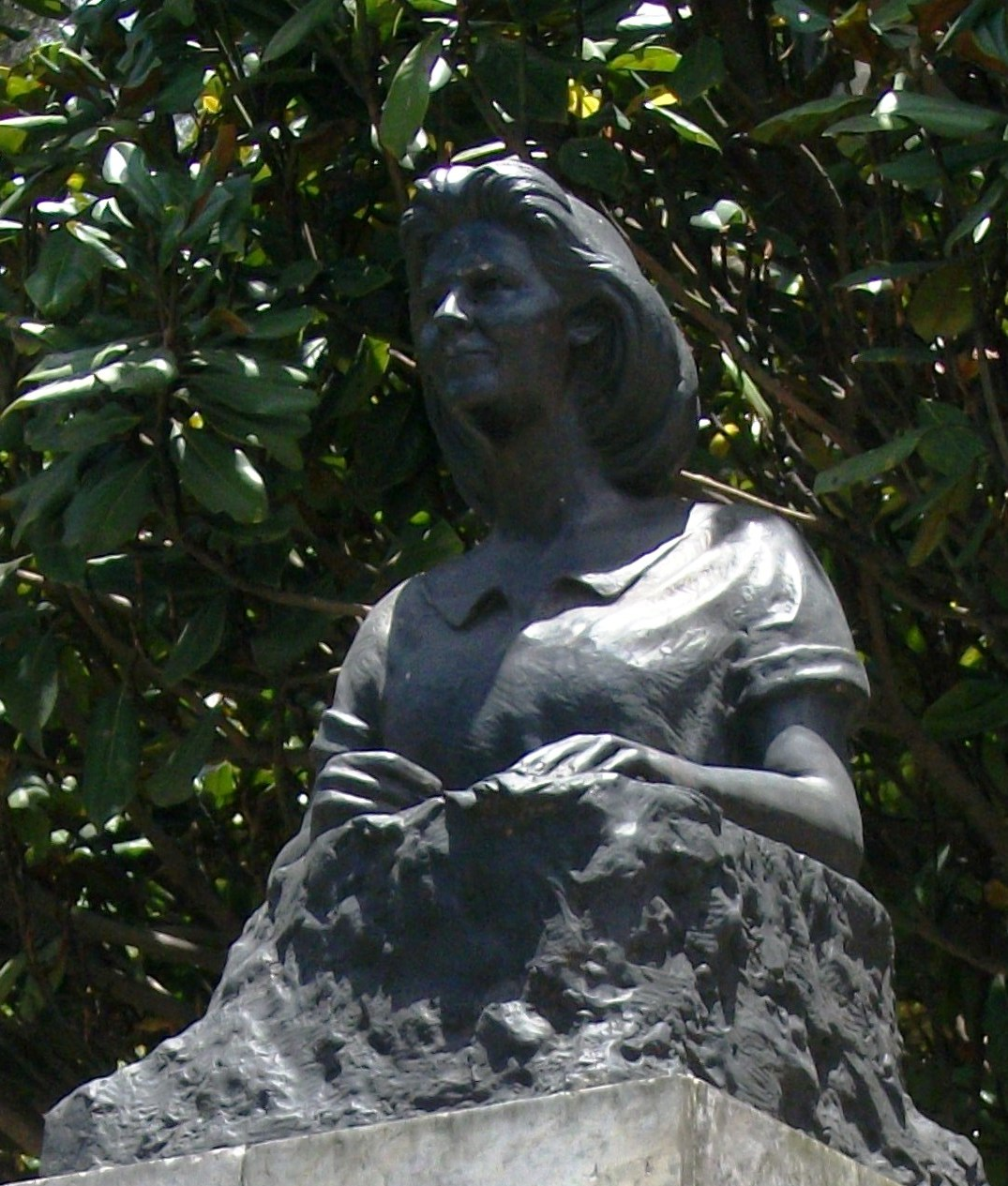
- Bust of Diana Turbay
- Born: Diana Consuelo Turbay Quintero; March 9, 1950; Bogotá, Colombia
- Died: January 25, 1991 (aged 40); Medellín, Antioquia, Colombia
- Occupation: Journalist
- Spouse(s): Luis Francisco Hoyos Villegas (divorced); Miguel Uribe Londoño
- Children: 2, including Miguel
- Parent(s): Julio César Turbay Ayala; Nydia Quintero Turbay
- Relatives: Julio César Turbay Quintero (brother); Claudia Turbay Quintero (sister)

Diana Consuelo Turbay Quintero (9 March 1950 – 25 January 1991) was a Colombian journalist kidnapped by the Medellín Cartel and killed during a botched rescue attempt. Her story has been portrayed in a non-fiction book by Gabriel García Márquez and on-screen.

== Early years ==
Diana Turbay was born on 9 March 1950, in Bogotá to Julio César Turbay Ayala, who would later be the 25th president of Colombia (1978–1982) and Nydia Quintero Turbay. Her father was her mother's maternal uncle. The Turbay family were originally from Lebanon and her family still belong to, and frequent, the Club Colombo Libanés, a private social club in Bogotá for prominent Lebanese-Colombians.

== Personal life ==
Turbay was married twice: to Luis Francisco Hoyos Villegas, and later to politician Miguel Uribe Londoño. She had two children: María Carolina Hoyos, a journalist and activist, and Miguel Uribe Turbay, who became a senator and was assassinated in 2025 while campaigning for the 2026 Colombian presidential election.

== Kidnapping and death ==
Turbay was kidnapped on 30 August 1990, when she was tricked into going to a supposed interview with a guerrilla leader, the Spanish priest Manuel Pérez Martínez, alias El Cura Pérez (The Priest Pérez). An unidentified man had contacted Turbay by phone. Later, a police investigation determined that the man was a member of Los Priscos, a criminal band, and had been hired by Pablo Escobar.

The latter's aim was to kidnap as many politicians and journalists as possible, to prevent Colombian legislators from approving an extradition treaty with the United States. Additional victims include Francisco Santos Calderón and Maruja Pachón.

Turbay was kept at Copacabana, Antioquia, with her cameraman Richard Becerra. She died on 25 January 1991, during a botched rescue operation launched by the police without authorization from the family. The cause of death was a bullet in her back, which partially destroyed her liver and left kidney. Becerra was rescued unharmed.

== In popular culture ==
=== Literature ===
The story of Turbay's abduction is recounted in Gabriel García Márquez's non-fiction book News of a Kidnapping (1996).

=== Television ===
Turbay is portrayed by actress Liesel Potdevin in the TV series Pablo Escobar: El Patrón del Mal (2012).

Turbay is portrayed by Gabriela de la Garza in the Netflix original series Narcos (2015).

Turbay is portrayed by Majida Issa in the Amazon Prime Video series Noticia de un Secuestro (2022), based on García Márquez's book.

== See also ==
- List of kidnappings
- List of solved missing person cases
