= Judith Balcazar =

Australian-British entrepreneur (born 1953)

- Born: 1953 (age 72–73)
- Occupations: Entrepreneur and fashion designer
- Known for: Co-founder of Wall Luxury Essentials and Giggle Knickers

Judith Balcazar (born 1953) is an Australian-British entrepreneur and fashion designer who co-founded fashion company, Wall Luxury Essentials and Giggle Knickers with Anne Davidson. She was listed among the BBC’s 100 most influential women in 2018 for her earth-friendly invention, Giggle Knickers, a company which makes special underwear for women suffering from urinary incontinence.

== Biography ==
Born in Australia, Balcazar created the Sydney-based company Traders of the Lost Art in the 1980s. This work included her being sent on a trip to Peru to buy new fashion styles and artistic works and it was there that she first met Hernán Balcazar while he was a self-employed chinaware factory owner in Lima, Peru. They married in 1990 and spent time in both of their home countries before moving to the United Kingdom. After conducting a year long sabbatical in 1993 and going on an international trip to Thailand and India, they came up with the idea of combining cultures from around the world to sell luxury clothing that was comfortable to wear at the same time. This led to Balcazar founding the company Wall alongside Hernán in 1997 to focus on said luxury clothing, often based on Peruvian designs and alpaca wool, that allowed for variable sizes and promoted independent clothing producers without issues of poor worker safety and wages. One of the primary lines of clothing sold at the shop was knitwear of Peruvian design, the production of which was outsourced to the Patacancha people of Peru. Initially opened at a location in Notting Hill, the boutique was quickly successful and an additional location was created in Edinburgh. In 2016, Balcazar set up a joint project with students studying interior design and textiles at the Royal College of Art to create wearable shelter clothing for refugees that can be turned into tents and other shelter materials, while otherwise acting as clothing.

Later in her life, Balcazar had a bout of urinary incontinence briefly following a surgery to remove a benign tumor from her bladder; this weakened her muscles. This prompted her to start looking for adult incontinence knickers. She then conceived of an idea for designing washable incontinence panties that would not clog up landfill on her own. She shared this idea with her longtime friend, Anne Davidson and they started working on it together. They first attempted to gain funding through online crowdfunding for the enterprise before going onto the BBC program Dragons' Den to pitch their idea, which they had named Giggle Knickers. While the idea was supported, they didn't win on the show and then applied for a government loan, where they received an initial fund of $32,000. At the same time, both Balcazar and Davidson invested over $5,000 each of their own savings into the startup. Judith also trained as a psychotherapist and spent from 2018-2021 studying psychology from a neuroscience perspective at Essex University.

Since founding Giggle Knickers, Balcazar has further expanded her work into psychotherapy, specialising in relationship therapy. She is a certified couples therapist in Relational Life Therapy (RLT), a relationship therapy model developed by Terry Real. She has since launched her own private practice, offering therapy sessions online to clients worldwide. Her therapeutic work integrates RLT with mindfulness, cognitive behavioural approaches, attachment theory, trauma-informed practice, and neuroscience, drawing on over two decades of professional experience working with individuals and couples internationally.
