= Miguel Uribe Londoño =

Colombian businessman and politician (born 1945)

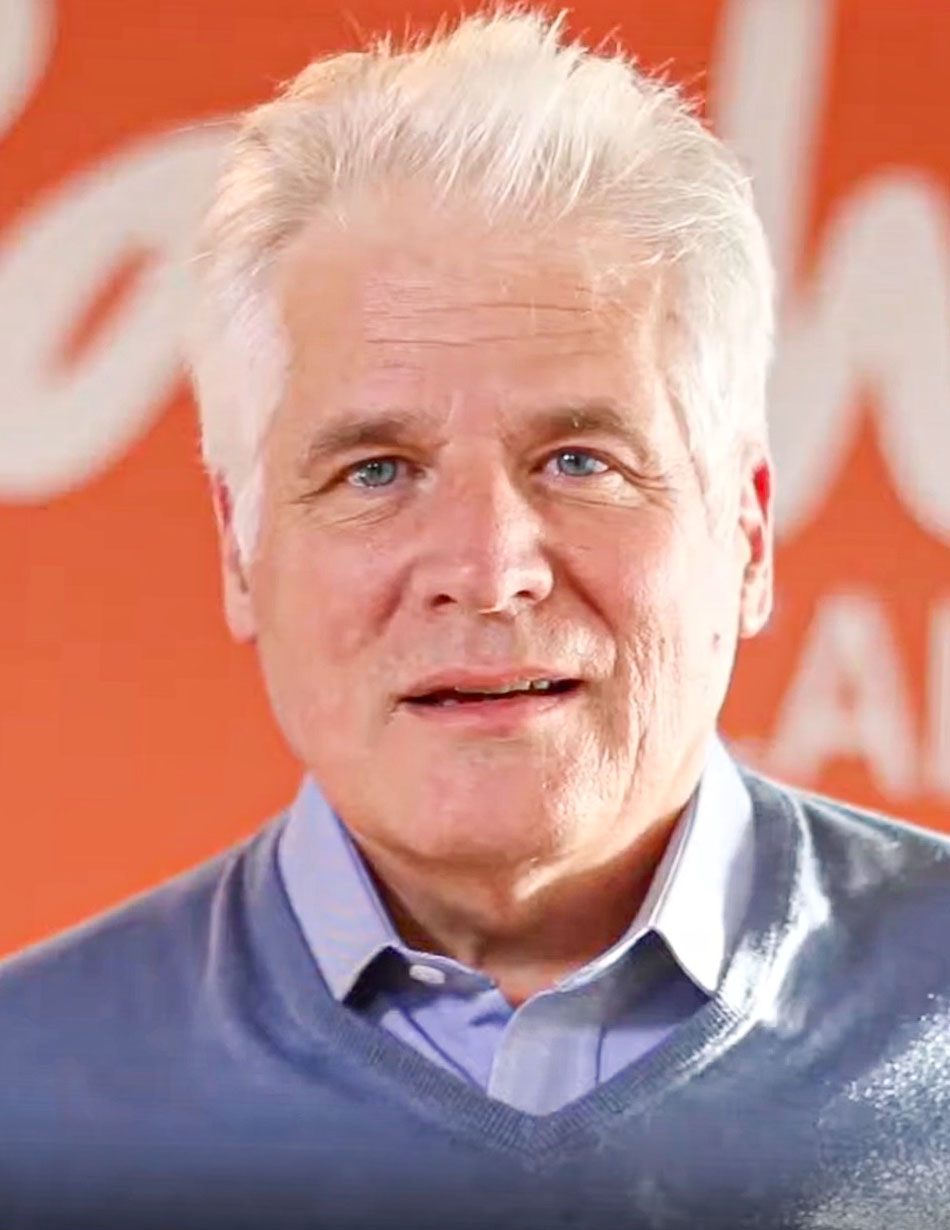
- Uribe Londoño c. 2025.

Director of Democratic Centre in Bogotá
- In office May 2013 – June 2015
- President: Gabriel Vallejo
- Preceded by: Position established
- Succeeded by: Óscar Iván Zuluaga

President of the National Federation of Cocoa Growers
- In office 1989–1997

Senator of Colombia
- In office 20 July 1990 – 4 July 1991

Economic Secretary of the Presidency
- In office 1979–1982
- President: Julio César Turbay Ayala

Personal details
- Born: 2 November 1952 (age 73) Medellín, Antioquia, Colombia
- Party: Democratic Party (since 2026)
- Other political affiliations: Conservative Party (1979–2013); Democratic Centre (2013–2025)
- Spouses: Diana Turbay (m. 1980; died 1991); Delia Jaramillo (m. 2016)
- Children: Miguel Uribe Turbay
- Education: University of Miami; University of the Andes

Miguel Uribe Londoño (Note: In this Spanish name, the first or paternal surname is Uribe and the second or maternal family name is Londoño.) (born 2 November 1952) is a Colombian politician and businessman who served as a Senator from 1990 to 1991. Uribe Londoño also served as director in Bogotá of the Party Democratic Center, and Secretary of Economy for the Presidency. Born in Medellín, Antioquia, he studied economics at the University of Miami.

== Personal life ==
Miguel Uribe Londoño was born in Medellín, Antioquia, on 2 November 1945. His father was Rodrigo Uribe Echavarría (1918–2001), who served in the Senate and as governor of Antioquia.

== Wives ==
Uribe was married to journalist Diana Turbay (1950–1991), the daughter of Julio César Turbay Ayala (1916–2005), president of Colombia from 1978 to 1982. Miguel Uribe Turbay was born to the couple in 1986.

His second wife is Delia Jaramillo Hoyos, whom he met five years after Diana Turbay's death and married some 20 years later.

== Political career ==
Uribe Londoño was a Senator for the Colombian Conservative Party in the early 1990s. After the assassination of his son, Miguel Uribe Turbay, who was campaigning for the Democratic Centre's nomination for the 2026 presidential election, Uribe Londoño launched his own presidential campaign for the same candidacy in August 2025, saying that he intended to continue his son's legacy. However, he had a falling out with the Democratic Centre's leadership and left the party. He relaunched his presidential campaign on 10 February 2026, this time as the candidate for the Democratic Colombia Party.
