= Claudia Turbay Quintero =

Colombian journalist and diplomat (born 1952)

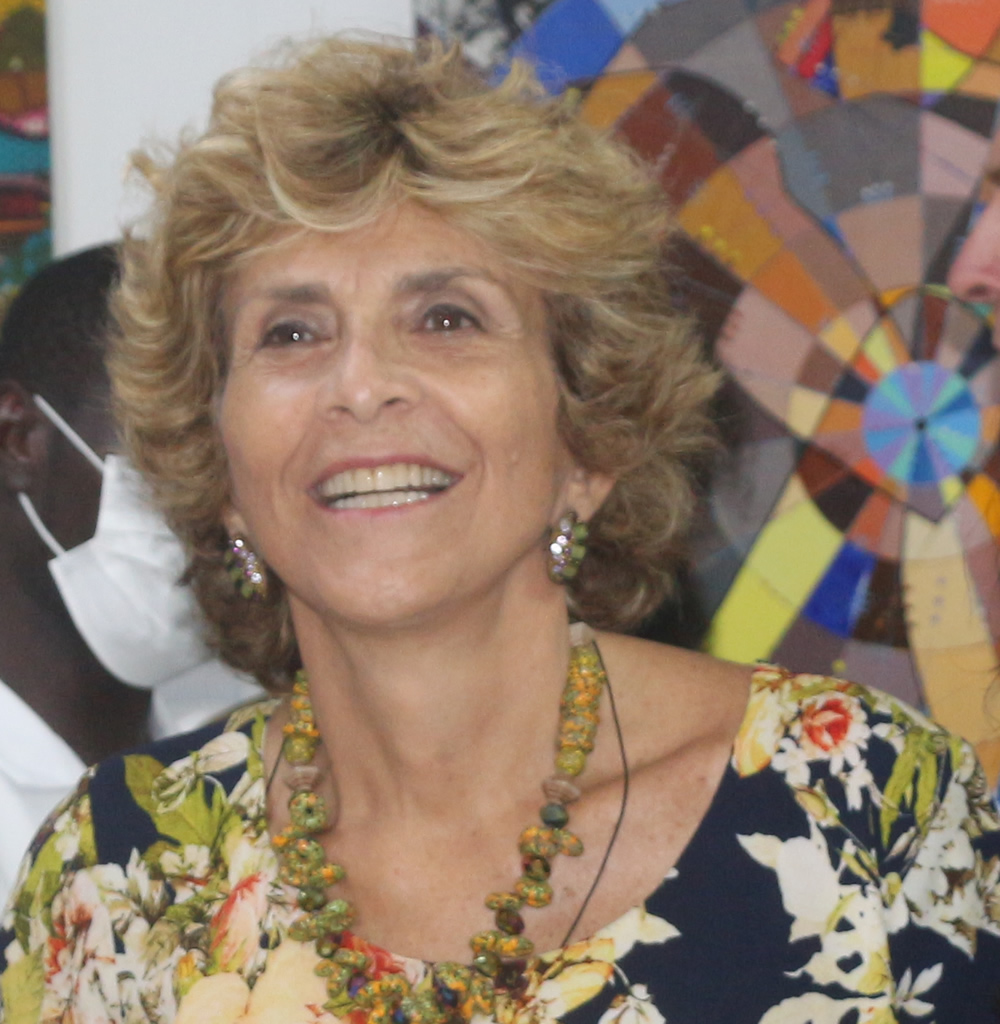
- Turbay in 2021

Colombia Ambassador to Switzerland
- In office 12 January 2010 – 26 March 2013
- President: Álvaro Uribe Vélez
- Preceded by: Claudia Jiménez Jaramillo
- Succeeded by: Beatriz Londoño Soto

Colombia Ambassador to Uruguay
- In office 8 November 2002 – 12 January 2010
- President: Álvaro Uribe Vélez
- Preceded by: Arturo Sarabia Better
- Succeeded by: María Clara Isaza Merchán

Permanent Representative of Colombia to the Latin American Integration Association
- In office 13 November 2002 – 25 November 2009
- President: Álvaro Uribe Vélez
- Preceded by: Arturo Sarabia Better
- Succeeded by: María Clara Isaza Merchán

President of Proexport
- In office 18 February 2002 – 8 August 2002
- President: Andres Pastrana Arango
- Preceded by: Angela María Orozco Gómez
- Succeeded by: Luis Guillermo Plata Páez

Personal details
- Born: 27 June 1952 (age 74) Bogotá, D.C., Colombia
- Party: Liberal
- Spouse: Jaime Granja Leudo (divorced)
- Children: 3
- Parent(s): Julio César Turbay Ayala; Nydia Quintero Turbay
- Relatives: Diana Turbay Quintero (sister); Julio César Turbay Quintero (brother)
- Education: Fordham University (BA, 1980); New York University (MA, 1984)
- Profession: Journalist

Claudia Turbay Quintero (born 27 June 1952) is a Colombian journalist and diplomat. She has served as Ambassador of Colombia to Switzerland, with dual accreditation as Non-Resident Ambassador to Liechtenstein, Ambassador of Colombia to Uruguay with dual accreditation as Permanent Representative of Colombia to the Latin American Integration Association in Montevideo, and had over 27 years of experience working with Proexport, holding various positions including Commercial Director in the Miami offices, and Vice President, eventually being appointed President of the agency in 2002.

== Career ==
She is a journalist from Fordham University with a Master of Latin American and Caribbean Studies from New York University.

=== Proexport ===
Turbay started working with Proexport, then called Proexpo, in 1974 in the New York City offices as a clerk in the business library; from there she became an adjunct member in New York City and was later appointed Commercial Director of the Miami office. She returned to Colombia in 1994 and worked for Proexport Advisor to the General Manager, Deputy General Manager, Vice President and eventually President of Proexport in 2002.

=== Ambassadorship 2002-2008 ===
On 24 October 2002, Turbay was sworn in as Ambassador Extraordinary and Plenipotentiary of the Republic of Colombia to the Oriental Republic of Uruguay with dual accreditation as Permanent Representative to the Latin American Integration Association (ALADI) by President Álvaro Uribe Vélez in a ceremony that took place in the Palace of Nariño. She presented her credentials the following month to President of Uruguay Jorge Batlle Ibáñez at the Estévez Palace on 8 November, and to ALADI Secretary General Juan Francisco Rojas Penso on 24 November.

=== Ambassadorship 2010-present ===
Following the refused acceptance of two previous candidates, President Juan Manuel Santos Calderón submitted the candidacy of Turbay to the Swiss Government for their approval and after receiving the bene placito, Turbay was sworn in on 8 January 2009 by Chancellor Jaime Bermúdez Merizalde as Ambassador Extraordinary and Plenipotentiary of the Republic of Colombia to the Swiss Confederation with dual accreditation to the Principality of Liechtenstein in a ceremony that took place at the Palace of San Carlos. After arriving at her mission in Bern, Turbay presented her credentials to Swiss President Doris Leuthard in a ceremony at the Federal Palace of Switzerland on 2 January 2010, and later that year to Crown Prince Alois of Liechtenstein in ceremony at Vaduz Castle on 17 June. Ambassador of Colombia to Ghana and West Africa from August 2013 to present time.

== Personal life ==
Born on 27 June 1952, she is the daughter of former President of Colombia Julio César Turbay Ayala and his first wife and former First Lady of Colombia Nydia Quintero Turbay. She is of Lebanese and Basque descent through both her parents. The third out of four children, her other siblings are Julio César, a politician and former Comptroller General of Colombia, Diana Consuelo, a journalist who was killed during a rescue operation following her kidnapping, and María Victoria, a lawyer and vice president of Fundación Solidaridad por Colombia a nonprofit organization in Bogotá. She married Jaime Granja Leudo with whom she had one daughter, Claudia Alexandra, but later divorced. From her second marriage, she had two children, Laura and Santiago.
