= Wall Luxury Essentials =

- Company type: Private Ltd
- Industry: Clothing retailer
- Founded: 1997
- Defunct: 2017(Trading); 2019(Ceased Operations)
- Fate: Liquidation
- Headquarters: London, UK
- Products: Women's clothing and accessories

Wall Luxury Essentials Ltd was a retailer of women's clothing and accessories. The company began as a shop in London's Notting Hill, before expanding into mail order in 1999, and e-commerce in 2000. Wall ceased trading in 2017.

== History ==
The company was founded in 1997 by Hernán and Judith de Balcázar when they opened a boutique in Notting Hill. In 1999, a mail order service was launched and a website the following year. The company was notable for generating an estimated $94.9K in revenue per employee and had an estimated annual revenue of $7.8M. It had approximately 82 employees. The company ceased to trade in 2017. The company continued to exist until it was liquidated and ceased to exist as a company in 2019.

== Community work ==
Throughout its history the company supported small businesses and charities in Peru by offering internships and by raising funds.

In March 2011, the company was mentioned during a debate on ethical fashion at the House of Lords. Baroness Rendell of Babergh stated that Wall "set an example that could be a standard for [fashion] companies".
