= Julio César Turbay Quintero =

Colombian lawyer and politician

33rd Controller General of Colombia
- In office 3 August 2006 – 30 August 2010
- President: Álvaro Uribe Vélez
- Preceded by: Antonio Hernández Gamarra
- Succeeded by: Sandra Morelli Rico

Senator of Colombia
- In office 20 July 1992 – 20 July 1998

Personal details
- Born: 1949 (age 76–77) Bogotá, D.C., Colombia
- Party: Liberal
- Spouse: Marianela Manrique C
- Parent(s): Julio César Turbay Ayala; Nydia Quintero Turbay
- Relatives: Diana Consuelo Turbay Quintero (sister); Claudia Turbay Quintero (sister)
- Education: Colegio San Carlos
- Alma mater: Pontifical Xavierian University (LLB); New York University (MPS)University of Miami (MPA)
- Profession: Lawyer

Julio César Turbay Quintero (born 1949) is a Colombian lawyer and politician. A Liberal party politician, he served as the 33rd Comptroller General of Colombia, Senator and Chamber Representative, as well as Deputy to the Cundinamarca Departmental Assembly, and Councilmember to various Municipal Councils in Cundinamarca including the Bogotá City Council.

On September 17, 2009, the magazine Cambio revealed how the comptroller spent millions of pesos from the public budget on trips that he advertised as technicals, but which were more of a private nature. Likewise, a notable increase was discovered in the contracting of services, telephone expenses, vehicles and parties in the Comptroller's Office during his period. This case is currently being investigated by the General Auditor of the Republic.

On the other hand, his successor in the Comptroller's Office, Sandra Morelli Rico, ordered the reopening of the processes that his predecessor had controversially closed: the Agro Ingreso Seguro corruption case and the investigation of Grupo Nule for the delays in the construction of Calle 26 in Bogotá.

By January 2011, the Prosecutor's Office, the Attorney General's Office and the Comptroller's Office had 10 investigations against him. The Comptroller's Office carried out disciplinary investigations but, due to having jurisdiction, it is up to the Prosecutor's Office to investigate him for embezzlement due to appropriation and irregularities in hiring as a result of an alleged parallel payroll that would reach 18 billion pesos and that Morelli denounced.

For its part, the Attorney General's Office is conducting four other disciplinary investigations, still in the preliminary stage, for excessive spending during her tenure. The Comptroller's Office also asked the Prosecutor's Office to investigate him for his alleged responsibility in the embezzlement of health. To that point, Turbay had already given questioning to the Prosecutor's Office.

== Personal life ==
Julio César Turbay is the son of former President of Colombia Julio César Turbay Ayala and his first wife and former First Lady of Colombia Nydia Quintero Turbay. He is of Lebanese and Basque descent through both his parents. The eldest out of four children, his other siblings are Diana Consuelo, a journalist who was killed during a rescue operation following her kidnapping, Claudia, current Ambassador of Colombia to Switzerland, and María Victoria, a lawyer and vice president of Fundación Solidaridad por Colombia, a nonprofit organization in Bogotá. He is married to Marianela Manrique.
