= Miguel Uribe (footballer) =

Colombian footballer (born 1995)

Personal information
- Date of birth: 1 January 1995 (age 31)
- Place of birth: Bogotá, Colombia
- Height: 1.84 m (6 ft 0 in)
- Position: Goalkeeper

College career
Years	Team	Apps	(Gls)
2015	Graceland Yellowjackets	8	(0)
2016–2018	Southern Wesleyan Warriors	55	(0)

Senior career*
Years	Team	Apps	(Gls)
2019	Greenville Triumph	1	(0)
- * Club domestic league appearances and goals as of 3 October 2019

Miguel Uribe (born 1 January 1995) is a Colombian footballer who plays as a goalkeeper.

== Career ==
=== College ===
Uribe began playing college soccer at Graceland University in 2015, before transferring to Southern Wesleyan University in 2016, where he stayed for three seasons.

=== Professional ===
On 28 February 2019, Uribe signed for USL League One side Greenville Triumph SC ahead of their inaugural season.
