= Gustavo Balcázar Monzón =

Colombian lawyer and retired politician

Senator of Colombia
- In office 20 July 1982 – 20 July 1994
- In office 20 July 1966 – 18 January 1979
- In office 20 July 1962 – 8 September 1962

15th Colombia Ambassador to the United Kingdom
- In office 18 January 1979 – 21 September 1981
- President: Julio César Turbay Ayala
- Preceded by: Jaime García Parra
- Succeeded by: Diego Andrés Restrepo Londoño

16th Colombian Minister of Agriculture
- In office 6 October 1964 – 1 September 1965
- President: Guillermo León Valencia
- Preceded by: Virgilio Barco Vargas
- Succeeded by: José Mejía Salazar

48th Governor of Valle del Cauca
- In office 8 September 1962 – 17 October 1964
- President: Guillermo León Valencia
- Preceded by: Carlos Humberto Morales
- Succeeded by: Humberto González Narváez

Member of the Chamber of Representatives of Colombia
- In office 20 July 1958 – 20 July 1962
- Constituency: Valle del Cauca Department

Personal details
- Born: Gustavo Balcázar Monzón; 10 August 1927 (age 99) Cali, Cauca Valley, Colombia
- Party: Liberal
- Spouse(s): Bolivia Ramos (divorced); Nydia Quintero (1984–2025; her death)
- Children: María Isabel Balcázar Ramos; Iliana Balcázar Ramos
- Education: Pontifical Xavierian University (LLB, LLM, LLD)
- Profession: Lawyer

Gustavo Balcázar Monzón (born 10 August 1927) is a Colombian lawyer and retired politician. A member of the Colombian Liberal Party, he served as Member of both the Senate and the Chamber of Representatives of Colombia, presiding over both chambers of Congress. He also served in the administrations of President Guillermo León Valencia as the 48th Governor of Valle del Cauca, and as the 16th Minister of Agriculture, and in the administration of President Julio César Turbay Ayala as the 18th Ambassador of Colombia to the United Kingdom, and Non-Resident Ambassador to Algeria.

== Personal life ==
He was born on 10 August 1927 in Santiago de Cali, to Ricardo Balcázar and Leonor Monzón and married Bolivia Ramos, with whom he had two daughters, María Isabel and Iliana. Already divorced, he remarried to Nydia Quintero, former First Lady of Colombia, in a civil ceremony in 1984.

He received his primary and secondary education at Berchmans School in Cali. He later traveled to Bogotá to pursue his university studies in Law and Economics at the Pontificia Universidad Javeriana, obtaining his degree in 1950 with the thesis The city, urban planning and the valorization tax.
