= Nydia Quintero =

First Lady of Colombia from 1978 to 1982

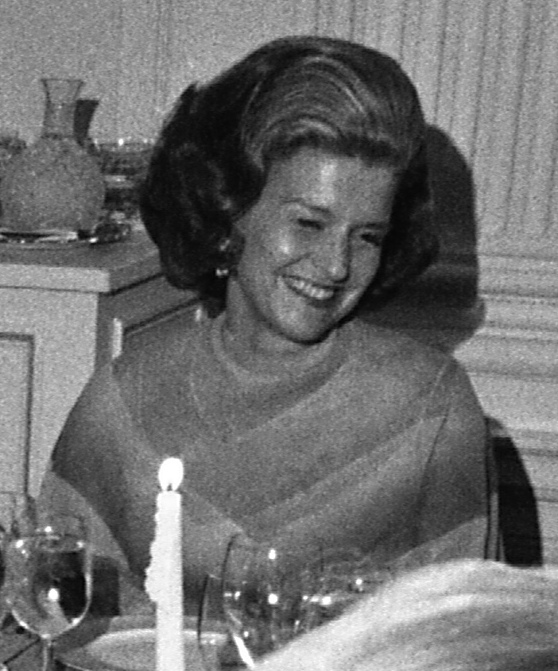
- Quintero in 1975

First Lady of Colombia
- In role 7 August 1978 – 7 August 1982
- President: Julio César Turbay Ayala
- Preceded by: Cecilia Caballero Blanco
- Succeeded by: Rosa Álvarez de Betancur

Personal details
- Born: Nydia Quintero Turbay; 28 August 1932 Neiva, Huila, Colombia
- Died: 30 June 2025 (aged 92) Bogota, D.C., Colombia
- Party: Liberal
- Spouses: Julio César Turbay Ayala (m. 1948; ann. 1983); Gustavo Balcázar (m. 1984)
- Children: Julio César; Diana; Claudia; María Victoria

Nydia Quintero Turbay de Balcázar (née Quintero Turbay; (Note: Quintero was named Nydia Quintero Turbay at birth. Later, after her marriage, she adopted her husband's surname according to Spanish naming customs, resulting in Nydia Quintero de Turbay. In 1984 she adopted her second husband's surname, resulting in Nydia Quintero Turbay de Balcazar.) 28 August 1932 – 30 June 2025) was a Colombian activist and humanitarian who served as the first lady of Colombia from 1978 to 1982, as the wife of President Julio César Turbay Ayala. Throughout her decades of public service, she was a prominent advocate for children's rights, disaster relief, and charity.

Quintero was born in Neiva, Huila, and graduated from the Antonia Santos National School. She only saw her future husband twice before they were married in 1948. Quintero supported her husband during his political campaign for the Senate in 1970. She campaigned very discreetly for him during his candidacy for the presidency of Colombia in the 1978 election, in which he defeated the Conservative candidate Belisario Betancur.

Quintero was actively involved in politics during her husband's presidency. During his term, Quintero emphasized the importance of social assistance through commitment and service.

== Early life, marriage and family ==
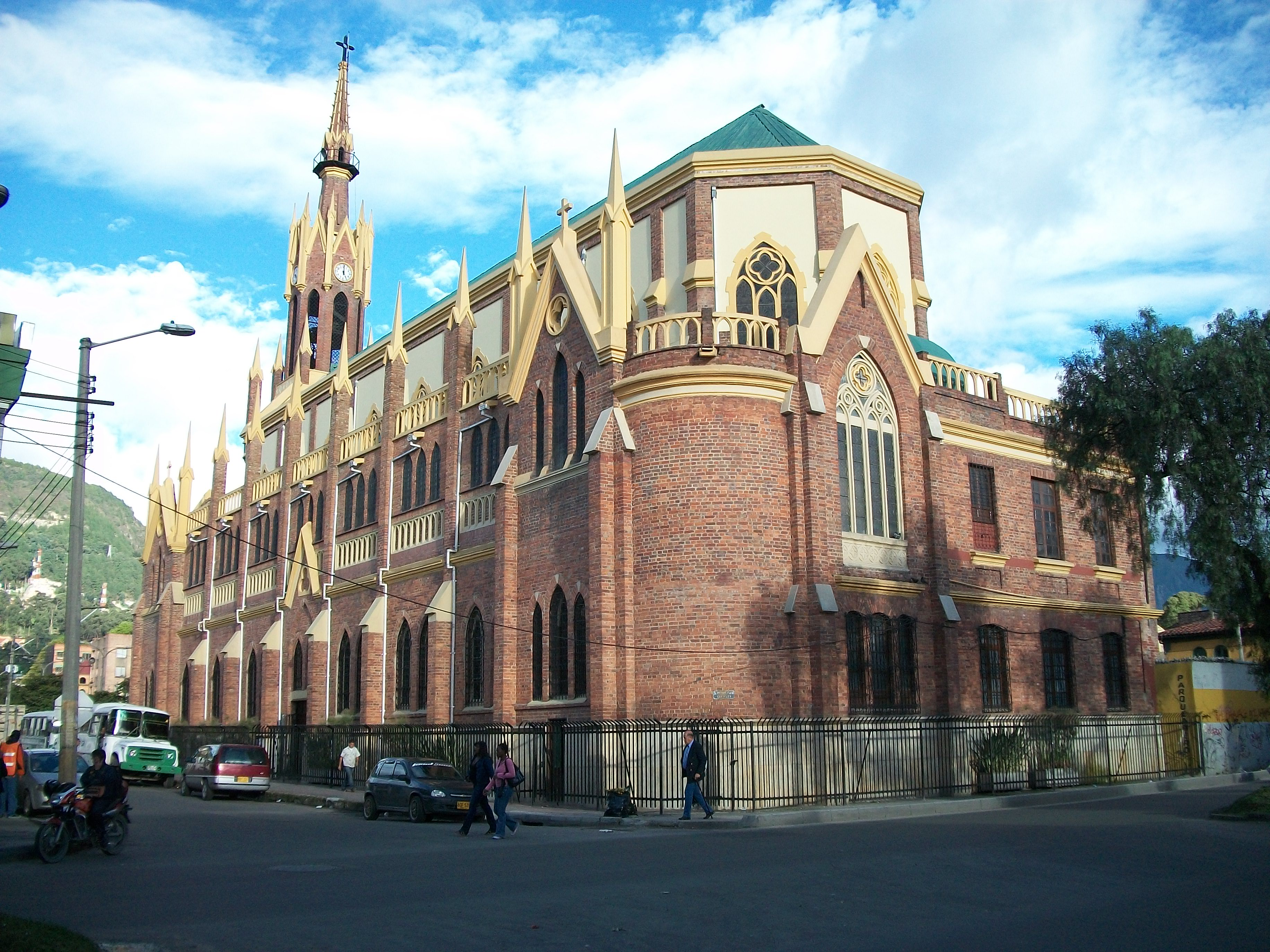
Church of Santa Teresita in the Santa Teresita neighborhood of Bogotá

Nydia Quintero Turbay was born on 22 October 1931, in Neiva, Huila to Jorge Quintero and Adhalía Turbay de Quintero (née Turbay Ayala). Her mother was a descendant of Lebanese migrants and her father was a descendant of Basque migrants. After the death of her father she moved to Bogotá where she studied at the Antonia Santos National High School.

Quintero married her uncle Turbay in the Church of Santa Teresita in Bogotá on 1 July 1948, when she was 16 years old. Quintero would witness the events of 9 April 1948 that began the Bogotazo, she would describe how she witnessed the events while she was dancing ballet. A year later, in February 1949, his eldest son Julio César would be born. In 1962 she would support her husband in his campaign for Senator.

In 1975, Turbay would be appointed as Minister of Foreign Affairs by President Alfonso López Michelsen, so Quintero accompanied her husband on multiple visits and high-level meetings throughout the country observing the needs of many Colombians. In 1975, Quintero founded the Solidarity for Colombia Foundation as a non-profit foundation. In 1978, he joined the foundation in the 1978 presidential campaign. After Turbay's election as president, Quintero would play the role of social hostess at the Casa de Nariño, a role she used alongside the foundation by donating assistance during natural disasters while presiding as chairwomen of the Colombian Institute of Family Welfare. Quintero came to enjoy the role by allowing him to work for children. Years later, she would describe that it was an honour for her to work for Colombia and contribute to society.

=== Divorce and later life ===
In 1983, after several months of speculation, Turbay publicly announced their separation. The relationship had grown strained during the last two years of Julio César's term, and in mid-1983, they both filed for an annulment, officially ending their 35-year marriage. A year later, Quintero married Gustavo Balcázar in a private ceremony in Bogotá in mid-1984.

In 2016, after 41 years of work and service at the head of the Solidarity for Colombia Foundation, Quintero decided to hand over the position to her granddaughter María Carolina. Who went on to become president of the foundation since then. After her retirement in 2016, Quintero's public appearances became shorter and were gradually reduced. In her last years, she lost her voice, which totally isolated her from public life. On 30 June 2025, she died at the Fundación Santa Fe clinic. She remained hospitalized for two days starting on 28 June, after a mild respiratory infection. After her death, Quintero was exhibited in the Heliptic Hall of the National Capitol. Her coffin was decorated with the flag of the Solidarity for Colombia Foundation. She was buried in the Central Cemetery of Bogotá, the ceremony included a prayer and blessing under the Maronite rite by Monsignor Fadi Abou Chebel, Apostolic Exarch of Bogotá and leader of the Mariamite Maronite Order. The ceremony honoured the Lebanese origins of the Turbay family.

== Honours ==
- Spain: Dame Grand Cross of the Royal Order of Isabella the Catholic

== Notes ==
Honorary titles
Preceded by Cecilia Caballero Blanco	First Lady of Colombia; 1978–1982	Succeeded by Rosa Álvarez de Betancur
