= Modelia, Bogotá =

Modelia
- Barrio
- Interactive map of Modelia
- Country: Colombia
- Department: Distrito Capital
- City: Bogotá
- Locality: Fontibón

Modelia is a neighborhood (barrio) of Bogotá, Colombia, located in Fontibón locality.
