= Fontibón =

- Locality of Bogotá
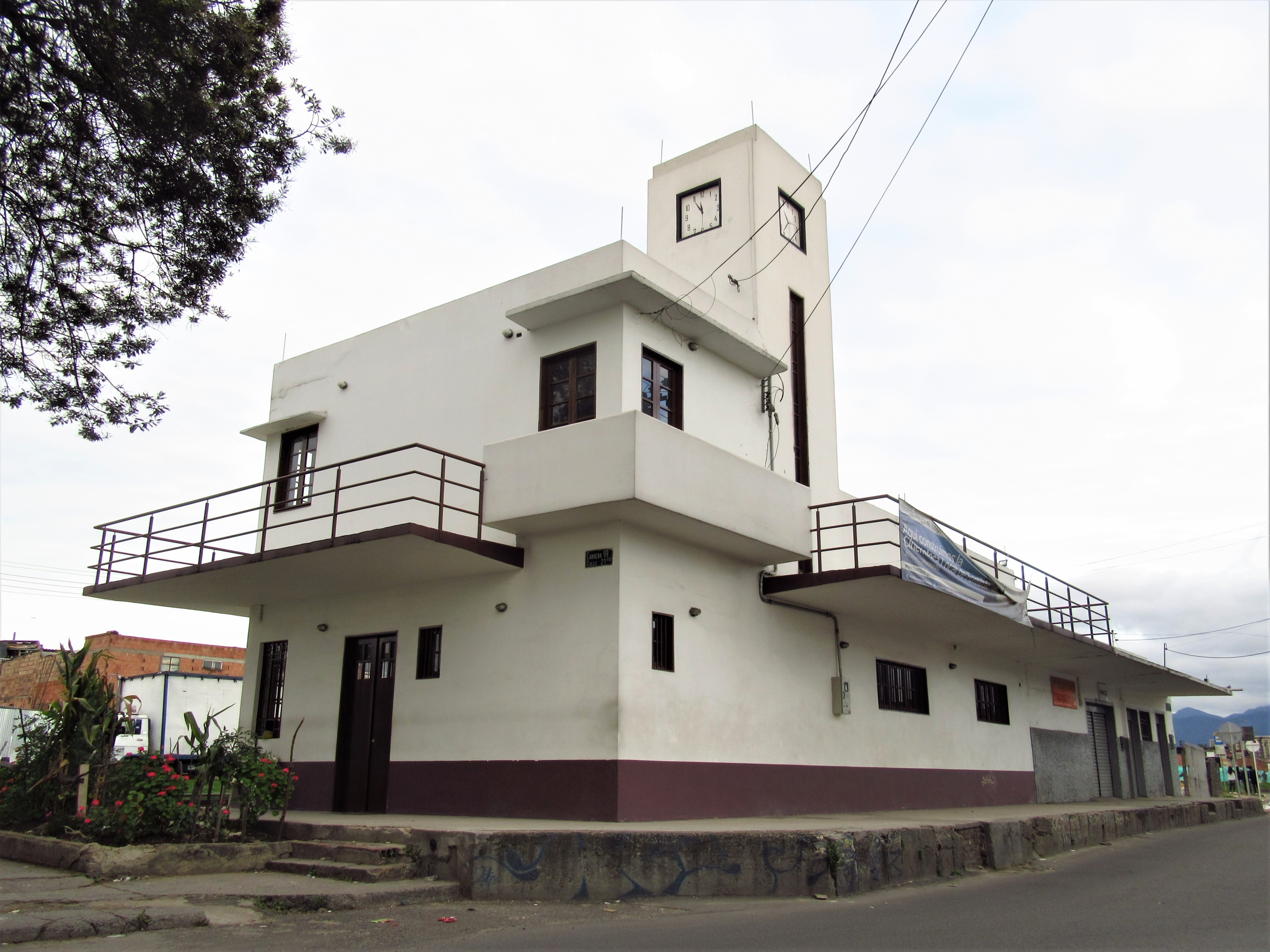
- Fontibon Train Station

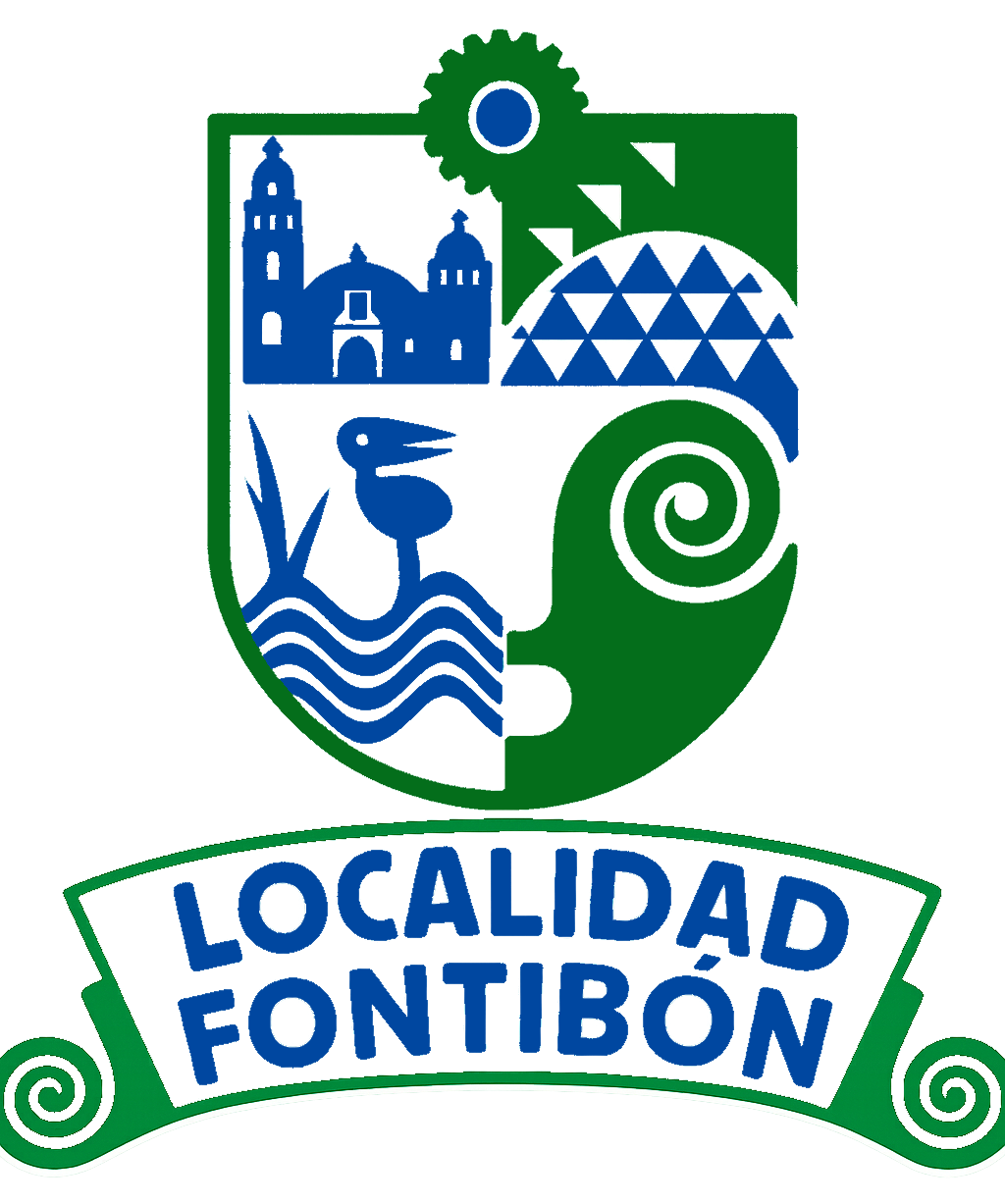
- Coat of arms

- Location of the locality in the city of Bogotá

- Location of the locality in the Capital District of Bogotá
- Coordinates: 4°40′43″N 74°08′28″W
- Country: Colombia
- City: Bogotá D.C.
- Neighbourhoods: List: Ciudad Salitre; Modelia

Area
  - Total: 33.28 km^{2} (12.85 sq mi)
- Elevation: 2,600 m (8,500 ft)

Population (2007)
  - Total: 317,179
  - Density: 9,531/km^{2} (24,680/sq mi)
- Time zone: UTC-5 (Colombia Standard Time)
- Website: Official website

Fontibon is the 9th locality of Bogotá. It is located in the west of the city. This district is mostly inhabited by low and middle class residents. El Dorado International Airport is located in this district.

== Etymology ==
The origin of the city's name can be traced to the Muisca cacique Huintiva or Hyntiba (meaning "powerful cacique" in Muysccubun) and the mutation of the word to its present spelling, this among other names such as Ontibon and Hontibón.

== History ==
Fontibón was part of the southern Muisca Confederation in the times before the Spanish conquest. It was incorporated into the newly formed capital district of Bogotá on December 17, 1954. Fontibon was the gate to the current city of Bogotá founded as Santa Fe de Bogotá, for conquistador Gonzalo Jimenez de Quesada and his fellow expeditioners.

The city was cradle to the residence of Peter Claver. Little by little the community became one of the most idolizing and religious. The city started to expand, and in the sixteenth century it was divided into 22 "capitanias". Fontibon's original maps constitute one of Colombia's oldest documents. In 1956, Fontibon was merged with Bogotá, losing its status as an "associate town".

== Economy ==
The neighborhood has the headquarters of SATENA.

== Monuments ==
- Fontibón Cathedral
- San Antonio Bridge

== Climate ==
Climate data for El Dorado International Airport, Elevation: 2547m (1972-1990)
Month	Jan	Feb	Mar	Apr	May	Jun	Jul	Aug	Sep	Oct	Nov	Dec	Year
Mean daily maximum °C (°F)	19.6 (67.3)	19.7 (67.5)	19.7 (67.5)	19.3 (66.7)	19.0 (66.2)	18.3 (64.9)	18.1 (64.6)	18.3 (64.9)	18.7 (65.7)	18.8 (65.8)	19.1 (66.4)	19.2 (66.6)	19.0 (66.2)
Daily mean °C (°F)	12.9 (55.2)	13.2 (55.8)	13.6 (56.5)	13.8 (56.8)	13.8 (56.8)	13.5 (56.3)	13.1 (55.6)	13.1 (55.6)	13.1 (55.6)	13.2 (55.8)	13.4 (56.1)	12.9 (55.2)	13.3 (55.9)
Mean daily minimum °C (°F)	5.4 (41.7)	6.1 (43.0)	7.4 (45.3)	8.2 (46.8)	8.4 (47.1)	8.0 (46.4)	7.5 (45.5)	7.0 (44.6)	6.9 (44.4)	7.6 (45.7)	7.7 (45.9)	6.1 (43.0)	7.2 (44.9)
Average precipitation mm (inches)	33 (1.3)	43 (1.7)	66 (2.6)	111 (4.4)	94 (3.7)	57 (2.2)	41 (1.6)	49 (1.9)	73 (2.9)	115 (4.5)	88 (3.5)	54 (2.1)	824 (32.4)
Average precipitation days (≥ 0.1 mm)	8	11	14	18	20	19	17	16	17	20	18	12	190
Average dew point °C (°F)	8.8 (47.8)	9.3 (48.7)	10.1 (50.2)	10.7 (51.3)	10.6 (51.1)	9.9 (49.8)	9.1 (48.4)	9.0 (48.2)	9.4 (48.9)	10.0 (50.0)	10.0 (50.0)	9.0 (48.2)	9.7 (49.4)
Mean monthly sunshine hours	190.4	150.3	145.9	110.5	115.8	111.1	142.4	138.5	123.3	119.8	133.7	166.4	1,648.1
Source: NOAA NCEI(temperatures 1971-1990)

== Transportation ==
The city is still far away from Bogota's major mass transport system, the TransMilenio. Fontibon's main highway leads to Medellín.
