= Julio César Turbay Ayala =

President of Colombia from 1978 to 1982

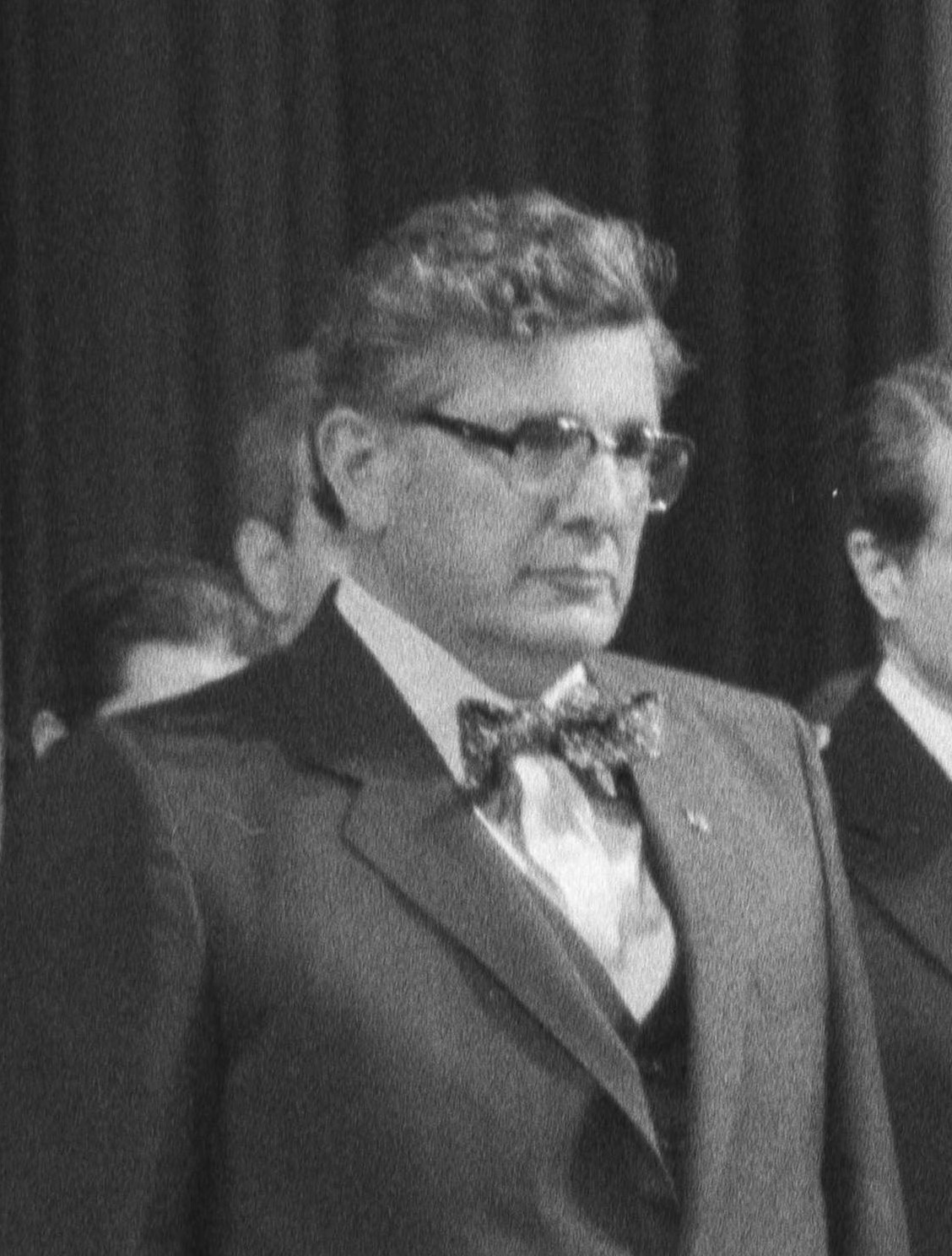
- Turbay during a visit to the Hôtel de Ville, Paris, 1979

26th President of Colombia
- In office 7 August 1978 – 7 August 1982
- Preceded by: Alfonso López Michelsen
- Succeeded by: Belisario Betancur

Presidential Designate
- In office 4 September 1974 – 6 October 1976
- President: Alfonso López Michelsen
- Preceded by: Rafael Azuero Manchola
- Succeeded by: Indalecio Liévano
- In office 27 September 1967 – 6 December 1972
- President: Carlos Lleras Restrepo (1967–1970); Misael Pastrana Borrero (1970–1972)
- Preceded by: José Antonio Montalvo
- Succeeded by: Rafael Azuero Manchola

Colombian Ambassador to Italy
- In office 1991–1993
- President: César Gaviria
- Preceded by: Oscar Mejía Vallejo
- Succeeded by: Plinio Apuleyo Mendoza

Colombian Ambassador to the Holy See
- In office 1987–1989
- President: Virgilio Barco Vargas
- Succeeded by: Fernando Hinestrosa Forero

Colombian Ambassador to the United States
- In office 29 April 1975 – 1976
- President: Alfonso López Michelsen
- Preceded by: Douglas Botero Boshel
- Succeeded by: Virgilio Barco Vargas

Colombian Ambassador to the United Kingdom
- In office 6 January 1973 – 15 January 1975
- President: Misael Pastrana Borrero
- Preceded by: Camilo de Brigard Silva
- Succeeded by: Alfredo Vásquez Carrizosa

Permanent Representative of Colombia to the United Nations
- In office 1967–1969
- President: Carlos Lleras Restrepo
- Preceded by: Alfonso Patiño Rosselli
- Succeeded by: Joaquín Vallejo Arbeláez

Minister of Mines and Petroleum
- In office 11 May 1957 – 7 August 1958
- President: Gabriel París Gordillo
- Preceded by: Francisco Puyana
- Succeeded by: Jorge Ospina Delgado

Minister of Foreign Affairs
- In office 7 August 1958 – 1 September 1961
- President: Alberto Lleras Camargo
- Preceded by: Carlos Sanz de Santamaría
- Succeeded by: José Joaquín Caicedo Castilla

Personal details
- Born: Julio César Turbay Ayala; 18 June 1916 Bogotá, D.C., Colombia
- Died: 13 September 2005 (aged 89) Bogotá, D.C., Colombia
- Party: Liberal
- Spouses: Nydia Quintero (m. 1948; ann. 1983) Amparo Canal Sandoval (m. 1986)
- Children: Julio César; Diana; Claudia; María Victoria
- Occupation: Lawyer

Julio César Turbay Ayala (18 June 1916 – 13 September 2005) was a Colombian lawyer and politician who served as the 26th president of Colombia from 1978 to 1982. He also held the positions of Foreign Minister and Ambassador to the United States.

== Early life ==
Turbay was born in the wealthy neighborhood of "Voto Nacional", Bogotá, on June 18, 1916. His father, Antonio Amín Turbay, was a businessman who emigrated from Tannourine, Lebanon. His mother, Rosaura Ayala, was a peasant from the province of Cundinamarca. Turbay's father, a hard-working merchant, built up a fortune, which he completely lost during the Thousand Days War. Turbay Ayala completed his secondary studies in Bogotá, but never attended college, and instead became an autodidact, a fact that his political adversaries always poked fun at. He received a number of honorary degrees later in life.

== Political career ==
Turbay started his political career in the Liberal Party as a councilman in the (then) town of Usme in 1936. He would later be appointed as mayor of the city of Girardot (1937), and then councilman in the town of Engativá in 1938 along with fellow politicians Alfonso López Michelsen and Álvaro Gómez Hurtado. The next few years he spent as a member of the Assembly of Cundinamarca. In 1943 he was chosen for congress as a Chamber Representative. He was a leader of the opposition to conservative governments, and in 1953 became a member of the national directive of the liberal party. With the rise to power of the military Junta that ousted dictator Gustavo Rojas Pinilla, Turbay was appointed Minister of Mines and Petroleum. He was later appointed Minister of Foreign Affairs by president Alberto Lleras Camargo until 1961. He was known as a strong defender of the National Front, and was chosen as senator for four consecutive periods between 1962 and 1974. He also served briefly as interim president in 1967. He was also appointed as ambassador to the UN (1967–1969), the United Kingdom (1973–1974), and the United States (1975–1976). He first attempted to become a presidential candidate in 1974, but ended up supporting López Michelsen, who won the elections that year. The sector supporting López Michelsen was instrumental in Turbay's presidential campaign of 1978, and after a very narrow election he became president of Colombia in 1978.

== Presidency ==
=== 1978 Security Statute ===
In response to an increase in guerrilla activity from the 19th of April Movement (M-19) and the Revolutionary Armed Forces of Colombia, as well as to the Colombian Communist Party's attempts to extend its political influence and a 1977 national strike, a 1978 decree, known as the Security Statute, was implemented by Turbay's administration.

Militants, unionists, social and university leaders, as well as intellectuals were considered opposed to the policies of the “Turbayista” government and were seen as enemies of the nation and its interests. It was a time of clear abuses of authority, disappearances, torture and other types of punishment against those considered to be opponents.

The Security Statute gave the military an increased degree of freedom of action, especially in urban areas, to detain, interrogate and eventually judge suspected guerrillas or their collaborators before military tribunals. Human rights organizations, newspaper columnists, political personalities and opposition groups complained about an increase in the number of arbitrary detentions and acts of torture as a result.

Although the Security Statute allegedly benefited some of the counterinsurgency operations of the security forces, such as the capture of most of the M-19's command structure and many of the guerrilla group's urban cells, the measure became highly unpopular inside and outside Colombia, promoting some measure of public sympathy for the victims of the real or perceived military abuses whether they were guerrillas or not, and was phased out towards the end of the Turbay administration.

=== External relations ===
In terms of foreign policy, the country moved to the right, showing itself to be an ally of the United States, first with President Jimmy Carter, and then with his successor, Ronald Reagan. Turbay aligned the country with Ronald Reagan's conservative policies, which caused him problems with neighbouring American nations.

Turbay also became involved with the UK, supporting the British cause during the Falklands War, a position that isolated the country from other Latin American nations. The controversy did not stop there, as under Turbay's administration, Colombia severed diplomatic relations with Cuba.

=== 1980 Dominican embassy crisis ===
The M-19's late 1980 takeover of the Dominican Republic's embassy, during which sixteen ambassadors were held hostage for 61 days, presented a complicated challenge to the Turbay administration.

The incident soon spread throughout worldwide headlines, as ambassadors from the United States of America, Costa Rica, Mexico, Peru, Israel and Venezuela had been taken hostage, as well as Colombia's top representative to the Holy See.

Turbay, despite pressure from military and political sectors, avoided deciding to solve the crisis through the use of direct military force, and instead eventually agreed to let the M-19 rebels travel to Cuba. Allegedly, the rebels also received USD 1 million as payment, instead of the initial $50 million that they had originally demanded from the government.

That a mostly peaceful resolution to the crisis was found has been generally considered as a positive aspect of Turbay's administration, as seen by later and contemporary commentators and historians.

In particular, former M-19 members, including Rosemberg Pabón, the commander of the guerrilla group's operative unit at the time, later recognized and respected Turbay's handling of the situation.

== Post-presidency ==
Turbay was a supporter of president Álvaro Uribe. He initially opposed the possibility of presidential reelection in Colombia, but later changed his views, contributing to founding a movement known as Patria Nueva ("New Homeland"), in order to help promote Uribe's 2006 reelection aspirations.

=== Support for a prisoner exchange with the FARC ===
Turbay was seen as being at odds with some of Uribe's policies, however, in particular due to Turbay's activism in favor of the implementation and negotiation of a prisoner exchange with the FARC guerrilla group. As part of this effort, Turbay participated in several meetings with the relatives of FARC hostages and signed several declarations of support, together with other former presidents such as Alfonso López Michelsen and Ernesto Samper Pizano.

On August 31, 2005, Turbay proposed that the government could exchange each jailed guerrilla for 10 "economic" hostages (those held for extortion purposes) and one "political" hostage (those held by the FARC in order to pressure the Colombian government to release its jailed members).

== Personal life ==
Turbay married his niece, Nydia Quintero Turbay, on July 1, 1948. They had four children together: Julio César, Diana, Claudia, and María Victoria. However, their marriage was annulled by the Catholic Church. In 1986, he married his longtime companion Amparo Canal, to whom he remained married until his death. He is related to Paola Turbay.

In January 1991, Turbay's daughter, journalist Diana Turbay, was kidnapped by orders of the Medellín Cartel and died during a failed police rescue operation not sanctioned by her family. Her kidnapping is chronicled in News of a Kidnapping by the Nobel Prize-winning author Gabriel García Márquez (1996) and depicted in multiple onscreen productions.

His grandson, Miguel Uribe Turbay, was a senator.

A personal idiosyncrasy of Turbay's was his custom of wearing bow ties, a sartorial habit extremely uncommon in Colombia.

== Death ==
Turbay died on 13 September 2005, at the age of 89. He was honored by a state funeral personally led by President Álvaro Uribe and was buried at the Sacromonte Caves at Canton Norte, an army base in Bogotá. He visited Lebanon with his family in 2003 as a final trip to the homeland of his family.

== Controversy ==
In recent times, it was revealed that Turbay was the most prominent name included in Jimmy Carter’s Colombia Blacklist, which comprised corrupt politicians and officers profiting from the drug trade.

Political offices
Preceded by Francisco Puyana	Minister of Mines and Petroleum; 1957-1958	Succeeded by Jorge Ospina Delgado
Preceded by Carlos Sanz de Santamaría	Minister of Foreign Affairs; 1958-1961	Succeeded by José Joaquín Caicedo Castilla
Preceded by Hugo Escobar	President of the Senate; 1974-1975	Succeeded by Gustavo Balcázar Monzón
Preceded by Alfonso López Michelsen	President of Colombia; 1978-1982	Succeeded by Belisario Betancur
Diplomatic posts
Preceded by Alfonso Patiño Rosselli	Permanent Representative of Colombia to the United Nations; 1967-1969	Succeeded by Joaquín Vallejo Arbeláez
Preceded by Camilo de Brigard Silva	Colombian Ambassador to the United Kingdom; 1973-1975	Succeeded by Alfredo Vásquez Carrizosa
Preceded by Douglas Botero Boshel	Colombian Ambassador to the United States; 1975-1976	Succeeded by Virgilio Barco Vargas
Preceded by Oscar Mejía Vallejo	Colombian Ambassador to Italy; 1991-1993	Succeeded by Plinio Apuleyo Mendoza
